= Haast-Hollyford road =

Road in New Zealand

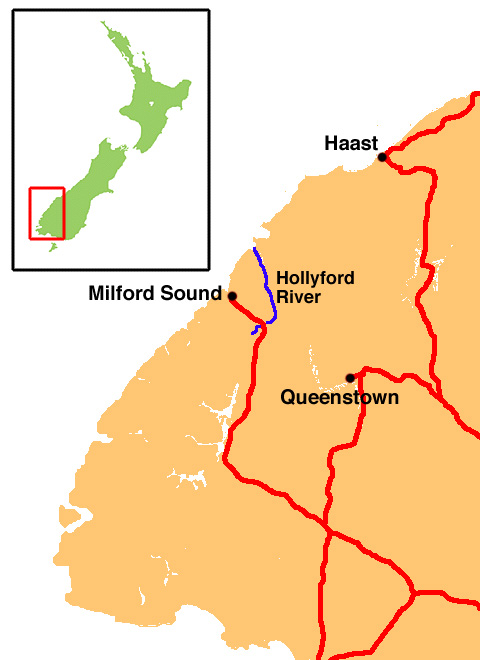
Planned routes for the road follow either the coastline or inland valleys but both end up going through the Hollyford Valley.

The Haast-Hollyford road or Haast-Hollyford Highway is a long-standing proposal to link Haast via the Hollyford Valley to Milford Sound and Te Anau in the South Island of New Zealand.

Proposals for the road have been suggested since the 1870s. The road was originally seen as the only land access to the port of Jackson Bay from the Otago goldfields, but it has never been possible to cross the Main Divide to Lake Wakatipu. A road has, however, been constructed north from Lake Te Anau to Milford Sound, which is a major tourist route, and most more recent proposals have focussed on extending this road north. The South Island Local Bodies Association regularly passed remits from the 1950s through to the 1980s in support of a road but the Ministry of Works, a government department responsible for road building during that period, repeatedly stated that such a road was not a priority for funding.

== Pros and cons of a Haast-Hollyford road ==
One of the reasons for constructing the road is to relieve tourism congestion at Milford Sound. Currently, most tourists come from Queenstown and this results in a peak of activity in the middle of the day. The final stretch of the current road from the Hollyford Valley to Milford Sound is also subject to many closures during winter, significantly reducing tourist numbers around Te Anau.

Construction of a Haast-Hollyford road would also give tourists an opportunity of seeing far more of the South Island within the same given time. A Haast-Hollyford route would significantly reduce the length of road tourists would travel if they were journeying between Fiordland and the West Coast. A purpose-built scenic drive designed to minimise environmental damage and maximise tourist enjoyment would put Haast only 175 kilometres (109 mi) from Milford Sound; the distance at present is 539 kilometres (335 mi). One proposal has the road 198 km long.

There is significant opposition to these proposals, however, as any road would have to pass through unspoilt land of significant natural beauty; the area is within Fiordland National Park, part of the Te Wahipounamu World Heritage area. Environmentalists strongly oppose construction of the road.

An estimated cost for the construction of the road is NZ$300 million, and it is widely acknowledge that the proposed road would likely be a toll road. The high cost of constructing the road is given as a reason for putting it on an indefinite hold. Furthermore, the $300 million is disputed by opposers to the road. For example, Federated Mountain Clubs has obtained cost assessments from two independent roading engineers, both of whom estimate the construction cost to be at least $1 billion.

== Geography ==
The planned routes for the proposed road pass through an area that has had very little in the way of human impact. The area is covered with beech and podocarp forest that has never been logged. There are a number of rivers and lakes along the proposed route.

One of the proposed routes would go through Fiordland National Park and Mount Aspiring National Park as well as the Awarua Point Conservation Area, and would follow the Hollyford Track (a tramping track in the Hollyford Valley).

== History of road proposals ==
=== Nineteenth century ===
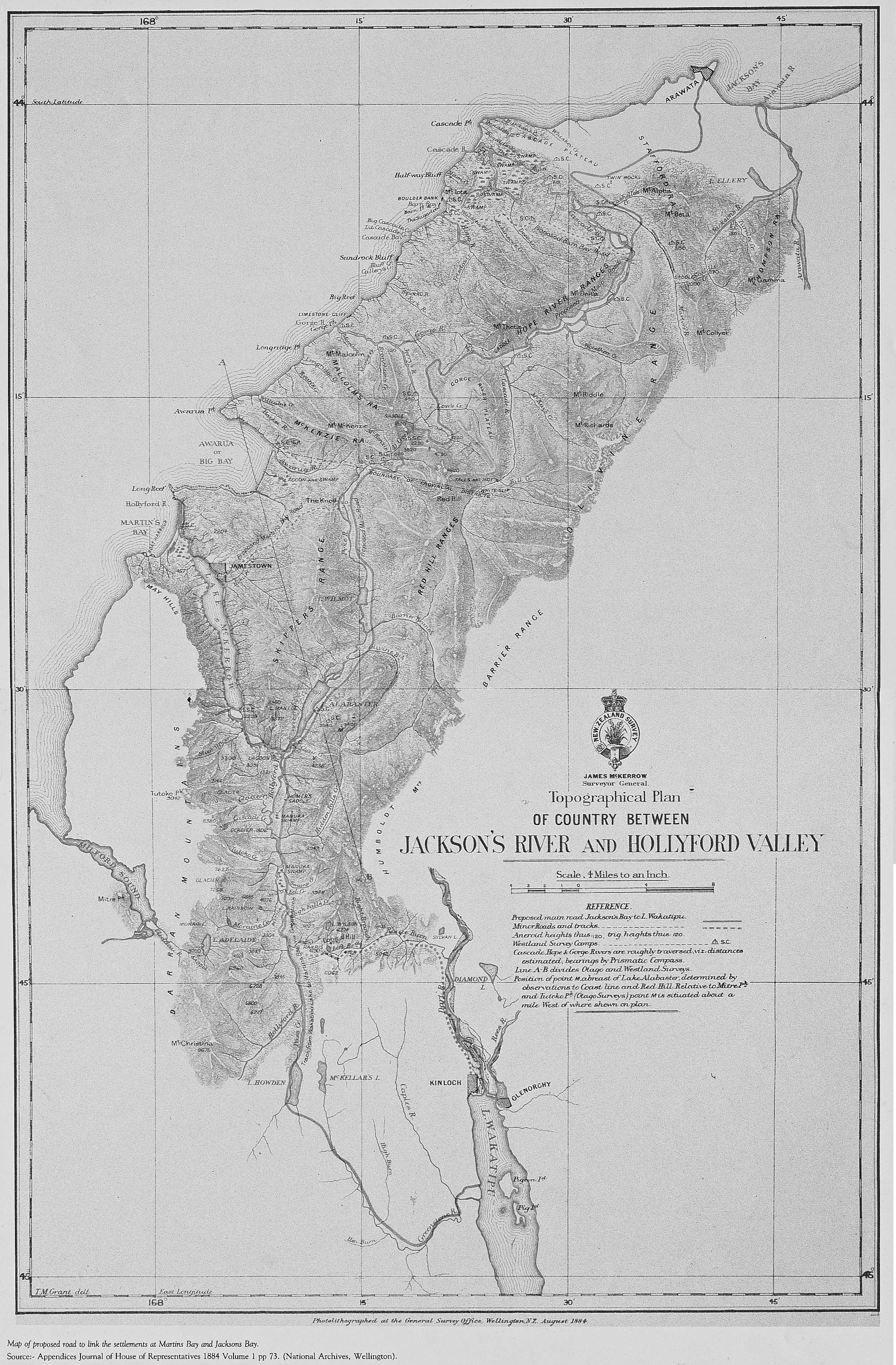
Photolithographed at the General Survey Office, Wellington NZ August 1884. Map of the proposed road to link the settlements of Martins Bay and Jacksons Bay

Otago provincial leaders identified the need for a road between Otago and South Westland's goldfields in 1865, and sent surveyor Vincent Pyke to explore. Pyke came back with an idea for a Clyde-Haast railway that was never fulfilled but provided some basis for a road to Wānaka, which opened 100 years later. A Haast-Hollyford road was considered key to further Westland development.

The road's history forms a not-so-small chapter in the story of West Coast settlement in the 1870s, promoted by then Prime Minister Sir Julius Vogel. In 1876 Duncan Macfarlane, the Government agent at Jackson Bay, and Gerhard Mueller, Westland's chief surveyor, focused on the alpine route in 1876 and 1884 respectively. Some construction occurred at the northern end in 1885, and again in 1891.

Mueller and James McKerrow drew up a topographical plan of the area between the Jackson and Hollyford Rivers in 1884, showing the proposed route between Lake Wakatipu and Jacksons Bay. This was published in the appendices to the journal of the House of Representatives 1884 Volume 1 Page 73, now held at National Archives. Two years later, Mueller proposed a road from the Cascade Plateau to the junction of the Pyke and Hollyford Rivers. A full survey and plan of the 47-mile stretch was completed about this time. By 1898 there was a metalled horse-track between the Cascade and Barn Bay.

=== 1901–1945 ===
Little was done on the planned road until the Great Depression, when it was seen as a possible unemployment relief work scheme. By April 1931 about 200 men were employed on the Milford Road, and over the course of 18 months, 33 miles (53 km) of road were completed. In April 1934, a preliminary survey of the mountain country through which the Milford Road would pass was completed. By June, an announcement that the Government had decided to complete the Eglinton Valley Road through to Milford Sound was made. The road had by now reached Marian Corner, where the route meets the valley of the Hollyford River. The crossing of the main divide between the Hollyford River and Milford Sound basin was the most difficult and costly part of the undertaking, and necessitated the driving of a long tunnel. It was generally considered that the Gertrude Saddle was the most favourable point at which to cross the divide, but the tunnelling required on this route was found to be nearly 107 chains (7,100 ft; 2,200 m) in length, whereas it was possible to pass under the Homer Saddle with one tunnel of 60 chains (4,000 ft; 1,200 m) in length.

J.H. Christie and T. Evans, the Town Clerk of Hokitika, made a report and assessment for the Public Works Department of the proposed Haast Pass road in 1935. The report sparked the new Labour Government to approve the road from Bruce Bay to the Haast Pass, and also a road from Haast to Hollyford as part of the same project. Christie said that a road from the Arawhata River to the Upper Hollyford was estimated to cost £175,000. By 11 April advance workers on the Te Anau-Milford Sound Road had reached the 58-mile peg, approximately 5 miles (8.0 km) from the eastern entrance to the tunnel. By November, preparations were complete for the driving of a tunnel through the Homer Saddle at a height of 3,400 feet (1,000 m) above sea level. The work was expected to be slow but uneventful, with the bore passing through scree at both ends and solid granite in between. Power for the work's 12 compressed air drills was supplied by a hydro-electric plant situated about six miles from the scene of operations. Tunnelling was all done from the Southern end, as it was impossible to transfer materials and plant to the Cleddau Valley section. It was estimated that the 72-mile (116 km) road from Te Anau to Milford Sound would be completed by late 1937.

Later the same year J. Collins, New Zealand Trade Commissioner and representative of the Tourist and Publicity Department in Canada and the United States, stated that if the proper facilities were provided for travellers, the road to Milford would be travelled by 25,000 tourists during the summer season. A large number of those to visit the road would be New Zealanders, but if its attraction were given proper publicity abroad it would attract thousands of tourists from overseas. He advised that provision should be made, if possible, for air-strips.

The lower Hollyford end of the Haast–Hollyford road was started heading north from the Marian Corner in August 1936. Work was also started on the route the following month in South Westland, with the idea of providing relief work for the unemployed. Work was abandoned due to the necessities of the war effort in October 1940. This drew an end to work on the road until the 1960s.

=== 1946–1975 ===
Alice McKenzie's 1947 book Pioneers of Martins Bay: Life in New Zealand's Most Remote Settlement recorded the settlers' desire for a road over the Haast–Hollyford route. An appendix to the book by Dr F. G. Hall-Jones noted that settlers suspected Otago's provincial leaders would not support the road because it would lead directly from the Wakatipu goldfields to the Jackson Bay harbour and on to Australia, leaving Dunedin merchants "far out of the picture".

In 1961, the Labour Department made funds available for the employment of seasonal workers on the southern section of the road along the Hollyford Valley, which reached the Humboldt Falls (originally known as High Falls) where work continued until 1967. Only normal maintenance work has been carried out since, though from 1968 Westland County Council began building a road south towards the Hollyford Valley, eventually reaching Cascade Valley.

T.C.H. Mouatt made another report on the feasibility of a Haast–Hollyford road in 1964, stating that "the route is an obvious and desirable roading possibility". The following year Prime Minister Keith Holyoake opened the Haast Pass road. He stated at the time that he hoped to return to Westland in 10 years' time to open a completed Haast–Hollyford road.

In 1973, plans were made to mine high-grade asbestos from the Red Hills. Mackley and Graham Ferguson were employed by American mining company Kennecott Utah Copper Ltd and Cassiar Explorations Ltd, a Canadian company, to build a haul-road from the foot of the Red Hills to Big Bay. To get the machinery to Big Bay, it was driven through from Cascade Valley. Between June and October two bulldozers, a Caterpillar D8H and an International TD20 along with two support tractors, fuel sledges, a bunk-house, and cook-house traversed the country along the coast to the west end of the Pyke Gorge. Due to a fall in value of asbestos plans for the mine were abandoned. The Ferguson brothers retraced their tracks, arriving back at the Cascade Valley in December.

=== 1976–2000 ===
Further feasibility reports and engineering appraisals were made in 1976 by Ministry of Works engineer R.C. Holland, and in 1987 by Westland County manager Jon Olsen. The latter report estimated the cost of a road at $40 million. A further costing of the original inland route was done by McDermott Miller in 1989. This put the cost at $70 million. Later the same year the New Zealand Tourist and Publicity Department report, "Haast-Hollyford Road Reconnaissance" estimated the cost at $101.1 million.

The campaign for a road was bolstered by the move to name the South Island west coast as a World Heritage Site. A visit to the area in 1989 by conservationist Dr David Bellamy. Bellamy said that the road should be restarted as "travellers should have access to an area people have fought hard to preserve as a World Heritage Site". Minister of Tourism Jonathan Hunt, pledged support for a "World Heritage Drive", saying that he and then Minister of Conservation Philip Woollaston were in favour of the link, and that the proposal was on its way to the Parliamentary select committee for economic development. In 1990, 2.6 million hectares of land – almost 10% of New Zealand's total land area – was designated as the Te Wahipounamu World Heritage area. This area includes four national parks (Westland Tai Poutini, Aoraki / Mount Cook, Mount Aspiring and Fiordland), as well as the land beside and in between them.

At the opening of the new Milford Sound terminal building in 1992, New Zealand Minister of Tourism John Banks said "…. the completion of the Lower Hollyford–West Coast Road is the only safe logical step to increase tourism into this area…." Further encouragement for reconsidering a road option came from former Minister of Tourism Rob Talbot. Civil engineers Duffill Watts & King prepared a report on the preferred coastal route the following year, estimating a total capital cost of $85 million. Southland and Westland District Councils, McConnell Dowell and several members of parliament suggested that a coastal route could be open by 1997. Southland's Mayor Frana Cardno said the road would be a major tourist attraction in its own right. New proposals were detailed in an article in the Fiordland Focus which suggested that the proposed road would shorten the journey from Milford to Haast from five hours to two hours. The plan incorporated a number of new features, and favoured financing it from non-governmental sources, partly through making it a toll-road. The proposed road was designed to conform to high environmental standards.

In 1994, the Southland Times ran a series articles on the proposed road, written by Les Hutchins, a conservationist and tourism operator. Hutchins noted that the road over Wilmot Pass and the Milford Road were evidence that a link could be put through with minimum damage to the environment. He said there was no doubt the road would be of tremendous value to international and domestic tourism, and also noted the positive effect the proposed road would have on dangerous congestion problems on the Milford Road.

In August, the Southland and Westland District Councils gave their support to the link and began investigating its feasibility as a toll road using private funding. A toll of $20 per user was mooted. Both councils recognised the environmental value of the region and the need for any construction to be carried out to strict standards. On 30 August, representatives from both District Councils and the construction firm McConnell Dowell met the Ministers of Tourism and Conservation, and following that meeting suggested a feasibility study be prepared (study to cost $360,000) and a public consultation process started. In preparation for this the Westland District Council surveyed the road line down the Cascade Valley as far as Barn Bay in 1997, in a failed attempt to legalise that section of road.

On 20 September 2000, Nelson businessman Fred Willetts proposed in the Nelson Mail that a World Heritage Drive including both a Karamea–Collingwood road and a Haast–Hollyford road would bring unlimited opportunities to New Zealand, opening up tourism opportunities and employment for the country. Each road was estimated to cost around $130 million.

=== Since 2000 ===
In April 2001, a tabloid publication was circulated via daily newspapers in the South Island by backers of the plan for both the Haast-Hollyford and Karamea-Collingwood links. The publication was widely criticised by environmental groups, including Fish and Game New Zealand, the Royal Forest and Bird Protection Society of New Zealand and the Green Party.

Prior to the 2002 general election, the Leader of the Opposition Don Brash and others were given a reconnaissance helicopter flight over the full length of the route; all were very receptive to the concept and proposal.

In 2004, Ted Loose, Chairman of Environment Southland, said in an editorial that "since [a Haast-Hollyford road] was first mooted, progress has been stymied by people purporting to care about the social, economic, and ecological effects of building a road through a National Park. And all the while, problems associated with congestion at, and on the road to Milford have been escalating." The re-elected Mayor for Southland District, Frana Cardno, said in an editorial to the Southland Times on 9 October that the suggestion of the Haast–Hollyford road needed to be revived.

In 2005, the Department of Conservation called for submissions on a new conservation plan. The old plan had said a road through the Hollyford Valley was "unlikely". Over 800 submissions were put received on many issues, but a large proportion (over 500) were in support of a link road.

Submissions to the Westland District Council 2009-2019 Long Term Council Community Plan in 2009 supported the opening of the road. The Council passed a motion confirming their support for the proposed road and allocated $100,000 towards the gravelled road from Jackson Bay to the Cascade River.

In 2010, Christchurch businessman Earl Hagaman commissioned a report (the Octa Report) suggesting a toll road could be built for $225–315 million. Hagaman, founder of the Scenic Circle Hotels chain, argued the road would be of national significance, boosting the $21.7 billion tourism industry and significantly reducing driving time to Milford Sound. Minister of Economic Development Gerry Brownlee met with the Westland and Southland district councils and with Hagaman, saying "I'm personally supportive of [a road] but it's not something that the Government is actually considering at the present time." The Ministry of Economic Development briefly considered a new proposal for the road the same year, but did not see any net gain from an economic viewpoint.

In 2012 the property arm of the Westland District Council had signed a Memorandum of Understanding to build a toll road and is proceeding with the drafting of resource consents.

In 2013 it was revealed that Westland District Property Limited (the property arm of Westland District Council) would receive a $1 million success fee if consents for the road were granted. Westroads (Westland District Council's roading arm) were awarded a $30m contract to upgrade the section of the road between Arawhata and the Cascade.

== See also ==
- New Zealand state highway network
- Environment of New Zealand
- Tourism in New Zealand
- Environmental impact of roads
