= Hollyford =

Hollyford may refer to:

- Hollyford, County Tipperary, Ireland
- Hollyford Track, in New Zealand
- Hollyford River, in New Zealand
