= Forgotten River =

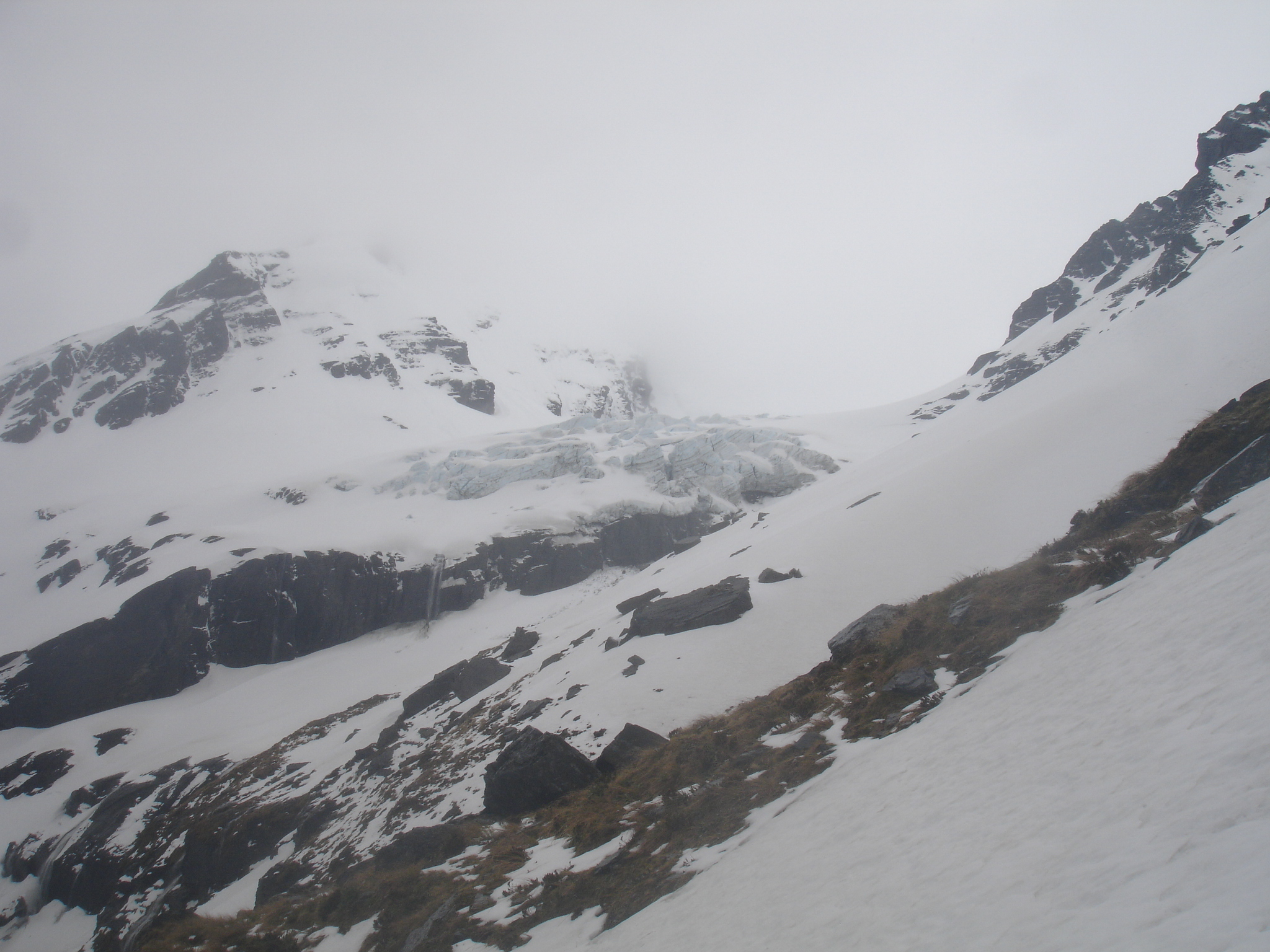
- Upper Forgotten River and edge of the Olivine Ice Plateau, New Zealand
- Route of the Forgotten River
- Mouth of the Forgotten River Forgotten River (South Island) Forgotten River (New Zealand)

Location
- Country: New Zealand

Physical characteristics
- Source: Forgotten River Col
  - location: 1,827 metres (5,994 ft)
  - coordinates: 44°26′28″S 168°20′39″E
- Mouth
  - location: Olivine River
  - coordinates: 44°28′34″S 168°16′02″E

Basin features
- Progression: Forgotten River → Olivine River → Pyke River → Hollyford River / Whakatipu Kā Tuka → Tasman Sea
- Tributaries
  - left: Blockade Stream, Milner Ice Stream

The Forgotten River is located in northern Fiordland, New Zealand in Mount Aspiring National Park, and is a tributary of the Olivine River. The Forgotten River starts at the Forgotten River Col at the western edge of the Olivine Ice Plateau in the Five Finger Range. It flows south-westward to join the Olivine River as a hanging valley south of Four Brothers Pass.

The river was explored in 1864 by Alphonse Barrington, James Farrell and Antoine Simonin. It is currently within the Olivine Wilderness Area which has limited aircraft access.

== See also ==
- List of rivers of New Zealand
