= Lake Alabaster =

Lake in New Zealand

Lake Alabaster / Wāwāhi Waka
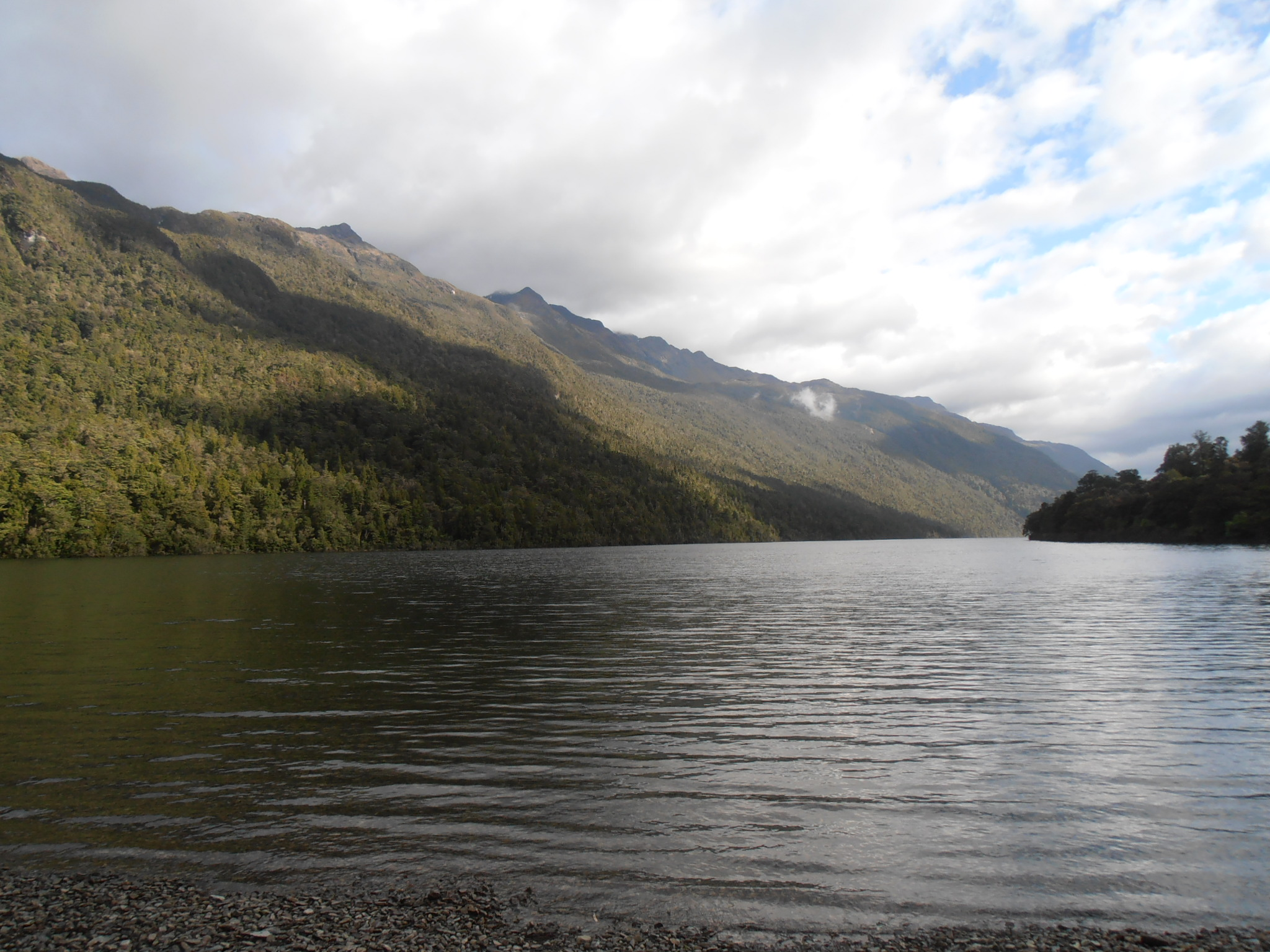
- Lake Alabaster at the Hollyford Track, New Zealand.

- Location within New Zealand
- Interactive map of Lake Alabaster / Wāwāhi Waka
- Location: South Island
- Coordinates: 44°31′S 168°10′E
- Primary inflows: Pyke River
- Primary outflows: Pyke River
- Basin countries: New Zealand
- Max. length: 6 km (3.7 mi)
- Surface area: 7 km^{2} (2.7 sq mi)

Lake Alabaster / Wāwāhi Waka, also known by the Māori name of Waiwahuika, lies at the northern end of Fiordland, in the southwest of New Zealand's South Island. The lake runs from northeast to southwest, is five kilometres (3.1 mi), and covers seven km^{2} (2.7 sq mi).

Lake Alabaster drains, and is drained by, the Pyke River, a small tributary of the Hollyford River / Whakatipu Kā Tuka. It is one of two lakes (along with Lake McKerrow / Whakatipu Waitai) found in the lower reaches of the Hollyford River system. A branch of the Hollyford Track, one of New Zealand's most well-known and popular tramping tracks, extends along the eastern shore of the lake.

The lake was formed at the southern end of a glacial valley and, had the sea level been slightly higher, would have been the northern arm of what might have been McKerrow Fiord.
