= Transport in Milford Sound =

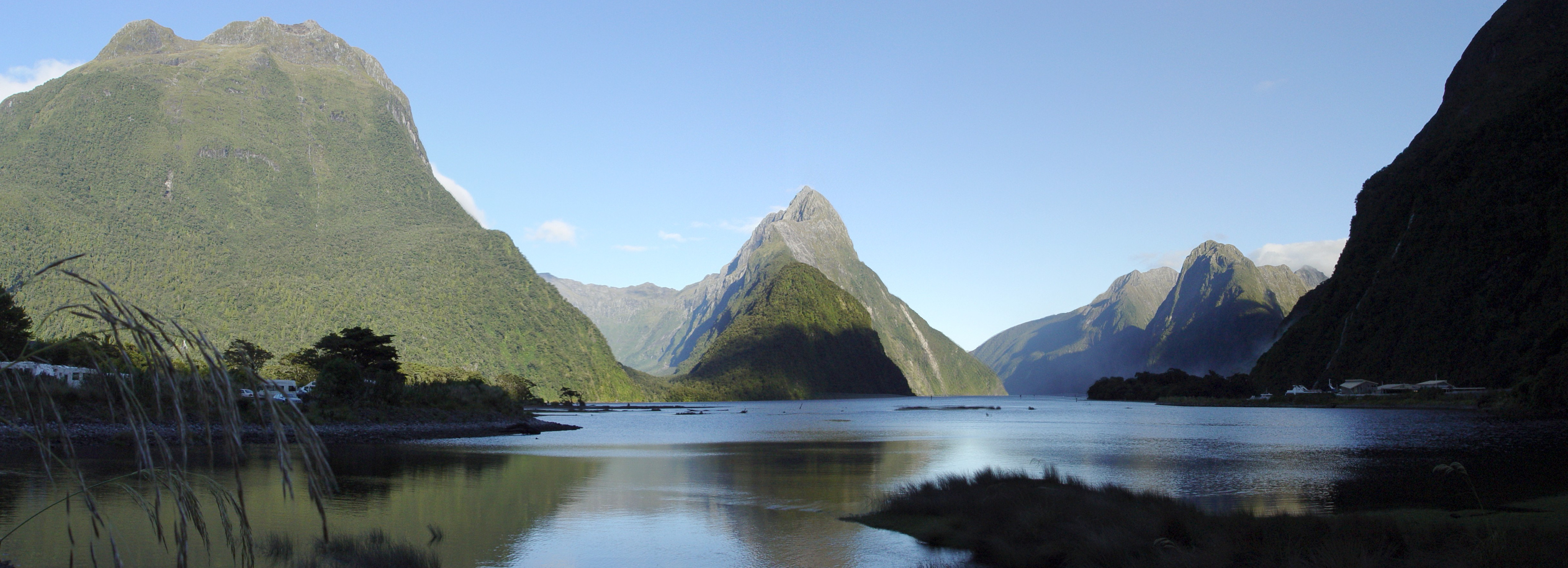
Milford Sound – Mitre Peak visited by over half a million visitors per year.

Transport in Milford Sound in New Zealand is characterised by the remoteness of the area in which it is located. As a popular tourism destination in the South Island, Milford Sound (the fiord) and the village of the same name receive very large numbers of visitors. These tend to arrive and depart within just a few hours each day, as there is little accommodation at the village, leading to strong demand peaks for tourism services during the noon and early afternoon period. The journey from Te Anau is rated as one of the most photographic drives of the world.

To reduce this peaking and to allow further expansion without impacting the environment or reducing tourist amenity, various schemes have been proposed over the years for better links to the Sound, including a new tunnel, a monorail and a gondola lift.

== Overview ==
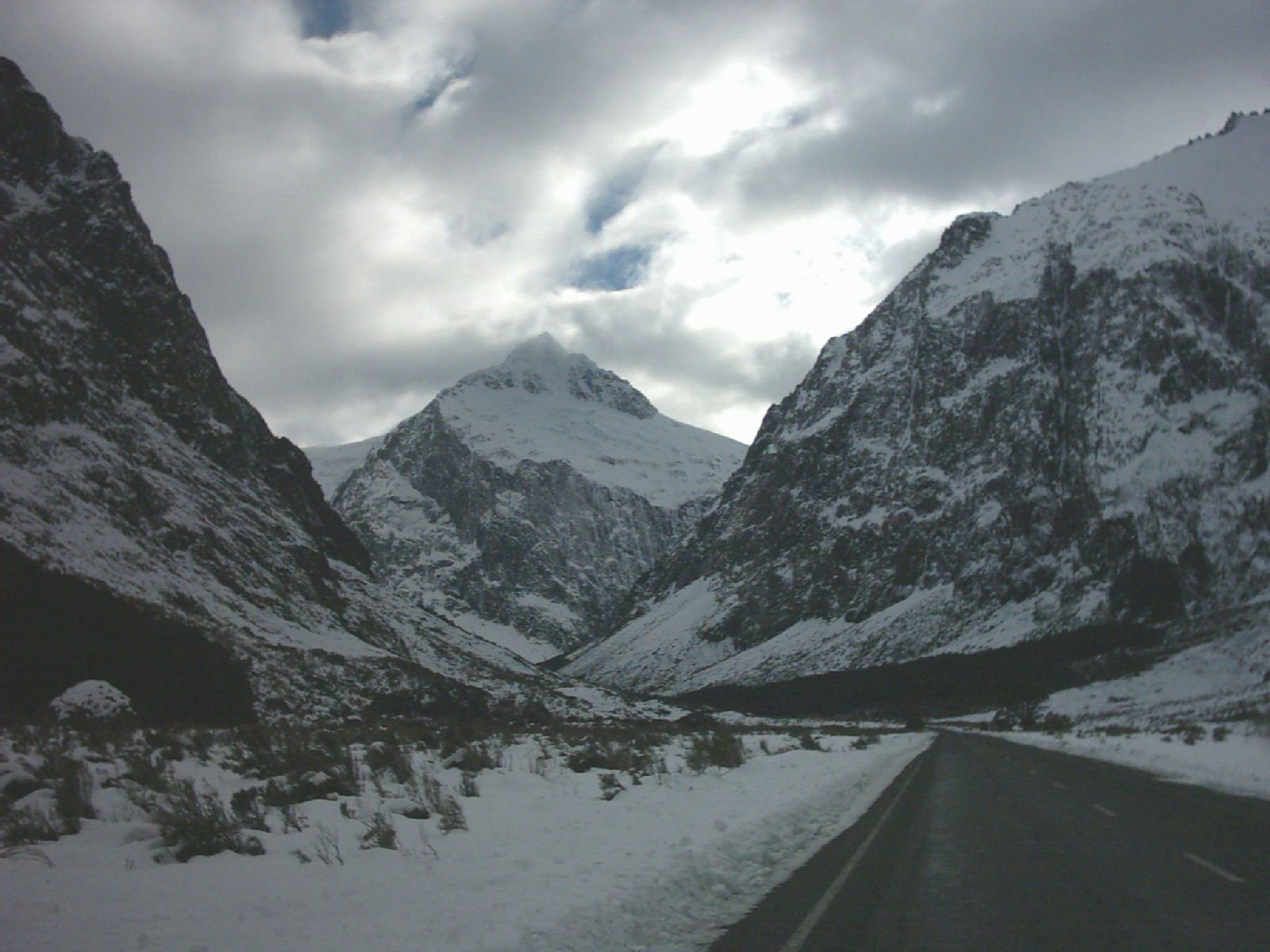
The avalanche-prone Milford Road.

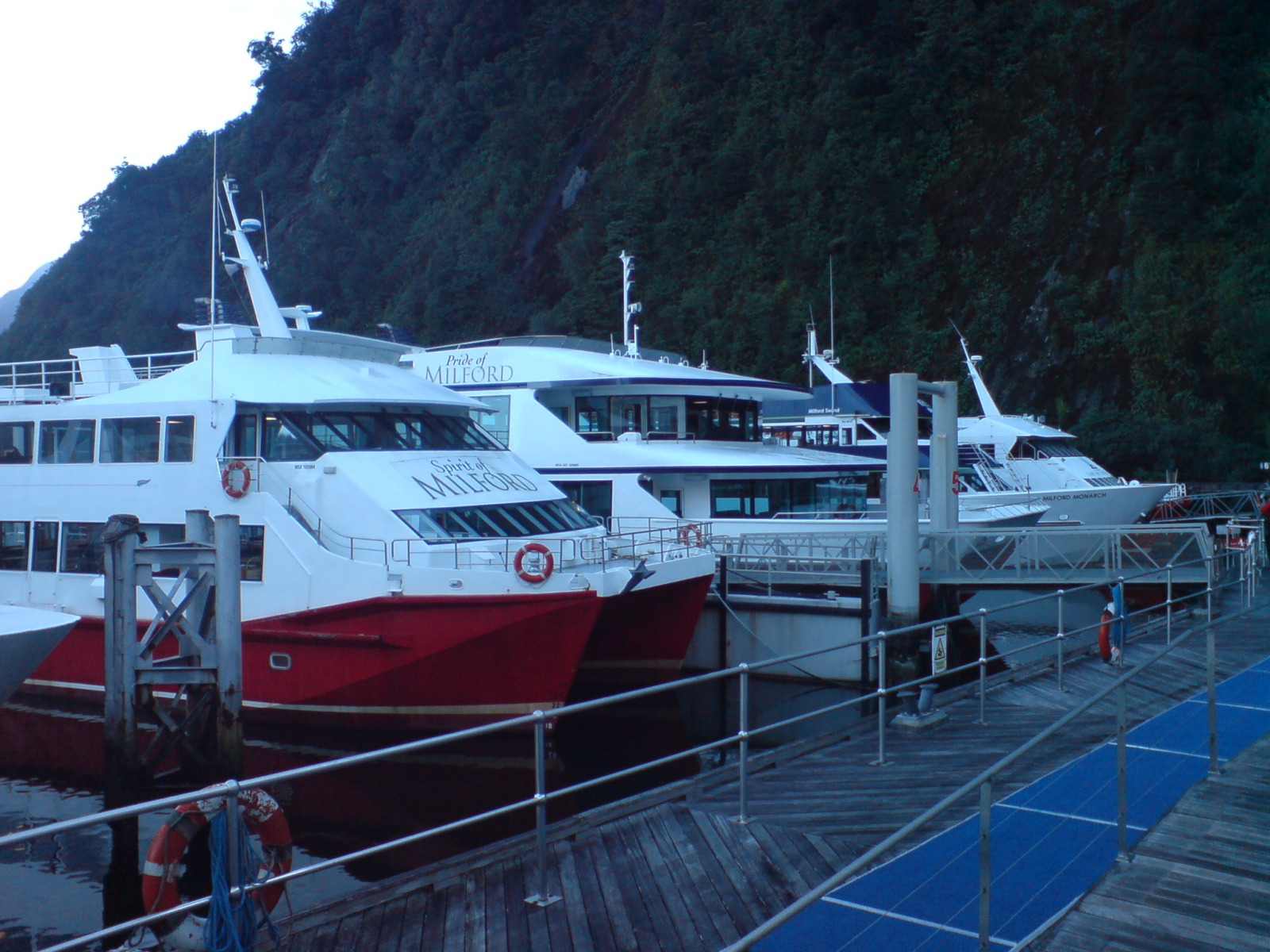
Tourist day-cruise boats awaiting a short but busy day.

=== Remote location ===
Milford Sound is a fjord in the southwest of the South Island of New Zealand, located in Fiordland, the most remote and least populated region of the country. Divided from more populous areas to the east by the high southern spurs of the Southern Alps, its only entry apart from a difficult mountain road is a narrow channel to the Tasman Sea, which explorer Captain Cook did not enter or describe during his 1769/1770 journey with HMS Endeavour's mapped course well off this portion of coast.

=== Communication ===
The first post office of the fjord was a tiny island. A rum barrel was hung on a tree where mail was posted and a white flag was raised to indicate unsent mail. Passing ships would then stop and browse the mails. If any were addressed to a location they were heading they would take it with them.

=== Tourism bottleneck ===
By virtue of its great natural features, Milford Sound has long since become a major tourist attraction, receiving numbers of visitors unprecedented for such a remote location, over 550,000 per year. This was expected to rise to 750,000 by 2012. While this expected rise in numbers did not happen immediately, by 2019 before the COVID pandemic, about 1,230,000 visited per annum (including crew in cruise ships). During 2025, Milford Sound received a total of 826,633 Visitors with growth rate of 10% over the previous year. A study had found that of all tourists travelling the South Island of New Zealand in summer, 54% travelled the Milford Road at some point.

Increasing the difficulties for tourism to the sound is the location within Fiordland National Park, which prevents substantial accommodation from being built - around 90% of all tourists are therefore only on a day trip, and around 80% return in the late afternoon to Te Anau, or Queenstown, a 12-hour round trip. Due to the long trip from Queenstown, a majority of tourists arrive and depart quickly, leading to a great peaking of demand at the day-cruises terminal where the large tourist boats lie empty for most of the day, becoming extremely active only during the 3–4 hours around and past noon.

The above difficulties in reaching this extremely popular destination have led to a number of serious proposals on how to better connect the attractions of Milford Sound to the rest of New Zealand, and how to increase tourism without reducing sustainability for this national natural treasure. In conjunction with these plans, proposals are also being considered how to upgrade the existing road to Milford Sound.

== Existing travel methods ==
=== Motor vehicle ===
Tourists to Milford Sound arrive mainly via coach over Milford Road State Highway 94, a high mountain road prone to avalanches in winter. In 2019 about 870,000 people visited by road. The road was only opened in 1953, after Homer Tunnel was finished after almost 20 years of intermittent work. The road is one of the more dangerous public roads in New Zealand, with injury crash rates around 65% higher than the rest of New Zealand's network, and a fatality crash rate of almost twice average (per vehicle kilometre travelled), making it the third most dangerous section of New Zealand's State Highway network (as of 2008).

Stopping is prohibited on long stretches due to rock or snow avalanche dangers, and the road is often closed in winter, with the carrying of snow chains mandatory during snow conditions. Helicopters are used during winter to drop explosives onto snow buildup zones above the road in order to cause controlled avalanches, and the avalanche control programme is world-renowned. However even this does not absolutely eliminate the danger that road traffic may be hit by an uncontrolled event, especially in the area of the Homer Tunnel portals. The last known fatality from an avalanche on the road was in 1983. Drivers are encouraged to start the drive from Te Anau with full tanks of fuel, as there are very limited options to refuel thereafter. All of this does not discourage up to 50 coaches and hundreds of private cars daily from making the 608 km round trip from Queenstown (slightly less from Invercargill). Almost 60% travelled via coach.

Future increases in traffic will have to take into account the limitations of the existing road, which features various areas lacking passing lanes (especially problematic if cars are held up behind slow coaches on the steeper sections), a number of one-lane bridges and a narrow carriageway width. The Homer Tunnel is a traffic-light controlled one-way route during peak summer periods, as it is not wide enough to allow coaches to pass each other (though passing bays are provided). Improvements to both the road and Homer Tunnel are planned by Transit New Zealand, though a widening of the tunnel is considered unlikely due to the high costs involved.

In the 2010s, the road received a variable message sign (VMS) traffic information system to inform travellers on the road of incidents and closures, in a more timely fashion than the old, hand-changed signs. The system received a 2012 New Zealand Engineering Excellence Award, partly due to the information system using satellite links as their primary communication system making unnecessary the much more costly laying of communications cables along the road. The message signs are powered by small hydro-power systems with battery back-ups.

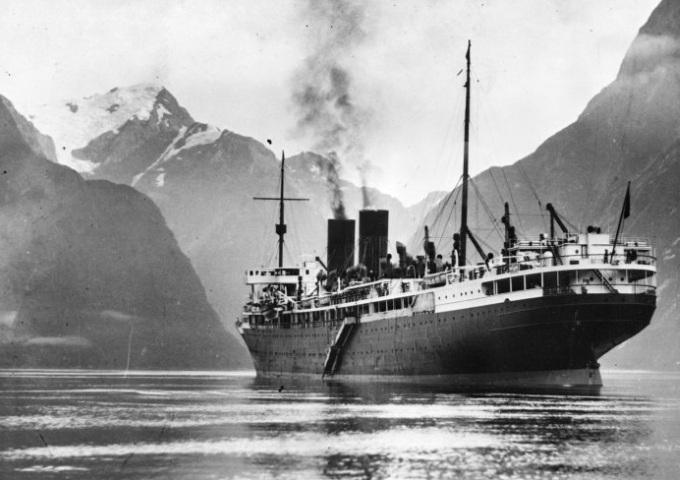
The Monowai in the Sound in 1933.

=== Watercraft ===
An increasing number of tourists arrive via long-distance sea travel, such as on cruise ships entering the sound while stopping over in New Zealand from overseas or travelling from (the relatively distant) New Zealand harbours, or alternatively on private yachts. By 2019 the combined numbers of passengers and crew on cruise ships had reached 300,000. Few smaller vessels outside the cruise ship trade presently travel along the rugged southwest coastline of the Island to visit the sound, but numbers are unknown.

=== Aircraft ===
Numbers of tourists arrive via small planes or helicopters, or use them to overfly the Sound as part of the trip. In 2004, Milford Sound Airport had approximately 16,000 aircraft movements, most associated with flights to and from Queenstown. Around 35 aircraft can operate at the airport at any one time, though this level has not yet been reached. As flights can be spread over the day better than coach trips, only about 25 aircraft operated here during peak times of the day in 2004. In 2019, 60,000 tourists accessed Milford Sound by air.

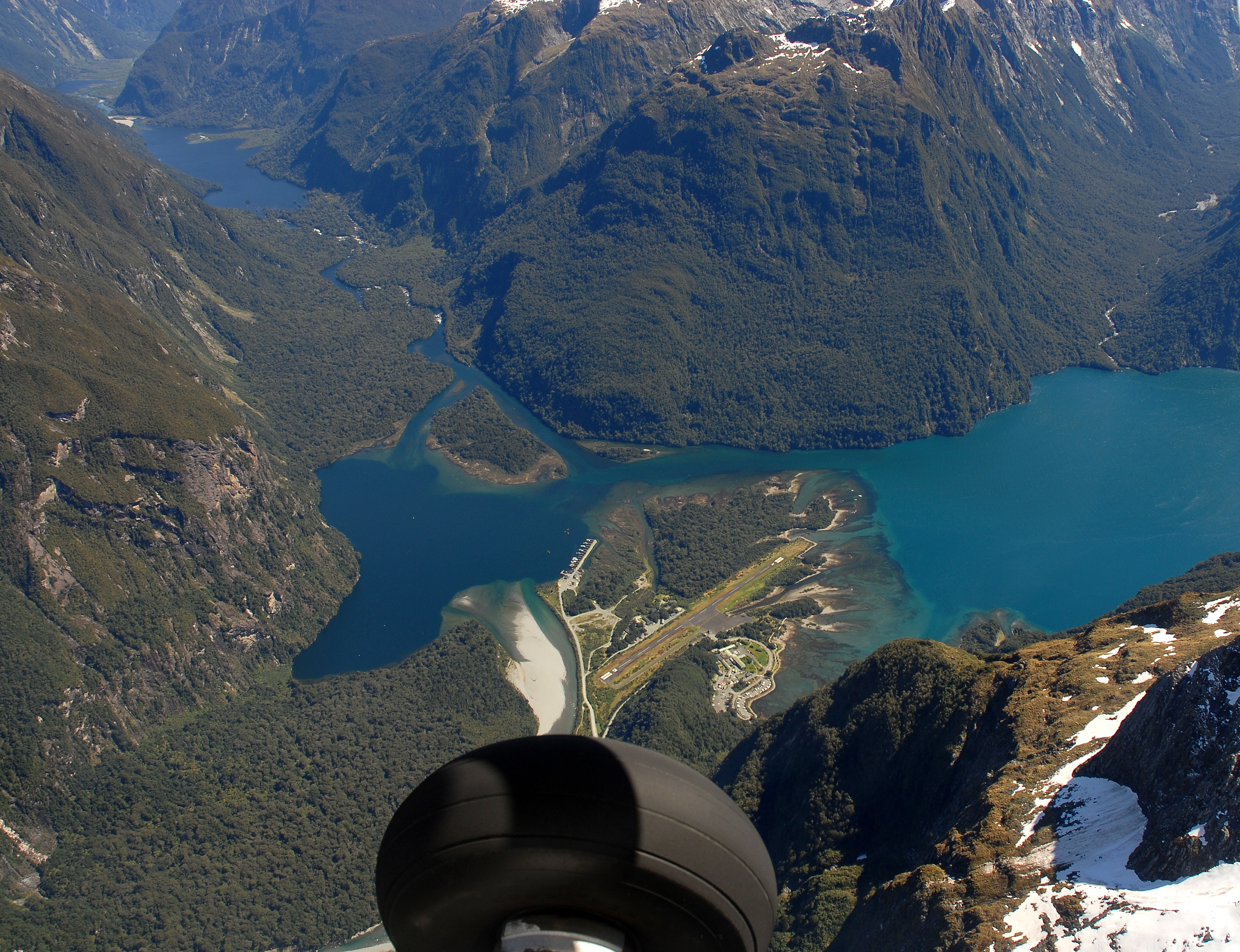
Milford Sound from the air, with the airfield in the centre. The main tourist boat marina is hidden below the mountainface to the lower right.

The Department of Conservation has noted that aircraft noise and activity in the Sound are often remarked on by tourists as being unexpectedly substantial (even more so on the nearby Milford Track). DOC is therefore encouraging the use of larger and less noisy aircraft. In 2007, flight restrictions were announced, limiting the number of flights in the Fiordland area and the number of operators to 2004-2005 levels via a concession system, with 23 licenses only (the number of operators in 2004-2005). Operators are also required to pay for flight monitoring, and further restrictions may be declared if more than 25% of National Park visitors consider the aircraft noise annoying. Some operators have already complained about the restrictions, and DOC has noted that flight numbers could conceivably be increased if noise emissions would be reduced.

=== Walking ===
There exists one main track into Milford Sound from the eastern side of the main range of the Southern Alps, the Milford Track. Starting at the northernmost edge of Lake Te Anau, the 53 km (33 mi) track takes four days to complete and includes one mountain pass and many areas prone to flooding. Due to concerns about degrading the natural landscape, the track can be walked on a quota system only (and only westwards, with walkers having to stop at designated huts every night). With only several dozen walkers allowed on the track every day, places in the quota system are usually booked out many months in advance from the administering New Zealand Department of Conservation.

== Proposed improvements ==
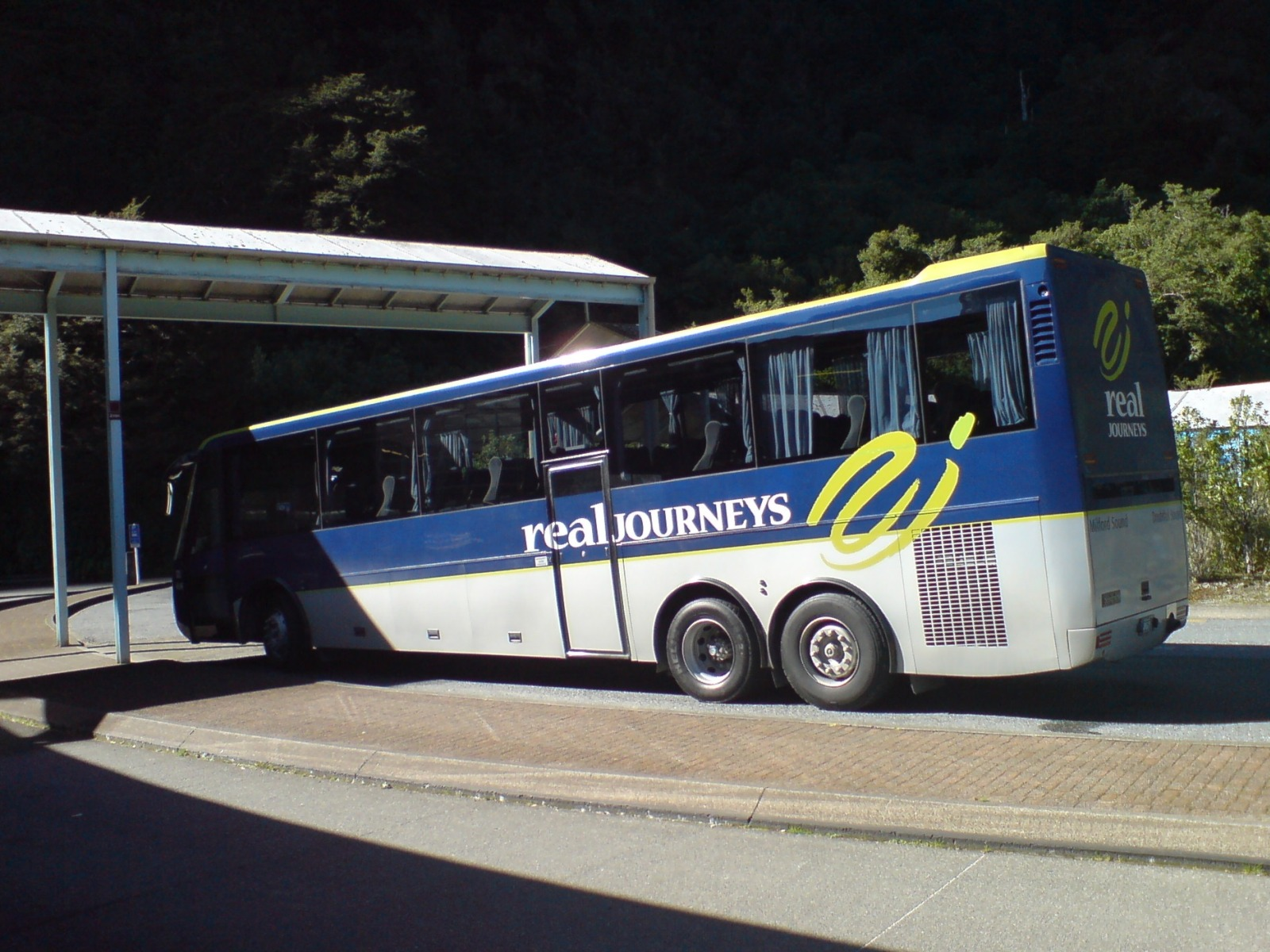
The coaches of some operators such as Real Journeys are built to improve the view through their glass roofs.

=== Bus pooling ===
In winter, during those times that the road remains open, coach numbers on the Milford Road have been observed as not dropping in the same degree as visitor numbers, with coaches often travelling largely empty. It has been proposed that initiatives be considered to force or entice tourism operators to pool their transport resources for greater efficiency.

=== Mandatory park & ride ===
It has been proposed that a park & ride shuttle bus facility should be established at a location such as Te Anau, Te Anau Downs or Eglinton Valley. Access to Milford Sound would be restricted to bus shuttles operating from here (and private vehicles during off-peak times). Staggering the departure would help reduce congestion both on the road and at the viewing spots. However, the proposal was considered to reduce tourism operator and tourist freedom, as well as to add transfer times to an already very long journey. Finally, it would take away the free right of access. As such, it was negatively reviewed and is unlikely to proceed.

=== Other options ===
Expanding Milford Sound Airport to allow larger aircraft to fly tour groups in and out of the sound was also considered, but considered problematic for tourist amenity in the Sound, and for reasons of high travel cost.

Other options considered were the limitation of access to certified/compliant users (i.e. bus companies, similar to the 'mandatory park & ride' option), introducing a booking system for 'road slots', or the placing of tolls along the Milford Road. All these methods share problems of restricting access, therefore making visits to Milford Sound more complicated and costly.

== Proposed new methods ==
=== Haast-Hollyford Highway ===
The Haast-Hollyford road or Haast-Hollyford Highway is a long-standing proposal to link Haast, a coastal town north of Milford Sound, via the Hollyford Valley to Milford Sound and Te Anau in the South Island of New Zealand. Proposals for this road have been mooted since the 1880s. It would allow a multi-day round trip, for example from Queenstown to Te Anau to Milford Sound to Haast and back to Queenstown. However, high costs associated with building around 120 km (75 mi) of new road in a remote area (estimated at NZ$165–275 million) and issues with constructing a new road through Fiordland National Park were noted, in addition to the new route possibly increasing congestion on the shared part of the route (from the Hollyford Valley to Milford Sound).

In April 2001, a tabloid publication was circulated via daily newspapers in the South Island by backers of the plan for the Haast-Hollyford link. The publication was widely criticised by environmentalist groups, including Fish and Game New Zealand, the Royal Forest and Bird Protection Society of New Zealand and the Green Party.

Submissions to the Westland District Council 2009-2019 Long Term Council Community Plan in 2009 supported the opening of the road. The Council passed a motion of support for the proposed road and allocated $100,000 towards improving the gravelled road from Jackson Bay to the Cascade River.

In 2010, Christchurch businessman Earl Hagaman commissioned a report (the Octa Report) suggesting a toll road could be built for $225–315 million. Hagaman, founder of the Scenic Circle Hotels chain, argued the road would be of national significance, boosting the $21.7 billion tourism industry and significantly reducing driving time to Milford Sound. Construction was estimated to cost up to $315 million (and annual maintenance of over $1 million). According to the study, the costs would be acceptable due to the local benefits and additional tourism income it would provide, though conservation groups oppose the project.

In March 2010, Minister of Economic Development Gerry Brownlee met with the Westland and Southland district councils and with Hagaman, saying "I'm personally supportive of [a road] but it's not something that the Government is actually considering at the present time." The Ministry of Economic Development had briefly considered a new proposal for the road the same year, but did not see any net gain from an economic viewpoint.

== Rejected proposed new methods ==
=== Fiordland Link Experience (rejected by NZ government 2014) ===
This proposal intended to combine a number of innovative transport options into one trip (hence 'Experience'), while still cutting the travelling time to the Sound by about one hour each way (previous hopes of longer savings seem unlikely to be realised). In Queenstown travellers would have boarded 25 m (82 ft) catamarans capable of carrying up to 240 people. These would cross Lake Wakatipu to the south-western shore, 20 km (12 mi) away. There, passengers would travel up the mountain on an existing back-country road, using specially constructed all-terrain coaches on balloon tyres (to reduce impact on the road).

Arriving at the Kiwi Burn swing bridge terminal, tourists will continue on a mechanical (as opposed to maglev) monorail travelling 35 minutes through high country and native bush for a distance of 41 km (25 mi), which would be the longest monorail connection in the world, before joining up with a bus park and ride facility on the existing road to Milford Sound north of Te Anau. Three passing loops along the line would allow four trains to run, at speeds of up to 90 km/h (56 mph). Kiwi Burns Saddle, the highest point of the journey, is 675 m (2,215 ft) above sea level, and the higher-altitude section of the rail would be heated to prevent snow-buildup in winter. Each monorail train would seat 160 passengers, consisting of 16 articulated 2.6 m (8 ft 6 in) wide sections totalling 66 m (217 ft) in length. Only one train would be constructed initially.

The proposal, which would have cost up to NZ$132 million, would have to achieve around 220,000 two-way passengers per year to be viable. Compared to the Milford Dart project, the backers, Infinity Investment Group, believed that they would have an easier time achieving consents, as the proposal does not touch upon any National Parks, and the construction and operation process was considered to be very ecologically sustainable, such as the use of comparatively small piles for the monorail which will be bored and placed from a working vehicle moving forward on the rail being constructed, thus making construction roads unnecessary. Originally it was hoped that the consent process would start in mid 2007, with commercial operations beginning in 2011. That, however, did not happen. In October 2013 it was reported that the New Zealand Conservation Minister was supportive of the project." On 29 May 2014, the Conservation Minister Nick Smith rejected the proposal saying the $240 million plan "does not stack up either economically or environmentally."

=== Milford Dart tunnel (rejected by NZ government 2013) ===
Combining a new tunnel with special-purpose guided buses to avoid the southern detour to Te Anau on the route from Queenstown to Milford Sound, this proposal would provide the shortest possible route. Proposed by a group of South Island businessmen who also have an interest in some of the tourist operations in the Sound, this scheme would make use of the fact that the Hollyford Valley, where the existing road to Milford Sound from Te Anau turns west up to Homer Tunnel, is only a short distance away from the Routeburn Valley (of Routeburn Track fame), in turn easily reached by existing roads.

The proposal would have created an 11.3 km (7.0 mi) tunnel through the mountain range and link up the existing roads with short extensions, cutting travel distances from 304 km (189 mi) one-way to only 125 km (78 mi), with travel time reduced from 5.5 hours to 2 hours. Within the tunnel, buses would make use of guidance technology (side-facing wheels) to allow them to travel in a tunnel with much smaller diameter than usual, thus reducing construction costs. Speeds within the tunnel are expected to be up to 80 km/h (50 mph) at up to 2.5-minute frequency. The tunnel is expected to have to take at least 200,000 passengers per year to be commercially viable, and would cost around NZ$150 million. This cost is based on very little research, the ground has not had the sufficient surveying to calculate an accurate cost. The cost is likely to be much higher, seeing as the tunnel is going through 5 known fault lines.

The proposed tunnel faces a number of criticisms. One of the major hindrances is the location of both entrances in national parks, Fiordland National Park in the west and Mount Aspiring National Park in the east. While the proposed new road sections would be very short, they have already led to criticism from the environmental group Forest and Bird which noted that the Department of Conservations's general policy forbids the construction of new roads in National Parks. The disposal of up to 250,000 cubic metres (8,800,000 cubic feet) of soil from the tunnel excavation is also considered problematic. Southland and Te Anau business interests are also concerned that the tunnel proposal will cause tourism to bypass Te Anau and overwhelm Glenorchy.

In December 2007, the New Zealand Conservation Authority decided not to approve an amendment to the Mount Aspiring National Park Management Plan that would have allowed the tunnel to be built in the Mount Aspiring National Park. The plan amendment had been supported by the Otago Conservation Board and the Director-General of Conservation.

The Royal Forest and Bird Protection Society of New Zealand said that the proposal is inconsistent with the National Parks Act, the Conservation Act, and the Fiordland and Mt Aspiring National Park Plans and that it is also inconsistent with the General Policy for National Parks.

In January 2012, Minister of Conservation Kate Wilkinson gave notice of her intention to grant a concession for the Milford Dart proposal, subject to public submissions and hearings.

Southland District Council Mayor Frana Cardno submitted that the Department of Conservation's support of the proposal was inconsistent with the values of World Heritage status associated with Fiordland National Park.

In mid 2013, the application for consent for the tunnel was rejected by the Minister for the Environment, for three reasons - the need to dispose of half a million of tonnes of tunnel spoil, the impacts of new roads and tunnel portals on the park and the Routeburn Track, and due to the works being inconsistent with the national park management plan. The minister also noted doubts about the economic viability of the $170 million project.

=== Sky Trail Milford (rejected by NZ government 2004) ===
A third option, previously proposed around 2001, would have created a gondola route between the Caples Valley and the Hollyford Valley. The proposal was a cooperation between Skyline Enterprises of Queenstown and Rotorua, and the Ngāi Tahu iwi, and was to cost around NZ$100–110 million. With 12.6 km (7.8 mi) length, the Skytrail would have become the longest such ride in the Southern Hemisphere, and was intended to transport 900 passengers per hour. With a duration of 35 minutes for a one-way trip, the gondola was to reduce the 12-hour round trip by about 3 hours.

The project was shelved after the Department of Conservation refused permission based on its expected impact on the pristine wilderness it was to cross. Critics such as Forest and Bird Society had, amongst other reasons, protested against the destruction of beech forest for 85 towers and 2 transfer stations, bus traffic on previously less used roads, and the despoiling of natural landscapes by gondola traffic. There was also some concern about the location of the Skytrail in an area of strong seismic and wind activity.

=== Other options ===
Further options considered at some stage in the recent decade included a new one-way route (Queenstown-Milford Sound) via Glenorchy (northwest of Queenstown) and through a tunnel in the Darran Mountains (reducing the one-way trip to the Sound from five hours to two hours). The scheme had some similarities to the 'Milford Dart' scheme, but apparently did not go forward apparently due to the high difficulties faced with building new infrastructure in the two national parks.

== Other constraints ==
Milford Sound is at risk of significant major landslide events, which in a worst case scenario could lead to the deaths of about 750 visitors in one event. This is a significant societal risk. Individual risk has been estimated for a visitor on 2019 modelling as 6.8 × 10^{−7}, which is less than 1 in a million, and two orders of magnitude less than the now known risk of visiting Whakaari / White Island, an active volcano, as a tourist. However the societal risk is higher than the level determined to be significant in New Zealand after the 2019 Whakaari / White Island eruption because Milford Sound is a much more popular tourist destination. A decision on whether or not to accept the societal risk and its consequences of this expected disaster has been identified as the responsibility of the government of New Zealand, and has yet to be made in the context of existing transport infrastructure or any proposals to enhance them.

== See also ==
- Homer Tunnel
- Real Journeys
