= Barrier River =

River in New Zealand

- Route of the Barrier River
- Mouth of the Barrier River Barrier River (South Island) Barrier River (New Zealand)
- Native name: Waikea

Location
- Country: New Zealand
- Region: Southland
- District: Southland

Physical characteristics
- Source: Barrier River North Branch
  - location: The Furies Ridge
  - coordinates: 44.3900°S 168.3381°E
- 2nd source: Barrier River South Branch
  - location: Barrier Ice Stream
  - coordinates: 44.4284°S 168.3348°E
- Mouth
  - location: Pyke River
  - coordinates: 44°24′50″S 168°12′45″E

Basin features
- Progression: Barrier River → Pyke River → Hollyford River / Whakatipu Kā Tuka → Tasman Sea
- Tributaries
  - left: Silver Stream (North Branch),
  - right: Saddle Stream, Red Stream

The Barrier River is a river in the Mount Aspiring National Park in northern Southland, New Zealand. It is a tributary of the Pyke River, which it enters about 1 kilometre (0.6 mi) south of Lake Wilmot. The Barrier River is fed by three glaciers and ice fields:

- Demon Gap Icefall (North Branch)
- Silver Glacier (via Silver Stream, between the branches)
- Barrier Ice Stream (South Branch)

== See also ==
- List of rivers of New Zealand
