= Red Pyke River =

- Route of Red Pyke River
- Mouth of Red Pyke River Red Pyke River (South Island) Red Pyke River (New Zealand)

Location
- Country: New Zealand
- Region: Southland
- District: Southland

Physical characteristics
- Source
  - coordinates: 44°16′58″S 168°19′44″E
- Mouth
  - location: Pyke River
  - coordinates: 44°19′11″S 168°17′48″E

Basin features
- Progression: Pyke River → Pyke River → Hollyford River / Whakatipu Kā Tuka → Tasman Sea
- Tributaries
  - left: Peridot Stream

The Red Pyke River is a river in northern Fiordland, New Zealand, located in Mount Aspiring National Park. It is a tributary of the Pyke River, rising east of Telescope Hill and flowing southwards to join the Pyke River at Pyke Gorge, west of Red Mountain.

== See also ==
- List of rivers of New Zealand
