= Wilmot River =

- Route of Wilmot River
- Mouth of Wilmot River Wilmot River (South Island) Wilmot River (New Zealand)

Location
- Country: New Zealand
- Region: Southland
- District: Southland

Physical characteristics
- Source
  - location: Skippers Range
  - coordinates: 44°25′37″S 168°09′18″E
- Mouth
  - location: Lake Wilmot
  - coordinates: 44°22′26″S 168°12′33″E
  - elevation: 30 metres (98 ft)
- Length: 13 kilometres (8.1 mi)

Basin features
- Progression: Wilmot River → Lake Wilmot → Pyke River → Hollyford River / Whakatipu Kā Tuka → Tasman Sea
- River system: Hollyford River / Whakatipu Kā Tuka

The Wilmot River is a river of northern Fiordland, New Zealand. It rises in the Skippers Range and flows into Lake Wilmot.

== See also ==
- List of rivers of New Zealand
