= Olivine Ice Plateau =

Glacier in New Zealand

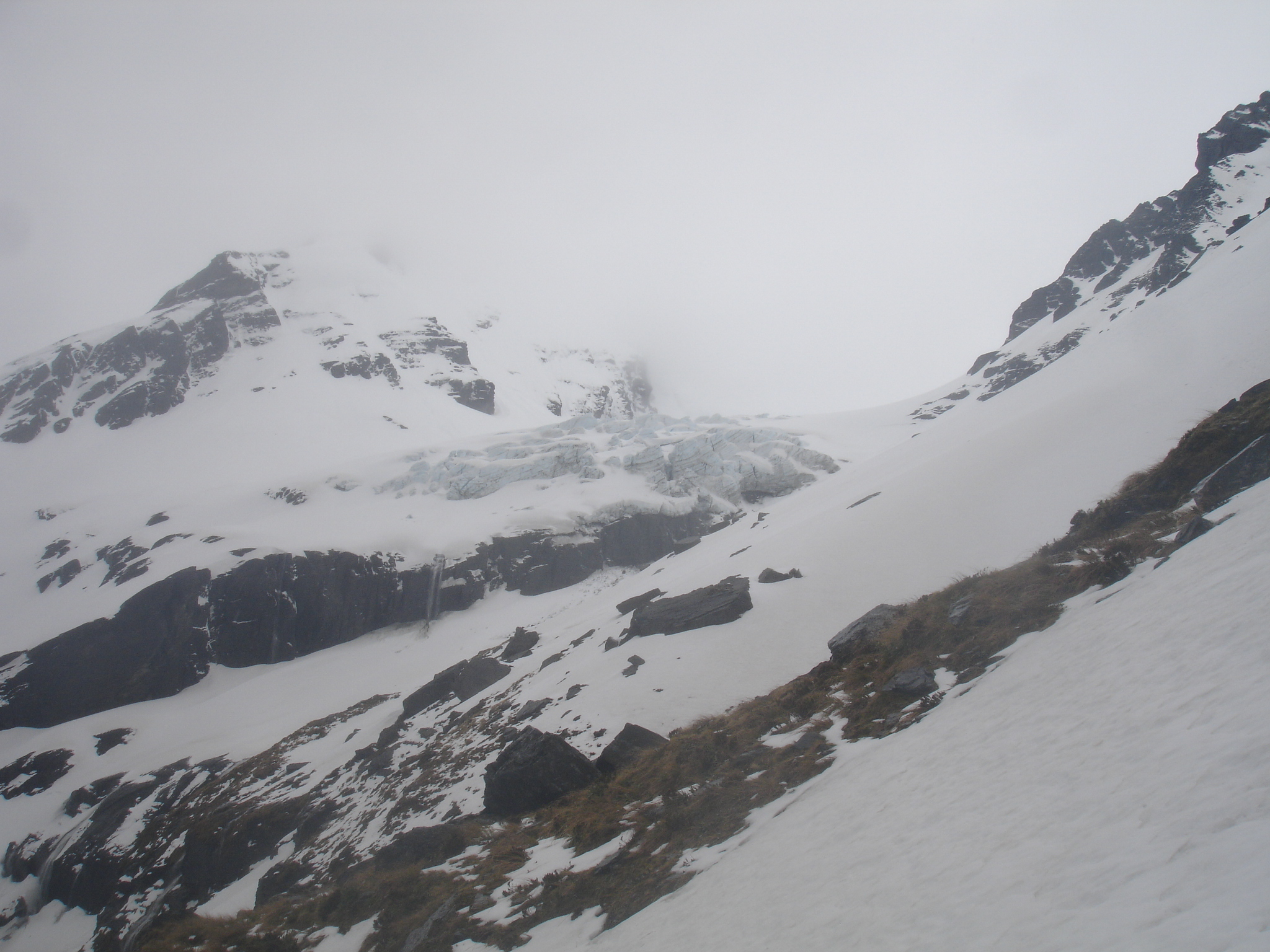
- Upper Forgotten River and edge of the Olivine Ice Plateau
- Interactive map of Olivine Ice Plateau
- Location: Five Finger Range
- Coordinates: 44.440594°S 168.366606°E
- Highest elevation: 2,200 m (7,200 ft)
- Lowest elevation: 700 m (2,300 ft)

The Olivine Ice Plateau is a glacier in the Olivine Wilderness Area and Mount Aspiring National Park in New Zealand's South Island. The plateau is named after the mineral olivine, which is common within the Dun Mountain ophiolite that underlies the area. The plateau extents to the west over the Forgotten River Col into the Forgotten River, and to the north it merges with the Andy Glacier, which feeds a tributary of the Arawhata River. The Olivine Ice Plateau is one of many glaciers in the region of the Arawhata, Dart / Te Awa Whakatipu, Hollyford / Whakatipu Kā Tuka and Matukituki rivers' headwaters.

The area was explored and mapped in the 1930s by J.T. Holloway. In the 2010s the glacier has retreated, leading to a more rocky approach to the plateau over the Forgotten River Col. The plateau is "revered" by New Zealand trampers for its remote and challenging location.

== See also ==
- Glaciers of New Zealand
