= Martins Bay =

Bay in New Zealand's South Island

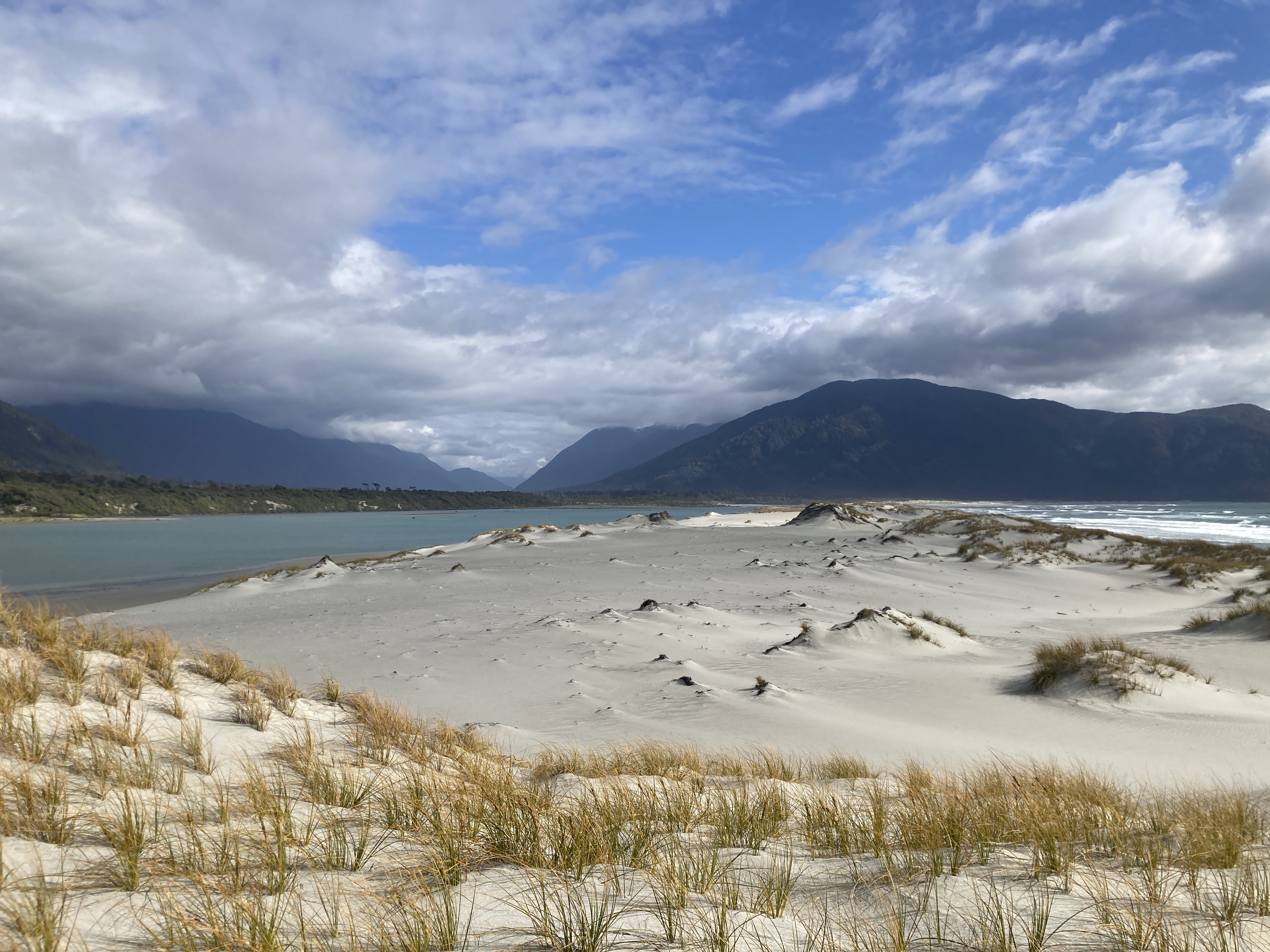

- Location Martins Bay (South Island) Martins Bay (New Zealand)
- Location: Fiordland, Southland District, New Zealand
- Coordinates: 44.362°S 167.985°E
- River sources: Hollyford River

Martins Bay (Whakatipu Waitai or Te Remu) is an indentation in the southwest coast of New Zealand's South Island. It lies immediately to the south of Big Bay and some 30 kilometres north of the mouth of Milford Sound at the northern tip of Fiordland. The Hollyford River reaches the Tasman Sea at Martins Bay.

The area around the bay is uninhabited, connected to the country only via the Hollyford Track, a popular tramping route. In the early days of European settlement, it was planned to be the harbour for a town, Jamestown, located immediately inland on the shores of Lake McKerrow.

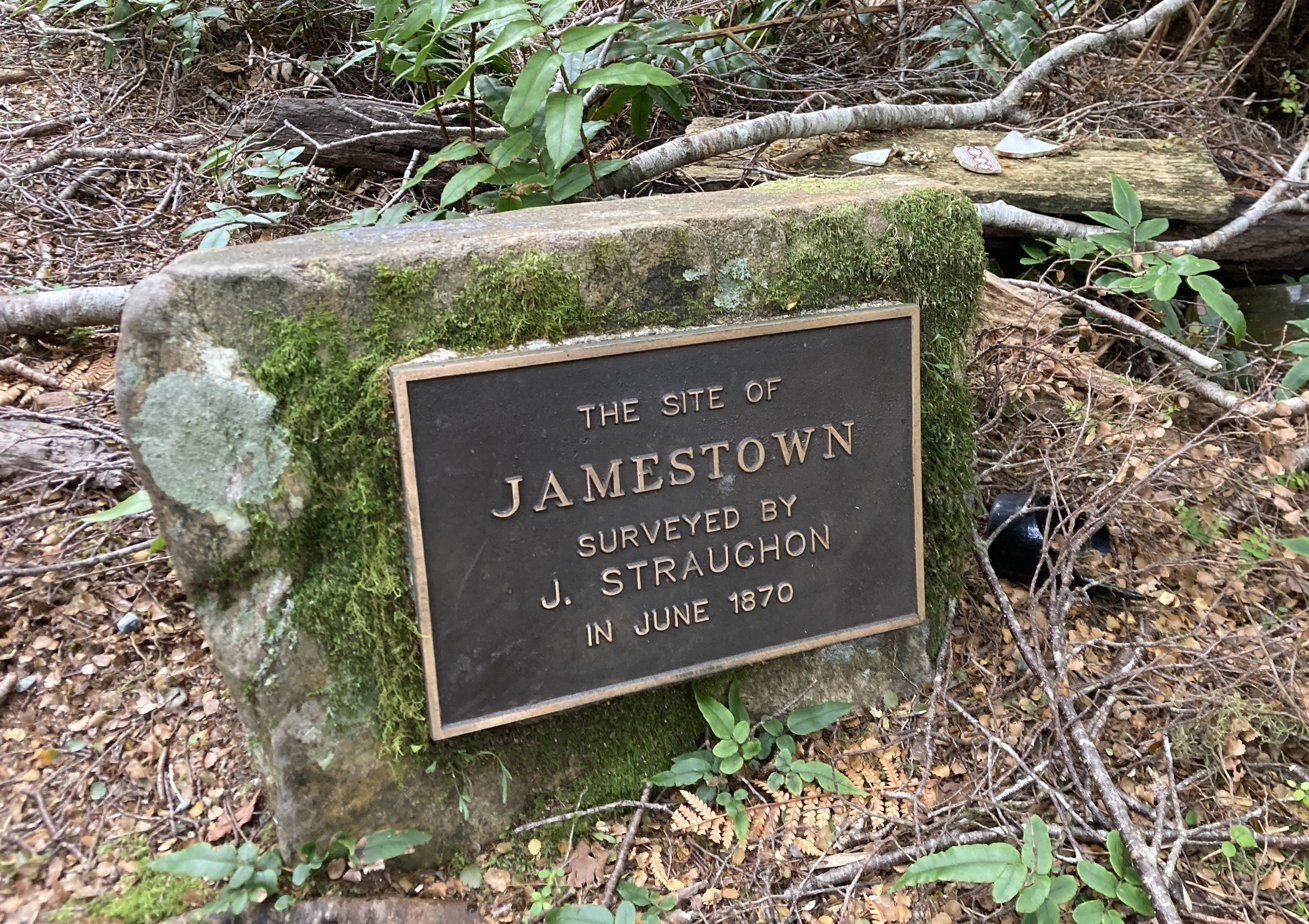
The site of Jamestown.

Jamestown was founded in 1870, after James Hector claimed that a road could follow the route he took in 1863, but the terrain, weather, and difficulty of getting supplies to the township caused the project to fail. The ship that dropped off the first settlers foundered as it left the bay; their first baby born there was the daughter of passengers who intended to go on to Greymouth.

Jamestown was named after its sponsor, James Macandrew.

By 1872, the 35 remaining settlers were nearly destitute and were grubbing for roots for food. By 1873, only five families were maintaining houses or gardens, and the promised overland route back to Lake Wakatipu had not been established.

The settlement was deserted by 1879. Today, little trace remains of either Jamestown or the port.

Those pioneering days were the subject of Alice Mackenzie's book The Pioneers of Martins Bay, which recounted her childhood as a settler at Jamestown and Martins Bay. She lived there until 1902; her brothers were the last settlers to remain, until 1926.

The origin of the bay's name is uncertain, though it may have been the name of one of the surveyors who mapped the area in the 1870s, or of the captain of a sealing vessel.

"The wonder is, not that so many settlers left the bay, but that anyone stayed there at all".
