= 1975 New Zealand bravery awards =

The 1975 New Zealand bravery awards were announced via a Special Honours List dated 27 June 1975, and recognised three people for acts of bravery earlier that year.

== George Medal (GM) ==
- Robert Donald Spary – of Cromwell; pilot and managing director of Alpine Helicopters Ltd., Queenstown.

On 2 January 1975 Robert Donald Spary was asked by the Police to give assistance to a party of climbers in the Olivine Mountain Range to the northwest of Queenstown. The party had radioed that one of their members had fallen some 40 feet down the Olivine Falls into the Olivine River and was lying badly injured on a rock ledge. Because of the rugged terrain, assistance was required to move him from the area for hospital treatment. There was no suitable area for winged aircraft or a helicopter to land and to have moved the injured climber to a landing site would have

taken two days on foot. Mr Spary, with a doctor, flew into the area to ascertain the nature of the injuries and how best to move the injured man. On arrival it was found difficult to get to him and it was decided to lift two climbers from Pyke Hut and place them on a large flat rock at the base of the Falls near where the injured man lay, with a view to moving him to the rock for a pick up. However, the two climbers were unable to get to the injured man and were returned to Pyke Hut. With the weather closing in and little prospect of completing the rescue by other means, Mr Spary then decided he would attempt to land on the rock ledge where the injured man lay. He did this by placing one skid of the helicopter on the ledge, balancing the machine under a wall of water from the Falls, and with the rotor blades almost touching a sheer rock face. While in this precarious and extremely dangerous position, the injured man managed to crawl into the helicopter and was taken to hospital. Another member of the party with a badly sprained ankle was also lifted out of the area at the same time.

The whole rescue operation took two and a half hours and was carried out in extremely hazardous and demanding conditions. It owed its success almost entirely to the great courage, dedication, and outstanding flying skill of Mr Spary.

== Queen's Commendation for Brave Conduct ==
- Selwyn James Barron – of Waipukurau.

For rescuing two injured youths from a motor vehicle which had run off the road and burst into flames. Had it not been for his quick action, there is every likelihood that both occupants would have died. In the course of the rescue he received superficial burns to his hands and face.

== Queen's Commendation for Valuable Service in the Air ==
- Samuel Duncan Bunting Anderson – pilot, James Aviation Ltd., Helicopter Division, Auckland.

For services rendered in the fighting of a large bush fire at Piha on 6 and 7 February 1975. It was largely due to his outstanding skill as a helicopter pilot and unremitting efforts with a monsoon bucket that the fire was contained and many houses and baches in the area saved from destruction.
