= Olivine River =

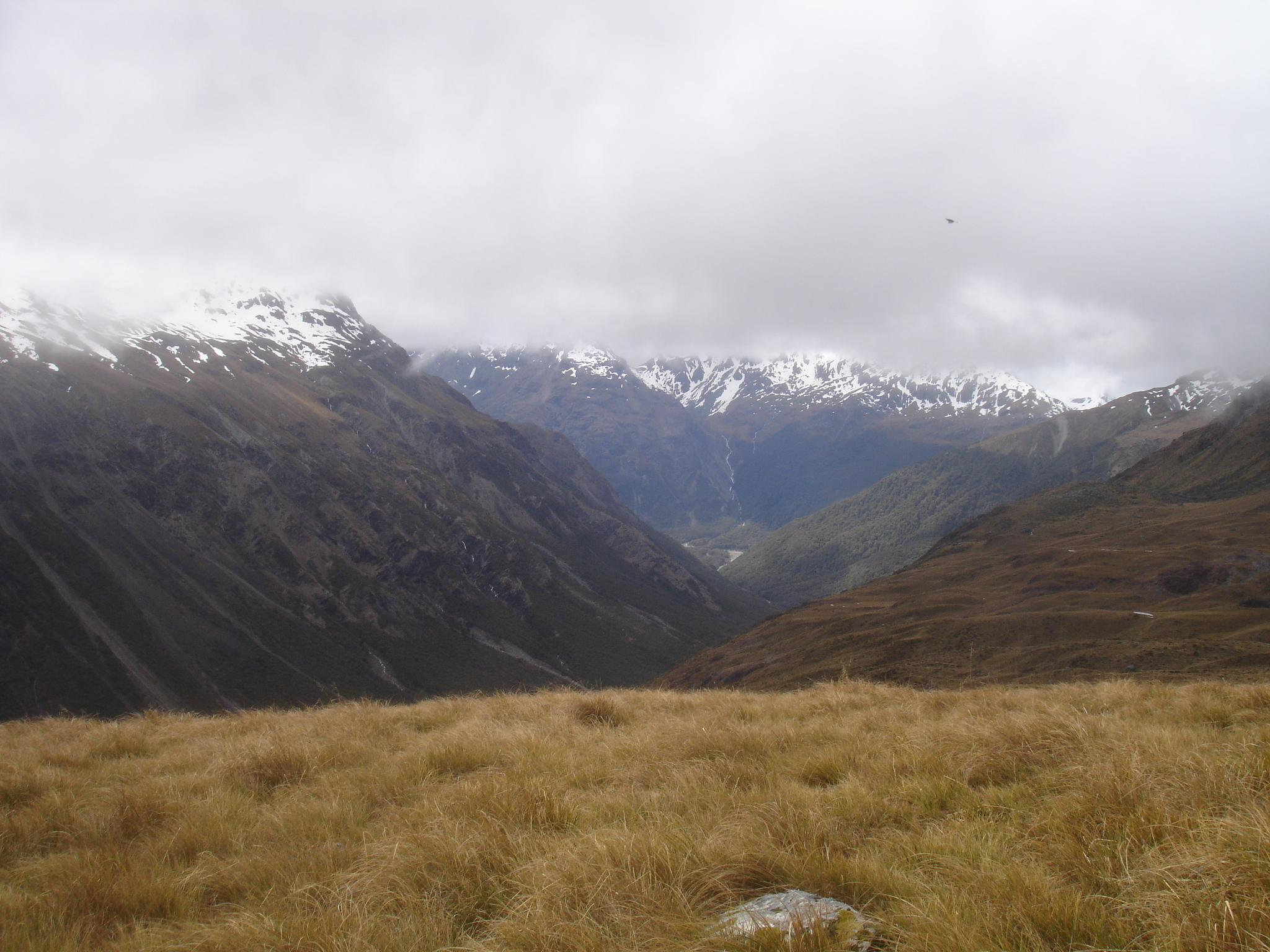
- Route of the Olivine River
- Mouth of the Olivine River Olivine River (South Island) Olivine River (New Zealand)
- Native name: Te Motutūroro

Location
- Country: New Zealand

Physical characteristics
- Source: Cow Saddle
  - coordinates: 44°32′19″S 168°12′15″E
- Mouth
  - location: Pyke River
  - coordinates: 44°26′37″S 168°12′48″E

Basin features
- Progression: Olivine River → Pyke River → Hollyford River / Whakatipu Kā Tuka → Tasman Sea
- Tributaries
  - left: Fiery Creek
  - right: Forgotten River

The Olivine River (Te Motutūroro) is a river in northern Fiordland, New Zealand, located in Mount Aspiring National Park. It rises north of the Cow Saddle and flows north, then north-west over Olivine Falls to become a tributary of the Pyke River near Olivine Hut. The Five Passes hiking (tramping) trail passes through the upper river near Cow Saddle. The Dun Mountain Ophiolite Belt which is rich in the mineral olivine outcrops extensively in the Olivine River and its tributaries.

== See also ==
- List of rivers of New Zealand
