= Te Wahipounamu =

Te Wahipounamu – South West New Zealand
UNESCO World Heritage Site
- Interactive map of Te Wahipounamu – South West New Zealand
- Location: South Island, New Zealand
- Criteria: Natural: vii, viii, ix, x
- Reference: 551
- Inscription: 1990 (14th Session)
- Area: 2,600,000 ha (6,400,000 acres)
- Coordinates: 45°02′10″S 167°19′12″E

Te Wāhipounamu (Māori for "the place of greenstone") is a World Heritage Site in the south west corner of the South Island of New Zealand.

Inscribed on the World Heritage List in 1990 and covering 26,000 square kilometres (10,000 sq mi), the site incorporates four national parks:

- Aoraki / Mount Cook
- Fiordland
- Mount Aspiring
- Westland Tai Poutini

It is thought to contain some of the best modern representations of the original flora and fauna of Gondwana, one of the reasons for its listing as a World Heritage site.

== Description ==
Te Wahipounamu stretches 450 kilometres (280 mi) along the western coastline of the South Island of New Zealand. The elevation of this land area ranges from sea level to 3,724 metres (12,218 ft) at Aoraki / Mount Cook. In some places it extends inland as far as 90 kilometres (56 mi). Within Te Wahipounamu there is a multitude of natural features including snow-capped peaks, sapphire lakes, waterfalls, fiords, and valleys. It is also home to hundreds of the world's most active glaciers, but the main two are Franz Josef Glacier and Fox Glacier. It is the largest and least modified area of New Zealand's natural ecosystem. And as such, the flora and fauna of the area is the world's best modern representation of the ancient biota of Gondwanaland.

=== Flora ===
The vegetation in Te Wahipounamu is diverse and in essentially pristine condition. On the mountains there is a rich alpine vegetation of shrubs, tussocks and herbs. The warmer and lower altitude rainforests are dominated by tall podocarps. There are more rainforests and wetlands in the west, and the most extensive and least modified natural freshwater wetlands in New Zealand are found in this area. The Westland coastal plain is characterised by its high-fertility swamps and low-fertility peat bogs.

=== Fauna ===
Te Wahipounamu is home to many indigenous animals and contains the largest and most significant population of forest birds in the country. The total wild population of the takahē, which is only about 170 birds, is found in a few mountain valleys in Fiordland. Along the south-west coast, most of New Zealand's Fur Seals are found. Also found in this region are Southern brown kiwi, great spotted kiwi, yellow-crowned parakeet, Fiordland penguin, New Zealand falcon, and brown teal. The kākāpō, the world's rarest and heaviest parrot, was found in this region until the early 1980s.

=== Population ===
The Te Wahipounamu area is the least populated part of New Zealand. Most residents work in tourism related jobs but there are other land use occupations. On the coast residents engage in fishing, grazing, and small-scale mining. In the eastern part of the World Heritage area pastoralism is the main land use. Sheep and cattle grazing is permitted under license or lease, although designation of Te Wahipounamu as a World Heritage site has limited the lands available for these practices.

=== Land formations ===
Te Wahipounamu is one of the most seismically active regions in the world. It lies across the boundary of two plates, the Pacific Plate and the Indo-Australian Plate. The mountains in the area are a result of tectonic movements over the last five million years. Glaciers are also a major feature of the area. Their basic pattern was set during the Pleistocene glaciations although there have been substantial post-glacial changes. These changes are greater in the Southern Alps than in the Fiordlands. Typical changes include intense gullying, serrated ridges, and major and minor rockfalls. Landslides, although not frequent, are a potential hazard of the region. Even with the low density of settlements and transport corridors, there is the potential occurrence of landslides in the vicinity of tourist infrastructure in the Southern Alps.

== Māori connections to the land ==
The entire region of Te Wahipounamu is of deep significance to Māori, in particular the Ngāi Tahu iwi, whose rohe (traditional area of control) covers the majority of the South Island.

The area was, and continues to be, an important source of pounamu greenstone or jade. This precious stone is used for making Maori tools, weapons, and jewelry.

=== Legend ===
The legend as to the formation of this region and the South Island is as follows. Te Wahipounamu was formed when the four sons of Rakinui, the Sky Father, descended from the heavens and set out on a voyage around Papatūānuku, the Earth Mother. During this voyage their canoe hit a reef and the brothers found themselves stranded. An icy wind from the Tasman Sea froze them into stone and their canoe became the South Island of New Zealand. The tallest of the brothers was Aoraki and he is now Aoraki Mt. Cook while his brothers and the other crewmembers form the rest of the Southern Alps.

The Māori also have a legend for the formation of Franz Josef and Fox Glaciers. This legend begins with Hinehukatere who loved climbing in the mountains. One day she persuaded her lover, Tawe, to join her. An avalanche killed Tawe and he came to rest in Fox Glacier. The traditional Māori name for the glacier is Te Moeke o Tauwe, which means the bed of Tauwe. After Tauwe's death, Hinehukatere was heartbroken and cried so many tears. These tears froze to form Franz Josef Glacier. The Maori name for Franz Josef Glacier is Ka Roimata o Hinehukatere which means the tears of Hinehukatere.

== UNESCO World Heritage Site ==
Te Wahipounamu was added to the UNESCO World Heritage List in 1990. The Westland and Mount Cook National Park and the Fiordland National Park were previously inscribed on the list, but are now considered under Te Wahipounamu, which covers all of these areas. To be inscribed on this list, Te Wahipounamu met several criteria. It contains many of the natural features that contribute to New Zealand's reputation as a place with exceptional landscapes. It is considered the best modern example of the biota of Gondwanaland and is therefore of global significance. There is a high degree of geodiversity and biodiversity and the habitats are largely unmodified. And finally, there is an extensive range of New Zealand's unusual flora and fauna, which demonstrate its evolutionary isolation.

== Protection and management ==
=== Legal requirements ===
Most of the land in Te Wahipounamu is owned by the Crown (government and the people of New Zealand) and administered by the Department of Conservation. The most important regulations are the National Parks Act 1980, the Conservation Act 1987, and Reserves Act 1977, which were not made specifically for Te Wahipounamu but apply as they are for all of New Zealand. There is a legislative mandate for the preservation and protection of natural and historic resources to maintain their intrinsic value, provide for their appreciation and recreational enjoyment by the public, and safeguard options of future generations.

=== Treaty of Waitangi ===
The Treaty of Waitangi grants the Ngāi Tahu people prestige and authority over the land. The Department of Conservation is obligated to oblige to the principles of this treaty. This implies a partnership agreement with the Ngāi Tahu people. This partnership involves an annual business planning process with the Ngāi Tahu iwi (the overarching tribal authority), which gives the Ngāi Tahu an opportunity to engage in and contribute to the operational management of the property.

The treaty was not always honoured though, but a settlement was made around the time Te Wahipounamu was declared a World Heritage Area. The implications of this settlement were threefold. First Mount Cook became Aoraki / Mount Cook and 88 other topographic features were agreed to have dual Māori/English names. Secondly, the title for Aoraki was returned to the Ngāi Tahu Tribe who then in turn gifted it to the people of New Zealand. And finally the Tribe was given rights of access and temporary occupancy for the gathering of traditional foods and materials.

=== Management planning framework ===
There are four main planning entities for developing the management framework for the wilderness resources of the Te Wahipounamu World Heritage Area. The first entity is legislation. New Zealand does not have any legislation specific to the World Heritage Site and therefore Te Wahipounamu is managed under the previously mentioned legislation (National Parks Act, Conservation Act, Reserves Act). The second entity is visitor strategy. The Department of Conservation manages all sites within Te Wahipounamu under the Visitor Strategy. This strategy divides visitors into seven groups based on the length of their stay and the type of activities they seek. It then provides quality recreational opportunities for these groups and facilities when appropriate. The third entity is conservation management strategies. These are documents stating regional conservation and they outline strategic priorities and key sites for biodiversity conservation and visitor recreation. The final planning entity is management plans. Management plans are created for specific sites within Te Wahipounamu. Each National Park has its own management plan.

== Tourism ==
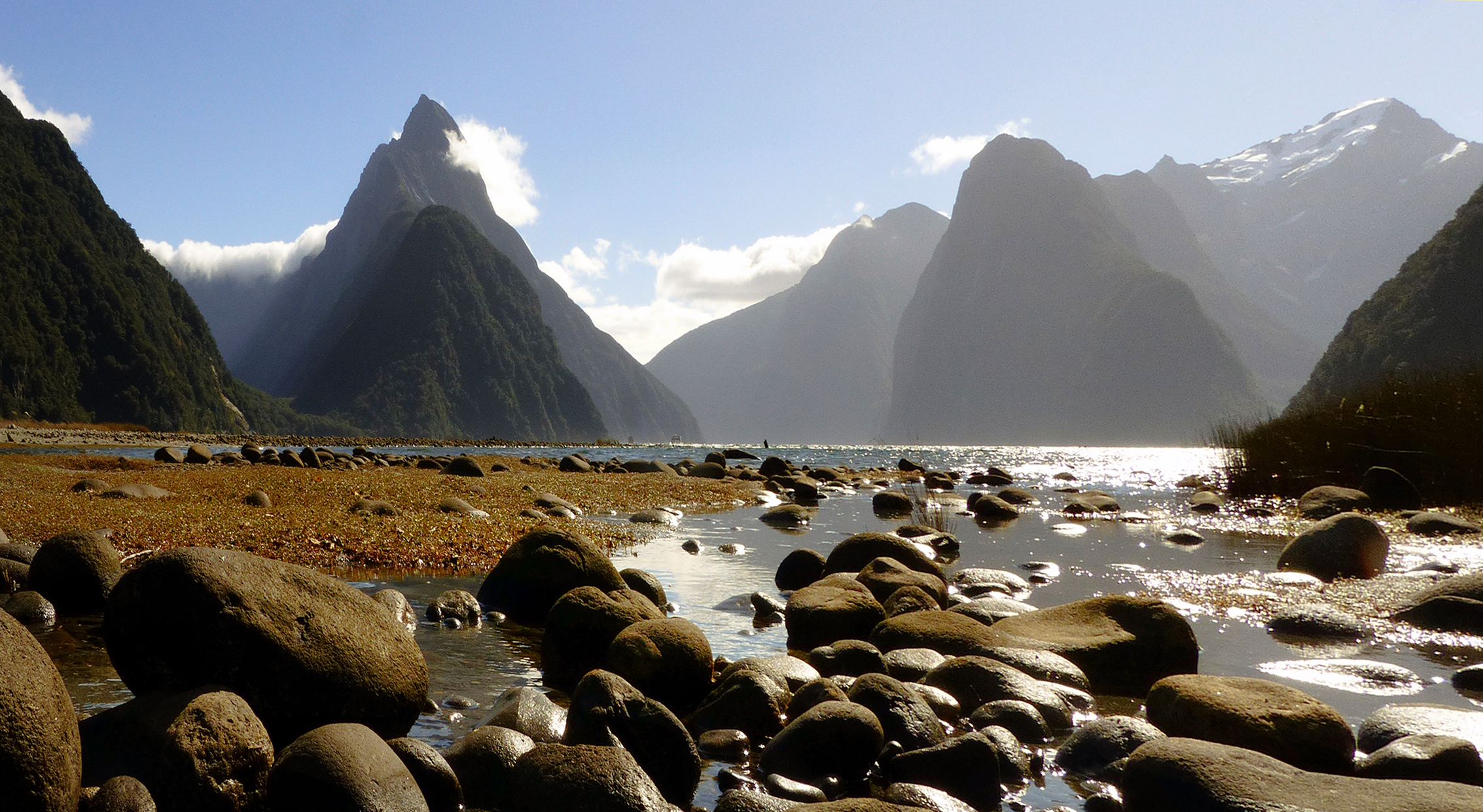
Milford Sound

The main tourist attractions within Te Wahipounamu are Milford Sound / Piopiotahi and the Milford Track, Lake Te Anau and the Kepler Track, the Routeburn Track and Mount Aspiring / Tititea, Aoraki / Mount Cook and the Haupapa / Tasman, Franz Josef, and Fox Glaciers. There are only two main roads in the region, the Haast Highway and Milford Highway. Along these highways, which are referred to as the “Heritage Highway” corridors, is a network of ten visitor centres and a multitude of nature walks. A main attraction to Te Wahipounamu, and New Zealand in general, is the natural landscape. A study found that key motivating factors for visitors to Te Wahipounamu are the scenery and recreational activities. Tourism within Te Wahipounamu is nature-based, ‘green’ tourism. There is a combination of nature and adventure tourism. There are some strictly nature based tourism activities such as walking in the Natural Parks, whale-watching, and boat tours in the Fiordland Sounds. Then there are activities such as tramping or trekking, which contain adventure components like crossing rivers or mountain passes while enjoying the natural scenery. Even the adventure activities like glacier walks, rafting, and climbing take place in the natural environment.

According to Charnley, this type of nature tourism may not qualify as ecotourism. In her definition of ecotourism, it must have genuine social benefits and serve as a tool for sustainable community development. This requires meeting three conditions. Economic benefits must be structured in a culturally appropriate way that makes them accessible to the target population. For communities to benefit, they need secure land tenure over the area as well as the ability to make land use decisions. And the tourism benefits have to be more than economic, they must promote deeper social and political justice goals. The communities in Te Wahipounamu survive mainly through tourism. Most residents of the region are there because of the tourism employment opportunities. Thus the economic benefits are prevalent, but in most cases there lacks a further cultural or conservational component. Although there are some more historically and culturally based tourism activities and tours available. There is cultural integration among visitors and locals due to the small scale of the facilities but there is less often a link to traditional Maori culture. Conservational efforts are in place in this entire region but they are a result of governmental beliefs and World Heritage designation, they are not a result of the tool of ecotourism. So many people may refer to ecotourism in Te Wahipounamu but whether it truly deserves that title is open to interpretation.

The area is a destination for large cruise ships which do not dock and smaller cruise ships that run local itineraries.

=== Wilderness ===
Within Te Wahipounamu there are four wilderness areas. These areas are Hooker-Landsborough, which covers 41,000 ha, Olivine (80,000 ha), Pembroke (18,000 ha) and Glaisnock (125,000 ha). Together these wilderness areas make up 10% of the total area of Te Wahipounamu. They are managed strictly in terms of the New Zealand Wilderness Policy. This policy defines wilderness areas as “wildlands that appear to have been affected only by the forces of nature, with any imprint of human interference substantially unnoticeable. Designated wilderness areas are managed to perpetuate their natural condition.” There are no visitor facilities in these areas. No roads, huts, bridges, or even tracks. And there is no air access for recreational or commercial purposes. Visitors enter these areas “on nature's terms”.

The wilderness areas perpetuate ideas of purity and nature that have long existed. John Muir and Aldo Leopold advocated for the protection of the American wilderness and wilderness ideas were one of the foundations for the environmental movement in the United States. The New Zealand Wilderness Policy mirrors these ideas with criteria about having this protected land for enjoyment but keeping it virtually untouched by humans. The continuing rise in tourism to New Zealand is affecting this experience though. There are perceptions of crowding on several of the backcountry tramping tracks. This effects and minimizes the desired experience of wilderness and solitude.

== Mining ==
In 2026, the Minister for Resources Shane Jones granted a prospecting permit in Te Wāhipounamu, despite John Key having ruled out mining in 2012. The permit is for an area of 157 km^{2} and covers the prospecting of any mineral except uranium. Green Party resources spokesperson Steve Abel called the issuing of the permit "utterly unacceptable", pointing out that the world heritage areas are irreplaceable, and that mining would likely result in permanent damage to the area.

== Miscellaneous issues ==
There are a variety of issues throughout Te Wahipounamu that still need resolution. They include the following:

The environmental threat of a Haast-Hollyford road, a proposal that has been suggested since the 1870s.

There is a further need to forge a working partnership with the Ngāi Tahu iwi. In principle there is a framework for this partnership but it is a persistent issue to realise the theoretical framework and implement a true partnership.

Due to tourism there is an increase in tourist aircraft. The noise pollution from these aircraft disrupts the “natural quiet” of this region, which many wish to preserve.

Currently the World Heritage Area does not include a marine component. There is a perceived need for better protection of the coastal wilderness.

One of the larger issues the region faces are populations of invasive species. Invasive species have the biggest impact on the region. Population increases of red deer, and other browsing mammals such as wapiti, goat, and fallow deer, have caused severe damage and particularly threaten the integrity of the forest and alpine ecosystems. Commercial hunting has been used as a means of reducing these populations to ecologically acceptable levels. The Department of Conservation has control programs and the National Parks policy is to eradicate new invasions and eradicate or reduce the range of existing invasive species.
