= Hollyford Track =

Tramping track in New Zealand

Coordinates: 44.6928°S 168.1258°E

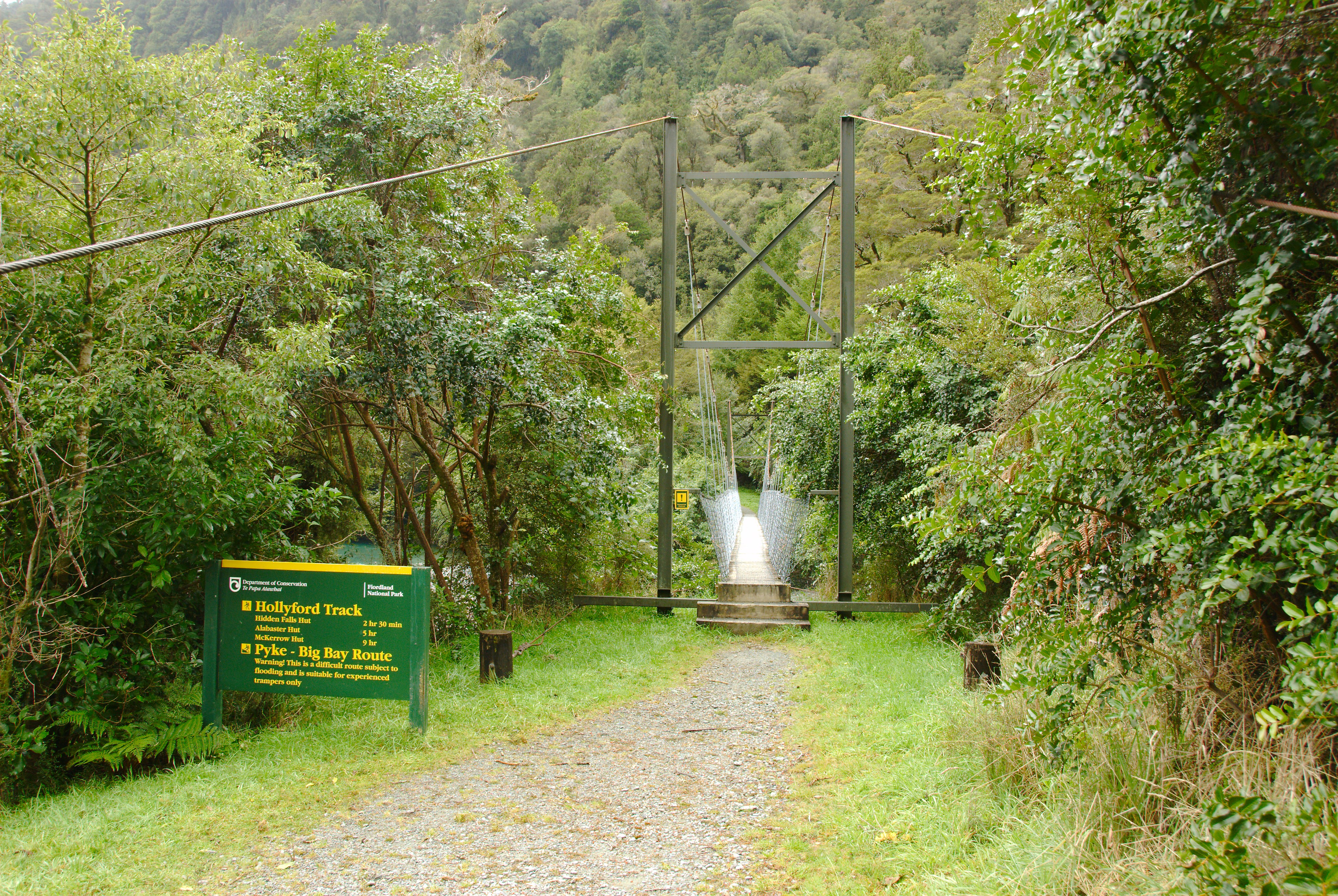
The start of the track at the Hollyford River.

The Hollyford Track is a tramping track in New Zealand. Located at the northern edge of Fiordland, in the southwestern South Island, it is unusual among Fiordland's major tracks in that it is largely flat and accessible year-round. It follows the Hollyford River which in turn follows the course of the Hollyford Valley.

== History ==
The Māori people were the first to settle the area around Martins Bay, though by the time of the arrival of Europeans in the mid-19th century, only a handful remained in the area. One of these was Tūtoko, for whom Mount Tūtoko, which rises 2700m above the Hollyford valley, was subsequently named.

he first Europeans to reach the bay via an inland route was Patrick Caples from Hollyford, County Tipperary, Ireland, in 1863, although early runholders David McKellar and George Gunn had mapped some of the valley two years previously. Also in 1863, a small ship captained by a Captain Alabaster crossed the sandbar at Martins Bay to reach Lake McKerrow.

In the early days of European settlement, there was much enthusiasm for a commercial port at Martins Bay, led by the Otago Provincial Council. A settlement – Jamestown – was surveyed and several houses built, but the lack of road links to the rest of the province and the dangerous sandbar led to the gradual waning of the settlement, which was practically deserted by 1879, only some eleven years after its founding. Only one family, the McKenzies, remained close to Martins Bay. They sold their property to Davy Gunn in 1926. Gunn continued to farm the area, and also mapped the area and was a pioneer in the tramping tourism industry, taking parties of walkers along the valleys of the Hollyford, Pyke and Cascade Rivers. After his death in 1955, his son Murray continued to guide trampers in the area, and started "Gunn's Camp", a rest-stop for trampers with store and small museum, which still stands near the southern end of the track, around 10 km from the Milford Sound-Te Anau highway.

The gravel road was being constructed up until 1941 when the workers were taken off the job for the war effort and was worked on both ends. After World War II the idea of a road linking Haast to Hollyford was reignited to allow access and used prison and unemployed labor to progress the work. In 1960, the valley became part of Fiordland National Park and Davy Gunn's original tracks have since been upgraded and tramping huts established.

== The track ==
The track is 56 kilometres (35 mi) in length. It runs in a roughly south–north direction, its southern end being accessible by road 15 kilometres to the east of the Homer Tunnel, and its northern end being at the Tasman Sea coast at Martins Bay, north of Milford Sound.

For most of its path, the track follows the course of the Hollyford River / Hollyford Valley. Features of the track are the two lakes, Lake Alabaster (or Waiwahuika) and Lake McKerrow (or Whakatipu Waitai), the latter being a fiord now cut off from the sea by sediment. The track runs through lowland forest, with views of surrounding mountains. Wildlife visible from the track include seals, penguins, and herons.

The track is part of the Department of Conservation network with several bunk huts scattered along its length. It also has a guided operation operated by Ngai Tahu Tourism (owned by the main South Island Maori tribal group) with their own Lodges at Pyke and Martins Bay. The guided option combines hiking, jetboating and helicopter flights in a three-day journey from the mountains to the sea. Freedom walkers can make the walk more accessible by flying into or out of Martins Bay. Walkers are advised to be aware that the 2–3 day section from the Pyke River to Martins Bay alongside Lake McKerrow is well known as the 'Demon Trail'. This due to its uneven nature with multiple side streams. The Demon trail is aptly named and can be slippery in the wet.

== Road proposals ==
There have been a number of proposals for a road in the vicinity of the track to link Haast with the Milford Sound road, proposed as early as the 1870s.

In 2001 a widely distributed newspaper advertising supplement "The South Island Loop" promoted the Hollyford road as well as a road in the vicinity of the Heaphy Track. Mayors in the South Island and other supporters pushed for having the road built. Forest and Bird, New Zealand's largest conservation organisation, called it the "biological equivalent of smashing the Mona Lisa". In January 2010, the National-led government confirmed that it was considering a Hollyford road proposal. The Westland District Council and the owner of a hotel chain are backing plans for the road. The plans were however put on hold in March 2010, when government decided that the investment was a low priority.

== See also ==
- Tramping in New Zealand
- New Zealand tramping tracks
