= Pyke River =

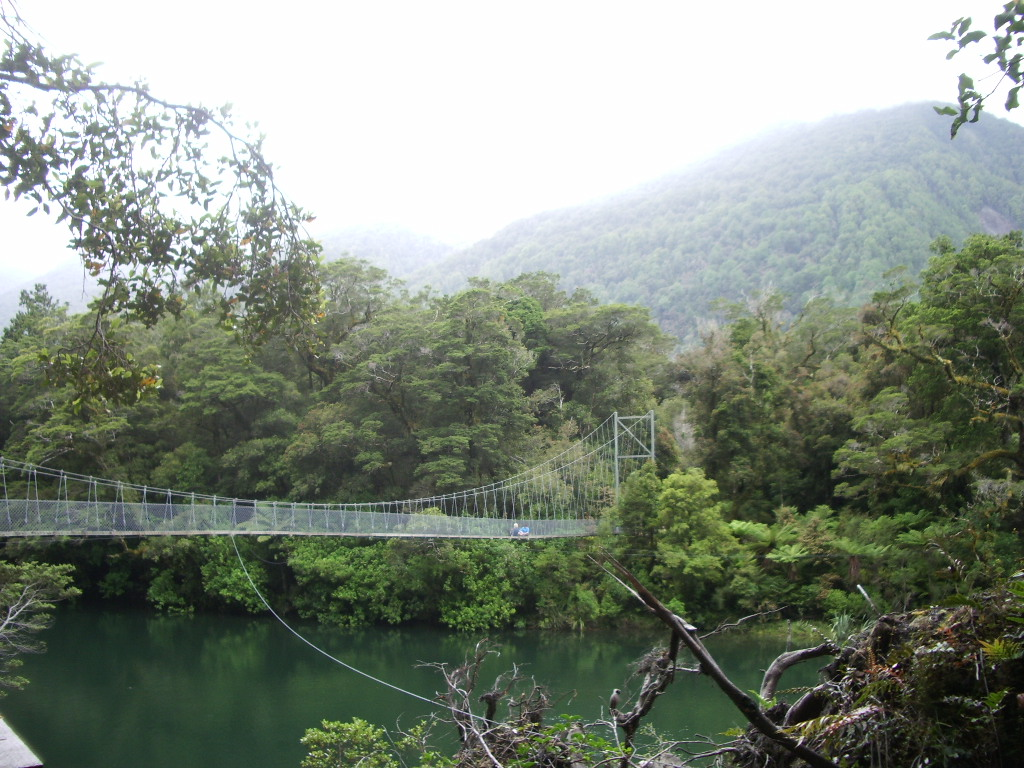
- Swing bridge over the Pyke River on the Hollyford Track
- Route of Pyke River
- Mouth of Pyke River Pyke River (South Island) Pyke River (New Zealand)
- Native name: Kaoreore (Māori)

Location
- Country: New Zealand
- Region: Southland
- District: Southland

Physical characteristics
- Source: Confluence of the Sealy Stream and Trinity Creek
  - coordinates: 44°21′20″S 168°19′32″E
- Mouth
  - location: Hollyford River / Whakatipu Kā Tuka
  - coordinates: 44°33′25″S 168°07′37″E
  - elevation: 13 metres (43 ft)

Basin features
- Progression: Pyke River → Hollyford River / Whakatipu Kā Tuka → Tasman Sea
- Tributaries
  - left: Rata Creek, Peanut Stream, Barrier River, Diorite Stream, Olivine River, Powell Creek, Chair Creek
  - right: Simonin Stream, Red Pyke River, Durwards Creek, Paulin Creek, Wilmot River, Cloud Creek
- Waterbodies: Lake Wilmot, Lake Alabaster

The Pyke River is a river in the south west of New Zealand's South Island. It flows generally south into Lake Wilmot then Lake Alabaster, before becoming a tributary of the Hollyford River.

The Pyke River begins at the confluence of the Sealy Stream and Trinity Creek in Mount Aspiring National Park, forming much of the park's western border in Southland District. The Pyke River begins to flow through Fiordland National Park after meeting the Olivine River.

== Gallery ==
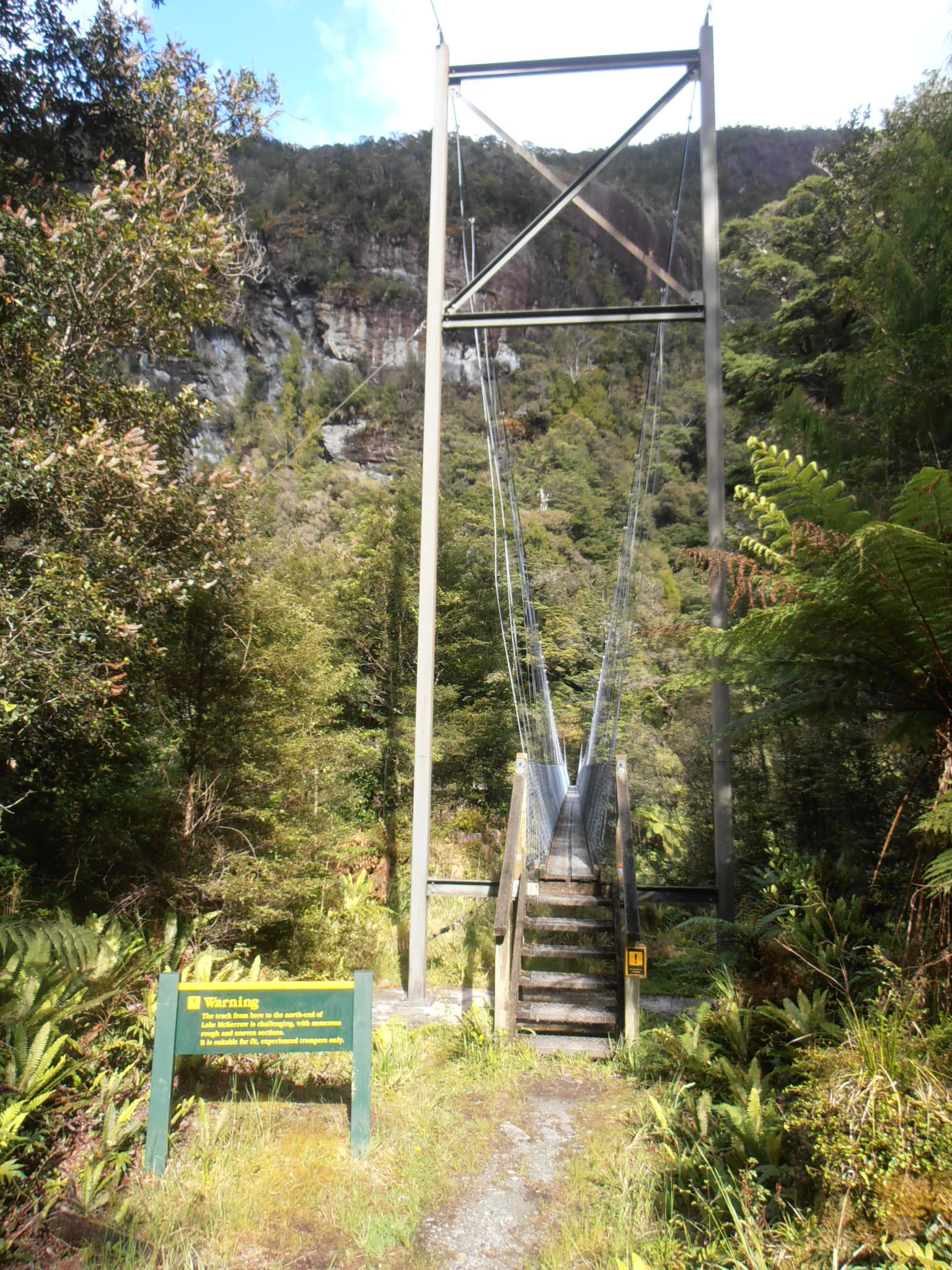
The Demon Trail, a section of the Hollyford Track, involves a swing bridge crossing of the Pyke River.

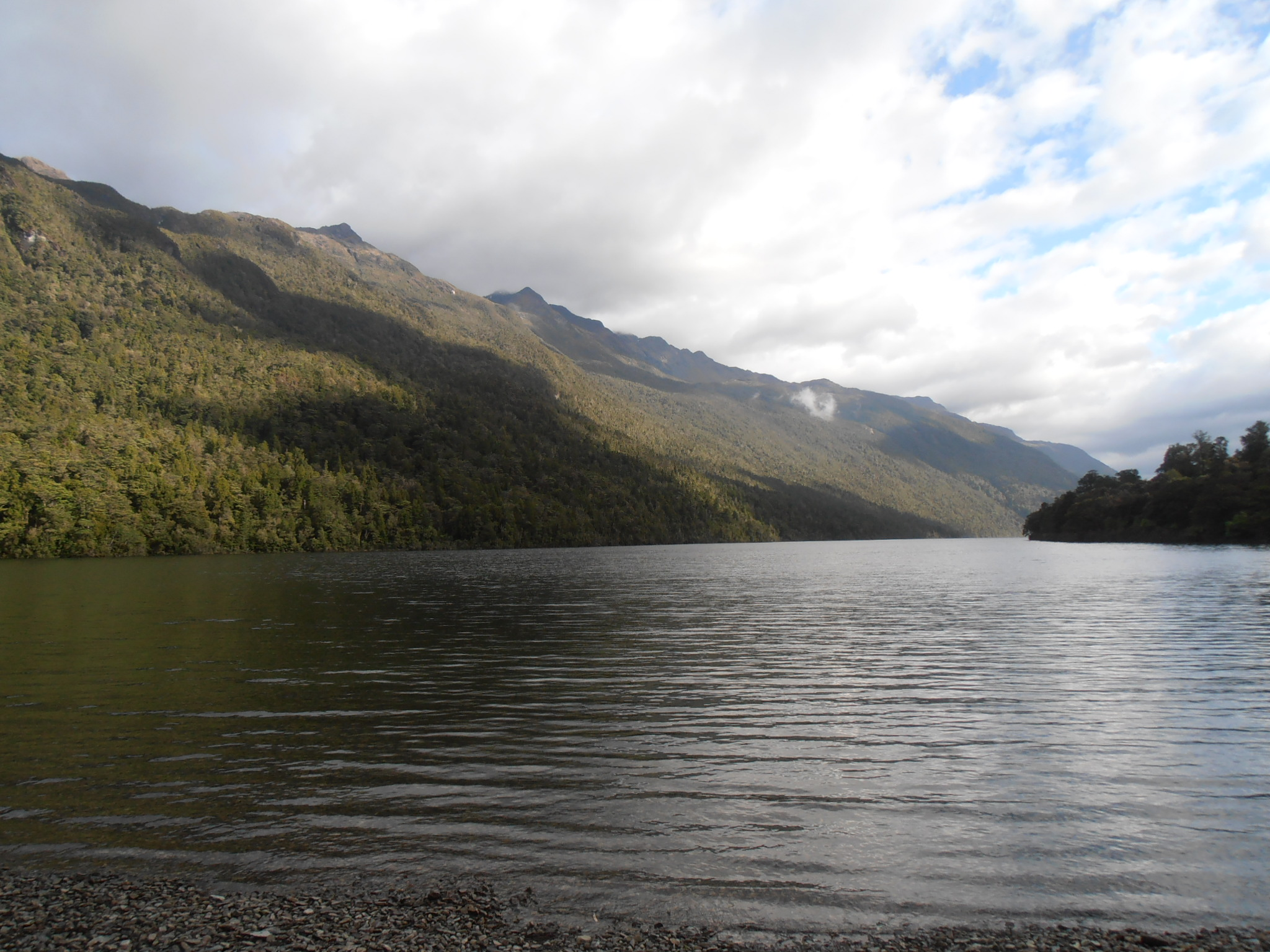
Lake Alabaster is a prominent lake fed by the Pyke River.

== See also ==
- List of rivers of New Zealand
