= Lake McKerrow =

Lake in New Zealand

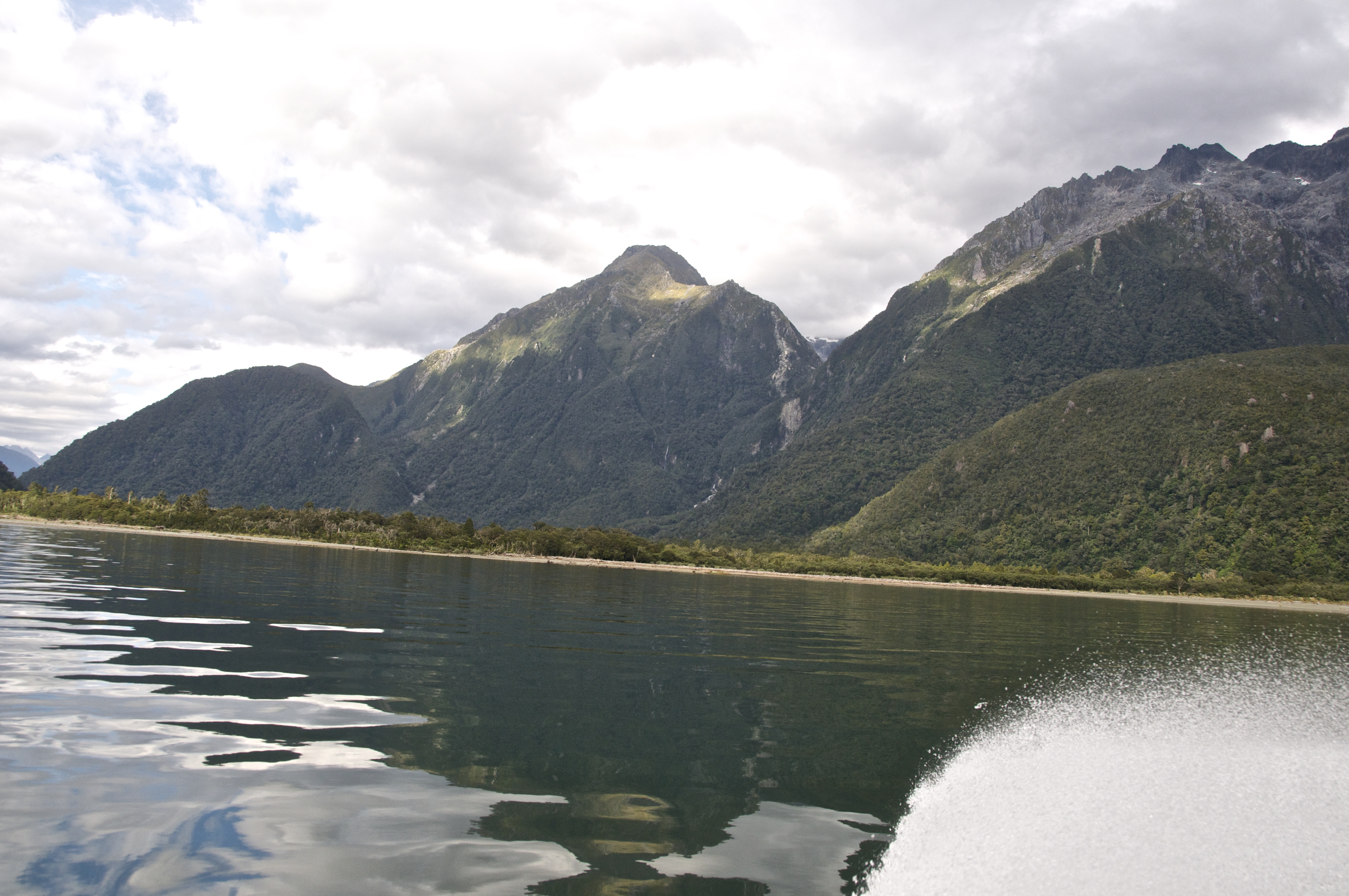
- Jetboat ride along Lake McKerrow

- Location within South Island
- Interactive map of Lake McKerrow
- Location: Fiordland, South Island, New Zealand
- Coordinates: 44°26′S 168°03′E
- Type: fault lake, fiord lake and meromictic lake
- Primary inflows: Hollyford River / Whakatipu Kā Tuka
- Primary outflows: Hollyford River / Whakatipu Kā Tuka
- Basin countries: New Zealand
- Max. length: 15 km (9.3 mi)
- Surface area: 28 km^{2} (11 sq mi)
- Max. depth: 109 m (358 ft)
- Surface elevation: 1 m (3.3 ft)

Lake McKerrow (officially Lake McKerrow / Whakatipu Waitai) lies at the northern end of Fiordland, in the southwest of New Zealand's South Island. The lake runs from southeast to northwest, is 15 kilometres (9 mi) in length, and covers 28 km^{2} (11 sq mi).

Lake McKerrow drains, and is drained by, the Hollyford River. It is one of two lakes (along with Lake Alabaster) found in the lower reaches of the Hollyford River system, and the Hollyford Track, one of New Zealand's most well-known and popular tramping tracks, follows its eastern shore for its full length.

The lake is technically a fiord which has been cut off from the Tasman Sea by sediment. The sea is now three kilometres from the lake's northern end.

The Alpine Fault goes through the lake. Researchers from GNS Science and University of Nevada, Reno have studied sediments from the 24 last Alpine Fault earthquakes near the lake and have found the most regular rupture behaviour yet observed.

Following the passage of the Ngāi Tahu Claims Settlement Act 1998, the lake became one of roughly 90 places in the South Island to be officially given a dual name, adopting the name Lake McKerrow / Whakatipu Waitai.
