= Hollyford Valley =

Valley in Southland Region, New Zealand

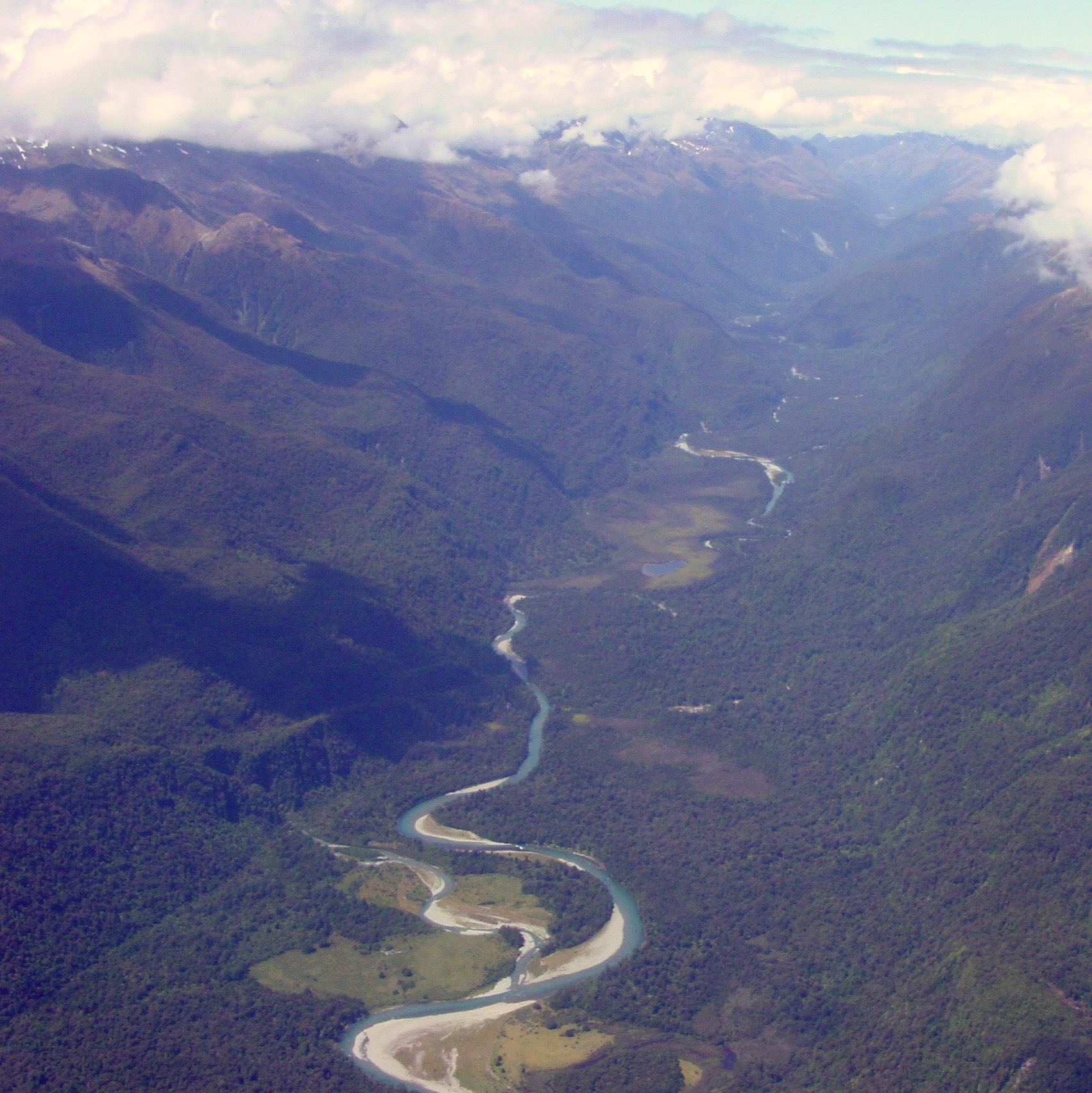

Geography
- Country: New Zealand
- State/Province: Fiordland
- Coordinates: 44.727223°S 168.129272°E
- River: Hollyford River
- Interactive map of Hollyford Valley

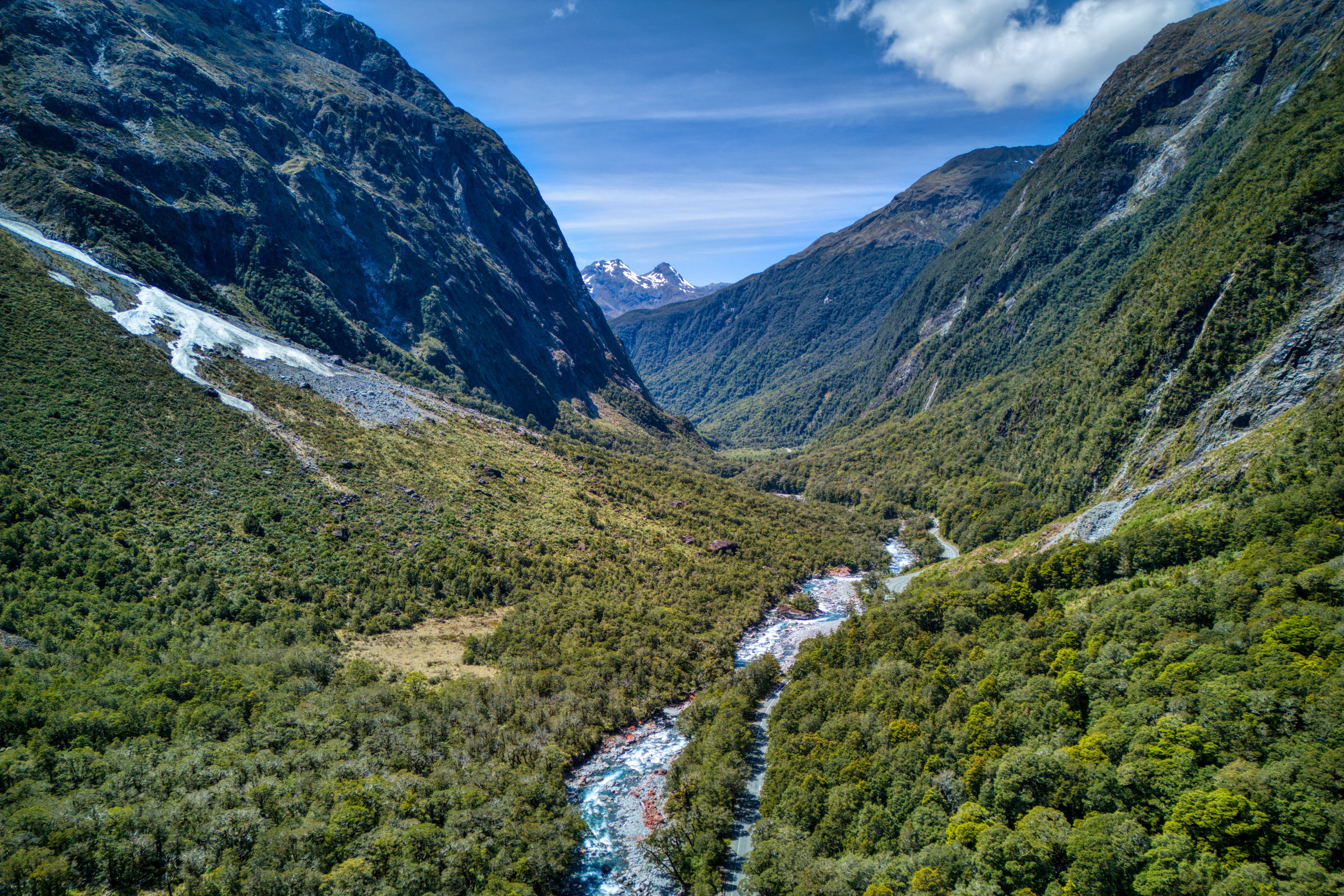
Hollyford Valley and River

Hollyford Valley is a valley in Fiordland, New Zealand, in the southwest of the South Island. It is named for the Hollyford River, which runs north-north-west along its length from the Southern Alps to the Tasman Sea. Beech forest dominates both the slopes and the bottom of the valley.

Historically very remote, there is still only one road into the valley, Milford Road, which approaches the valley from the south from Te Anau, but turns towards Homer's Saddle into Milford Sound long before reaching the coast. The turnoff site, a former roadworkers camp, sports a small museum and is a starting point for a number of tramping (hiking) routes, with about 2,000 people per year exploring the Hollyford Valley backcountry.

== Hollyford River ==
The Hollyford River drains the valley to Martins Bay on the Tasman Sea.

== Hollyford Track ==
The Hollyford Track gives tourist access to the valley.

== Davey Gunn ==
From 1936 the attractions of the Hollyford Valley were promoted by local farmer and resident, David Gunn.

== Haast-Hollyford road ==
In 2010, plans resurfaced to construct a road from this turnoff towards Haast, following first the river and then travelling along the rugged coastline. Such a road had previously been mooted as far back as the 1870s, but had always been considered too costly, and the benefits too remote. However, a privately funded report estimates that a toll road could be built for between $225–315 million. The proponents claim that the road should have "Road of National Significance" status, as it would be useful for tourism in the area, and could reduce the time it takes to travel to Milford Sound, a major constraint on local tourism growth. However, the road plan is being criticised by conservation groups, some who consider it a "smokescreen" for more commercial exploitation of the National Park areas, linking it to plans by the National Party to allow mining on conservation land again.

In early March 2010, the government announced that at the current proposed cost, and with the level of tourism benefits likely, the road was a low priority project, and the proposal would not be taken further at this stage.

== Milford Dart Tunnel ==
A proposal for a Milford Dart Tunnel private coach road was approved in principle by the Minister for Conservation in 2012, against the advice of the relevant regional conservation boards. There is concern that the project could impact the river and the valley's previously isolated botany and fauna, in particular that run-off from the tunnel construction site might foul the pristine Hollyford River. The proposal has been slightly amended since its introduction in 2011 but concern remains that making the unspoilt natural area, which attracts more adventurous sightseers and hikers, more road accessible may compromise both conservation and, in the longer term, the attractiveness of the remote area.

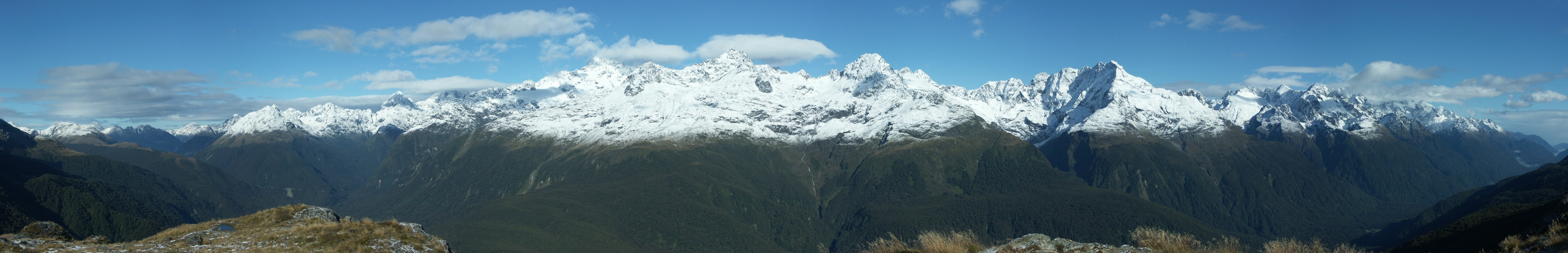
A view over Hollyford Valley.
