= Patrick Caples =

New Zealand gold prospector, explorer and mine director

Patrick Quirk Caples (c. 1830 – 27 November 1904) was a New Zealand gold prospector, explorer and mine director. He was born in Bilboa, County Limerick, Ireland, in about 1830.
