= Hollyford River =

Hollyford River / Whakatipu Kā Tuka
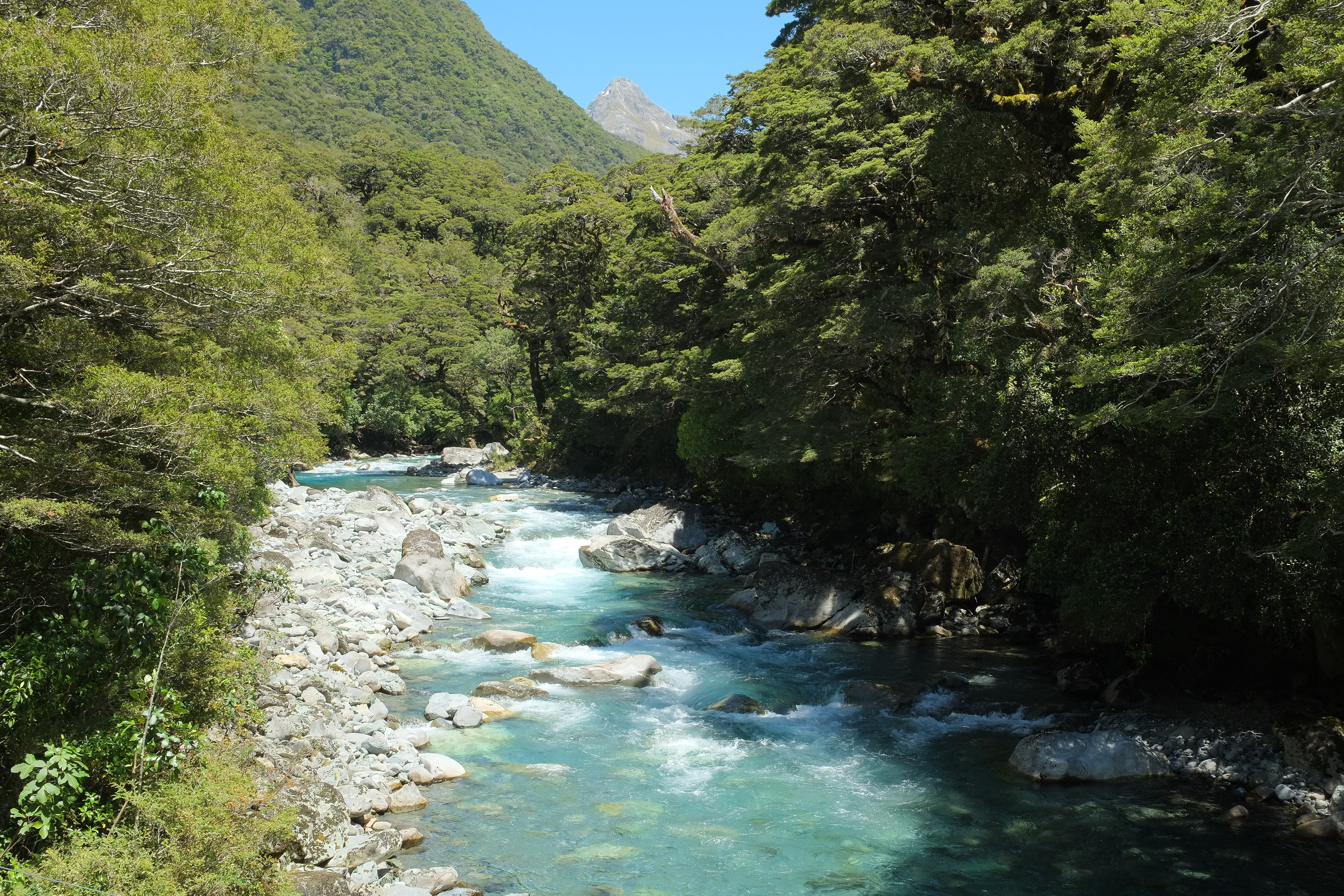
- Route of Hollyford River / Whakatipu Kā Tuka
- Mouth of Hollyford River / Whakatipu Kā Tuka Hollyford River (South Island) Hollyford River (New Zealand)

Location
- Country: New Zealand

Physical characteristics
- Source
  - location: Darran Mountains, Fiordland
  - coordinates: 44°46′34″S 168°00′34″E
- Mouth
  - location: Martins Bay, Tasman Sea
  - coordinates: 44°20′15″S 168°00′00″E
  - elevation: 0 m (0 ft)
- Length: 72 km (45 mi)

Basin features
- Progression: Hollyford River → Martins Bay → Tasman Sea
- Tributaries
  - left: Cirque Creek, Marian Creek, Caples Creek, Moraine Creek, Chasm Creek, Cleft Creek, Madeline Creek, Glacier Creek, Stickup Creek
  - right: Homers River, Monkey Creek, Windfall Creek, Disappointment Creek, Falls Creek, Divide Creek, Sunny Creek, Roaring Creek, Potters Creek, Humboldt Creek, Eel Creek, Swamp Creek, Hidden Falls Creek, Rainbow Creek, Pyke River, Jerusalem Creek
- Waterbodies: Lake McKerrow / Whakatipu Waitai

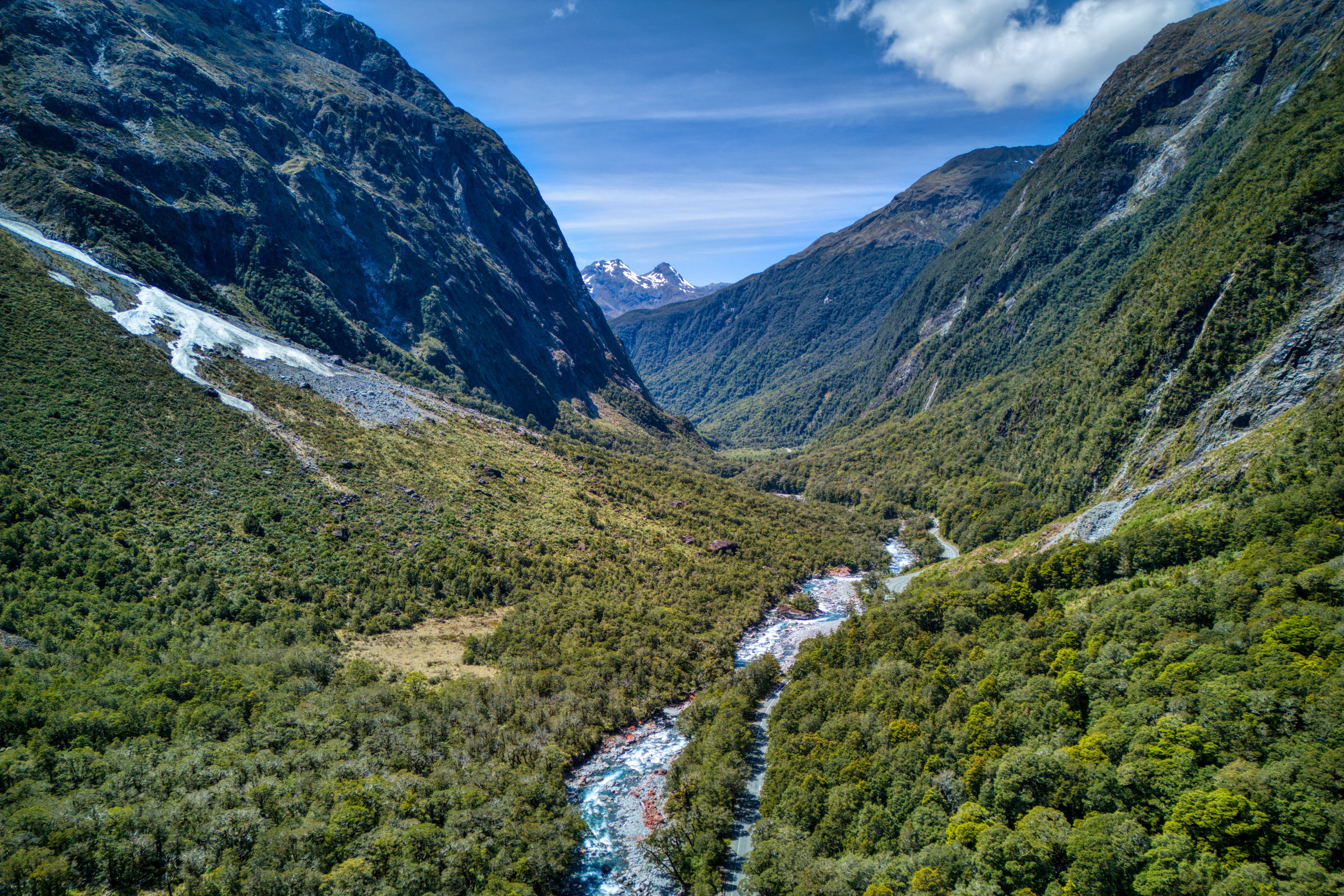
Hollyford Valley and River

The Hollyford River / Whakatipu Kā Tuka is in the southwest of the South Island of New Zealand. It runs for 72 kilometres (45 mi) through Fiordland, its sources being close to the Homer Tunnel and in Gertrude Valley in the southern Darran Mountains.

At first, the river flows southeast and east, coming as close as 1 km to the east–west divide of the South Island, before continuing north through the glacier-formed Hollyford Valley. Near the end, the river passes through Lake McKerrow before reaching Martins Bay on the coast of the Tasman Sea 25 kilometres (16 mi) north of Milford Sound.

The Hollyford Track follows the river's course. Part of the river's course is traditionally regarded as the boundary between the Southland and Otago regions, however, current maps show the entirety of the Hollyford Valley contained within the Southland Region.

In January 1863, Patrick Caples explored the river, naming it after his home town of Hollyford, County Tipperary in Ireland. Following the passage of the Ngāi Tahu Claims Settlement Act 1998, the name of the river was officially altered to Hollyford River / Whakatipu Kā Tuka.

In September 1863 James Hector used the names Kaduku River and Kakapo Lake for Hollyford River and Lake M’Kerrow. These names were occasionally used in later accounts.

Three sections of the river are regularly travelled by kayak:

- Monkey Creek - Falls Creek: Grade: V+
- Falls Creek - Marian Swingbridge: Grade: III - IV
- Marian Creek Run: Grade: IV - V
