= Tuhawaiki Mountain =

Mountain in New Zealand

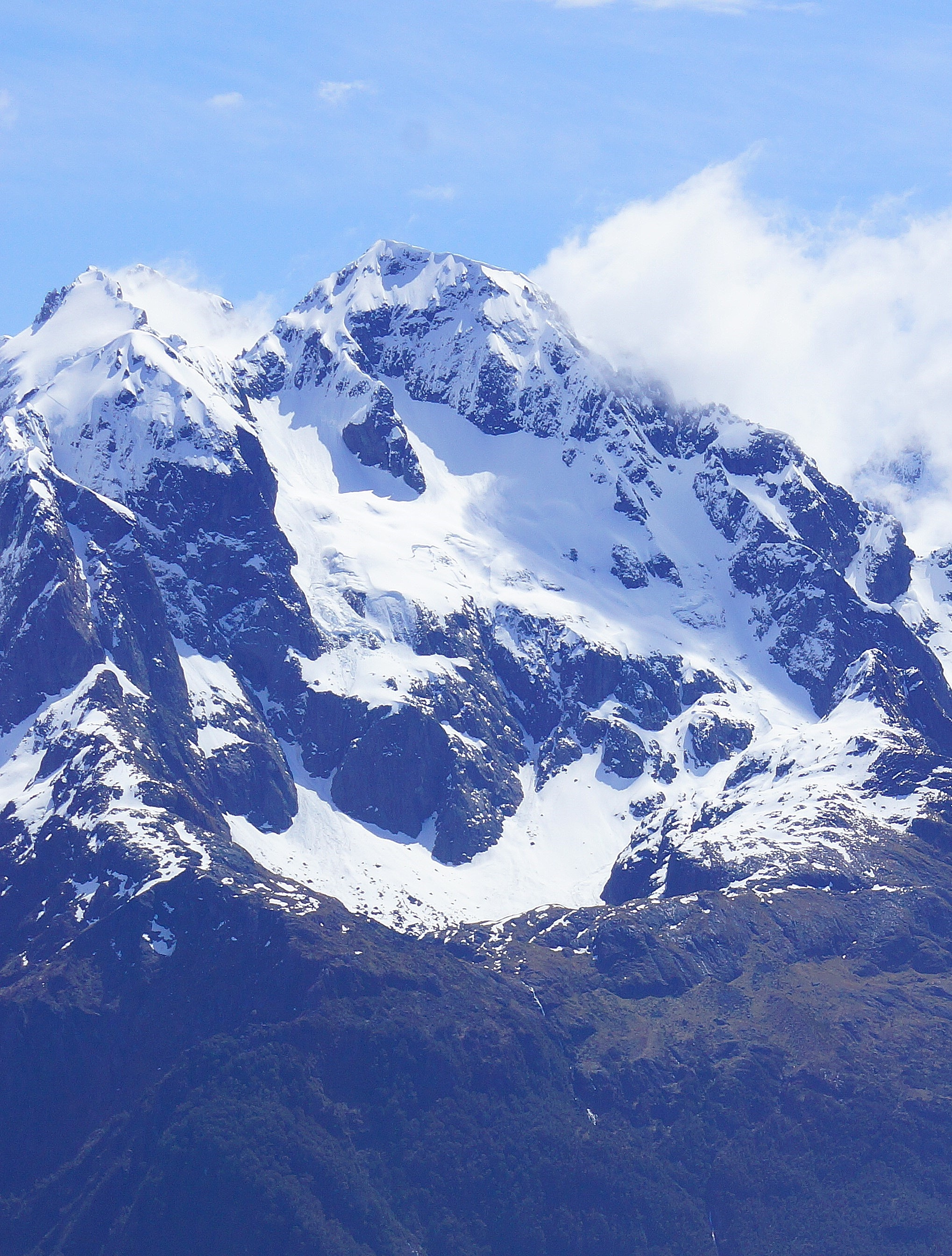
- Southeast aspect

Highest point
- Elevation: 2,092 m (6,864 ft)
- Prominence: 147 m (482 ft)
- Parent peak: Mount Tūtoko
- Isolation: 1.29 km (0.80 mi)
- Coordinates: 44°41′02″S 168°04′39″E

Naming
- Etymology: Named for Tūhawaiki

Geography
- Location within New Zealand
- Interactive map of Tuhawaiki Mountain
- Location: South Island
- Country: New Zealand
- Region: Southland
- Protected area: Fiordland National Park
- Parent range: Darran Mountains
- Topo map: NZMS260 D40

Geology
- Rock age: 136 ± 1.9 Ma
- Rock type(s): Gabbronorite, dioritic orthogneiss

Climbing
- First ascent: February 1937

Tuhawaiki Mountain, also known as Mount Tuhawaiki, is a 2,092-metre-elevation (6,864-foot) mountain in Fiordland, New Zealand.

== Description ==
Tuhawaiki Mountain is part of the Darran Mountains. It is situated in the Southland Region of South Island, and set within Fiordland National Park which is part of the Te Wahipounamu UNESCO World Heritage Site. Precipitation runoff from the mountain drains into tributaries of the Hollyford River. Topographic relief is significant as the summit rises 2,000 metres (6,562 feet) above the Hollyford Valley in three kilometres.

== History ==
The first ascent of the summit was made in February 1937 by Alex Dickie and Jim Speden. The mountain was named by Alex Dickie to honour Tūhawaiki, a paramount chief of the Ngāi Tahu Māori iwi. This mountain's toponym has been officially approved as Tuhawaiki Mountain by the New Zealand Geographic Board.

== Climate ==
Based on the Köppen climate classification, Tuhawaiki Mountain is located in a marine west coast climate zone, with a subpolar oceanic climate (Cfc) at the summit. Prevailing westerly winds blow moist air from the Tasman Sea onto the mountain, where the air is forced upwards by the mountains (orographic lift), causing moisture to drop in the form of rain and snow. This climate supports the Korako Glacier on the peak's south slope. The months of December through February offer the most favourable weather for viewing or climbing this peak.

== Climbing ==
Climbing routes with the first ascents:

- South East Ridge – Alex Dickie, Jim Speden – (1937)
- West Ridge – A. M. Green, Jim Milne, Richard Stewart – (1959)
- North Ridge – John Cocks, Richard Whinham, Al Smith, Pete Glasson – (1972)
- Walk-off Spur – John McCallum, Tom Riley, Dave Vass – (2013)
- Over the Rain Bro – Kester Brown, Greg Jack, Troy Mattingley – (2014)
- Weigh a Pie – Mike Buchanan, Kieran Parsons – (2015)
- South Face – Stephen Skelton, Ben Dare – (2016)

== See also ==
- List of mountains of New Zealand by height
- Fiordland

== Gallery ==
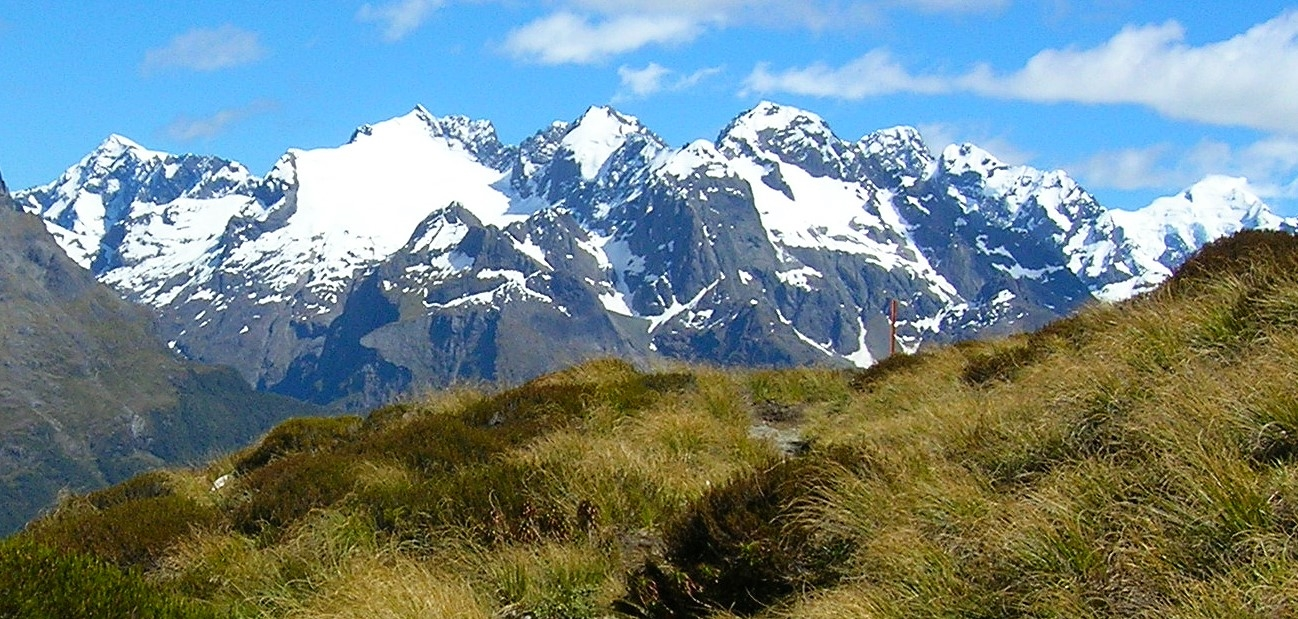
Tuhawaiki Mountain right of centre

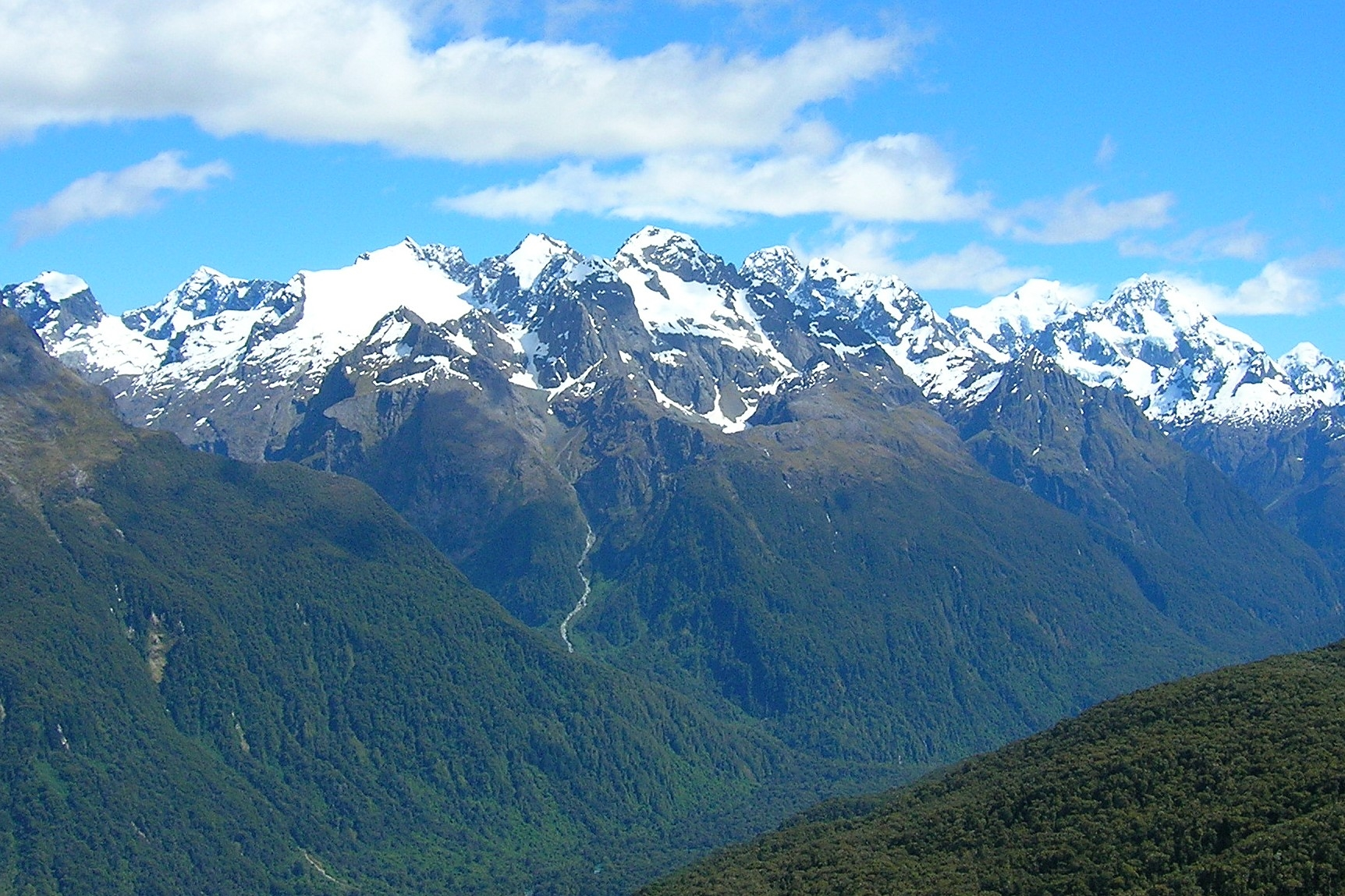
Tuhawaiki Mountain centred

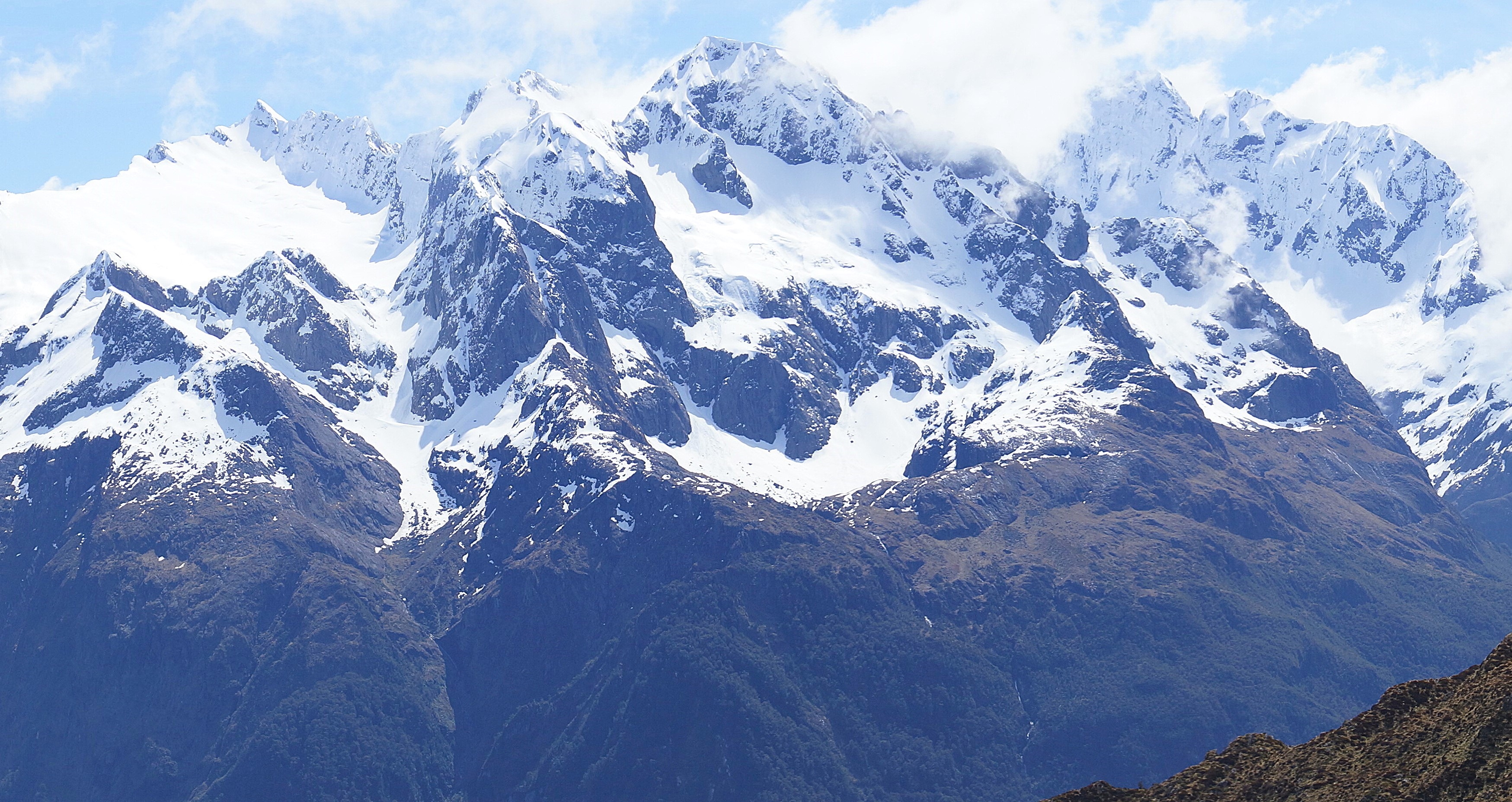
Tuhawaiki Mountain centred, Mount Revelation (left), Te Wera Peak (right)
