= Te Wera =

Te Wera (Māori for "the burning") may refer to:

== People ==
- Te Wera (ca. 1760–70s), rangatira of Kai Tahu based at Huriawa Peninsula
- Te Wera Hauraki (died 1839), rangatira of Ngapuhi based at Te Mahia
- Penetana Papahurihia (Te Atua Wera; died 1875), tohunga of Ngapuhi
- Ngāti Te Wera, a hapū of Whanganui Māori

== Places ==
- Te Wera Peak, a mountain in New Zealand
- Paterson Inlet / Whaka a Te Wera, Stewart Island/Rakiura, New Zealand

== See also ==
- Wera (disambiguation)
- Te Urewera
