= Tūhawaiki =

New Zealand Māori chief (c. 1805–1844)

Tūhawaiki (c. 1805 – 10 October 1844) – often known as Hone Tūhawaiki, John Tūhawaiki or Jack Tūhawaiki, or by his nickname of "Bloody Jack" – became a paramount chief of the Ngāi Tahu Māori iwi in the southern part of the South Island of New Zealand, and was based predominantly on Ruapuke Island. He gained his nickname from early interactions with Foveaux Strait whalers on account of his red coats bought off soldiers in Australia that he and his whaling crew wore.

Born at Inch Clutha in South Otago in the early years of the 19th century, he gained prominence in about 1833 when a war-party led by him defeated the Ngāti Toa chief Te Rauparaha at Lake Grassmere. The Ngāti Toa leader escaped with his life only through luck. Four years later, a war-party led by Tūhawaiki and Taiaroa inflicted severe damage on Ngāti Toa troops in a number of raids. Around the same time, Tūhawaiki became Ngāi Tahu chief upon the death of his uncle, Te Whakataupuka. He gained a reputation as a bold and intelligent military leader, as well as shrewd and insightful in his non-military dealings with pākehā settlers.

On 10 June 1840, Tūhawaiki signed a copy of the Treaty of Waitangi aboard HMS Herald at Ruapuke.

Tūhawaiki became involved in numerous sales of land to settlers and entrepreneurs, notably that of the Otago Block to Frederick Tuckett, Symonds, and Clarke for £2,400 in July 1844.

During the spring of 1844, Tūhawaiki drowned south of Timaru when his boat hit rocks at a location now known as Tūhawaiki Point. Other New Zealand places named in his honour include Jack's Bay and the nearby Tūhawaiki Island in the Catlins, as well as Tuhawaiki Mountain in Fiordland's Darran Mountains.

A number of artefacts belonging or relating to Tūhawaiki still exist in New Zealand museums. The Southland Museum and Art Gallery has a bayonet and a 12-pounder cannon reputedly owned by Tūhawaiki, the Otago Museum has a revolving flintlock rifle thought to be Tūhawaiki's, and the Hocken Collections, University of Otago has a document signed by Tūhawaiki in both English and moko-form.
