= Darran Mountains =

Mountain range in New Zealand

- The Darran Mountains are shaded purple. This map also shows the approximate extent of the geological magma origin Darran Suite of gabbronorite and dioritic orthogneiss in red shading which is named after the mountains, is more resistant to erosion than the other rocks of the mountains, and reaches higher heights.

Highest point
- Elevation: 2,723 m (8,934 ft)
- Parent peak: Mount Tūtoko
- Coordinates: 44°40′S 168°05′E

Geography
- Location: Fiordland, South Island, New Zealand

Geology
- Rock age: 138–136 Ma
- Rock type: Diorite
- Last eruption: 136 ± 1.9 Ma

Climbing
- Normal route: Homer Tunnel
- Access: State Highway 94 (New Zealand)

The Darran Mountains are a prominent range within New Zealand's Fiordland National Park, the country's biggest national park. They contain the park's highest peak, Mount Tūtoko (2,723 metres (8,934 ft)).

== Geography ==
The range lies between Milford Sound (Piopiotahi) and the valley of the Cleddau River (to the west) and the broad valley of the Hollyford River to the east at the northern end of the national park. They are bounded to the south by the Homer Saddle, which separates them from the Wick Mountains, and to the north by the coast of the Tasman Sea. The Homer Tunnel lies under the southwesternmost extreme of the range.

Other than Mount Tūtoko, other prominent peaks in the range include Mount Madeline and Mount Christina. Numerous lakes and tarns are found within the range, among the largest being Lake Adelaide and Lake Marian, and several rivers have their watershed in the mountains, such as the Tūtoko, Kaipo, and Bowen Rivers. The Bowen River, close to its mouth, provides one of Milford Sound's more notable natural attractions, the Bowen Falls.

The mountains were named by Captain J. Stokes, an early surveyor of the West Coast of the South Island.

Selected Peaks in Darran Mountains
Peak	Height	Coordinate	Picture
Mount Tūtoko	2,723 metres (8,934 ft)	44°35′41″S 168°00′45″E	Mount Tūtoko from the south
Mount Madeline	2,536 metres (8,320 ft)	44°36′51″S 168°02′45″E	Mount Madeline
Mount Christina	2,474 metres (8,117 ft)	44°47′35″S 168°02′55″E	Mount Christina
Te Wera Peak	2,309 metres (7,575 ft)	44°39′30″S 168°03′15″E	Te Wera Peak
Mount Crosscut	2,263 m (7,425 ft)	44°45′50″S 168°01′51″E	Mount Crosscut beyond Lake Marian in a view toward the northwest
Mount Patuki	2,246 metres (7,369 ft)	44°40′09″S 168°01′24″E	
Mount Grave	2,225 metres (7,300 ft)	44°35′32″S 167°57′12″E	
Mount Underwood	2,222 metres (7,290 ft)	44°40′24″S 168°00′14″E	Mount Underwood
Karetai Peak	2,206 metres (7,238 ft)	44°40′20″S 168°02′45″E	Karetai Peak
Mount Syme	2,188 metres (7,178 ft)	44°37′37″S 168°01′56″E	
Paranui Peak	2,167 metres (7,110 ft)	44°34′17″S 167°58′44″E	
Sabre Peak	2,162 metres (7,093 ft)	44°44′50″S 168°03′09″E	South Face of Sabre
Alice Peak	2,155 metres (7,070 ft)	44°35′02″S 168°02′25″E	Alice Peak
Mount Gifford	2,149 metres (7,051 ft)	44°43′30″S 168°04′33″E	East aspect of Mount Gifford
Mount Talbot	2,105 metres (6,906 ft)	44°45′03″S 167°59′51″E	Mount Talbot
Tuhawaiki Mountain	2,092 metres (6,864 ft)	44°41′02″S 168°04′39″E	Tuhawaiki Mountain
Mount Pembroke	2,015 m (6,611 ft)	44°34′05″S 167°53′08″E	Mount Pembroke
Mount Lyttle	1,899 m (6,230 ft)	44°46′32″S 168°05′35″E	Mount Lyttle
Mills Peak	1,825 m (5,988 ft)	44°36′44″S 167°55′42″E	Mills Peak
Barren Peak	1,561 m (5,121 ft)	44°39′41″S 167°57′03″E	Bowen Falls from Milford Sound with Barren Peak behind.
Rover Peak	1,524 m (5,000 ft)	44°35′09″S 167°51′17″E	
The Lion	1,302 m (4,272 ft)	44°36′35″S 167°53′03″E	

== Geology ==
The highest mountains are predominantly composed of a biotite from volcanic diorite dated to 138 ± 2.9 Ma and with younger intrusion dykes of say quartz monzodiorite dated at 136 ± 1.9 Ma. These rocks are part of the Median Tectonic Zone that separates the Western and Eastern provinces of Zealandia rocks. They cover an area of about 740 km^{2} (290 sq mi). The mountains also have components to their north of rocks such as metamorphosed sandstone and gneiss from the Western Province. In the south eastern tip is found quartz diorite.

== Climbing ==
Many of the mountains have known mountain climbing routes.

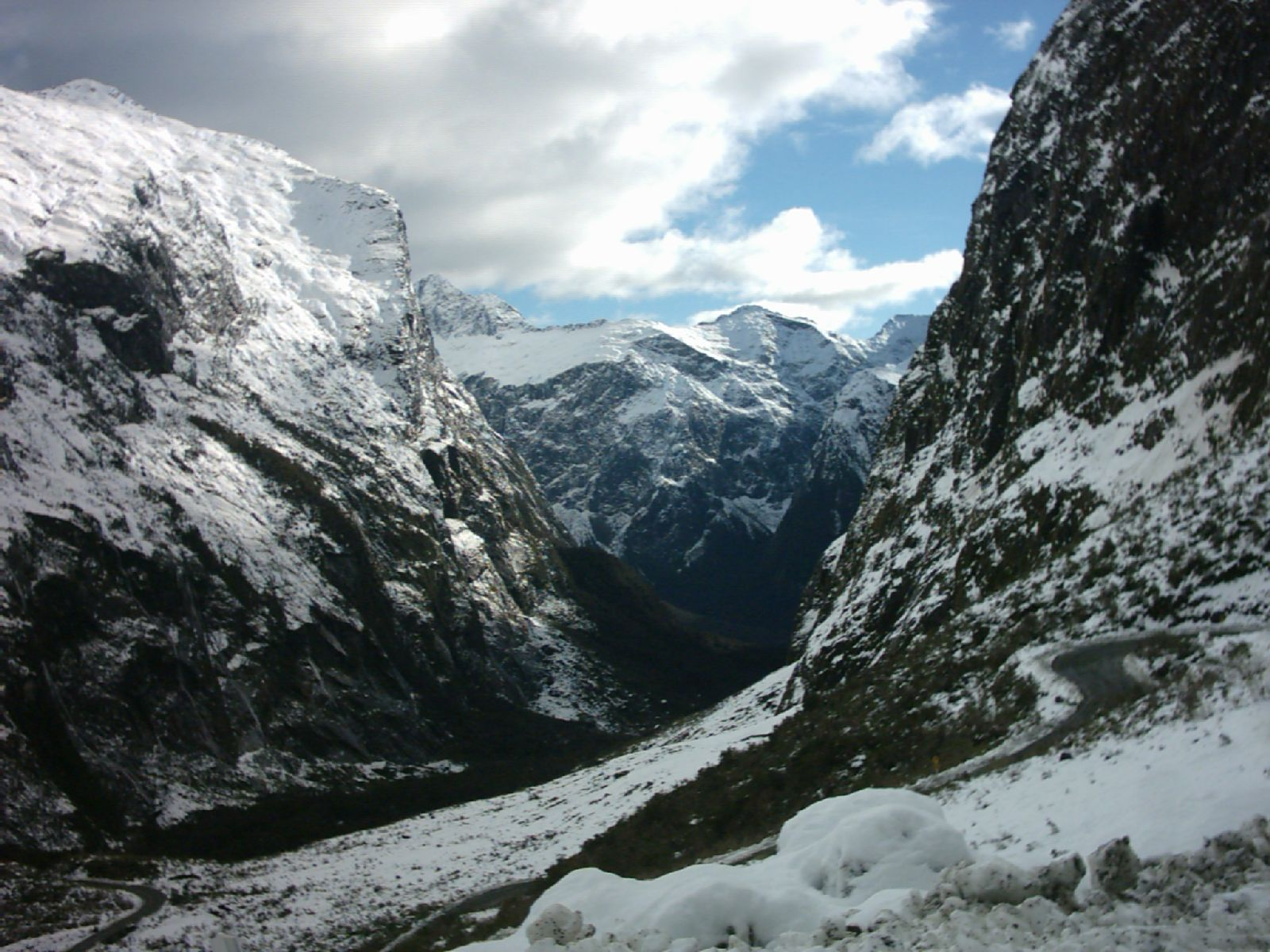
The portal of Homer Tunnel is the most south western extreme of the Darran Mountains

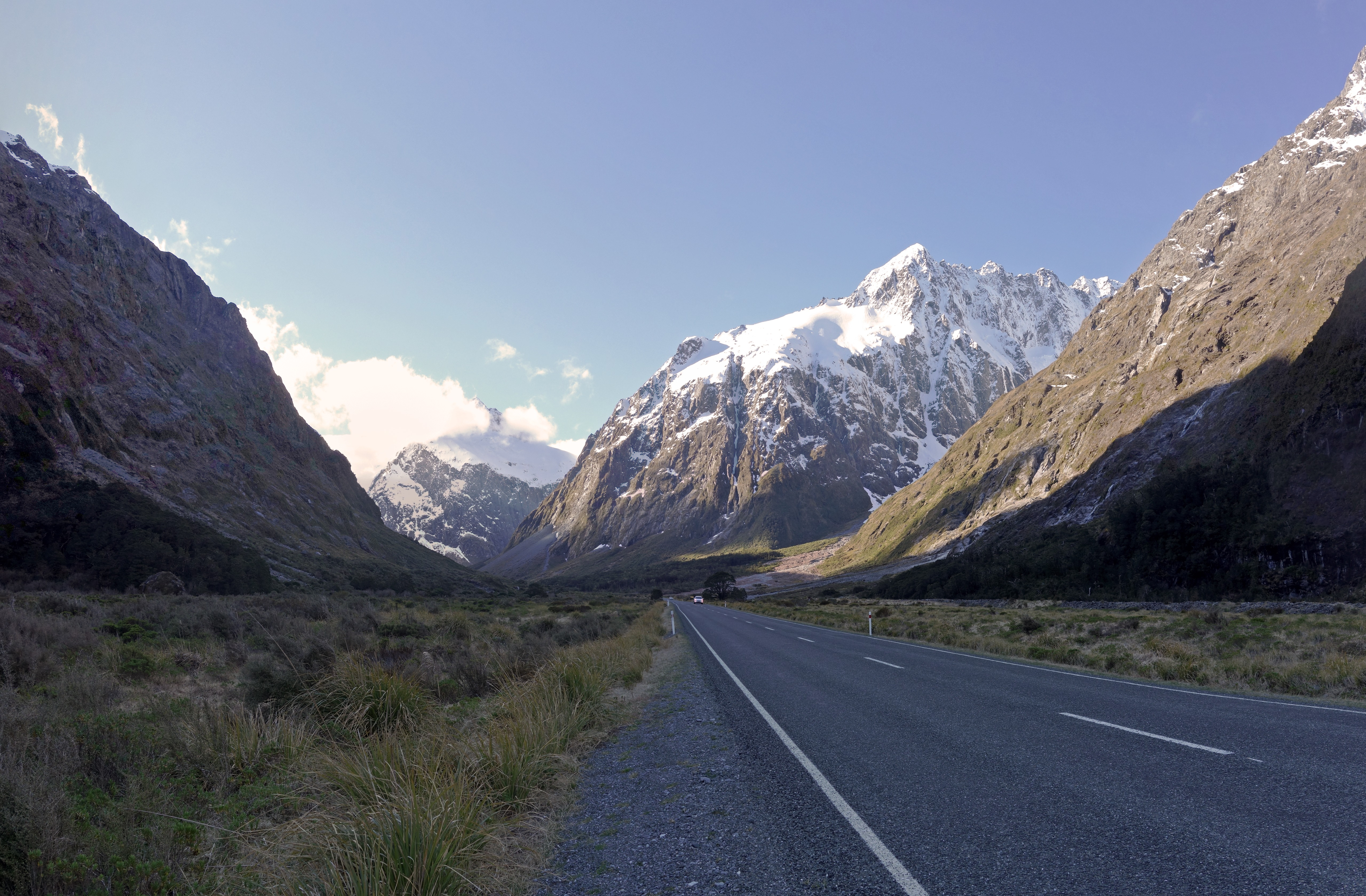
Mount Crosscut in view almost due north from State Highway 94 on its way towards Homer Tunnel from the east.

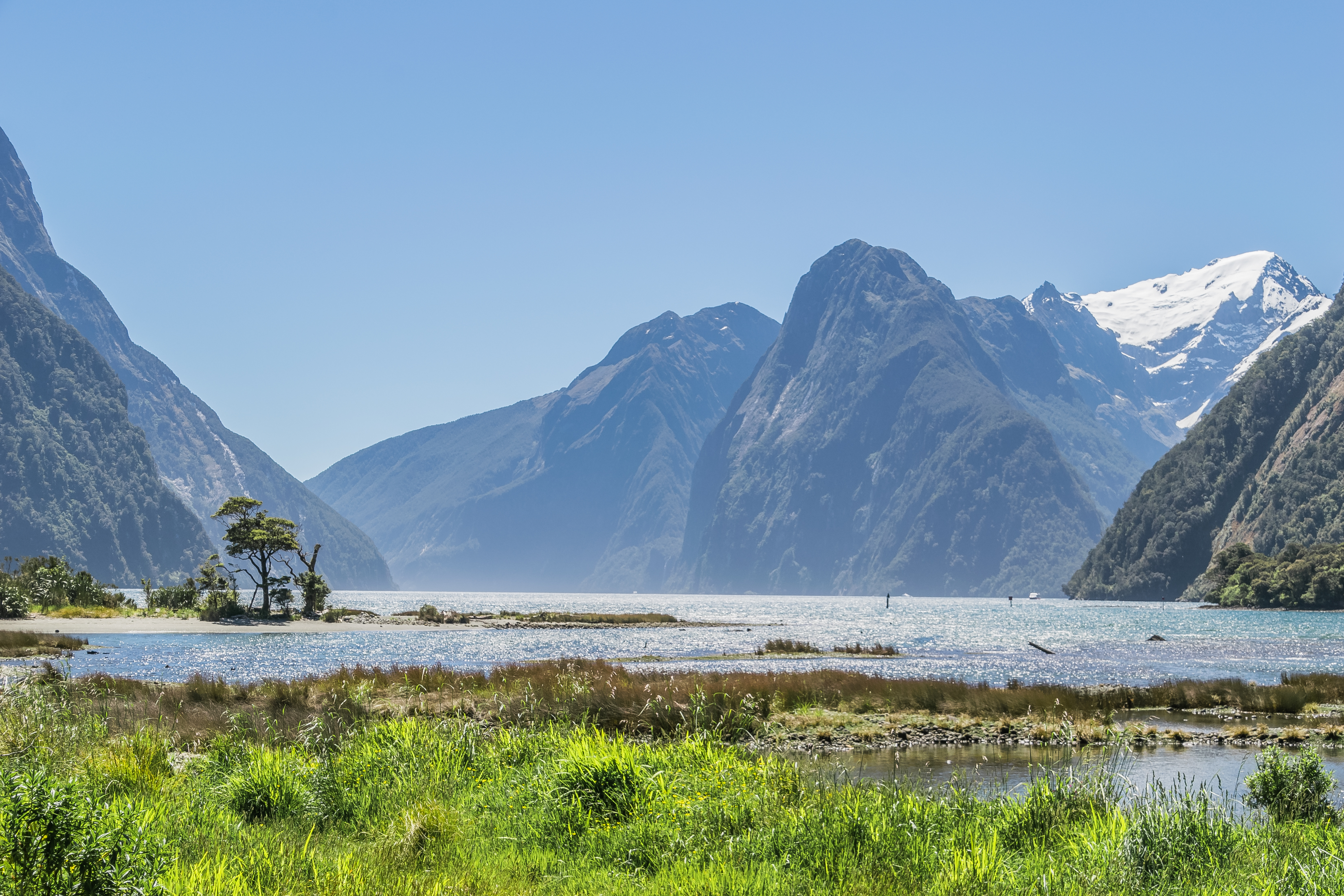
View from head of Milford Sound of some of the Darran Mountains on the north side of sound being The Lion and beyond it Rover Peak 1,524 m (5,000 ft) and snow covered Mount Pembroke 2,015 m (6,611 ft).
