= Alice Peak =

Mountain in New Zealand

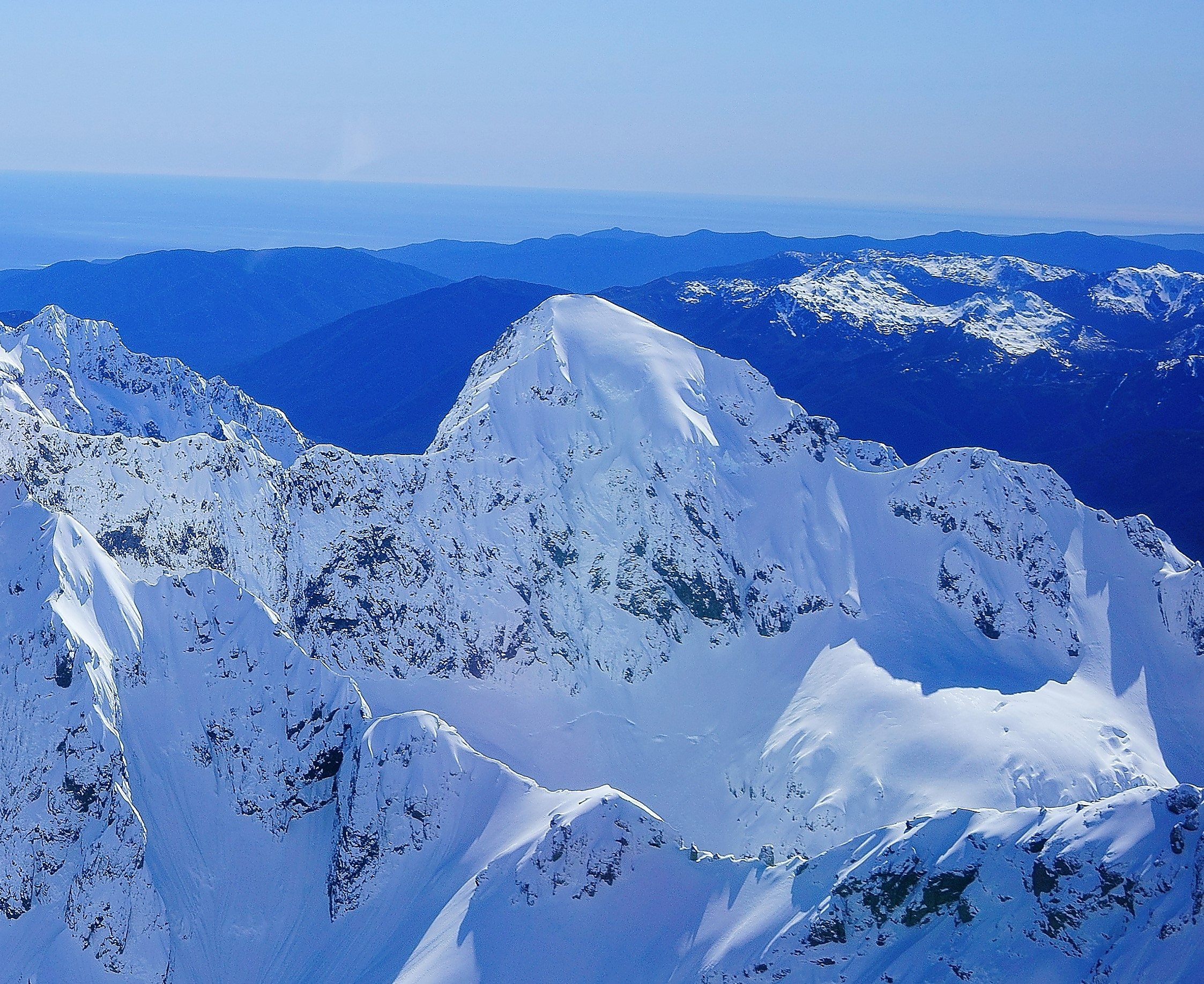
- South aspect, aerial view

Highest point
- Elevation: 2,155 m (7,070 ft)
- Prominence: 255 m (837 ft)
- Parent peak: Mount Tūtoko
- Isolation: 2.5 km (1.6 mi)
- Coordinates: 44°35′02″S 168°02′25″E

Naming
- Etymology: Alice Evans

Geography
- Location within New Zealand
- Interactive map of Alice Peak
- Location: South Island
- Country: New Zealand
- Region: Southland
- Protected area: Fiordland National Park
- Parent range: Darran Mountains
- Topo map: Topo50 CA09

Geology
- Rock age: 136 ± 1.9 Ma
- Rock type(s): Gabbronorite, dioritic orthogneiss

Climbing
- First ascent: 1935

Alice Peak is a 2,155-metre-elevation (7,070-foot) mountain in Fiordland, New Zealand.

== Description ==
Alice Peak is part of the Darran Mountains and is situated in the Southland Region of the South Island. It is set within Fiordland National Park which is part of the Te Wahipounamu UNESCO World Heritage Site. Precipitation runoff from the mountain drains east to the Hollyford River via Stickup and Glacier creeks. Topographic relief is significant as the summit rises 1,950 metres (6,398 feet) above the Hollyford Valley in four kilometres.

== History ==
The first ascent of the summit was made in 1935 by Frank Alack, Kate Gardiner, and Vic Williams. The mountain was named by Kate Gardiner after her late mother, Alice Evans (1851–1924). This mountain's toponym has been officially approved by the New Zealand Geographic Board.

Climbing routes with the first ascents:

- North Ridge – Frank Alack, Kate Gardiner, Vic Williams – (1935)
- South East Ridge – Anna Gillooly, Dave Hiddleston – (2001)
- South West Ridge – FA unknown

== Climate ==
Based on the Köppen climate classification, Alice Peak is located in a marine west coast climate zone, with a subpolar oceanic climate (Cfc) at the summit. Prevailing westerly winds blow moist air from the Tasman Sea onto the mountain, where the air is forced upward by the mountains (orographic lift), causing moisture to drop in the form of rain and snow. This climate supports the Donne Glacier on the peak's slopes. The months of December through February offer the most favourable weather for viewing or climbing this peak.

== See also ==
- List of mountains of New Zealand by height
- Fiordland

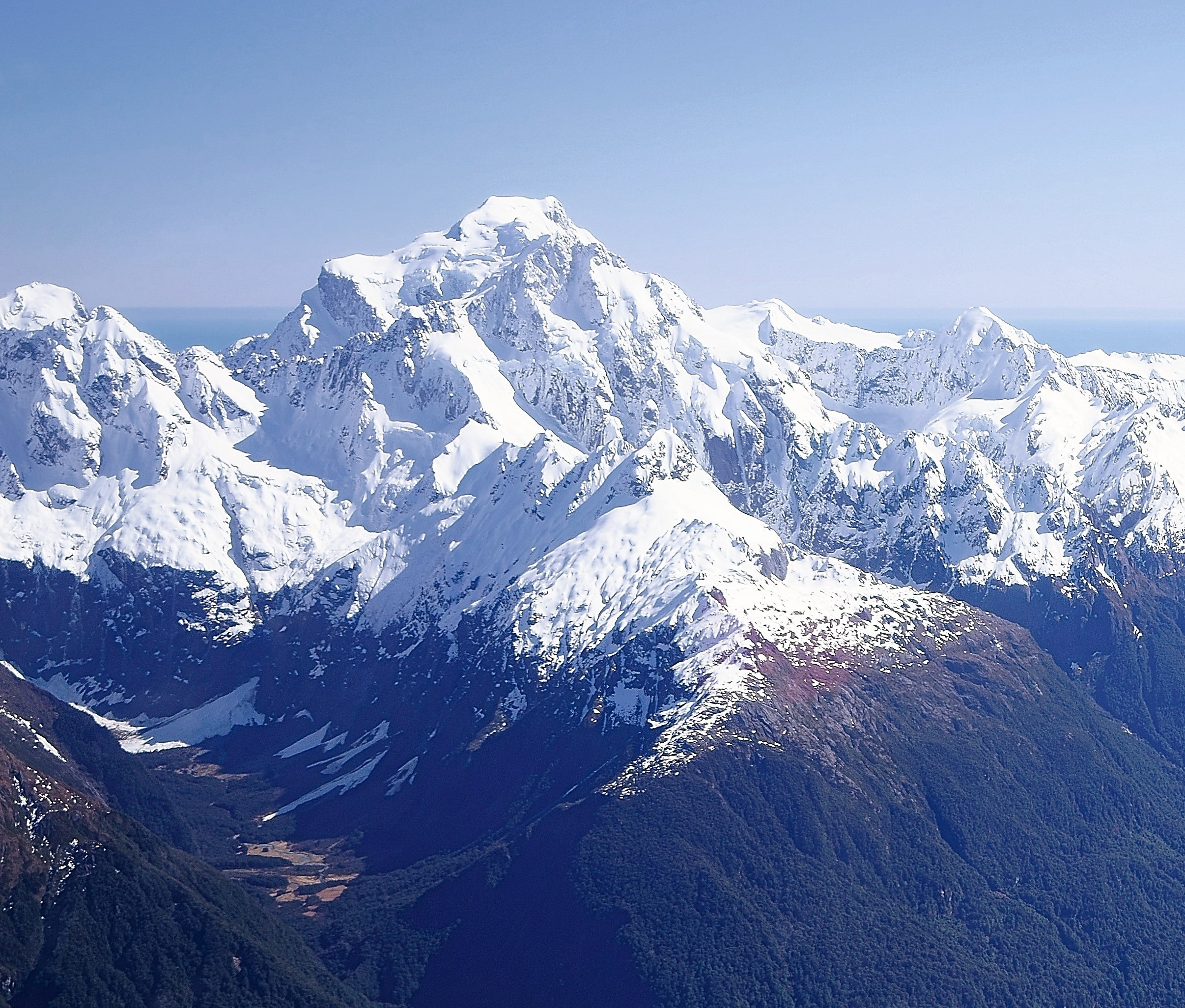
Alice Peak to the right, seen with Mount Tutoko and Mount Madeline (centred)
