= Mills Peak (New Zealand) =

Mountain in Fiordland, New Zealand

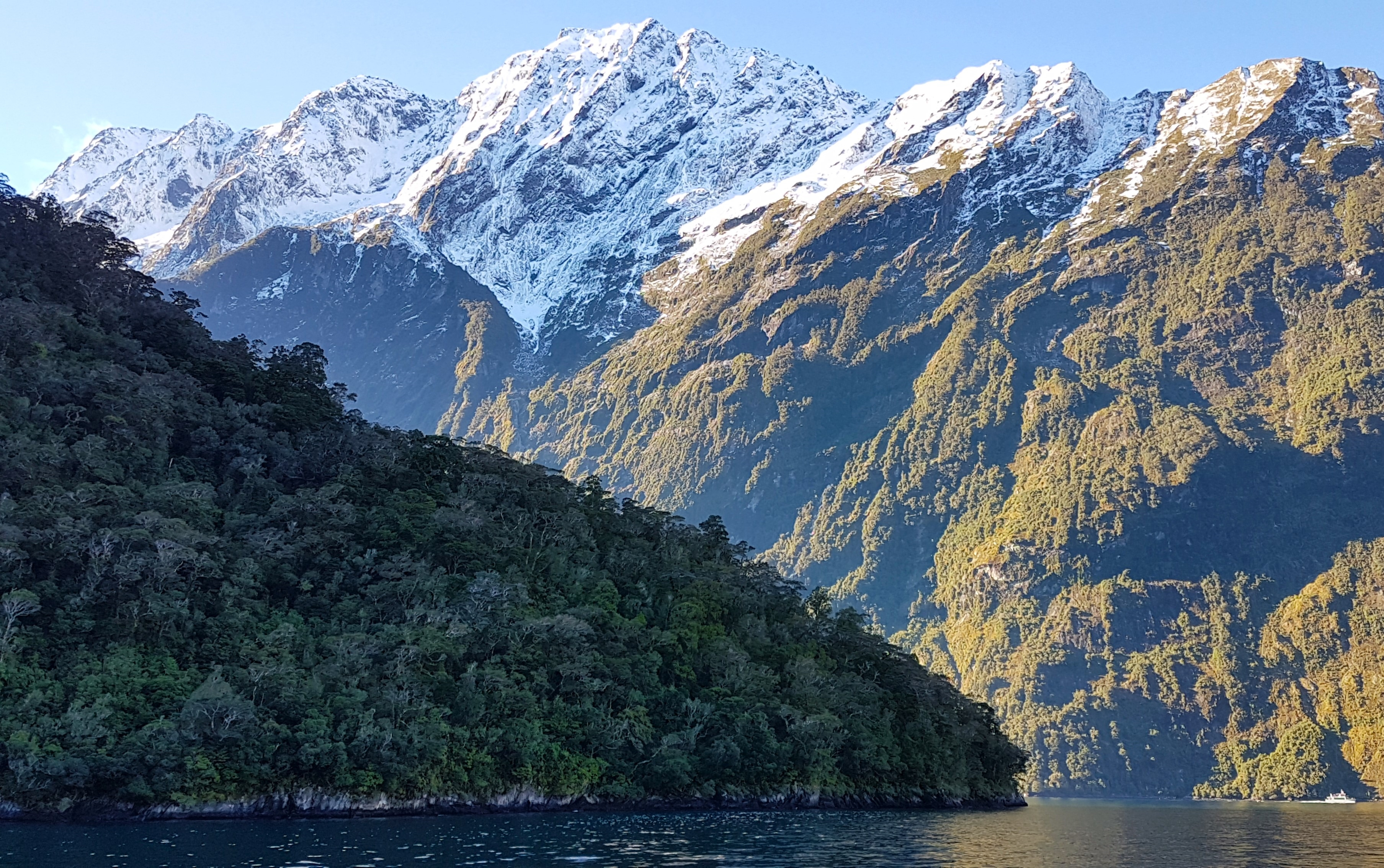
- Southwest aspect

Highest point
- Elevation: 1,825 m (5,988 ft)
- Prominence: 361 m (1,184 ft)
- Isolation: 2.98 km (1.85 mi)
- Coordinates: 44°36′44″S 167°55′42″E

Geography
- Location within New Zealand
- Interactive map of Mills Peak
- Location: South Island
- Country: New Zealand
- Region: Southland
- Protected area: Fiordland National Park
- Parent range: Darran Mountains
- Topo map(s): NZMS260 D40; Topo50 CB08

Geology
- Rock age: 136 ± 1.9 Ma
- Rock type(s): Gabbronorite, dioritic orthogneiss

Mills Peak is an 1,825-metre-elevation (5,988-foot) mountain in Fiordland, New Zealand.

== Description ==
Mills Peak is part of the Darran Mountains where it is situated above Milford Sound in the Southland Region of the South Island. It is set within Fiordland National Park which is part of the Te Wahipounamu UNESCO World Heritage Site. Precipitation runoff from the mountain's east slope drains into the Bowen River, whereas the west slope drains into the Harrison River and Harrison Cove. Topographic relief is significant as the summit rises 1,225 metres (4,019 feet) above the Bowen Valley in one kilometre, and 1,825 metres (5,988 feet) above tidewater at Harrison Cove in 1.5 kilometre. The nearest higher neighbour is Mount Grave, three kilometres to the northeast.

== Climate ==
Based on the Köppen climate classification, Mills Peak is located in a marine west coast climate zone. Prevailing westerly winds blow moist air from the Tasman Sea onto the mountains, where the air is forced upward by the mountains (orographic lift), causing moisture to drop in the form of rain or snow. The months of December through February offer the most favourable weather for viewing or climbing this peak.

== Climbing ==
The first ascent of the South Ridge was made in November 2013 by Paula Macfarlane, Reece McKenzie, and Stanley Mulvany.

== Gallery ==
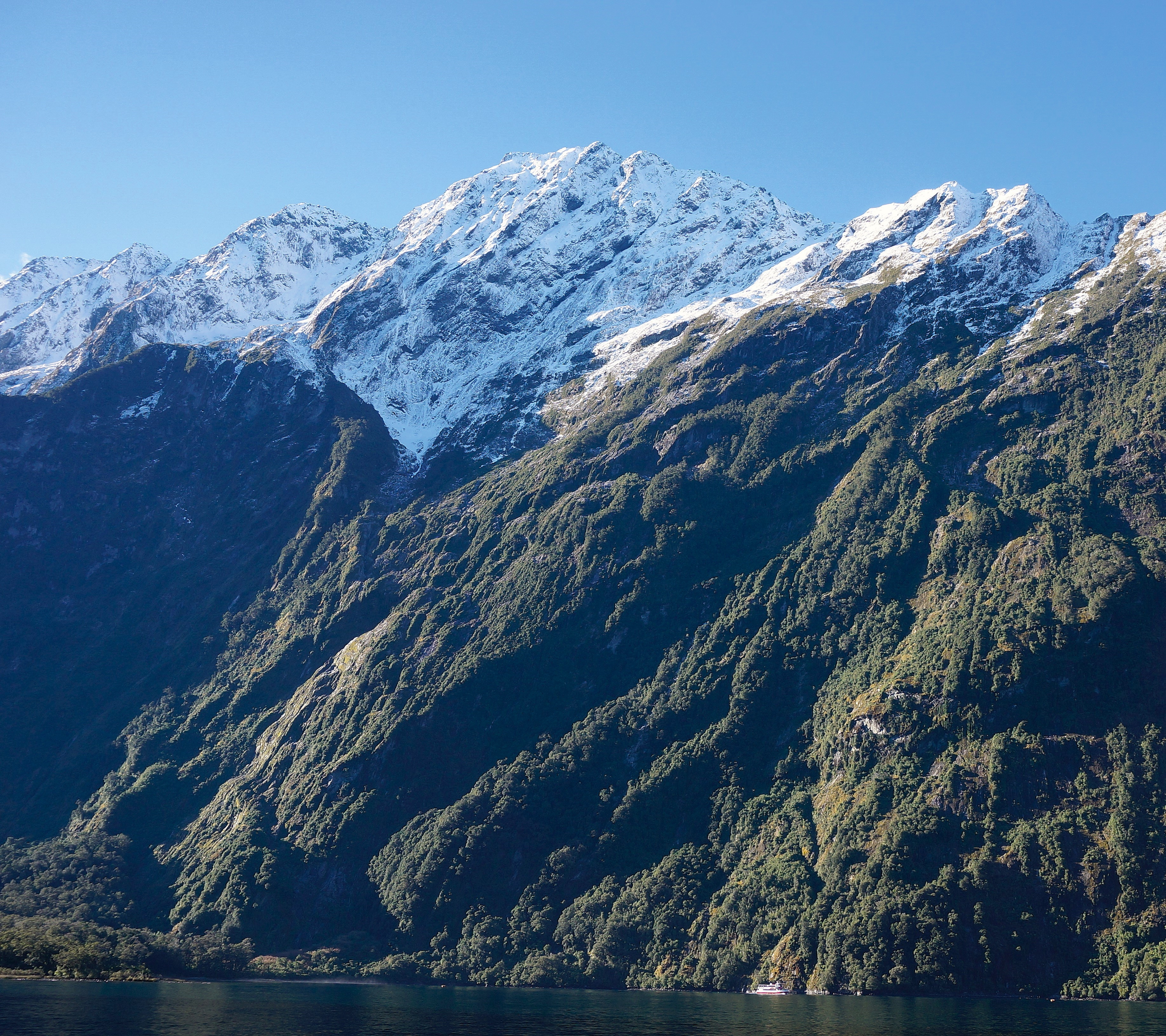
Southwest aspect from Milford Sound

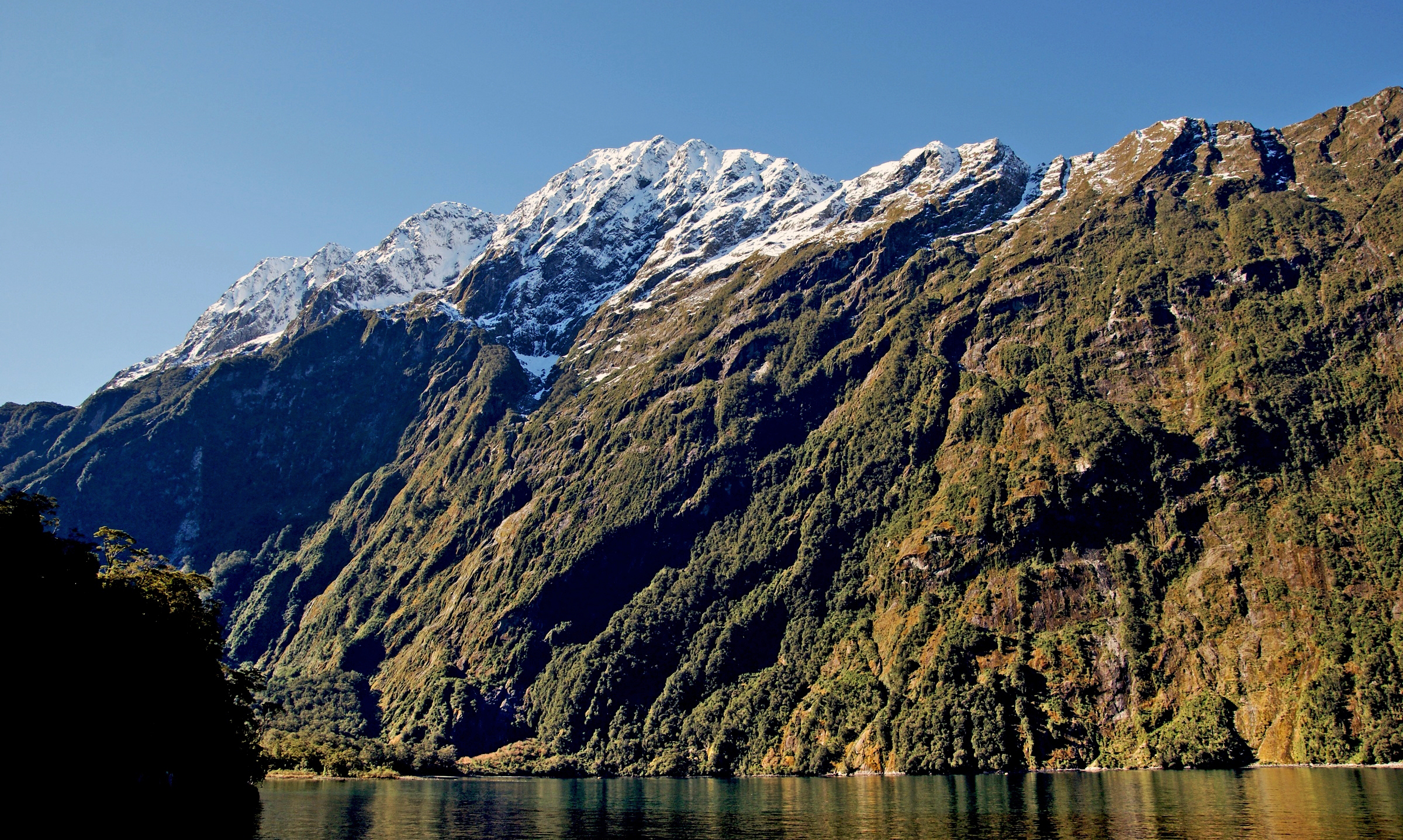
Southwest aspect from Milford Sound

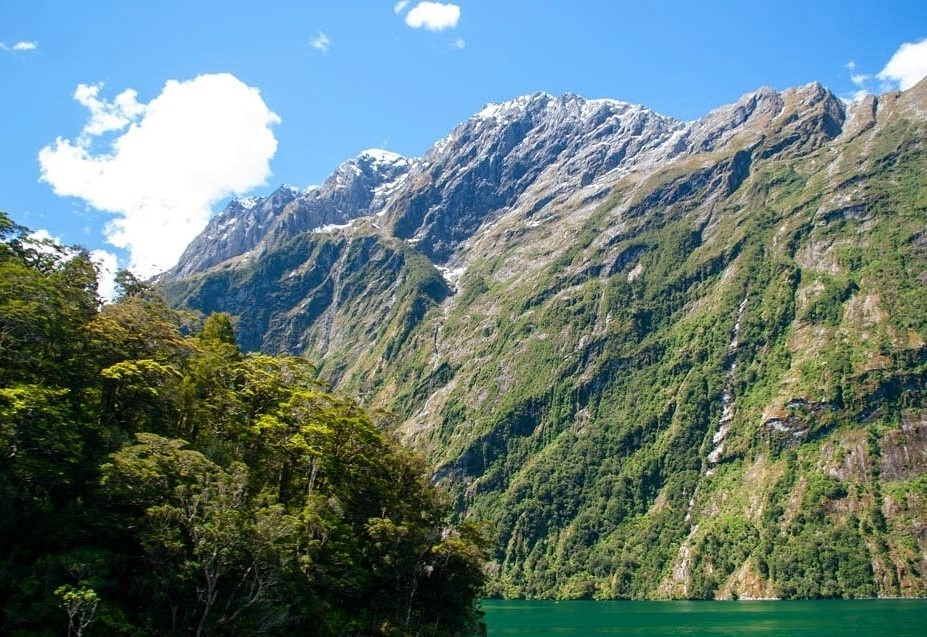

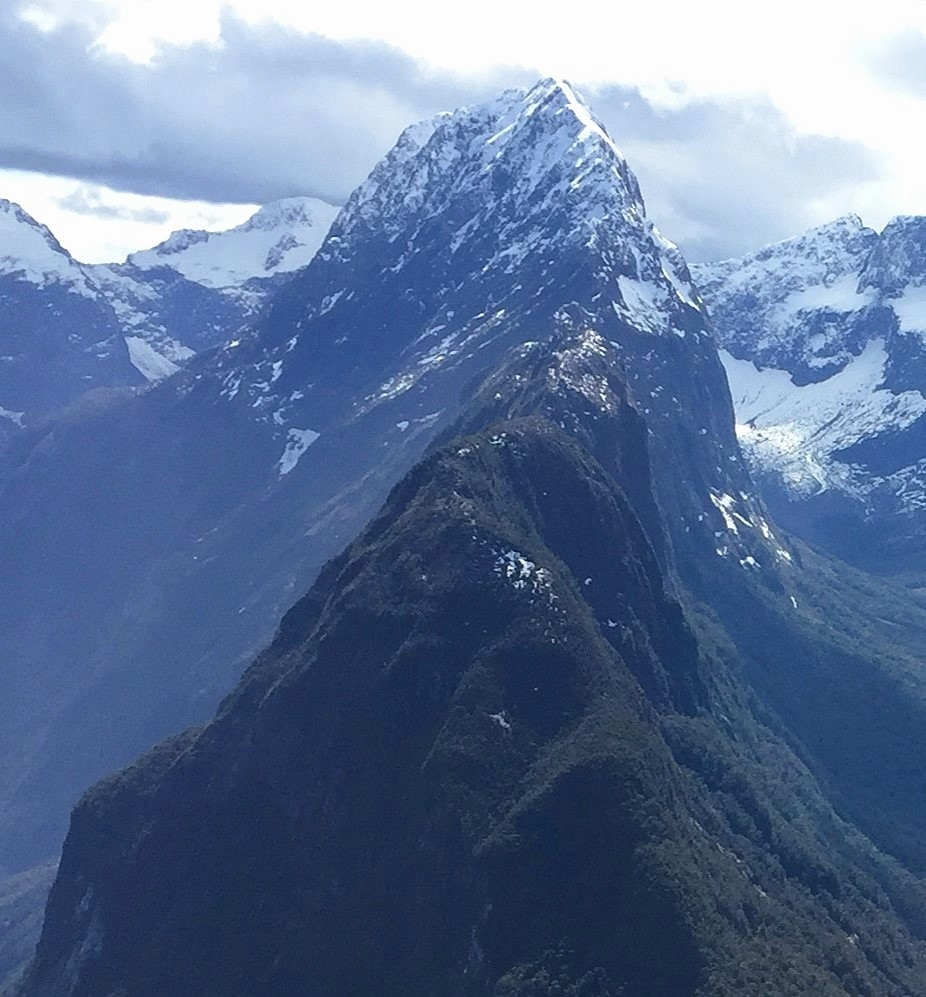
Aerial view of south aspect

== See also ==
- List of mountains of New Zealand by height
