= Karetai Peak =

Mountain in Fiordland, New Zealand

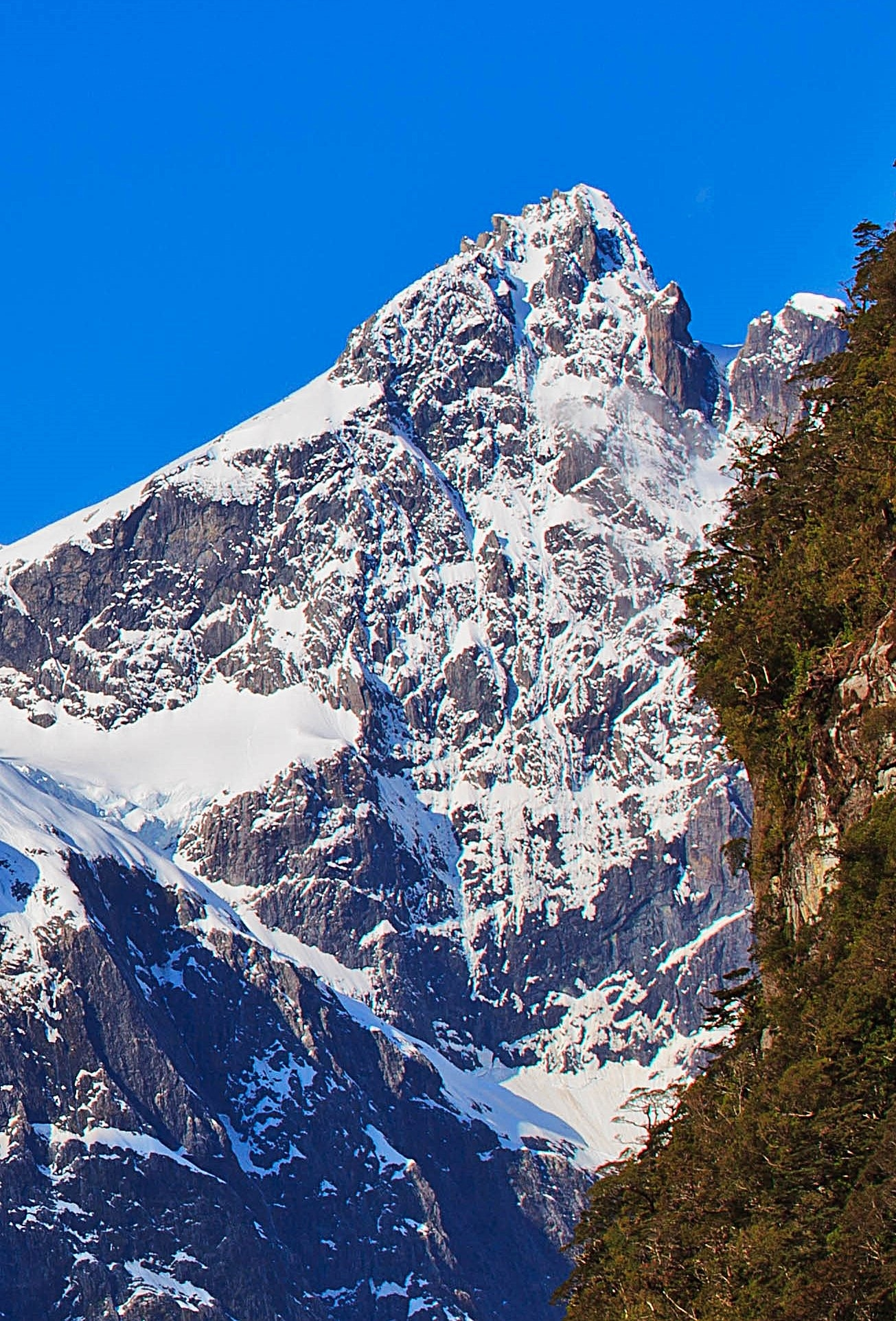
- Southwest aspect

Highest point
- Elevation: 2,206 m (7,238 ft)
- Prominence: 226 m (741 ft)
- Parent peak: Te Wera Peak
- Isolation: 1.67 km (1.04 mi)
- Coordinates: 44°40′20″S 168°02′45″E

Naming
- Etymology: Karetai

Geography
- Location within New Zealand
- Interactive map of Karetai Peak
- Location: South Island
- Country: New Zealand
- Region: Southland
- Protected area: Fiordland National Park
- Parent range: Darran Mountains
- Topo map(s): NZMS260 D40; NZTopo50 CB09

Geology
- Rock age: 136 ± 1.9 Ma
- Rock type(s): Gabbronorite, dioritic orthogneiss

Climbing
- First ascent: 1937

Karetai Peak is a 2,206-metre-elevation (7,238-foot) mountain in Fiordland, New Zealand.

== Description ==
Karetai Peak is part of the Darran Mountains and it is situated nine kilometres east of Milford Sound in the Southland Region of the South Island. It is set within Fiordland National Park which is part of the Te Wahipounamu UNESCO World Heritage Site. Precipitation runoff from the mountain's southwest slope drains into the headwaters of the Donne River, whereas the east slope drains to Chasm Creek and the northwest slope to Cleft Creek which are both tributaries of the Hollyford River. Topographic relief is significant as the summit rises 1,300 metres (4,265 feet) above the Donne Valley in one kilometre. The nearest higher neighbour is Te Wera Peak, 1.67 kilometre to the north. This mountain's toponym has been officially approved by the New Zealand Geographic Board. The peak was named in 1937 by Lindsay Stewart (1917–2010) who made the first ascent of the peak, to honour Karetai (1781–1860), a New Zealand tribal Māori leader.

== Climbing ==
The first ascent of the summit was made in November 1937 by David Lewis and Lindsay Stewart.

Climbing routes with the first ascents:

- North Ridge – David Lewis, Lindsay Stewart – (1937)
- South Ridge – Robin Pettit, Richard Price, Barry Scott, Doug Warren – (1972)
- East Face – Ken Calder, Bruce Clark, Pete Glasson, Al Smith – (1973)
- South West Face – Colin Dodge, Keith Lockwood – (1974)
- West Ridge – FA unknown

== Climate ==
Based on the Köppen climate classification, Karetai Peak is located in a marine west coast climate zone. Prevailing westerly winds blow moist air from the Tasman Sea onto the mountains, where the air is forced upward by the mountains (orographic lift), causing moisture to drop in the form of rain or snow. This climate supports the Taoka Icefall on the peak's west slope and the Te Puoho Glacier on the east slope. The months of December through February offer the most favourable weather for viewing or climbing this peak.

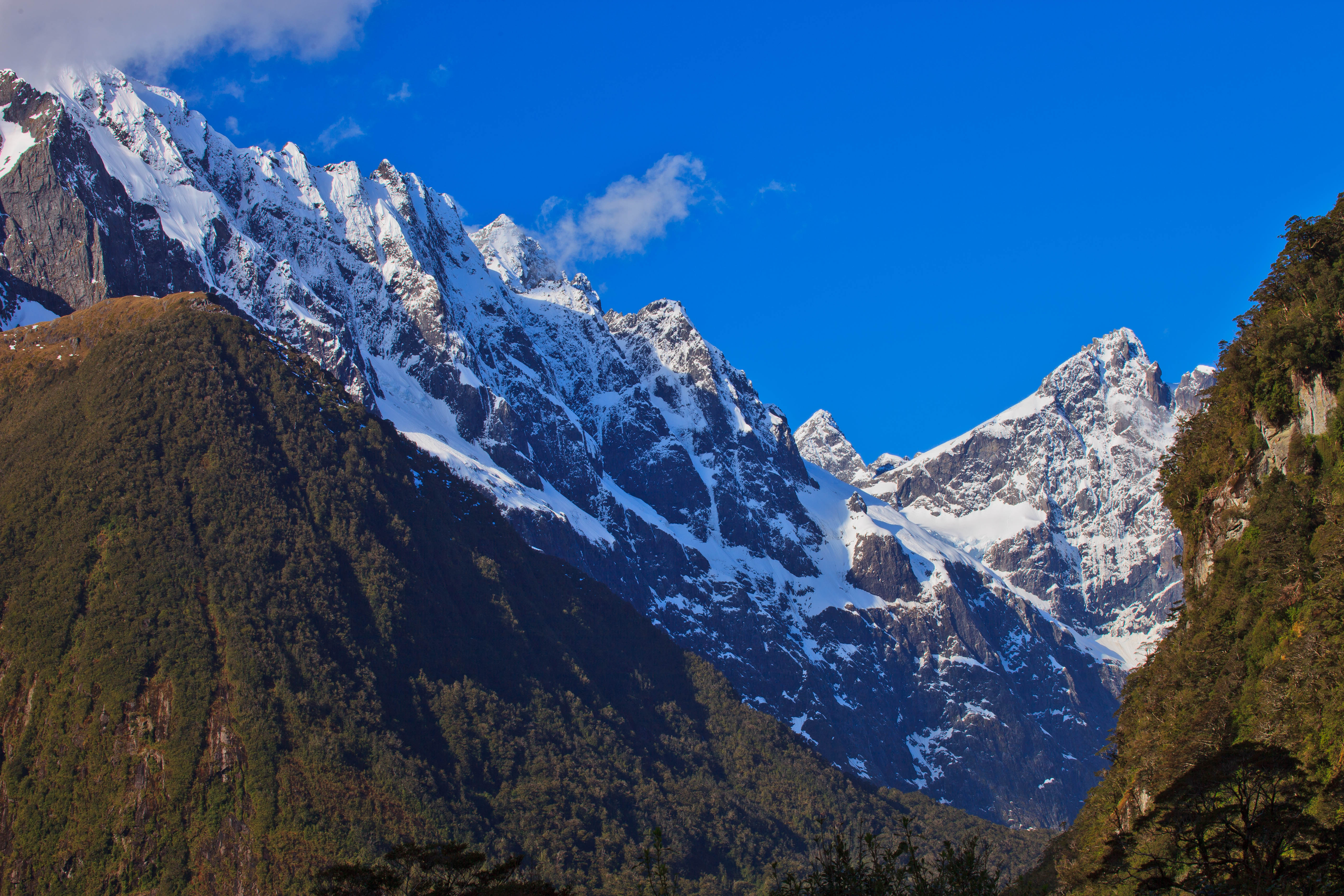
Karetai Peak to the right, Mount Underwood in upper left corner

== See also ==
- List of mountains of New Zealand by height
- Fiordland
