= Sabre Peak =

Mountain in Fiordland, New Zealand

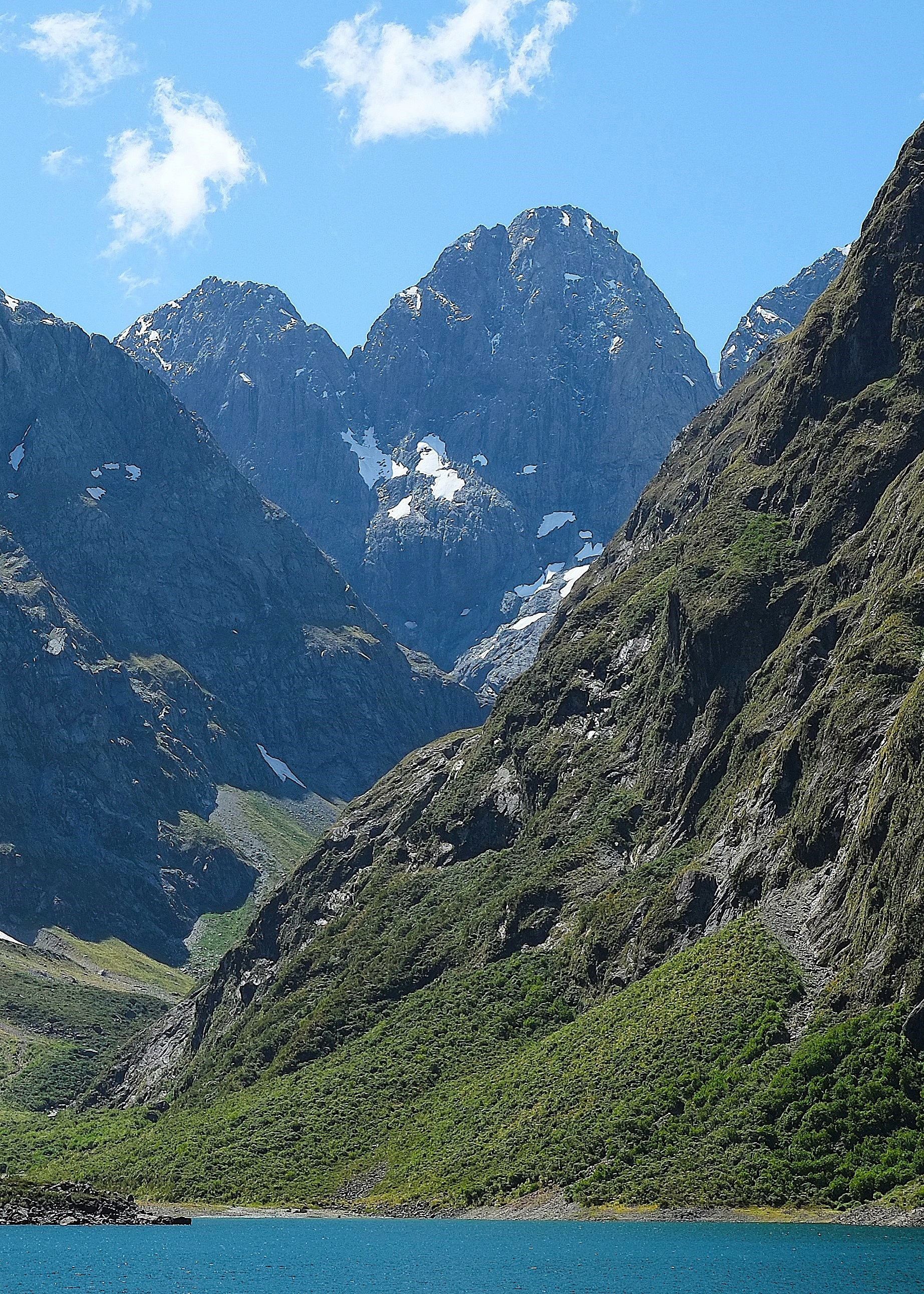
- South Face, from Lake Marian

Highest point
- Elevation: 2,162 m (7,093 ft)
- Prominence: 428 m (1,404 ft)
- Isolation: 2.23 km (1.39 mi)
- Coordinates: 44°44′50″S 168°03′09″E

Naming
- Etymology: Sabre

Geography
- Location within New Zealand
- Interactive map of Sabre Peak
- Location: South Island
- Country: New Zealand
- Region: Southland
- Protected area: Fiordland National Park
- Parent range: Darran Mountains
- Topo map: Topo50 CB09

Geology
- Rock age: 136 ± 1.9 Ma
- Rock type(s): Gabbronorite, dioritic orthogneiss

Climbing
- First ascent: 1954

Sabre Peak is a 2,162-metre-elevation (7,093-foot) mountain in Fiordland, New Zealand.

== Description ==
Sabre Peak is part of the Darran Mountains and is situated in the Southland Region of the South Island. It is set within Fiordland National Park which is part of the Te Wahipounamu UNESCO World Heritage Site. The peak is considered by some to be New Zealand's best rock-climbing peak, with the routes on the South Face among the best. Precipitation runoff from the mountain drains to the Hollyford River via Marian Creek, Moraine Creek, and Caples Creek. Topographic relief is significant as the summit rises over 800 metres (2,625 feet) above Lake Mariana in less than one kilometre, and 1,220 metres (4,003 feet) above Lake Adelaide in two kilometres. The nearest higher neighbour is Mount Crosscut, 2.27 kilometres to the south.

== History ==
The first ascent of the summit was made in December 1954 by Bryce Wood, Dal Ryan, and Bill Gordon. The peak's descriptive name was applied by Bryce Wood and the toponym has been officially approved by the New Zealand Geographic Board.

== Climbing ==
Climbing routes with the first ascents:

- East Ridge – Bryce Wood, Dal Ryan, Bill Gordon – (1954)
- West Ridge – Phil Houghton, Mike Gill – (1959)
- South East Face – Archie Simpson, Bill Stephenson, Peter Barry – (1966)
- North Buttress – Harold Jacobs, Murray Jones – (1968)
- North East Face – Murray Jones, Yvon Chouinard – (1971)
- South Face – Allan Jones, Murray Jones – (1971)
- North West Face – Bill Denz, Phil Herron, Murray Judge – (1974)

== Climate ==
Based on the Köppen climate classification, Sabre Peak is located in a marine west coast climate zone. Prevailing westerly winds blow moist air from the Tasman Sea onto the mountain, where the air is forced upward by the mountains (orographic lift), causing moisture to drop in the form of rain and snow. This climate supports glacierets on the high ridge connecting Sabre with Mount Gunn. The months of December through February offer the most favourable weather for viewing or climbing this peak.

== Gallery ==
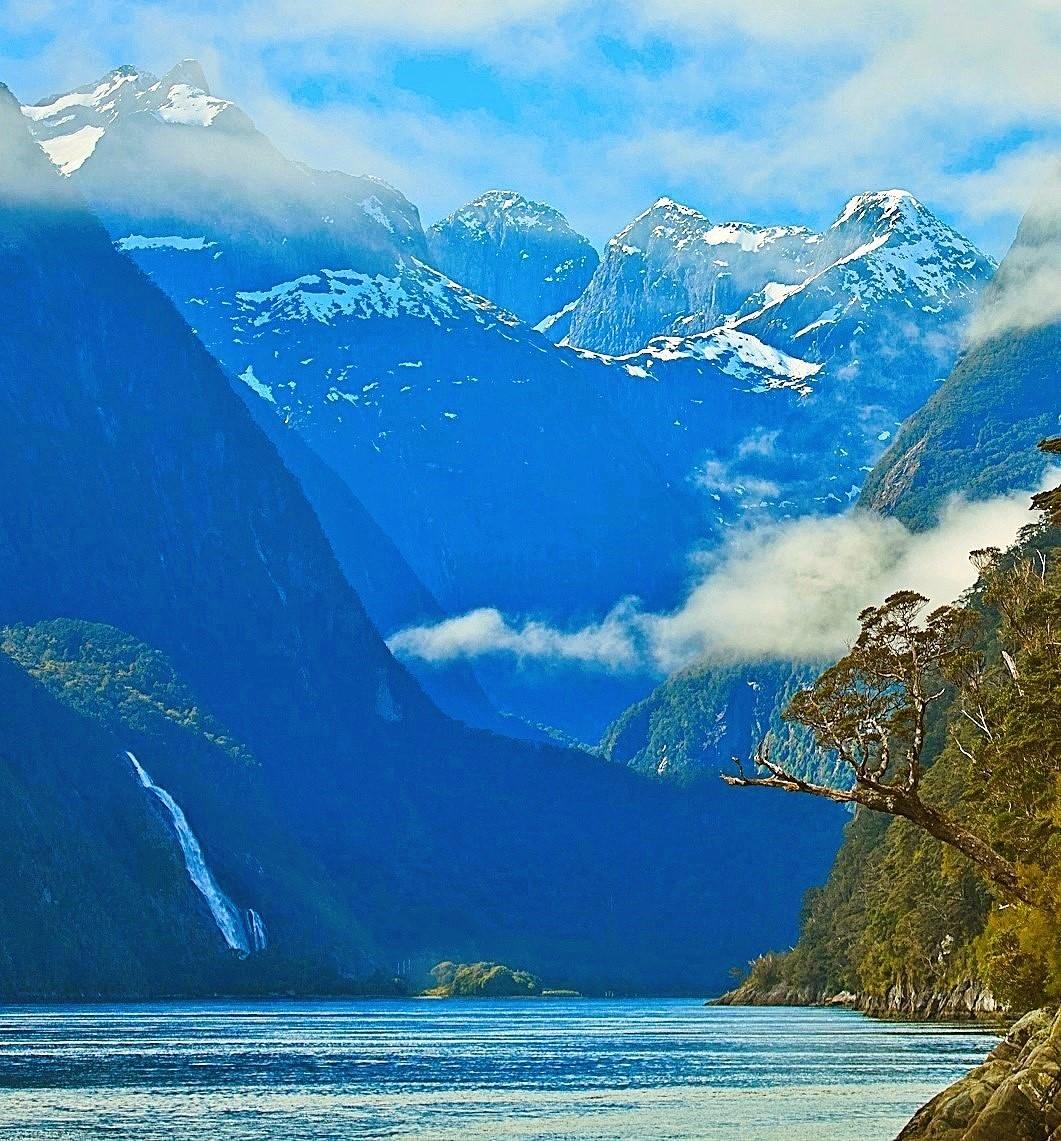
View from Milford Sound with Sabre centred in back

== See also ==
- List of mountains of New Zealand by height
