= Karetai =

Ngai Tahu leader

Karetai (c. 1781 – 30 May 1860), also known as Hone Karetai and Jacky White, was a New Zealand tribal Māori leader. Of Kāti Kurī, Kāti Māmoe, and Waitaha descent, he identified with the Kāi Tahu iwi.

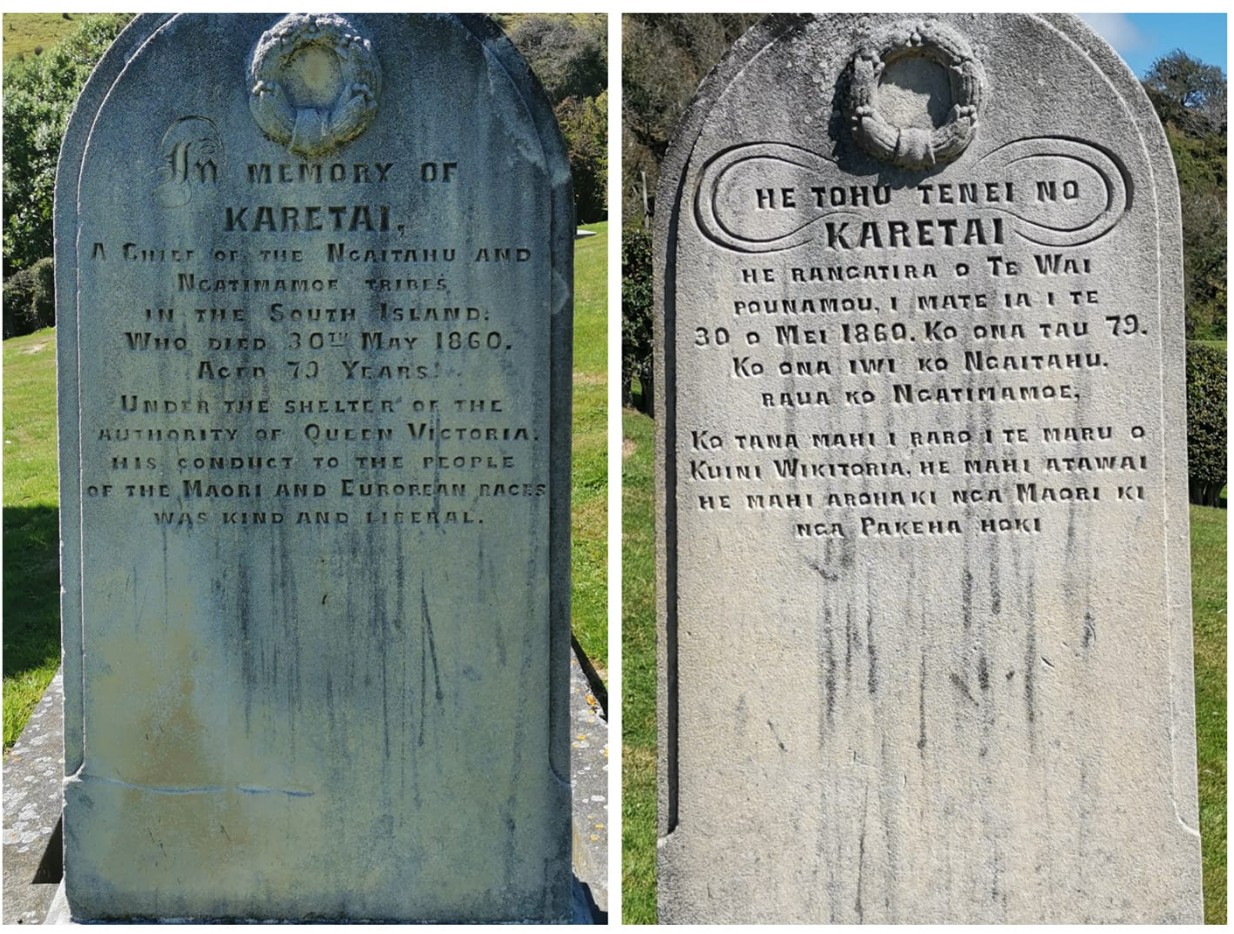

Karetai was born in Ōtākou on Otago Peninsula, the son of Te Ihutakura and Kakatuaheka, and a descendant of tribal ancestor Tahupōtiki on both sides of his whakapapa. He was born in the late eighteenth century, probably around 1781, as he is recorded at his death in 1860 as being 79 years of age. He became a well-respected leader, liaising between his people and the newly arrived Pākehā sealers and whalers. In 1832, Karetai and Tūhawaiki shared command of the first successful counter-attack against Te Rauparaha, of Ngāti Toa at Cook Strait. Karetai was wounded in battle, losing his left eye, and injuring his knee. He was a signatory to the Treaty of Waitangi and to some major subsequent land purchases. Karetai died in 1860 and was buried at Otakou marae.

Karetai is believed to have had eight wives, Pōhata, Hinehou, Pītoko, Te Kōara, Wahine Ororaki, Māhaka, Hinepakia, and Te Horo, and at least ten children. Several of Karetai's whānau also became prominent figures, notably his son Timoti Karetai (d. 1893), a notable tribal leader, and Timoti's daughter-in-law Maaki Karetai (1868–1945), a tireless worker for the people — both Māori and non-Māori — of Otago Peninsula. Karetai's great-granddaughter Louise Magdalene Teowaina Wallscott (1898–1999) was a notable member of the Māori Women's Welfare League.

A road and walking track on Otago Peninsula are named for Karetai, as was a pilot boat belonging to the Port of Otago Authority. Karetai Peak in Fiordland National Park is officially named in his honour.
