= Wera =

Wera may refer to:

== People ==
- Julian Wera (1902–1975), Major League Baseball third baseman
- Wera Engels (1905–1988), German actress
- Wera Hobhouse (born 1960), British politician
- Wera Sæther (born 1945), Norwegian author

== Other ==
- Wera (drug), a brand name of the birth control pill ethinylestradiol/norethisterone acetate
- Wera River, a river of Flores, Indonesia
- Wera Tools, the popular name for German tool manufacturer, Wera Werk Hermann Werner GmbH & Co. KG, of Wuppertal, Germany
- WERA-LP, a low-power radio station (96.7 FM) licensed to serve Arlington, Virginia, United States
- A defunct radio station in Plainfield, New Jersey on 1590 AM
- WERA (Western Eastern Roadracing Association), motorcycle racing sanctioning body

== See also ==
- Te Wera (disambiguation)
