= Magda Wallscott =

Māori leader, teacher and weaver (1898–1999)

Louise Magdalene Teowaina Wallscott (25 December 1898 – 17 February 1999) was a Māori activist, teacher and weaver.

== Early life ==
Magda Wallscott was born at Pipikaretu Beach, Ōtākou, the daughter of Ema Karetai, Kāti Māmoe and Ngāi Tahu, and Frederick Wallscott, a professional soldier from Saxony, Germany. Her great-grandfather was John Karetai, known as Chief Karetai, one of the signatories of the Treaty of Waitangi in 1840. Karetai's mere pounamu Kahutai was passed through the family to Wallscott, who then loaned it to Otago Museum in the 1970s where museum kaitiaki continue to guide its care.

Wallscott attended Te Waipounamu Māori Girls' College in Christchurch, and then in 1918 entered Christchurch Training College and boarded at Bishopscourt Hostel until 1921. Wallscott was taught to weave flax in Taieri by her aunt Ripeka Martin (formerly Karetai). For several years, she taught at small schools in Stewart Island, Bluff, Wyndham, Clifton, Invercargill and Dunedin.

From 1944 to 1948 Wallscott taught at the Ōtākou Native School, and during this time began an active role at the Ōtākou Marae which continued for 30 years. Although Wallscott never married or had children, she raised her niece Iri Wallscott as whāngai, which is a traditional method of open adoption among the Māori people of New Zealand. After retiring from teaching in 1953, Wallscott began a new career in community service that she maintained into her 90s.

== Māori Women's Welfare League ==
Wallscott was a founding member of the Māori Women's Welfare League, and was the Ōtepoti Representative of the league for many years. Other Ōtepoti branch members included Victoria Potiki, Taka Moss, Rumatiki Wright and Jean Robinson. Wallscott made significant contributions to the league over many years. She relished the achievements of the Ōtepoti branch – "We have made our voice heard ... we are listened to ... we have just simply been so sincere that people have taken notice of us." In 1968, Wallscott accepted the McEwen trophy on behalf of the Te Waipounamu branch of the Māori Women's Welfare League, awarded to the area showing the greatest yearly increase in membership.

== Other community work ==
- Foundation member of the Āraiteuru Cultural Club and helped establish its marae in Dunedin
- Ōtākou Marae (secretary)
- Ōtākou Māori Committee
- Ōtākou Māori Executive
- Te Wai Pounamu District Council
- Māori Mission Committee
- Dunedin Branch of National Council of Women
- Old Peoples' Welfare Council
- Board of Directors of YWCA
- In 1960 she became the first Māori women in Dunedin to be a Justice of the Peace.
- In the 1980s Wallscott helped lead opposition to the Aramoana aluminum smelter.

== Notable achievements ==
- In 1976, Wallscott was awarded the Queens Service Medal in the Queen's Birthday honours list for services to the community.
- Wallscott was chosen as one of five people to accompany Te Maori exhibition to San Francisco and attend the opening ceremonies in 1984.
- In 1990 Wallscott received an award from the Māori and South Pacific Arts Council for her contribution to weaving.

== Death and legacy ==
During the early 1990s, Wallscott contributed audio recordings of her local place names to Ngā Ingoa o Aotearoa: An Oral Dictionary of Māori Placenames. In 1999, she donated many of her personal papers and archives to the Hocken Manuscripts and Archives Collection. These included letters from friends and family, papers relating to land issues, the Māori Women's Welfare League, appointment diaries, notebooks, music and songs.

Wallscott died on 17 February 1999, two months after her 100th birthday At the time of her death, Wallscott was the oldest surviving member on Ngāi Tahu's tribal roll.
