= Mount Madeline =

Mountain in New Zealand

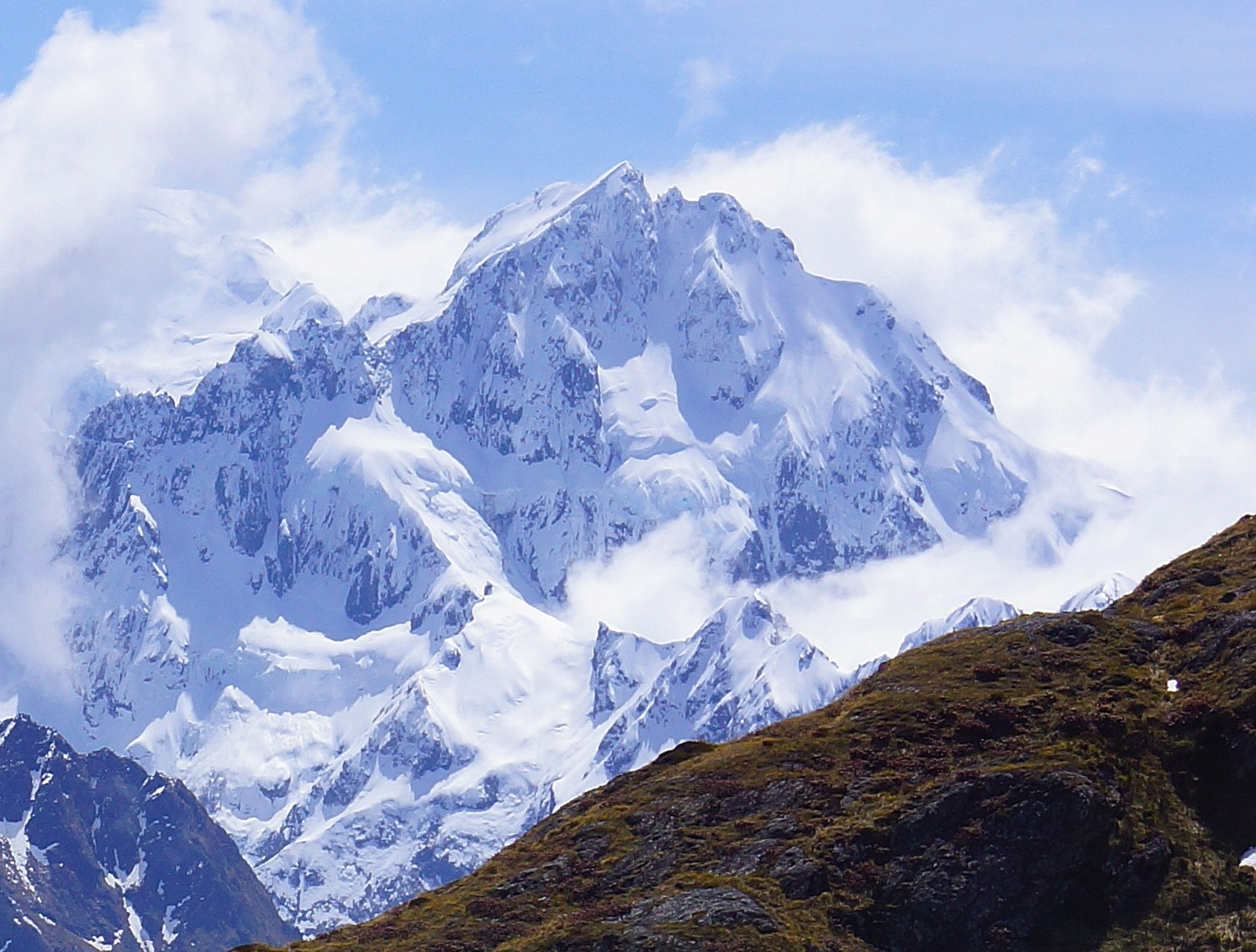
- Southeast aspect

Highest point
- Elevation: 2,536 m (8,320 ft)
- Prominence: 543 m (1,781 ft)
- Parent peak: Mount Tūtoko
- Isolation: 2.87 km (1.78 mi)
- Listing: New Zealand #62
- Coordinates: 44°36′51″S 168°02′45″E

Geography
- Location within New Zealand
- Interactive map of Mount Madeline
- Location: South Island
- Country: New Zealand
- Region: Southland
- Protected area: Fiordland National Park
- Parent range: Darran Mountains
- Topo map(s): NZMS260 D40; Topo50 CA09

Geology
- Rock age: 136 ± 1.9 Ma
- Rock type(s): Gabbronorite, dioritic orthogneiss

Climbing
- First ascent: 1920

Mount Madeline is a 2,536-metre-elevation (8,320-foot) mountain in Fiordland, New Zealand.

== Description ==
Mount Madeline is the second-highest peak of the Darran Mountains. It is situated in the Southland Region of South Island, and set within Fiordland National Park which is part of the Te Wahipounamu UNESCO World Heritage Site. Precipitation runoff from the mountain drains west to the Tūtoko River via Leader Creek, and east to the Hollyford River via Madeline, Cleft, and Glacier creeks. Topographic relief is significant as the summit rises 2,500 metres (8,202 feet) above the Hollyford Valley in four kilometres and 2,100 metres (6,890 feet) above the Tūtoko Valley in four kilometres.

== History ==
In 1895, Malcolm Ross, Kenneth Ross, W.J. Hodgkin, and Tom Fyfe climbed the lower west peak (2,516 m) of Madeline. The first ascent of the true summit was made in March 1920 by Alf Cowling and Samuel Turner. The mountain was named in 1921 after Samuel Turner's daughter, Madeline.

== Climate ==
Based on the Köppen climate classification, Mount Madeline is located in a marine west coast climate zone, with a subpolar oceanic climate (Cfc) at the summit. Prevailing westerly winds blow moist air from the Tasman Sea onto the mountain, where the air is forced upward by the mountains (orographic lift), causing moisture to drop in the form of rain and snow. This climate supports unnamed glaciers on the peak's slopes. The months of December through February offer the most favourable weather for viewing or climbing this peak.

== Climbing ==
Climbing routes with the first ascents:

- South West Face – Samuel Turner, Alf Cowling – (1920)
- North East Ridge from Glacier Creek – R. Offer, G. Mason, A. Witten-Hannah – (1953)
- North West Buttress – Margaret Clark, Jim Clark, G.D. Cowie – (1958)
- North East Ridge – Ian Brown, Tom Williams – (2009)
- Mad Line – Steve Skelton, Justin Venable, Simon Rutherford – (2016)

== Gallery ==
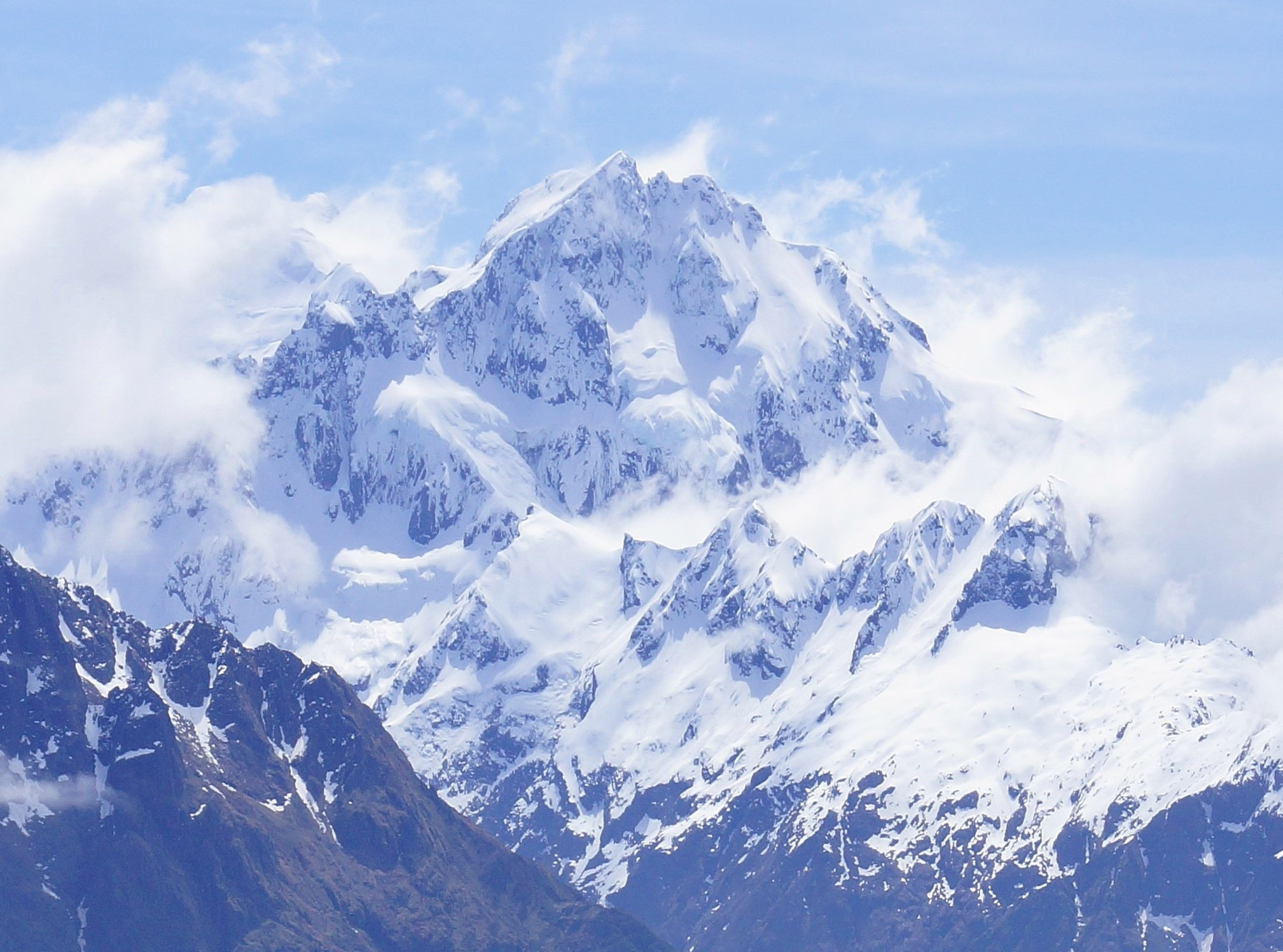
Southeast aspect

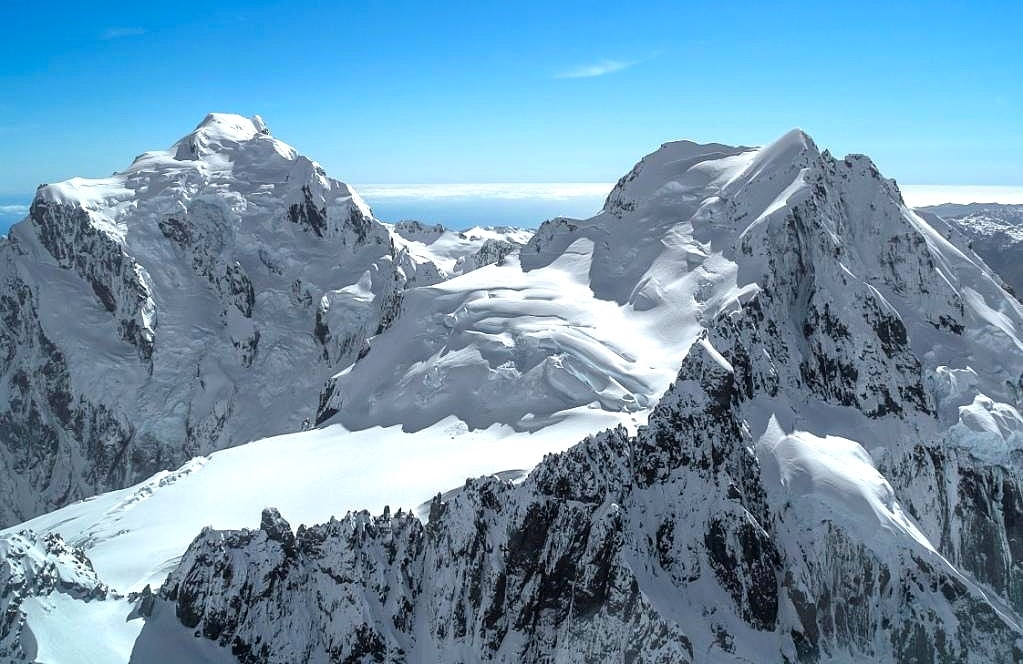
Aerial view of Mount Tūtoko (left) and Mount Madeline (right)

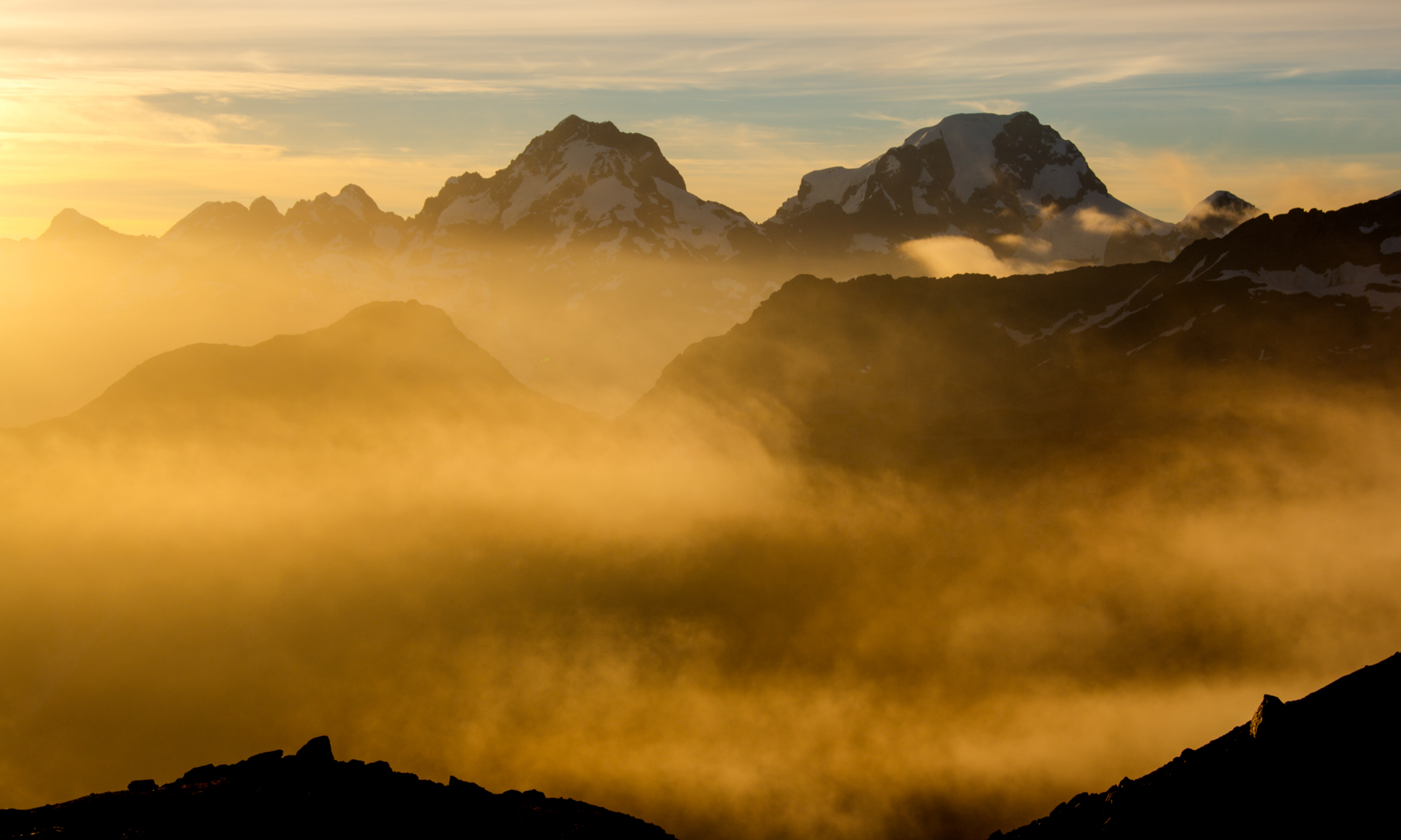
Mount Madeleine (left) and Mount Tūtoko (right) are the two highest peaks of the Darran Mountains. Viewed from east.

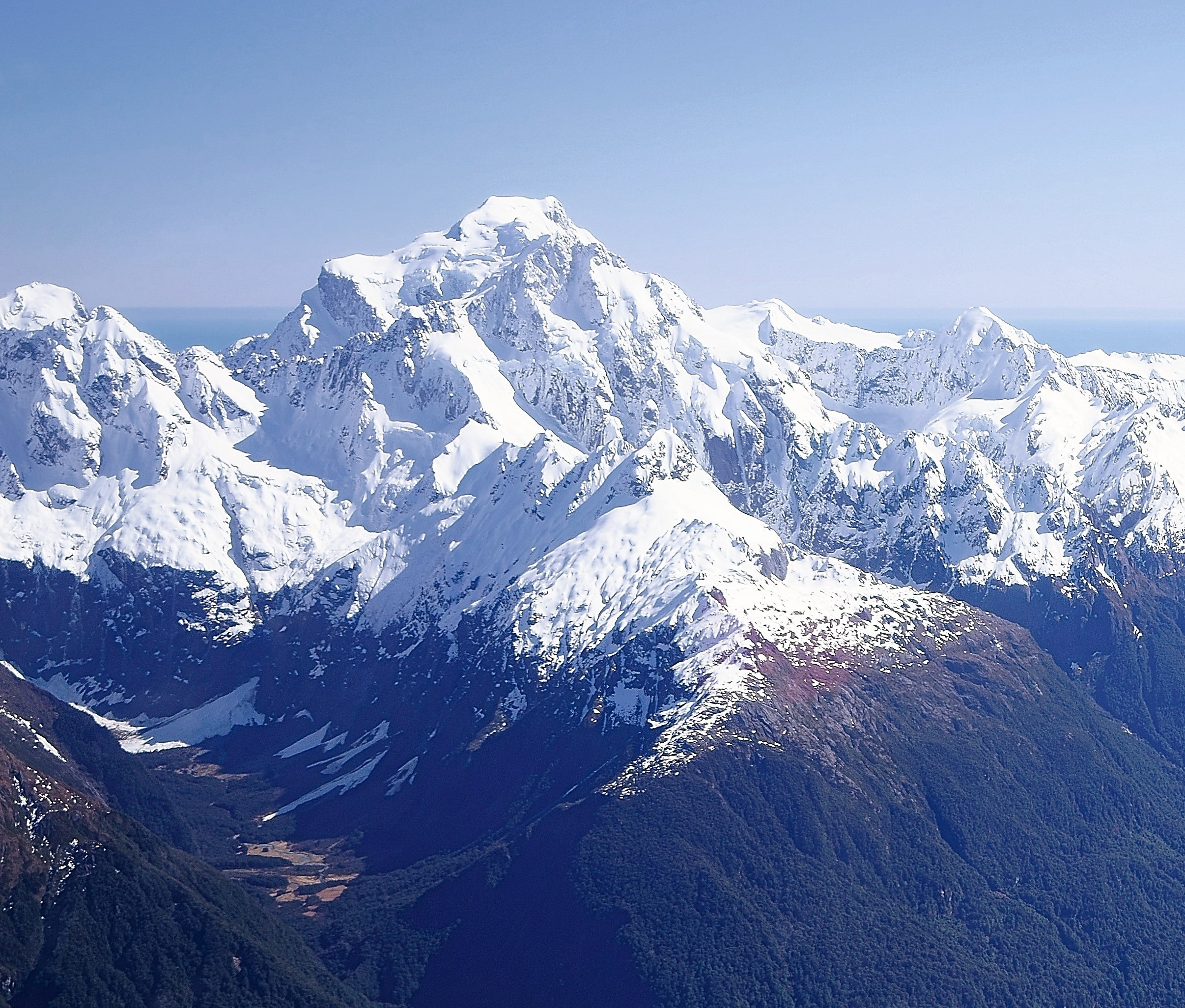
Aerial view of Mount Madeline in front of Mount Tūtoko, lined up together from southeast.

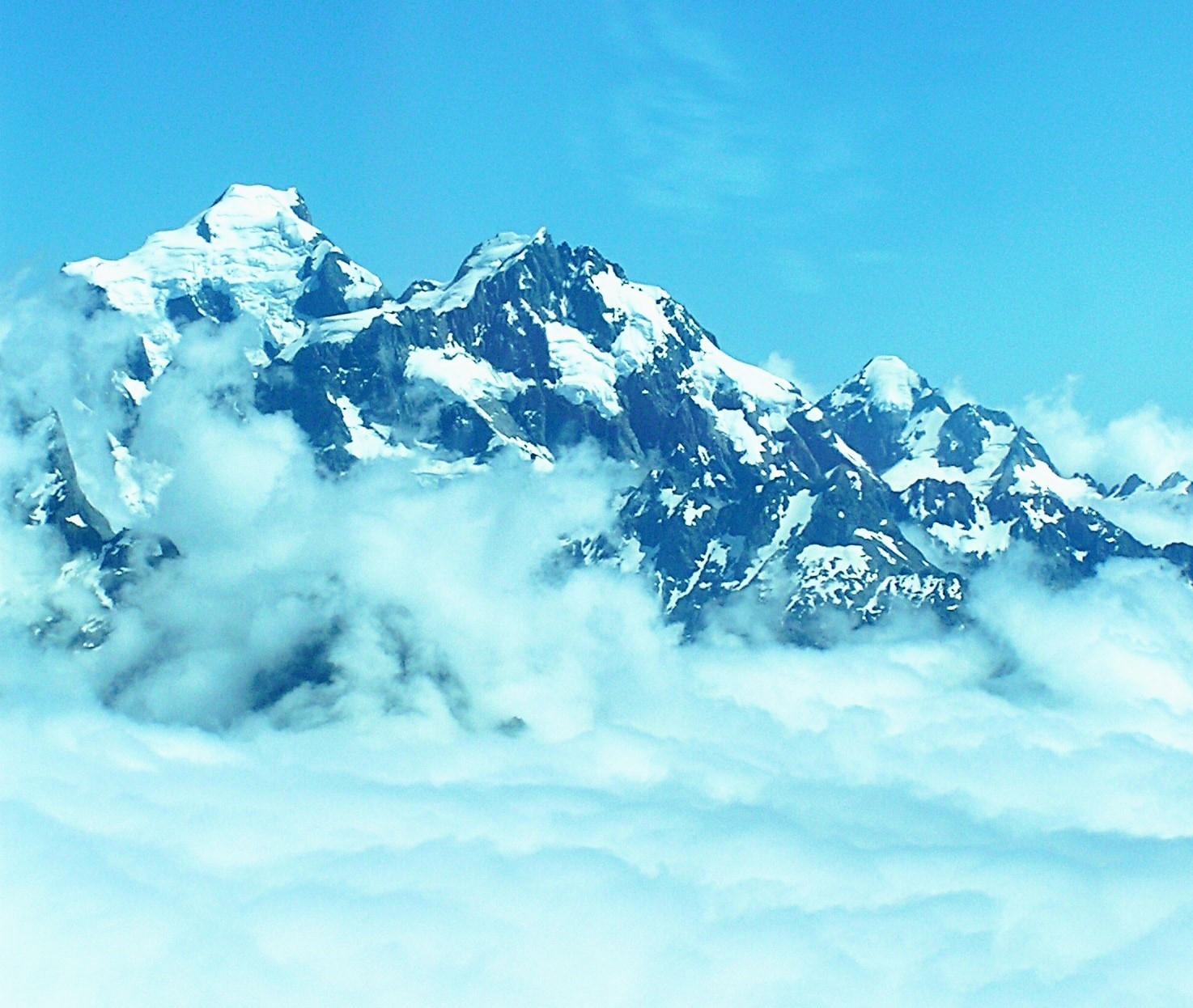
Mount Tūtoko (left), Mount Madeline (center), Alice Peak (right) aerial view. Camera pointed northwest.

== See also ==
- List of mountains of New Zealand by height
- Fiordland
