= Bowen Falls =

Waterfall in New Zealand

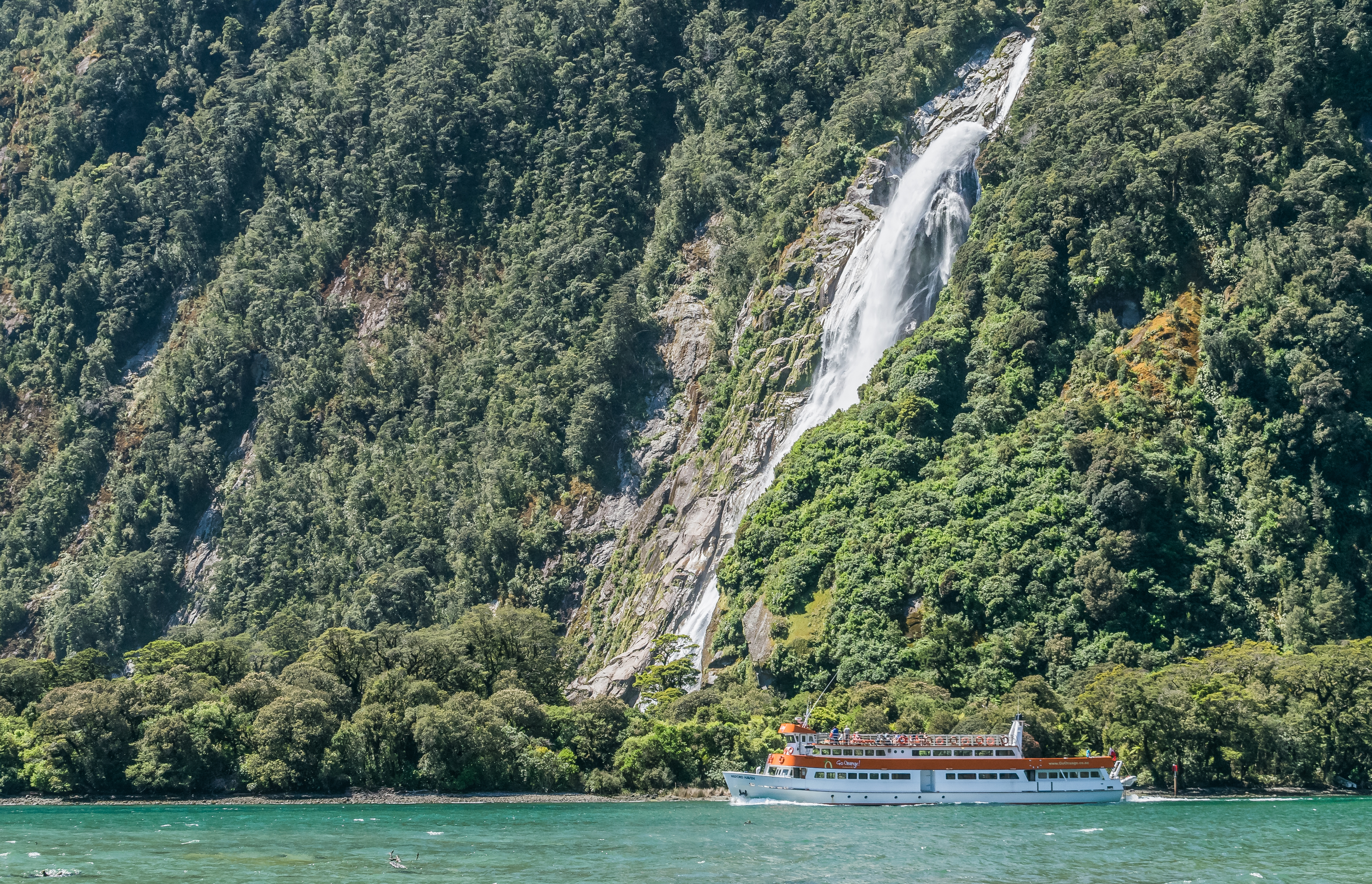
Bowen Falls

The Bowen Falls (Māori: Hineteawa), also known as Lady Bowen Falls, is a popular tourist attraction at Milford Sound, a fiord in New Zealand.

The 9-kilometre (5.6 mi) long Bowen River located in Fiordland National Park supplies the waterfall with water; the Bowen River is also used to generate electricity and supply drinking water to the nearby locality also named Milford Sound. Bowen Falls is one of just two permanent waterfalls that discharge into the fiord, and, at 162 metres (531 ft), it is the tallest. The river and waterfalls were named for Diamantina Bowen (Lady Bowen), the wife of the fifth governor of New Zealand, George Bowen. The governor visited Milford Sound aboard HMS Clio in 1871 and Bowen Falls was named to mark the occasion.

The track from the Milford Sound wharf to Bowen Falls closed in 2002 after a rock face had become unstable. The waterfall was inaccessible for 15 years and could only be visited by boat. On 29 January 2018, a short on-demand boat service (120 metres or 390 feet long) was initiated that overcomes the unstable section. The round trip from Milford Sound wharf to Bowen Falls takes half an hour including the two boat trips.

== See also ==
- List of waterfalls
- List of waterfalls in New Zealand
