= Kaipo River (Fiordland) =

- Route of the Kaipo River
- Mouth of the Kaipo River Kaipo River (Fiordland) (South Island) Kaipo River (Fiordland) (New Zealand)
- Native name: Kaikākāpō

Location
- Country: New Zealand

Physical characteristics
- Source
  - coordinates: 44°33′22″S 167°59′34″E
- Mouth
  - location: Kaipo Bay
  - coordinates: 44°24′24″S 167°54′55″E
  - elevation: 0 m (0 ft)

Basin features
- Progression: Kaipo River → Kaipo Bay → Tasman Sea

The Kaipo River is a river of New Zealand, flowing into Kaipo Bay, northern Fiordland. Fly fishing is a popular sport on the river.

The New Zealand Ministry for Culture and Heritage gives a translation of "eat night" for Kaipō.

== See also ==
- List of rivers of New Zealand
