= Mount Crosscut =

Mountain in Fiordland, New Zealand

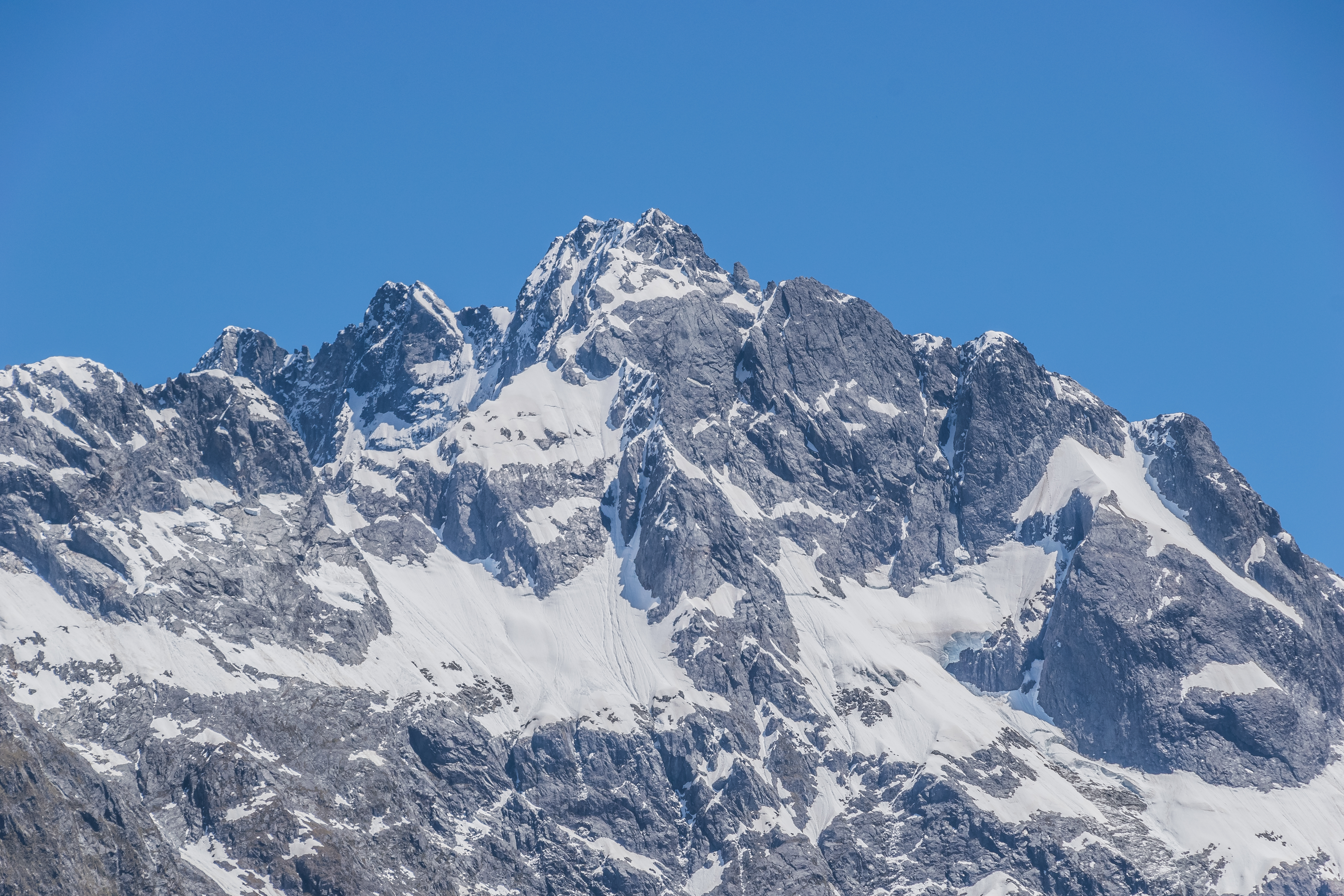
- Southeast aspect

Highest point
- Elevation: 2,263 m (7,425 ft)
- Prominence: 363 m (1,191 ft)
- Isolation: 3.1 km (1.9 mi)
- Coordinates: 44°45′57″S 168°02′26″E

Naming
- Etymology: Crosscut saw

Geography
- Location within New Zealand
- Interactive map of Mount Crosscut
- Location: South Island
- Country: New Zealand
- Region: Southland
- Protected area: Fiordland National Park
- Parent range: Darran Mountains
- Topo map(s): NZMS260 D40; Topo50 CB09

Geology
- Rock age: 136 ± 1.9 Ma
- Rock type(s): Gabbronorite, dioritic orthogneiss

Climbing
- First ascent: 1936

Mount Crosscut is a 2,263-metre-elevation (7,425-foot) mountain in Fiordland, New Zealand.

== Description ==
Mount Crosscut is part of the Darran Mountains and is situated in the Southland Region of South Island. It is set within Fiordland National Park which is part of the Te Wahipounamu UNESCO World Heritage Site. Precipitation runoff from the mountain drains into tributaries of the Hollyford River. Topographic relief is significant as the summit rises 1,570 metres (5,151 feet) above Lake Marian in 2.5 kilometres and 1,060 metres (3,478 feet) above Cirque Creek in one kilometre. The nearest higher peak is Mount Christina, three kilometres to the south-southeast. The mountain was named in 1924 by Dr. D. Jennings on account that the jagged peaks resemble the teeth of the crosscut saw that his party of students was using for clearing tracks. The first ascent of the summit was made in 1936 by T.N. Beckett, Gordon Speden, Hallum Smith, and E. Rich.

== Climbing ==
Climbing routes on Mount Crosscut:

- East Peak (2,263 m)
  - Original Line – T.N. Beckett, Gordon Speden, Hallum Smith, E. Rich – (1936)
  - South East Ridge – Bill Gordon, Ralph Miller, Bill Blee – (1955)
- Second Peak (2,252 m)
  - Original Route – Bill Gordon, Jim McFarlane, Lloyd Warburton, Duncan Wilson – (1953)
- Middle Peak (2,250 m)
  - Original Line – Bart Challis, Lindsay Stewart – (1934)
  - Dislocation Arête – Athol Abrams, Chuck Schaap, Jon Waugh – (1968)
- West Peak (2,203 m)
  - West Ridge – George Moir, Ken Roberts, Bob Sinclair – (1923)
  - Lindsay Stewart Buttress – Lindsay Stewart, Don Stewart, Harold Jacobs – (1967)
  - Cul de Sac – Geoff Gabites, Nigel Perry, Duncan Ritchie, Calum Hudson – (1982)
  - The Wrongest Day – Tom Williams, Ian Brown – (2012)
- Crosscut Traverse (all four peaks) – Austin Brookes, Archie Simpson – (1963 or 1964)

== Climate ==
Based on the Köppen climate classification, Mount Crosscut is located in a marine west coast climate zone. Prevailing westerly winds blow moist air from the Tasman Sea onto the mountain, where the air is forced upward by the mountains (orographic lift), causing moisture to drop in the form of rain and snow. This climate supports small unnamed glaciers on the slopes. The months of December through February offer the most favourable weather for viewing or climbing this peak.

== See also ==
- List of mountains of New Zealand by height
- Fiordland
