= Bowen River (New Zealand) =

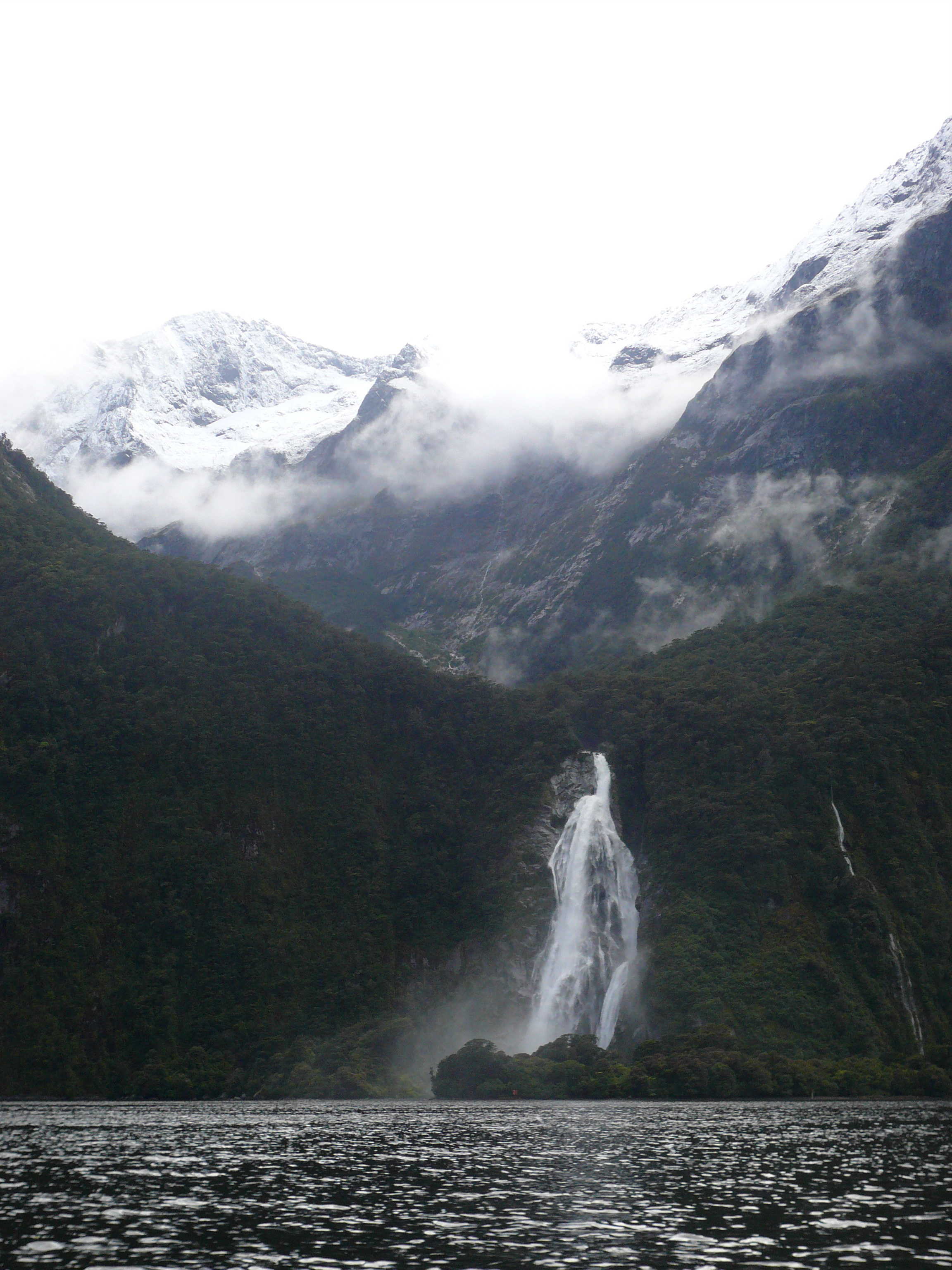
- Bowen River flowing over the Lady Bowen Falls into Milford Sound
- Route of the Bowen River
- Mouth of the Bowen River Bowen River (New Zealand) (South Island) Bowen River (New Zealand) (New Zealand)
- Etymology: in honour of George Bowen and Diamantina Bowen

Location
- Country: New Zealand
- Region: Southland
- District: Southland

Physical characteristics
- Source: Darran Mountains
  - coordinates: 44°35′30″S 167°56′06″E
- Mouth
  - location: Milford Sound
  - coordinates: 44°39′56″S 167°55′24″E
  - elevation: 0 metres (0 ft)
- Length: 9 km (5.6 mi)

Basin features
- Progression: Bowen River → Milford Sound → Tasman Sea

The Bowen River is a river in northern Fiordland, New Zealand. The river originates near Mount Grave and is joined by many small streams on its way south through the valley. After close to 9 kilometres (6 mi), the river plunges from the hanging valley over the 162-metre (531 ft) Lady Bowen Falls and drains into the head of Milford Sound. The falls are named for Diamantina Bowen, wife of George Bowen, the fifth Governor of New Zealand.

As one of only two permanent waterfalls in Milford Sound, the falls provide electricity for the Milford Sound settlement by feeding a small hydroelectric scheme, and are also the water source for the settlement.

A track leading to the base of the falls was closed in 2003 due to rock falls and instability, but was partly re-opened in 2018 with the first section of the track now replaced by a short ride in a small boat from the Freshwater Basin Terminal in Milford.

== See also ==
- List of rivers of New Zealand
