= Te Wera Peak =

Mountain in Fiordland, New Zealand

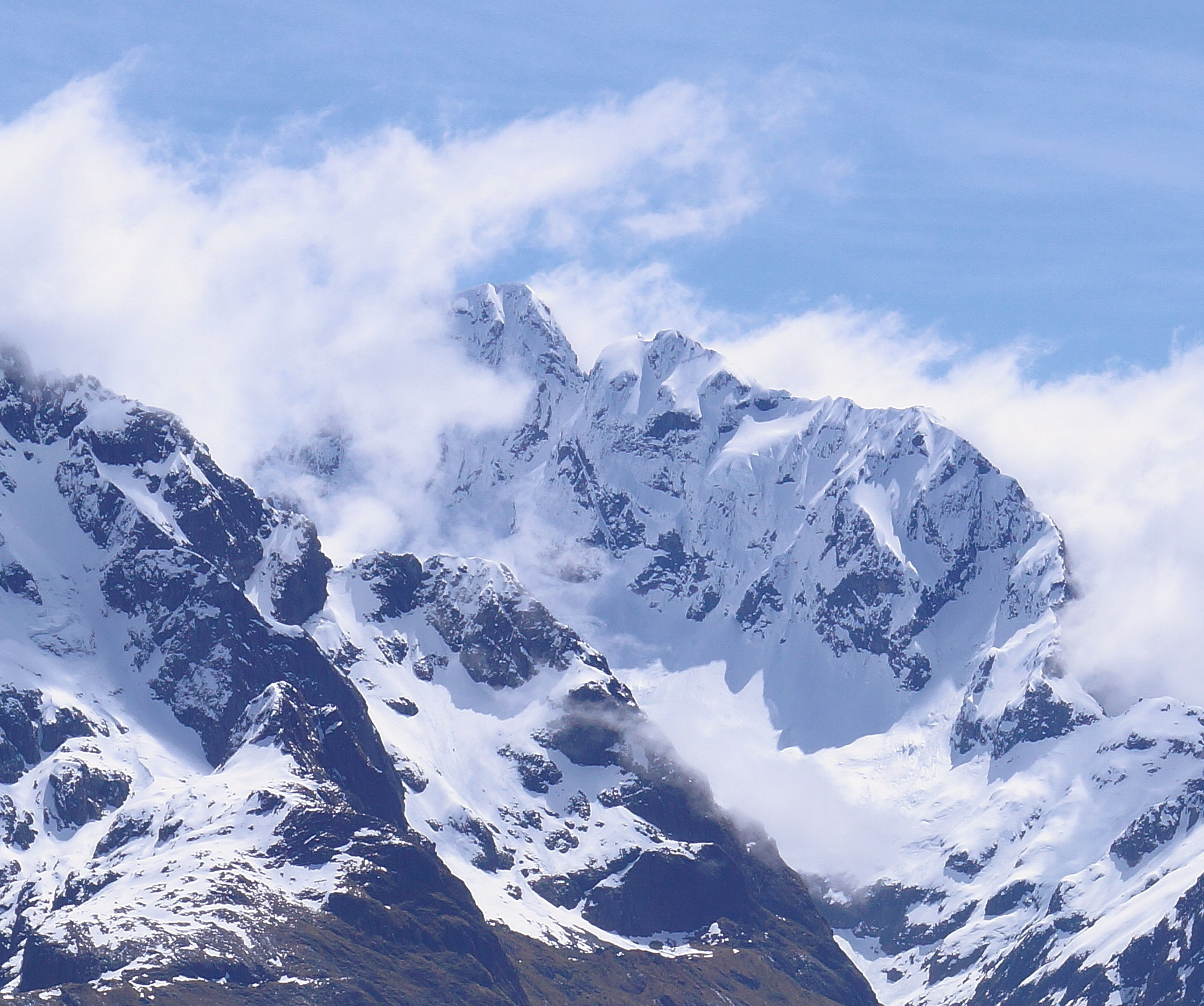
- Southeast aspect

Highest point
- Elevation: 2,309 m (7,575 ft)
- Prominence: 532 m (1,745 ft)
- Isolation: 4.96 km (3.08 mi)
- Coordinates: 44°39′30″S 168°03′15″E

Geography
- Location within New Zealand
- Interactive map of Te Wera Peak
- Location: South Island
- Country: New Zealand
- Region: Southland
- Protected area: Fiordland National Park
- Parent range: Darran Mountains
- Topo map: NZTopo50 CB09

Geology
- Rock age: 136 ± 1.9 Ma
- Rock type(s): Gabbronorite, dioritic orthogneiss

Climbing
- First ascent: 1938

Te Wera Peak, also known as Mount Te Wera, is a 2,309-metre-elevation (7,575-foot) mountain in Fiordland, New Zealand.

== Description ==
Te Wera Peak is the fourth-highest peak of the Darran Mountains. It is situated in the Southland Region of the South Island, and set within Fiordland National Park which is part of the Te Wahipounamu UNESCO World Heritage Site. Precipitation runoff from the mountain drains into Cleft Creek and Chasm Creek which are tributaries of the Hollyford River. Topographic relief is significant as the summit rises 2,250 metres (7,382 feet) above the Hollyford Valley in four kilometres, and 1,700 metres (5,577 feet) above Cleft Creek in two kilometres. The nearest higher neighbour is Mount Madeline, five kilometres to the north. The first ascent of the summit was made in 1938 by David Lewis and Lindsay Stewart. This mountain's toponym has been officially approved as Te Wera Peak by the New Zealand Geographic Board. "Te Wera" is a Māori term meaning "the burning" or "the heat."

== Climate ==
Based on the Köppen climate classification, Te Wera Peak is located in a marine west coast climate zone, with a subpolar oceanic climate (Cfc) at the summit. Prevailing westerly winds blow moist air from the Tasman Sea onto the mountain, where the air is forced upwards by the mountains (orographic lift), causing moisture to drop in the form of rain and snow. This climate supports the Te Puoho Glacier on the peak's south slope. The months of December through February offer the most favourable weather for viewing or climbing this peak.

== Climbing ==
Climbing routes with the first ascents:

- North Ridge – David Lewis, Lindsay Stewart – (1938)
- East Ridge – Phil Houghton, Mike Gill – (1959)
- South Ridge (descent) – Phil Houghton, Mike Gill – (1959)
- West Ridge – Harold Jacobs, Murray Jones – (1969)
- South East Face – Harold Jacobs, Murray Jones – (1969)
- South West Face – Harold Jacobs, Ralph Miller – (1970)

== See also ==
- List of mountains of New Zealand by height
