= Mount Tūtoko =

Mountain in Fiordland National Park, New Zealand

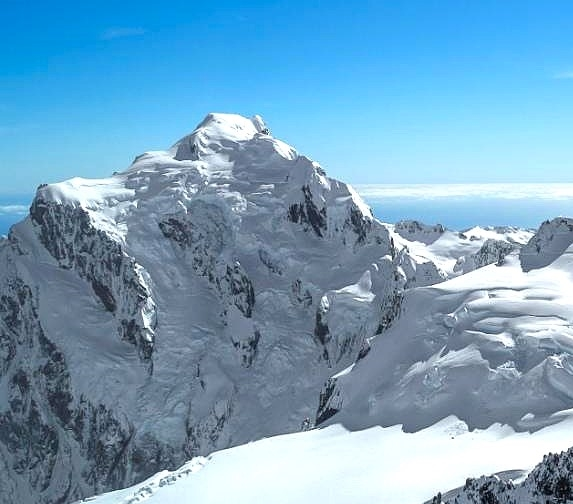

Highest point
- Elevation: 2,723 m (8,934 ft)
- Prominence: 2,191 m (7,188 ft)
- Listing: Ultra; New Zealand #23
- Coordinates: 44°35′33″S 168°00′45″E

Geography
- Location within New Zealand
- Location: South Island, New Zealand
- Parent range: Darran Mountains

Climbing
- First ascent: Turner and Graham, 1924

Mount Tūtoko is the highest peak in Fiordland National Park, in southwest New Zealand. It lies between the Hollyford Valley and Milford Sound, 15 kilometres (9.3 mi) due north of the Homer Tunnel at the northern end of the Darran Mountains. The glacier-covered mountain rises to a height of 2,723 metres (8,934 ft) and is visible from the Hollyford Track. Two slightly lower summits lie just to the south of the main peak.

The first ascent of Tūtoko was by Samuel Turner and Peter Graham in 1924, climbing by way of the northwest ridge.

The mountain was named by James Hector, who visited the area in 1863, after Tūtoko, a Māori chief (rangatira) living at Martins Bay, close to the mouth of the Hollyford River, at the time. The name of the mountain was officially gazetted as Mount Tūtoko on 21 June 2019.

== Gallery ==
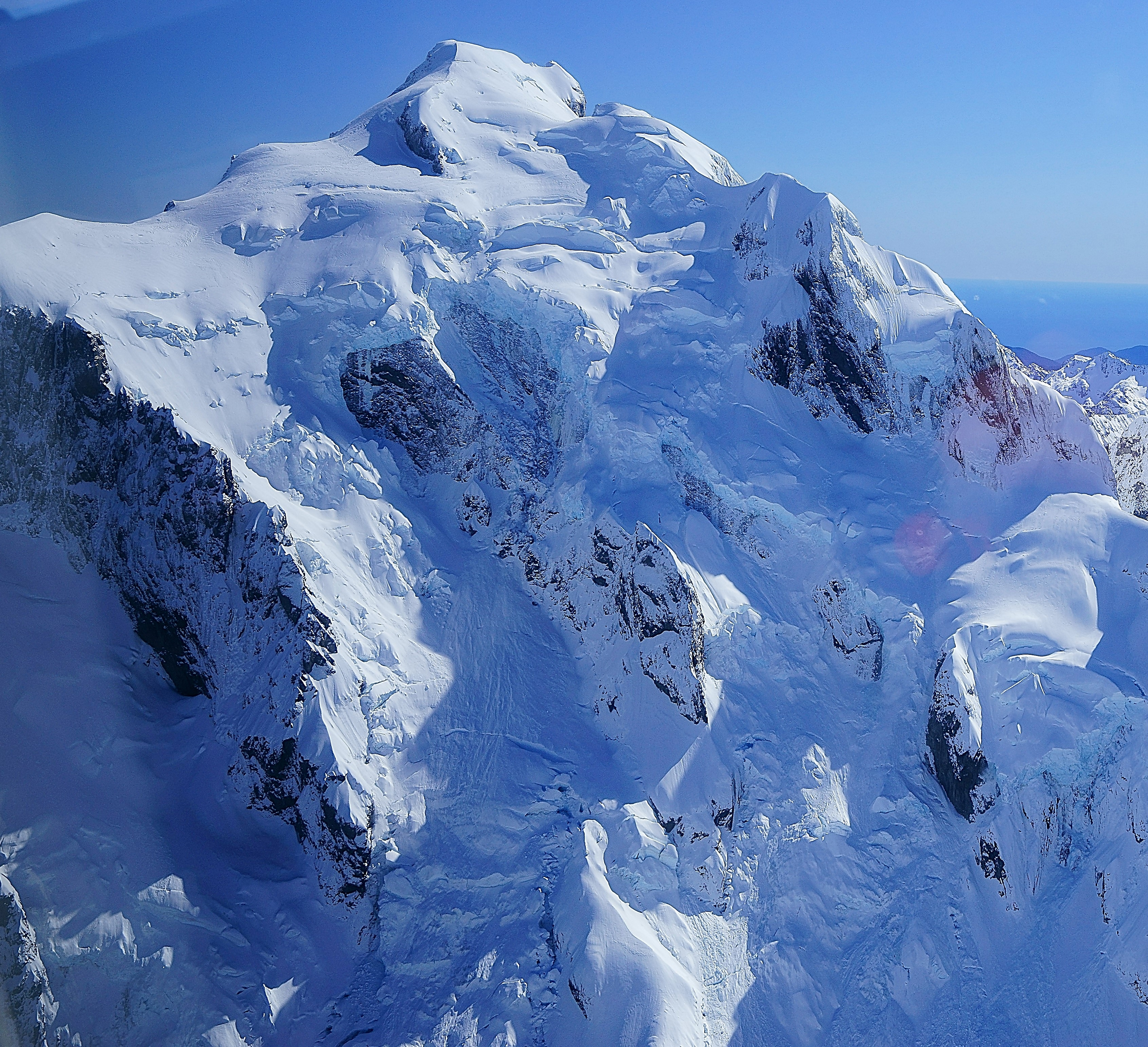
Aerial view of south aspect of Mount Tūtoko

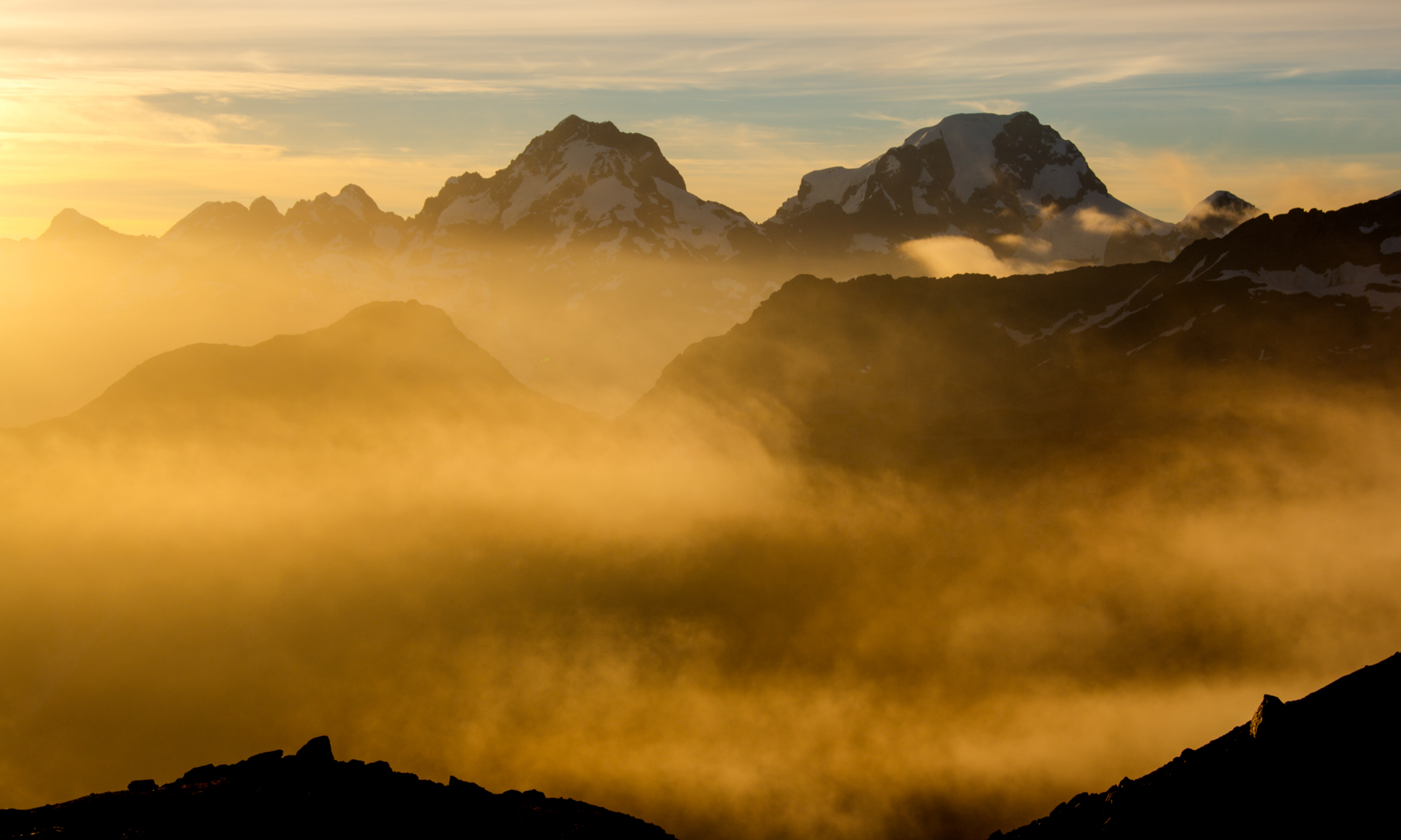
Mount Madeline (left of centre) and Mount Tūtoko (right) are the two highest peaks of the Darran Mountains in New Zealand. Viewed from east.

== See also ==
- List of ultras of Oceania
