= Mount Pembroke =

Mountain in Fiordland, New Zealand

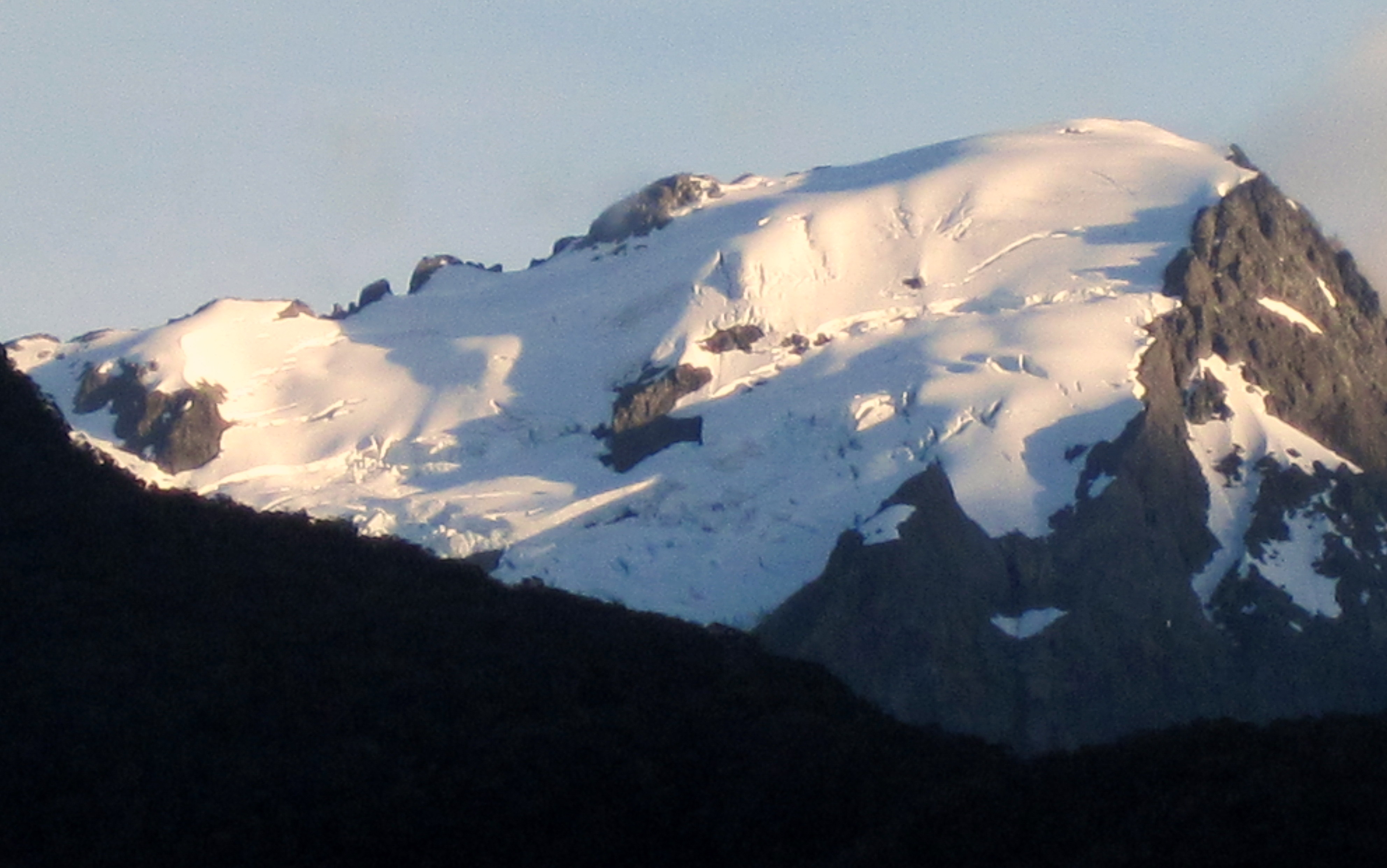
- South aspect

Highest point
- Elevation: 2,015 m (6,611 ft)
- Prominence: 786 m (2,579 ft)
- Isolation: 5.83 km (3.62 mi)
- Coordinates: 44°34′04″S 167°53′08″E

Naming
- Etymology: Pembroke Castle
- Native name: Puhipuhi-takiwai (Māori)

Geography
- Location within New Zealand
- Interactive map of Mount Pembroke
- Location: South Island
- Country: New Zealand
- Region: Southland
- Protected area: Fiordland National Park
- Parent range: Darran Mountains
- Topo map(s): NZMS260 D40; NZTopo50 CA08

Climbing
- First ascent: 1913

Mount Pembroke is a 2,015-metre-elevation (6,611-foot) mountain in Fiordland, New Zealand.

== Description ==
Mount Pembroke is part of the Darran Mountains and is situated in the Southland Region of South Island. It is set north of Milford Sound within Fiordland National Park which is part of the Te Wahipounamu UNESCO World Heritage Site. Precipitation runoff from the mountain drains east into tributaries of the Harrison River, west into headwaters of Thurso River, and north to John o'Groats River. Topographic relief is significant as the summit rises over 1,700 metres (5,577 feet) above the Harrison River in two kilometres, and tidewater of the Tasman Sea is only four kilometres away. The mountain was named in 1851 by John Lort Stokes of the HMS Acheron after Pembroke Castle in Wales. The first ascent of the summit was made in 1913 by Jack Lippe, Bill Grave, and Arthur Talbot.

== Climbing ==
Climbing routes on Mount Pembroke:

- Lippe Couloir – Bill Grave, Arthur Talbot, Jack Lippe – (1913)
- East Ridge – Brian Wilkins, Graham Ellis, Davison, Sherwood – (1956)
- Dale Point Ridge – Jack Ede, Brian Fineran, Colin Benton, Ron Chapman – (1961)
- South Face – Ray Slater, Murray Bolt – (1974)
- Thurso Creek – Jack Murrell, Bev Noble – (1978)
- North Ridge – Grant Dixon, Ian Brown – (2016)

== Climate ==
Based on the Köppen climate classification, Mount Pembroke is located in a marine west coast climate zone. Prevailing westerly winds blow moist air from the Tasman Sea onto the mountain, where the air is forced upward by the mountains (orographic lift), causing moisture to drop in the form of rain and snow. This climate supports the Pembroke Glacier on the south slope. This glacier is the remnant of the ancient ice sheet that carved Milford Sound. The months of December through February offer the most favourable weather for viewing or climbing this peak.

== See also ==
- List of mountains of New Zealand by height
- Fiordland

== Gallery ==
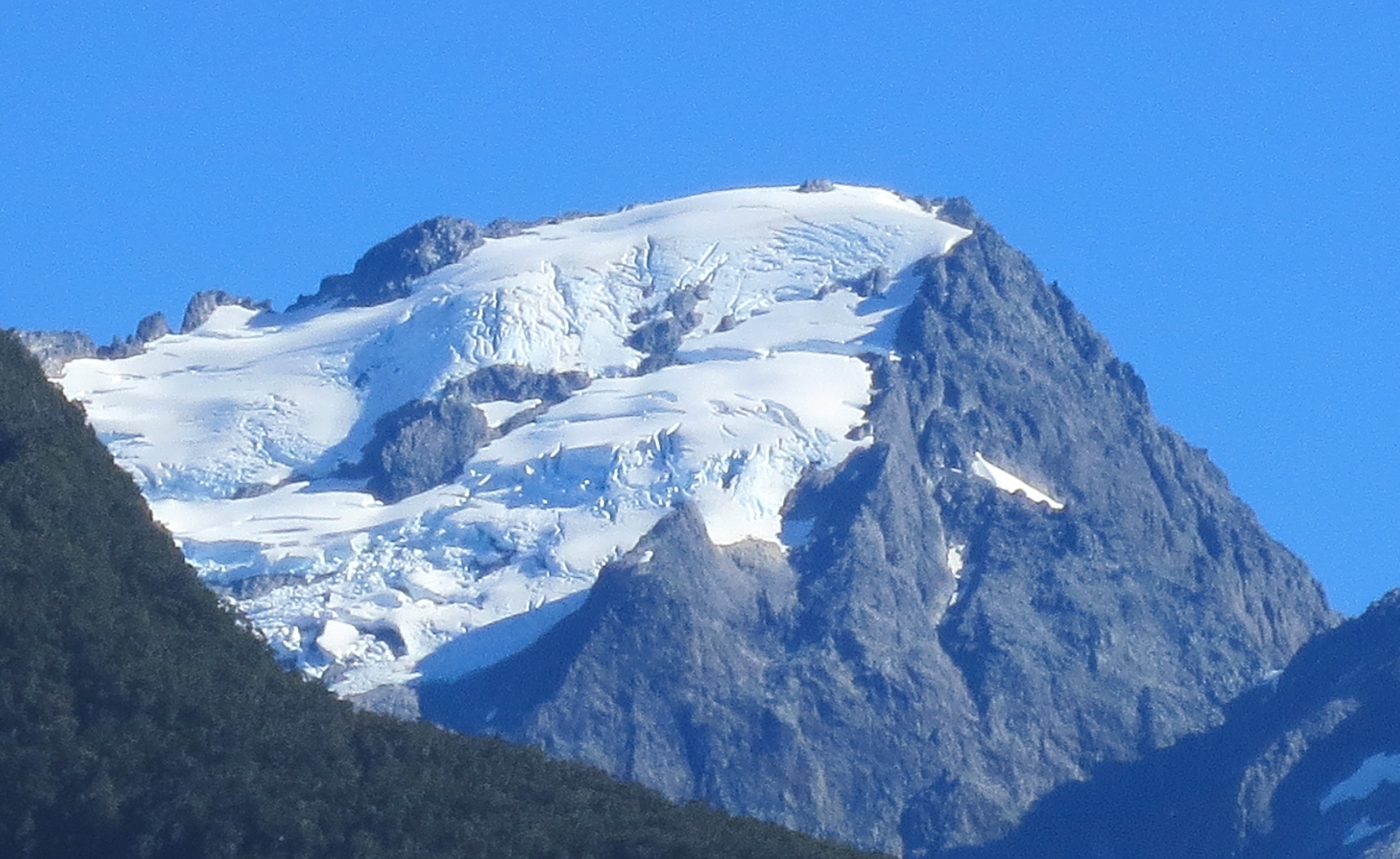
South aspect of Mount Pembroke featuring Pembroke Glacier

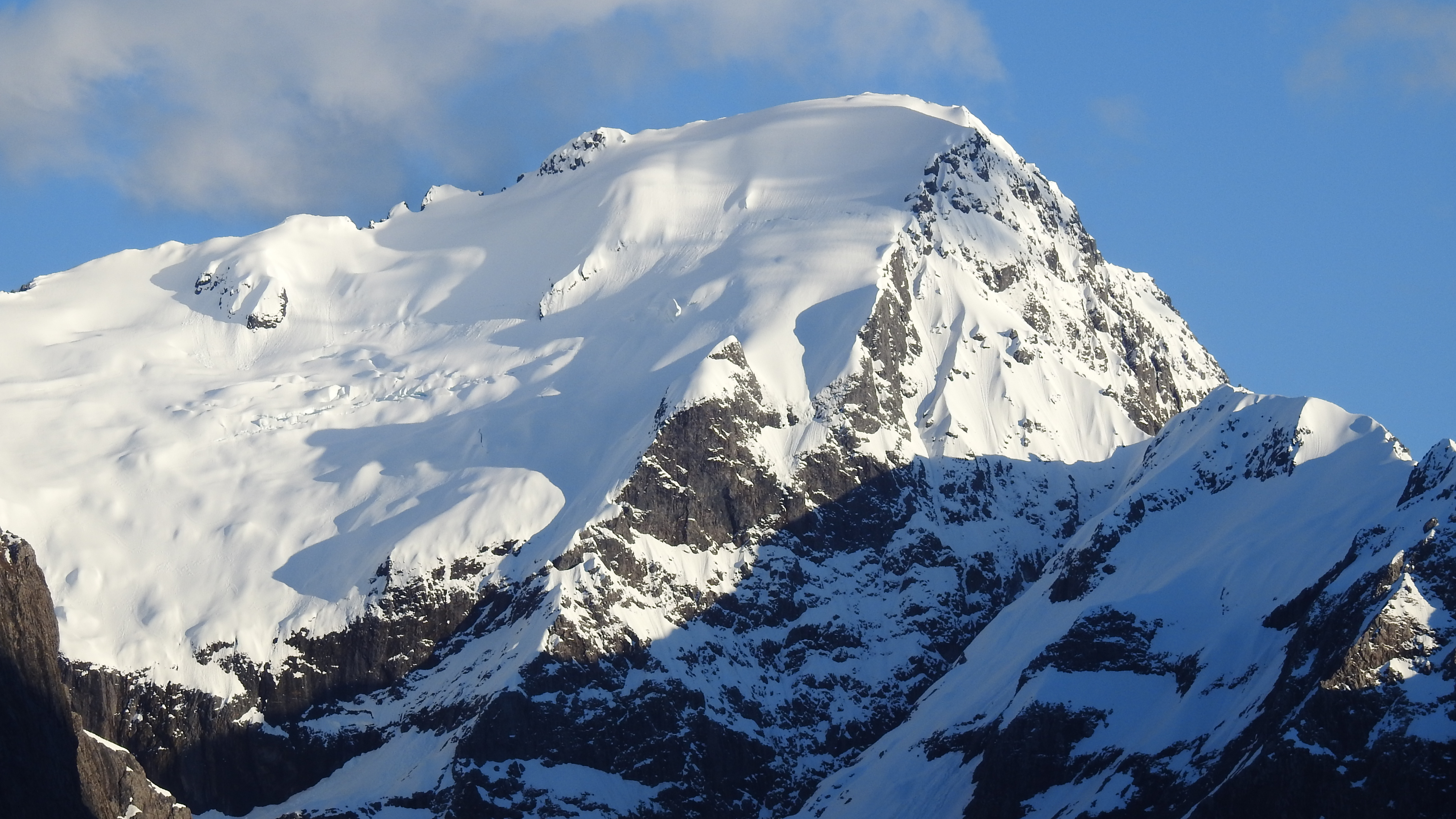
South aspect

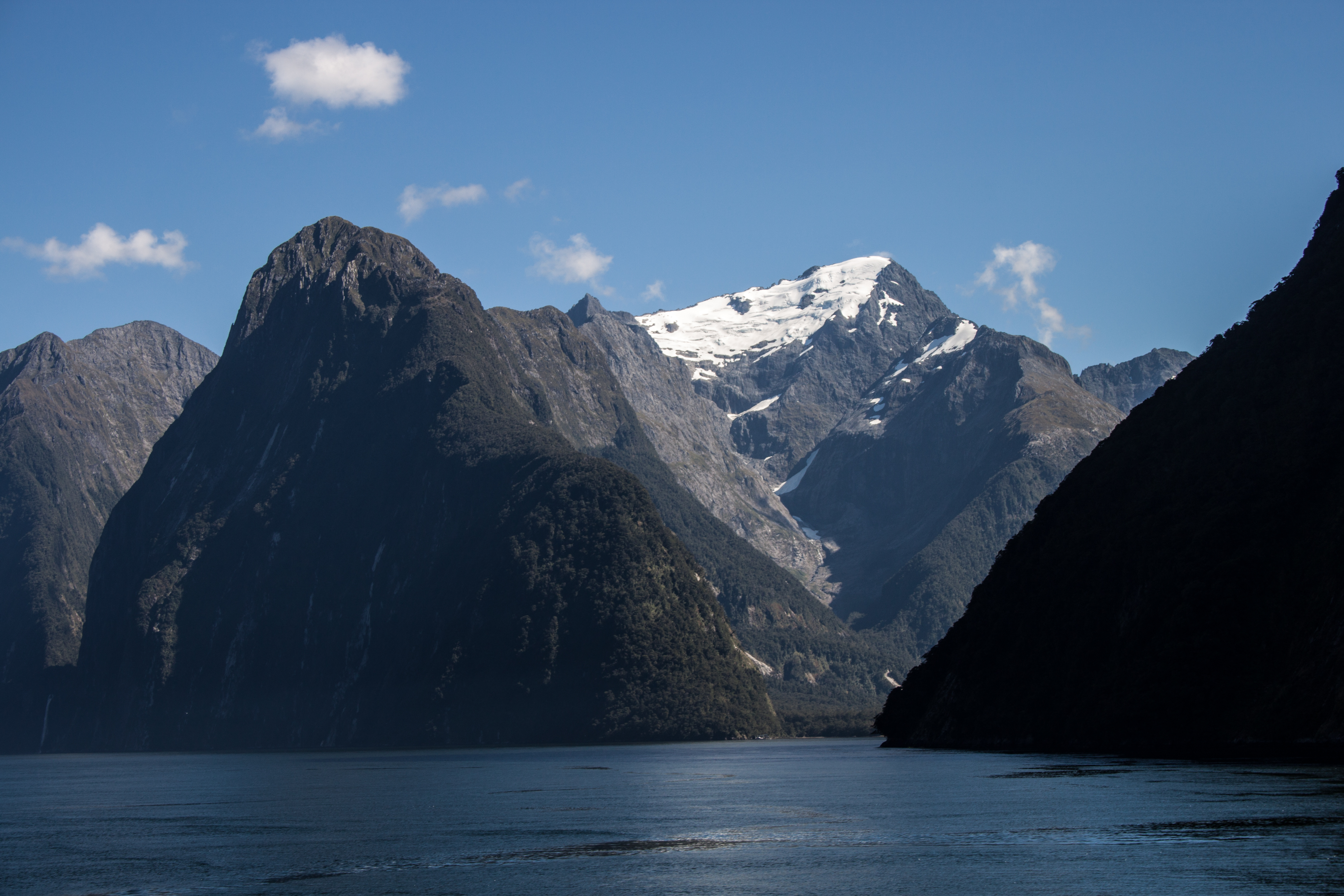
The Lion (left) and Mount Pembroke

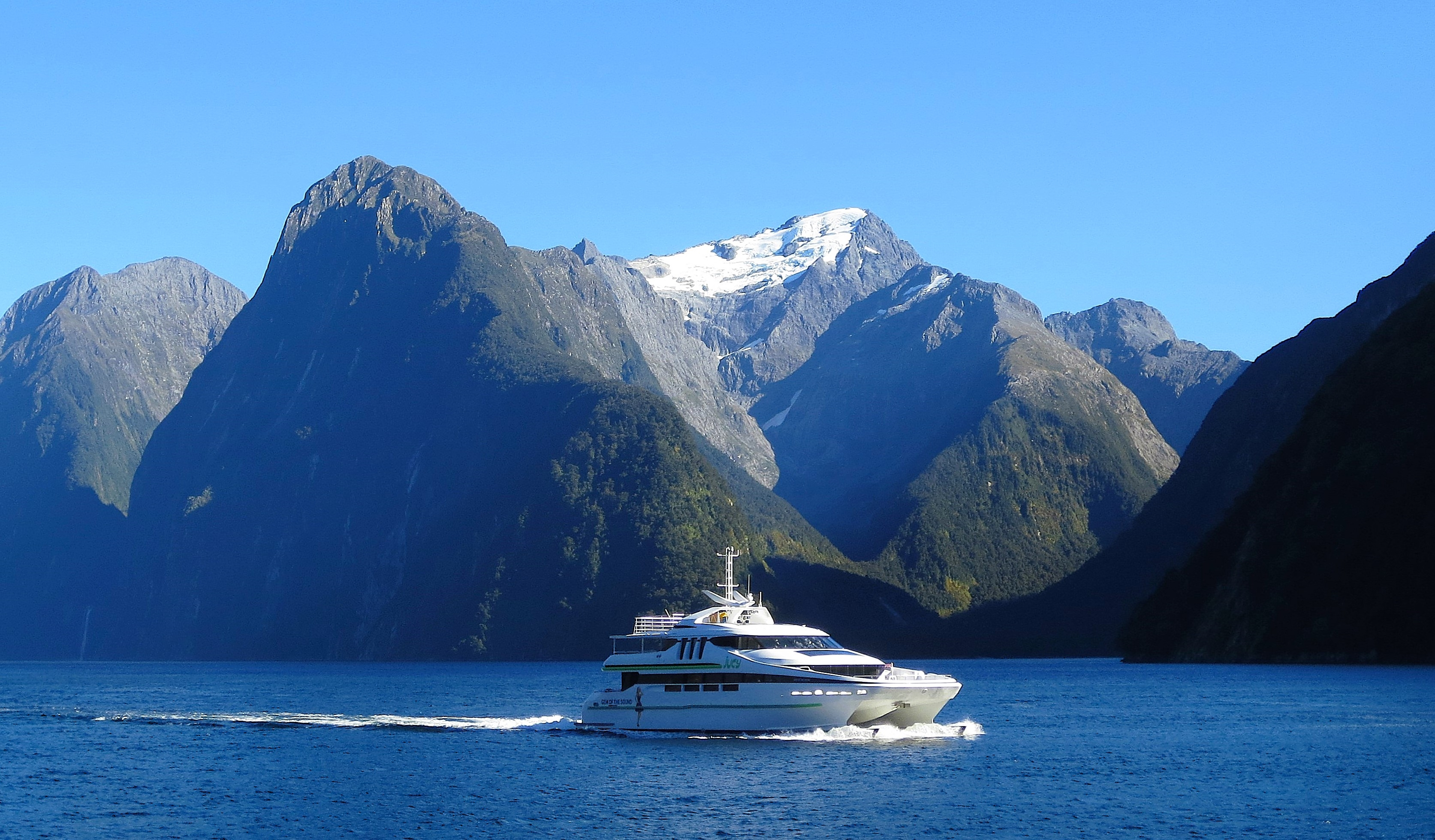
The Lion (left) and Mount Pembroke

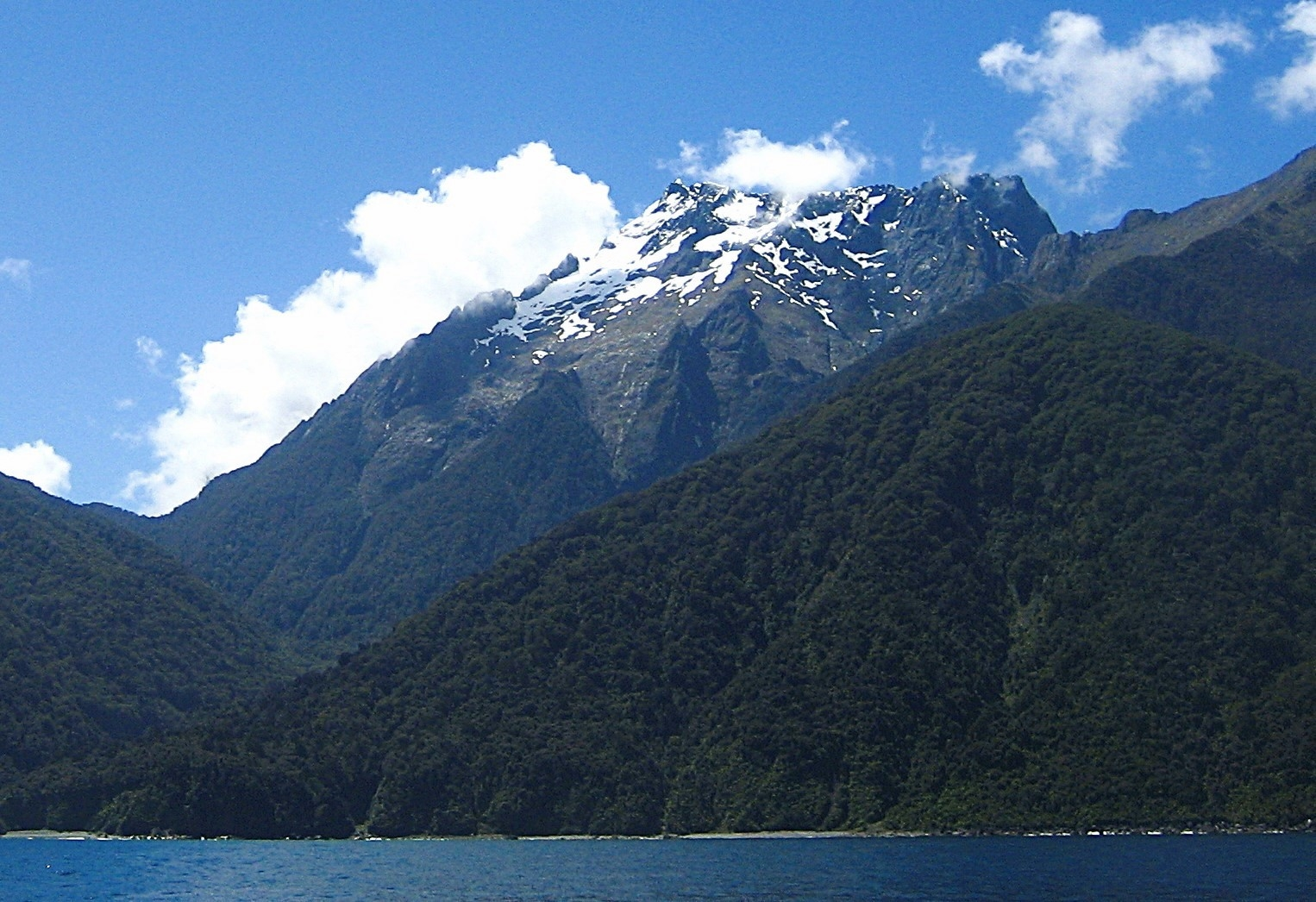
West aspect
