= List of general aviation operators of New Zealand =

This is a list of general aviation operators that have an air operator's certificate issued by the Civil Aviation Authority of New Zealand.

Operator	Image	IATA	ICAO	Callsign	Base	Notes
Air Milford					Queenstown Airport	
Air Napier					Napier Airport	
Air Safaris			SRI	Safaris	Lake Tekapo Airport	
Air Wanganui					Wanganui Airport	
Air West Coast					Greymouth Airport	
Flight Hauraki					Ardmore Airport	
Fly Stark					Whitianga Aerodrome	
Glenorchy Air					Queenstown Airport	
Island Air Charters					Tauranga Airport	
Mainland Air				Mainland	Dunedin Airport	
Real Journeys					Milford Sound Airport	
Ridge Air					Blenheim Airport	
Salt Air					Kerikeri Airport	

== See also ==
- List of airlines of New Zealand
- List of defunct airlines of New Zealand
- List of airlines
