= Mainland Air =

New Zealand aviation company

IATA	ICAO	Call sign
MD	MLD	Mainland
- Founded: 1991
- Operating bases: Dunedin International Airport, Dunedin, New Zealand
- Fleet size: 19
- Destinations: 2 (scheduled)
- Parent company: Enfield Holdings Ltd
- Headquarters: Dunedin, New Zealand
- Key people: Phillip & Shirley Kean (Managers)
- Website: Official website

Mainland Air is a general aviation, flight training and air charter company operating out of Dunedin International Airport in New Zealand.

== History ==
Mainland Air was established in 1991 by Queenstown businessman Christopher Kelliher. From 1995 to 2006 the airline operated courier flights for New Zealand Post between Dunedin and Christchurch. Later in 2007 the airline started a thrice weekly Dunedin to Alexandra and Queenstown service using a ten-seater Piper Chieftain. In March 2008 Mainland started a thrice weekly Dunedin to Invercargill service also using its Piper Chieftain aircraft. At that time Mainland were also considering services to Wānaka and Te Anau. Later all these scheduled services were dropped due to lack of demand. Late 2009 Chris Kelliher sold the company to the Paterson family who owned Mainland's major maintenance provider, Southair Ltd In 2013 Mainland Air was sold to Phil and Shirley Kean, respectively the long time Chief Pilot and General Manager. Mainland operates two Piper Chieftain twin engine aircraft for charter and air ambulance duties, a fleet of Cessna 152 aircraft for pilot training, two Piper Seneca twin engine aircraft for charter and multi-engine instrument training and a twin engine Tecnam aircraft for pilot training.

== Services ==
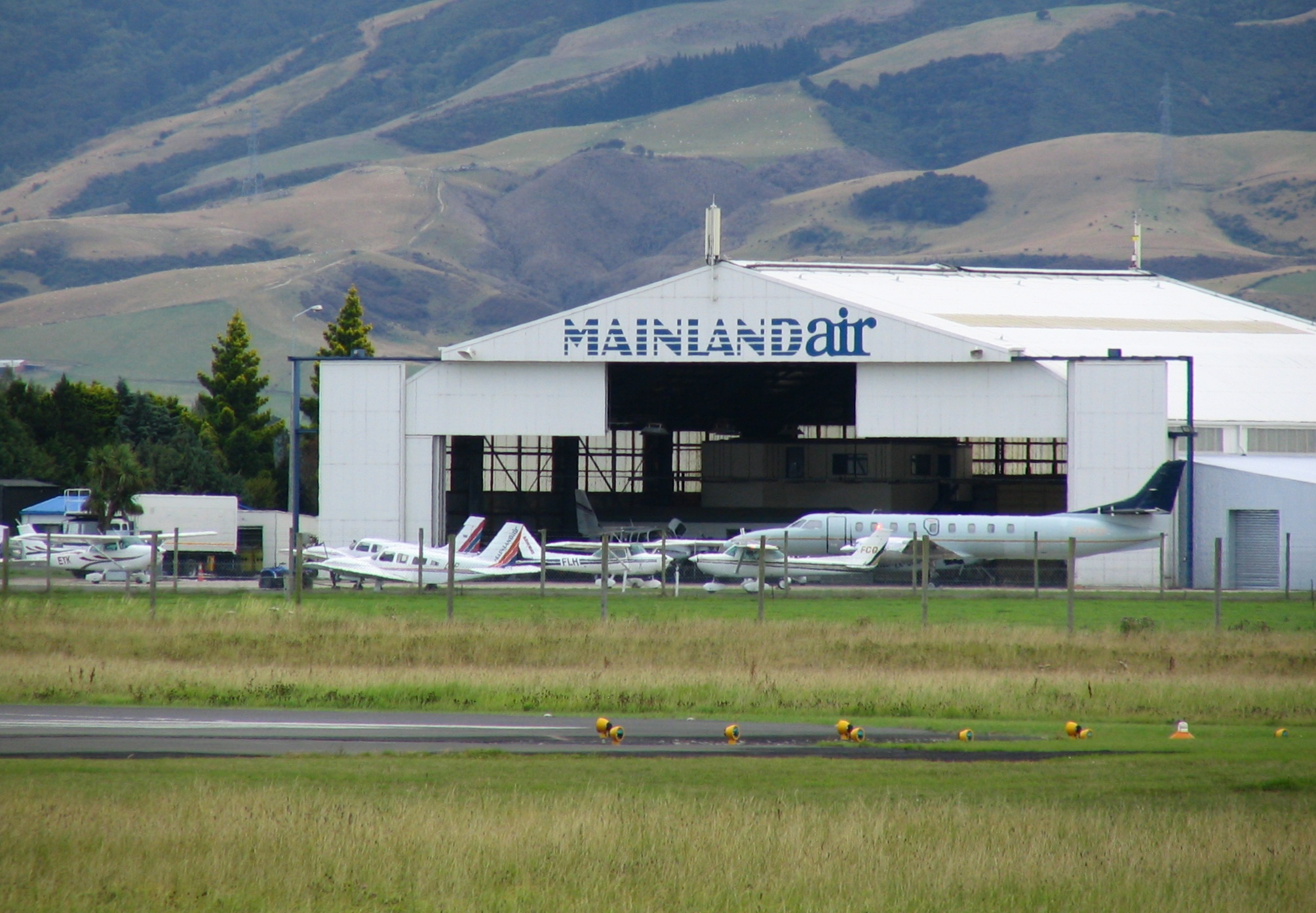
Mainland Air hangar at Dunedin Airport in 2009

Mainland Air Services provides charter flights throughout New Zealand. Its scenic flights visit popular destinations such as Milford Sound, Mount Aspiring/Tititea, Aoraki / Mount Cook, Fiordland, Omarama, Stewart Island / Rakiura, Taiaroa Heads and the Queenstown area. As well as operating air ambulance transfer flights, Mainland Air provides charter flights for medical specialists from Dunedin to Invercargill and Alexandra several times per week on behalf of the Southern District Health Board.

Mainland Air also operates a flying training school, called Mainland Aviation College.

A scheduled service began on 4 June 2014 linking Oamaru and Christchurch using Piper Chieftain aircraft. This service ended due to lack of patronage three months later.

Flights linking Timaru and Wānaka to Christchurch, and Oamaru to Wellington have also been discussed.

== Fleet ==
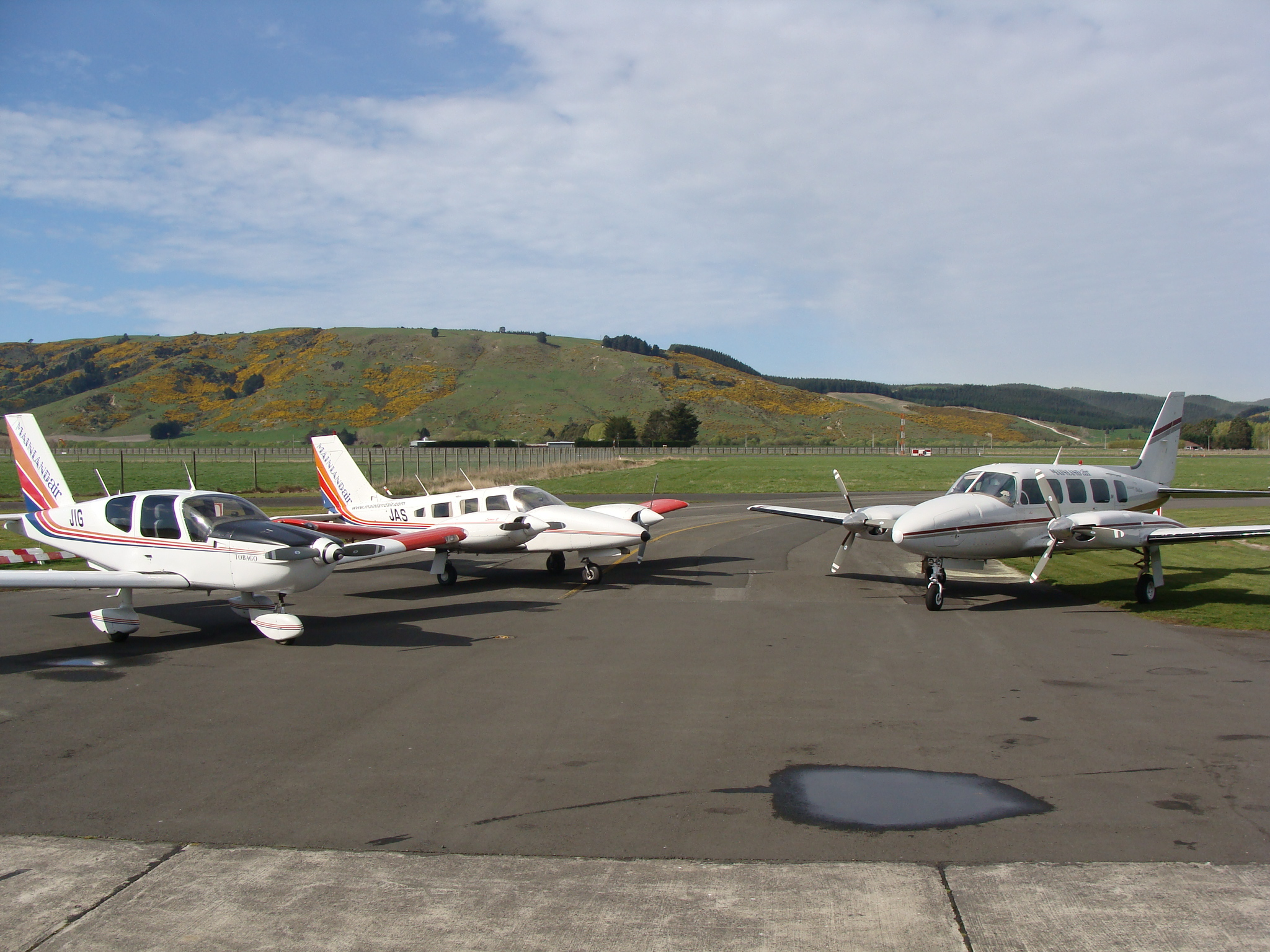
Some of the Mainland Air fleet at Dunedin Airport

Mainland Air operates the following aircraft:

Aircraft	Number	Notes
Cessna 152	5 active, 6 stored	Flying school training aircraft
Cessna 172	3	Flying school training aircraft
Piper PA-31-350 Chieftain	2	
Piper PA-34 Seneca III	2 active, one stored	

== See also ==
- Air transport in New Zealand
- List of airlines of New Zealand
- List of general aviation operators of New Zealand
