= Glenorchy Air =

Airline of New Zealand

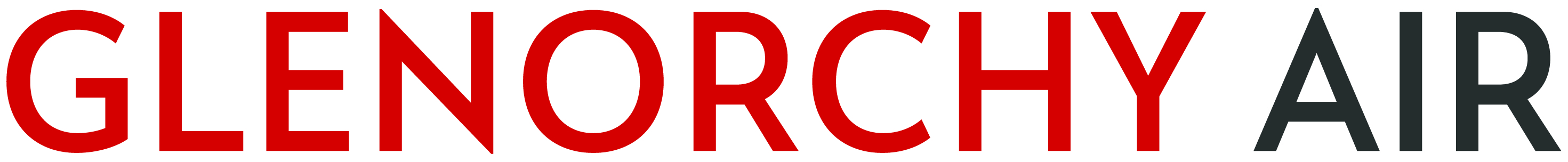
- Founded: 1992; 34 years ago
- AOC #: AOC 38167
- Hubs: Queenstown Airport
- Alliance: Mount Cook Skiplanes and Helicopters, Southern Discoveries, Glacier Explorers
- Fleet size: 5
- Destinations: Milford Sound, Mount Cook, Mt Aspiring, Glentanner, Fox Glacier, Stewart Island, Glenorchy
- Parent company: Stokes Aviation
- Headquarters: Queenstown, Otago, New Zealand
- Key people: James Stokes (CEO)
- Website: www.glenorchyair.co.nz

Glenorchy Air is a scenic flight and air charter company based at Queenstown Airport, New Zealand. The company was founded by Janet and Robert Rutherford in 1992, with just one aeroplane, a Cessna 185. With the expansion of the business, a second aircraft, a Piper PA-32-300 Cherokee Six, was purchased in 1996. The Cessna 185 was sold in 2003 when it was replaced by a new Gippsland GA8 Airvan. The company took delivery of a second Airvan in 2013 and added two more before the business was sold in 2019.

The business was purchased in July 2019 by its training manager, James Stokes, and remains family-owned and operated. In August 2019. James and parent company Stokes Aviation began a Fleet upgrade programme beginning with a refurbishment of two GA8 Airvans. Glenorchy Air announced in August that a new Cessna 206 would join its fleet, expanding its flight options to Mount Cook and other destinations. The 206 replaced an ageing Cessna 172 . In December 2019 Glenorchy Air announced the addition of a brand new Cessna 208B Grand Caravan EX to its fleet. After a long delay due to the COVID-19 delaying the ferry flight, This aircraft arrived in Queenstown in November 2020. . A second Cessna 208B EX arrived in March 2022 and entered service in April. In July 2023, Glenorchy Air announced that it had acquired a Daher Kodiak 100. A second arrived in New Zealand in October 2024.

Glenorchy Air is Qualmark Gold Certified by Tourism NZ. The company slogan is "Discover Milford Sound And Beyond".

== Services ==
Glenorchy Air operates scenic flights between Queenstown and Milford Sound as well as several activity options at Mount Cook Village, and glacier flights. Flights operate from Queenstown or from Glenorchy on demand. Charter flights are also available to anywhere in New Zealand. Day trips from Queenstown to Stewart Island started in November 2020.

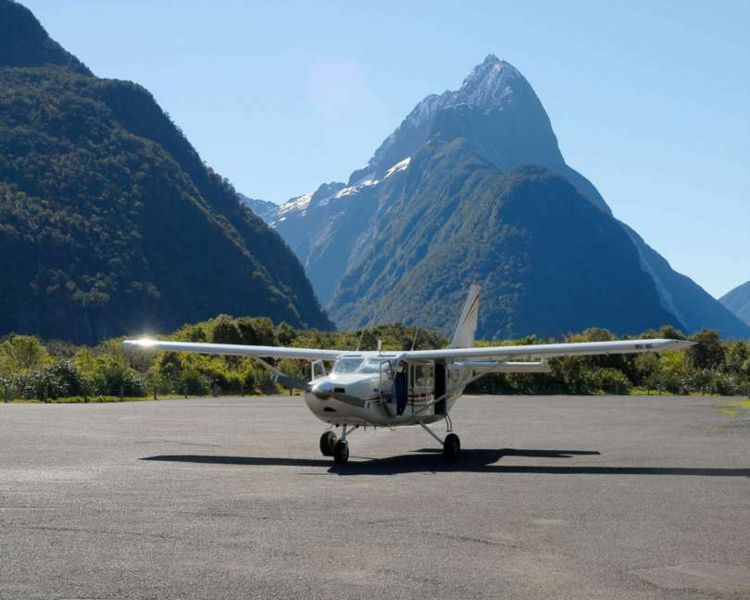
Glenorchy Air Gippsland Aeronautics GA 8 Airvan on the ground at Milford Airfield

== Lord of the Rings involvement ==
Glenorchy Air became involved in the making of The Lord of the Rings film trilogy in 1999 when it transported members of the cast, crew and equipment around the southern half of the South Island of New Zealand. This included flying producer Barrie Osbourne on reconnaissance trips to Paradise, Poolburn and Ben Ohau.

== Fuel efficiency research ==
In 2010 Glenorchy Air was one of eight companies that took part in research to determine optimum fuel efficiency. The research was of the New Zealand Tourism Energy Efficiency Programme, which was a partnership between the Tourism Industry Association and the Energy Efficiency and Conservation Authority.

Glenorchy Air installed technology which showed how much fuel its aircraft were burning on a litres-per-hour basis. It also installed GPS technology to inform pilots of their ground speed. This enabled them to determine the optimum altitude for fuel savings.

== Fleet ==
The Glenorchy Air fleet currently consists of the following aircraft:

Aircraft	Number
Gippsland GA8	1
Cessna 206	1 (to retire)
Cessna 208B	2
Daher Kodiak	2

Glenorchy Air has operated many types of aircraft in the past including Cessna 172, Cessna 177, Piper PA-32-300 and Cessna 185.

== See also ==
- Air transport in New Zealand
- List of airlines of New Zealand
- List of general aviation operators of New Zealand
- Milford Sound Airport
