= Thurso (disambiguation) =

Thurso is a town in northern Scotland.

Thurso may also refer to:

- Thurso railway station, in the Scottish town
- Thurso, Quebec, a town in Canada
- River Thurso, in northern Scotland
- Thurso River, in South Island, New Zealand
- Viscount Thurso, a title in the peerage of the United Kingdom
- John Thurso (born 1953), a Scottish politician
- SS Thurso, a British cargo ship sunk during the Second World War
- "Thurso", a song by the Scottish band Over the Wall
