= Island Air Charters =

IATA	ICAO	Call sign
-	-	-
- Commenced operations: 1995
- Operating bases: Tauranga Airport
- Fleet size: 3
- Headquarters: Tauranga, New Zealand
- Key people: Paul Ensor
- Website: www.islandair.co.nz

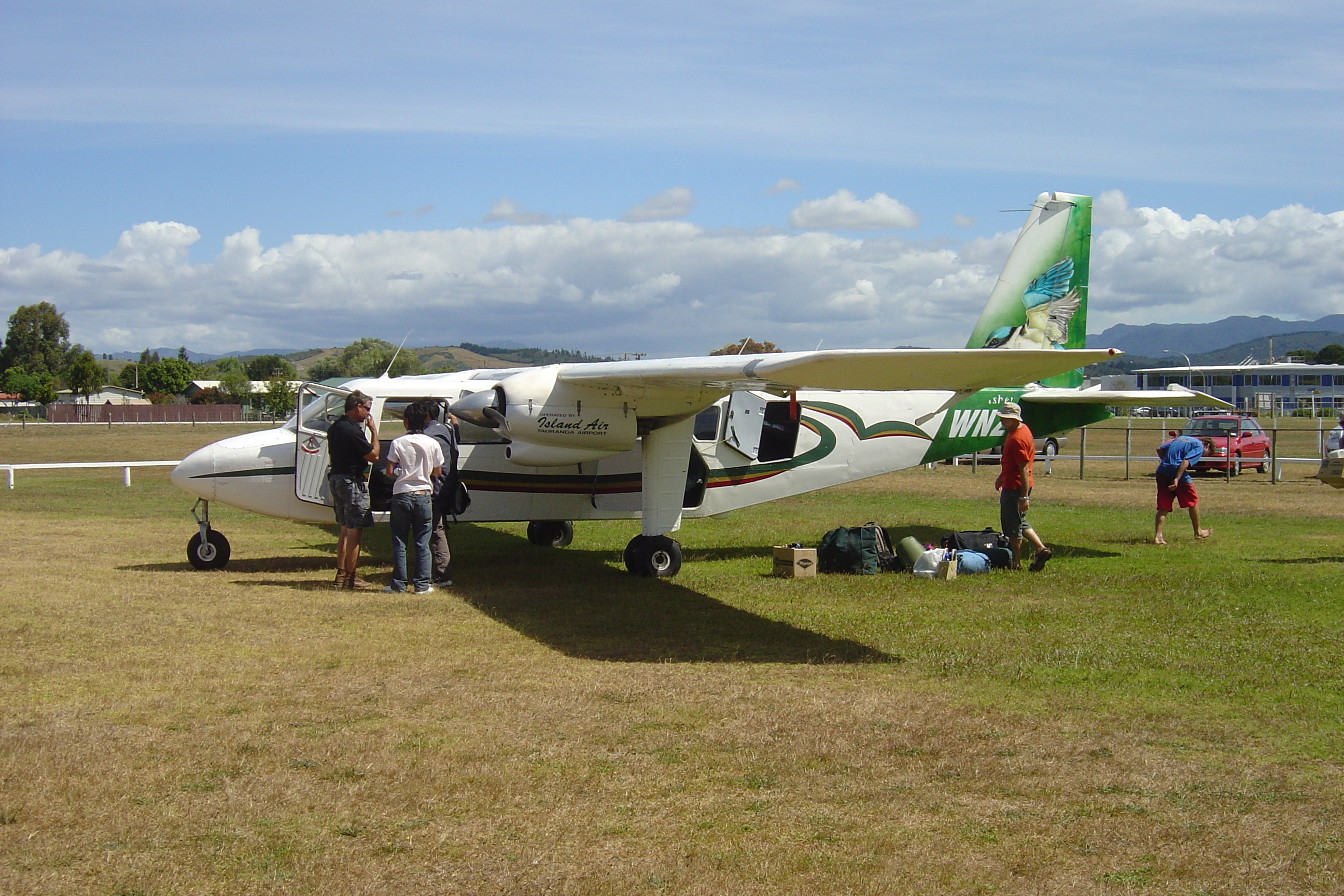
Island Air Charters Britten Norman Islander at Whitianga Airport in early 2006 - this aircraft would later crash-land on the mudflats near Tauranga in December 2006

Island Air Charters is an air charter company based in Tauranga, New Zealand. The company is owned by Paul Ensor and offers charter services around the Bay of Plenty using Cessna light aircraft.

== History ==
The airline commenced in August 1995 when its owner, Paul Ensor, acquired a Cessna P206 Super Skylane. In November 1996 a Cessna TU206A was added to the fleet. This was followed in November by a Cessna 172N. In September another Cessna 172K was added. In 2001 a Cessna U206C joined the fleet. By 2004 the fleet consisted of a Cessna TU206A and Cessna 172K. To these, in October, was added a twin-engine Britten-Norman BN-2A-27 Islander.

Because of the increase in carrying capacity Island Air began advertising a regular summer service in 2005 from Tauranga to Great Barrier Island via Whitianga two days a week. In 2006 a third flight was added. This increase in flying and aircraft maintenance needs saw the Civil Aviation Authority suspending Island Air's operating licence in November 2006 over unauthorised maintenance being carried out on the company's aircraft. A new maintenance controller and chief executive were appointed to address the issues, however, the operator's problems compounded the following month when the Britten-Norman Islander suffered two forced landings on 22 and 28 December 2006.

The second forced landing ended with the aircraft crash landing on mudflats in the Te Puna estuary at Omokoroa near Tauranga on 28 December 2006 while being flown by Paul Ensor. Nobody was injured.

In 2007, Ensor was fined $10,000 after fitting a cracked landing gear component back on an aircraft after maintenance engineers had banned its use.

In order to keep flying Island Air used the operating licenses of other companies.

== Fleet ==
Island Air Charters' fleet consists of the following aircraft:

- 1 Cessna U206G
- 1 Cessna 172K
- 1 Cessna 172M

=== Previous aircraft ===
- 1 Cessna P206
- 1 Cessna TU206A
- Britten Norman Islander

== Services ==
The airline provides a regular shuttle service to Mōtītī Island, air charter, air taxi, and scenic flights.

== See also ==
- Air transport in New Zealand
- List of airlines of New Zealand
- List of general aviation operators of New Zealand
