= Milford Sound Airport =

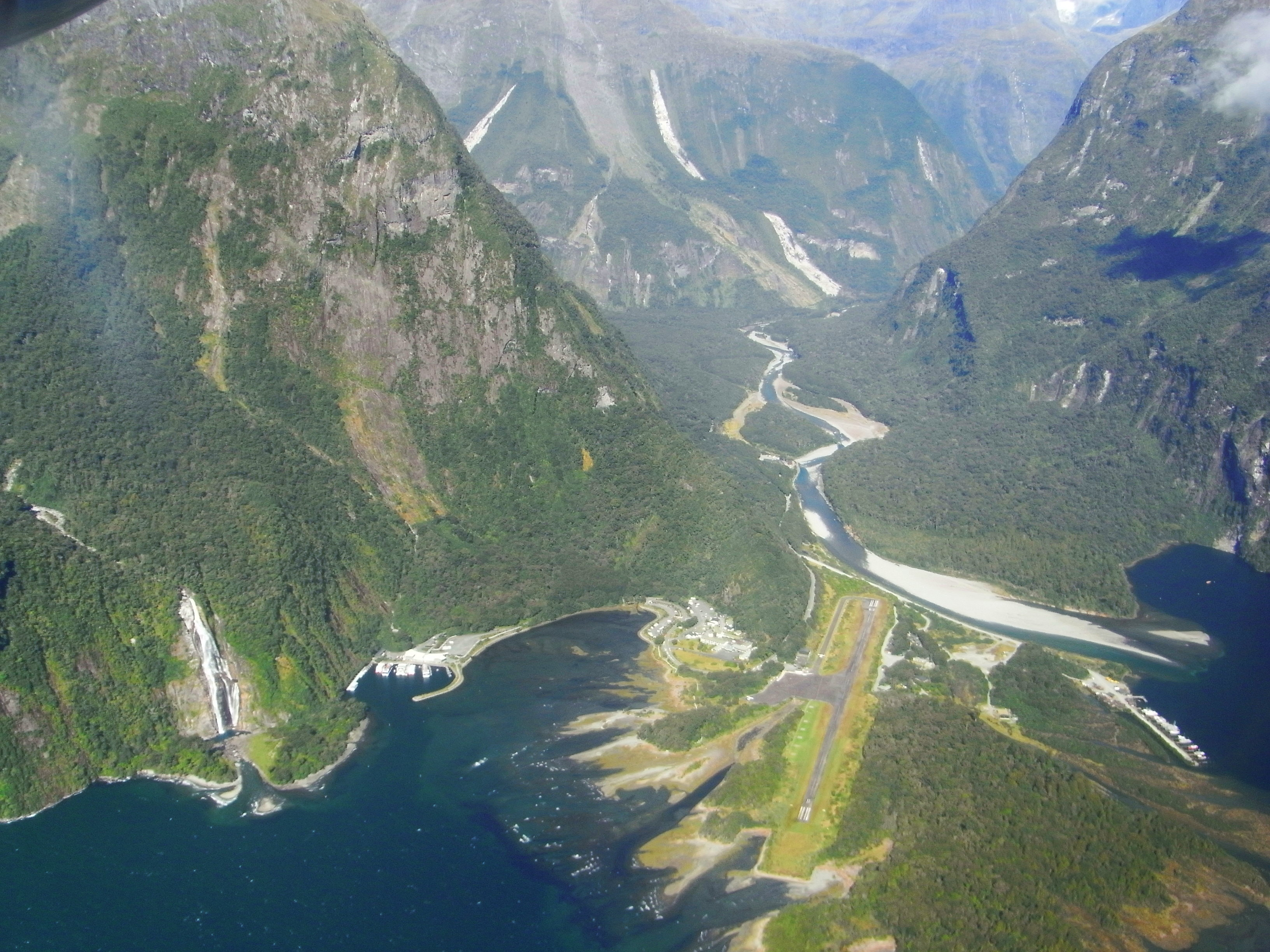
- Milford Sound Airport as seen from an aircraft
- IATA: MFN; ICAO: NZMF

Summary
- Airport type: Public
- Operator: Ministry of Transport
- Serves: Milford Sound
- Location: Milford Sound
- Elevation AMSL: 3 m / 10 ft
- Coordinates: 44°40′24″S 167°55′24″E
- Interactive map of Milford Sound Airport

Runways
| Direction | Length | | Surface |
| Direction | m | ft | Surface |
|---|---|---|---|
| 11/29 | 782 | 2,565 | Asphalt |

Milford Sound Airport (IATA: MFN, ICAO: NZMF) is a small but very busy (in terms of flight movements) airport in Milford Sound, in New Zealand's Fiordland region of the South Island. It is mainly used by tourist / flightseeing operators.

== Location ==
The Airport is located in the village Milford Sound located at the head of the fiord Milford Sound. It serves the Milford Sound tourism industry including boats, kayaks, Milford Track, as well as the fishing boats based at Milford Sound. It stands at the head of the fiord at the junction of the Cleddau and Arthur rivers.

== History ==
On 17 November 1938, a Southland Airways Puss Moth piloted by Arthur Bradshaw made the first landing in at Milford Sound. However, any further development for air operations into the Fiord was delayed by World War II. Post war pilot Fred 'Popeye' Lucas was the next to land an aircraft in Milford. He landed on the sand spit in his Southern Scenic Airtrips Auster on 22 August 1951. This then sparked the addition of an airstrip for use by his company to expand tourism into Milford Sound. An airstrip was constructed, initially 550 yards (503 metres) in length with the first official landing achieved in May 1952.

Over the years the airstrip has been upgraded and lengthened till today's sealed strip of 792 metres. In order for Southern Scenic Airtrips and National Airways Corporation (NAC) to be able to fly the larger twin-engine aircraft into the area the airstrip became officially licensed in 1956.

Prior to the ability of air operations, Milford Sound had no access in the winter months as the roads became impassable. With the addition of the airstrip, it was recorded that by 1964 more than 400 tourists were taking the 'Gateway to Magnificence Experience' flight to Milford Sound each month at peak holiday time.

== Activity ==
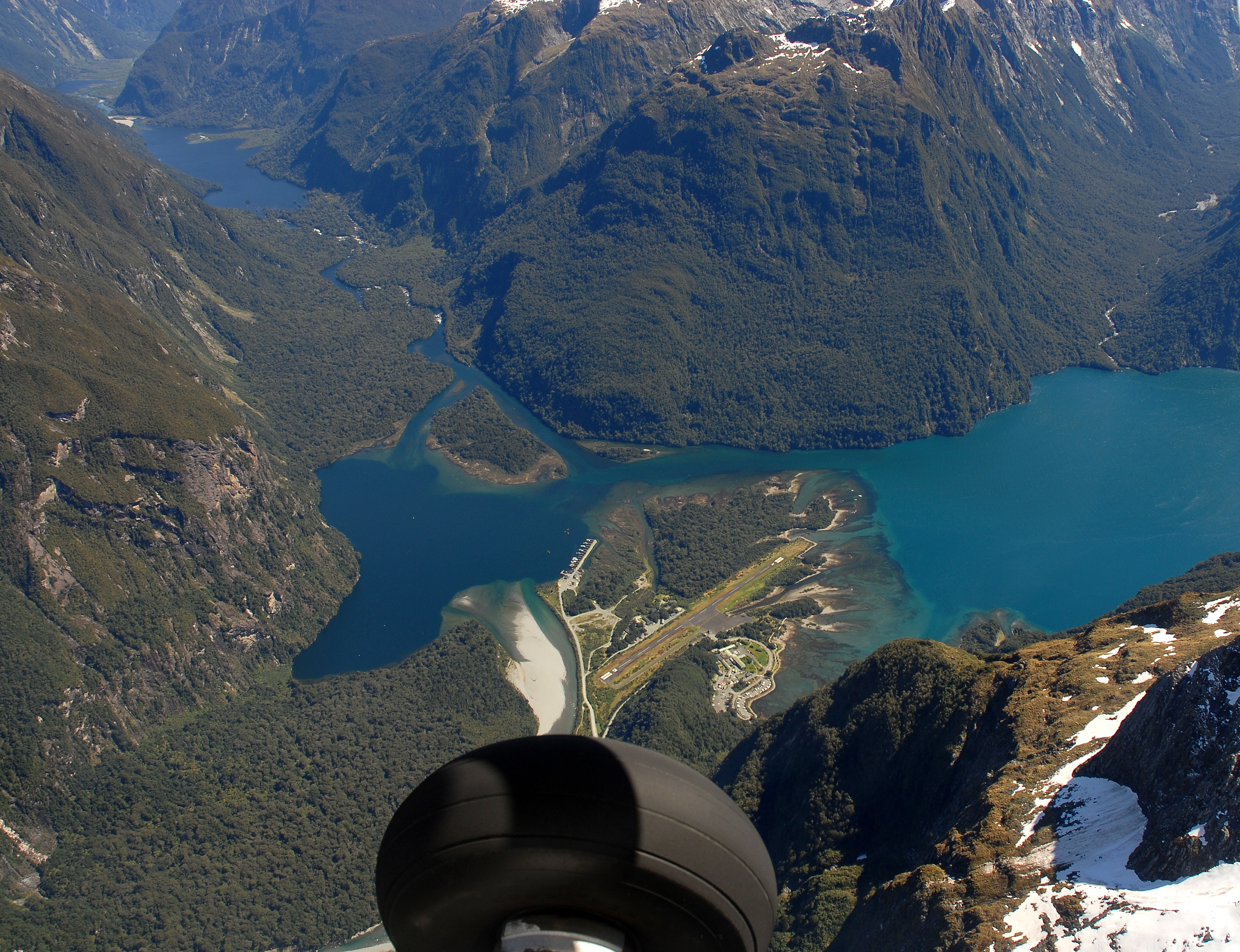
Aerial view of Milford Sound Airport from a Glenorchy Air GA8 aircraft.

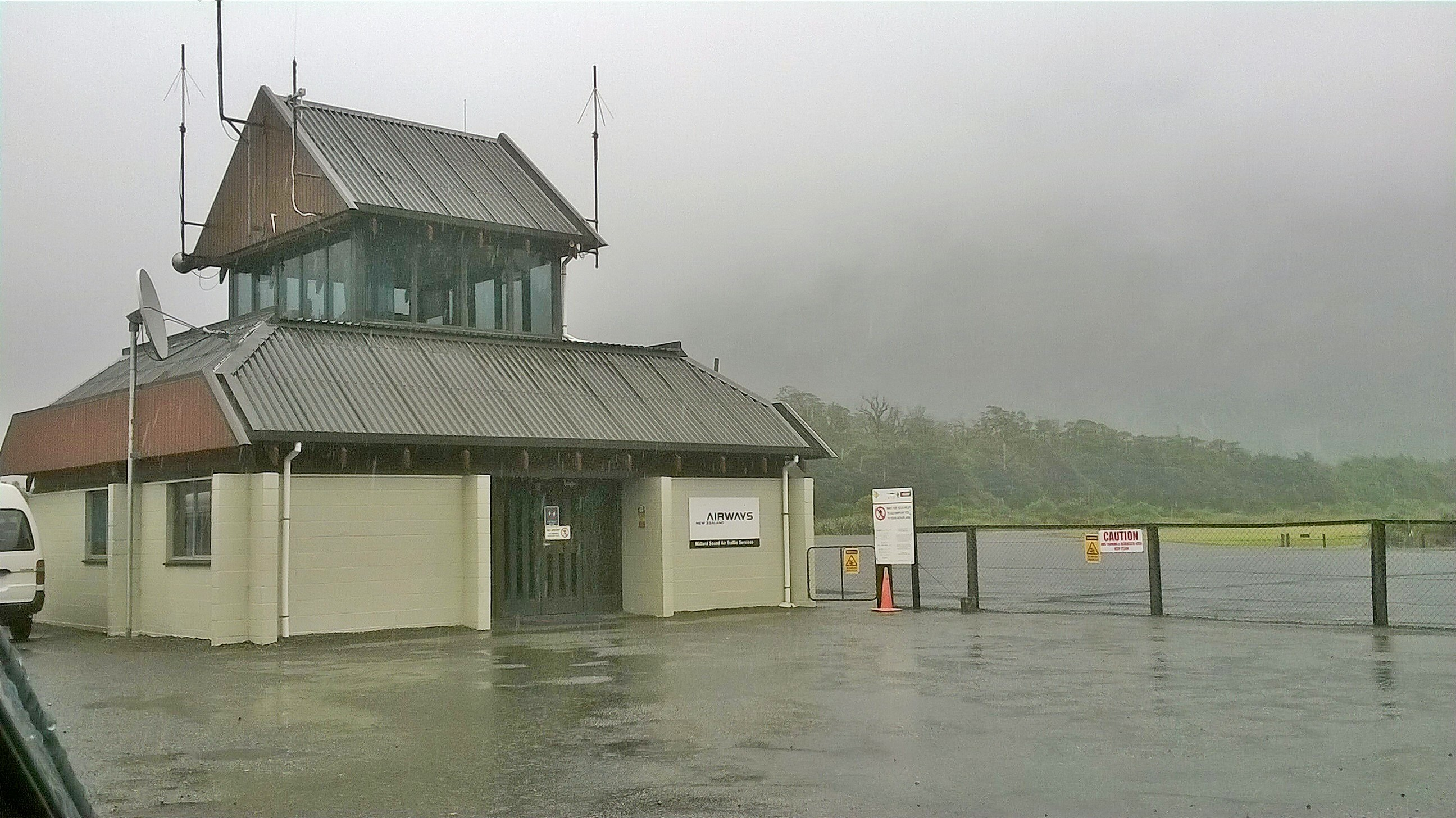
The Flight Service building at Milford Sound

Weather permitting, there is substantial daily charter traffic of light aircraft (mostly Cessna Caravan and GA8 Airvan) to and from Queenstown and Wānaka. Helicopters are also very active. The New Zealand Civil Aviation Authority publishes a GAP (Good Aviation Practices) document for flying to/from Milford Sound Airport.

== Airlines and destinations ==
| Airlines | Destinations |
|---|---|
| Air Fiordland | Queenstown, Te Anau, Wānaka |
| Air Milford | Queenstown |
| Air Safaris | Lake Tekapo |
| Aspiring Helicopters | Wānaka |
| Fly Fiordland | Glenorchy Aerodrome, Martins Bay, Te Anau |
| Glacier Southern Lakes Helicopters | Queenstown |
| Glenorchy Air | Glenorchy Airport, Queenstown |
| Milford Flights | Queenstown |
| Milford Sound Flightseeing | Queenstown |
| Southern Alps Air | Wānaka |
| True South Flights | Queenstown |

Milford Sound Helicopters is based at the airport.

== See also ==
- List of airports in New Zealand
- List of airlines of New Zealand
- Transport in New Zealand
