= Thurso River =

River in New Zealand

- Route of the Thurso River
- Mouth of the Thurso River Thurso River (South Island)
- Native name: Ōtehika

Location
- Country: New Zealand

Physical characteristics
- Source: Mount Pembroke
  - coordinates: 44°33′55″S 167°52′27″E
- Mouth
  - location: Tasman Sea
  - coordinates: 44°33′51″S 167°49′14″E
  - elevation: 0 m (0 ft)

Basin features
- Progression: Thurso River → Tasman Sea

The Thurso River (also known as Ōtehika) is a river in northern Fiordland, New Zealand. It rises west of Mount Pembroke and flows westward into the Tasman Sea north of Milford Sound.

== See also ==
- List of rivers of New Zealand
