= John Gibb (painter) =

19th-century Scottish painter living in New Zealand

John H. Gibb (2 April 1831 – 10 September 1909) was a Scottish-born New Zealand landscape painter famous for his paintings of New Zealand's coast.

== Biography ==
Two swaggers boiling a billy of tea, Milford Sound by John Gibb, oil on canvas Christchurch 1886

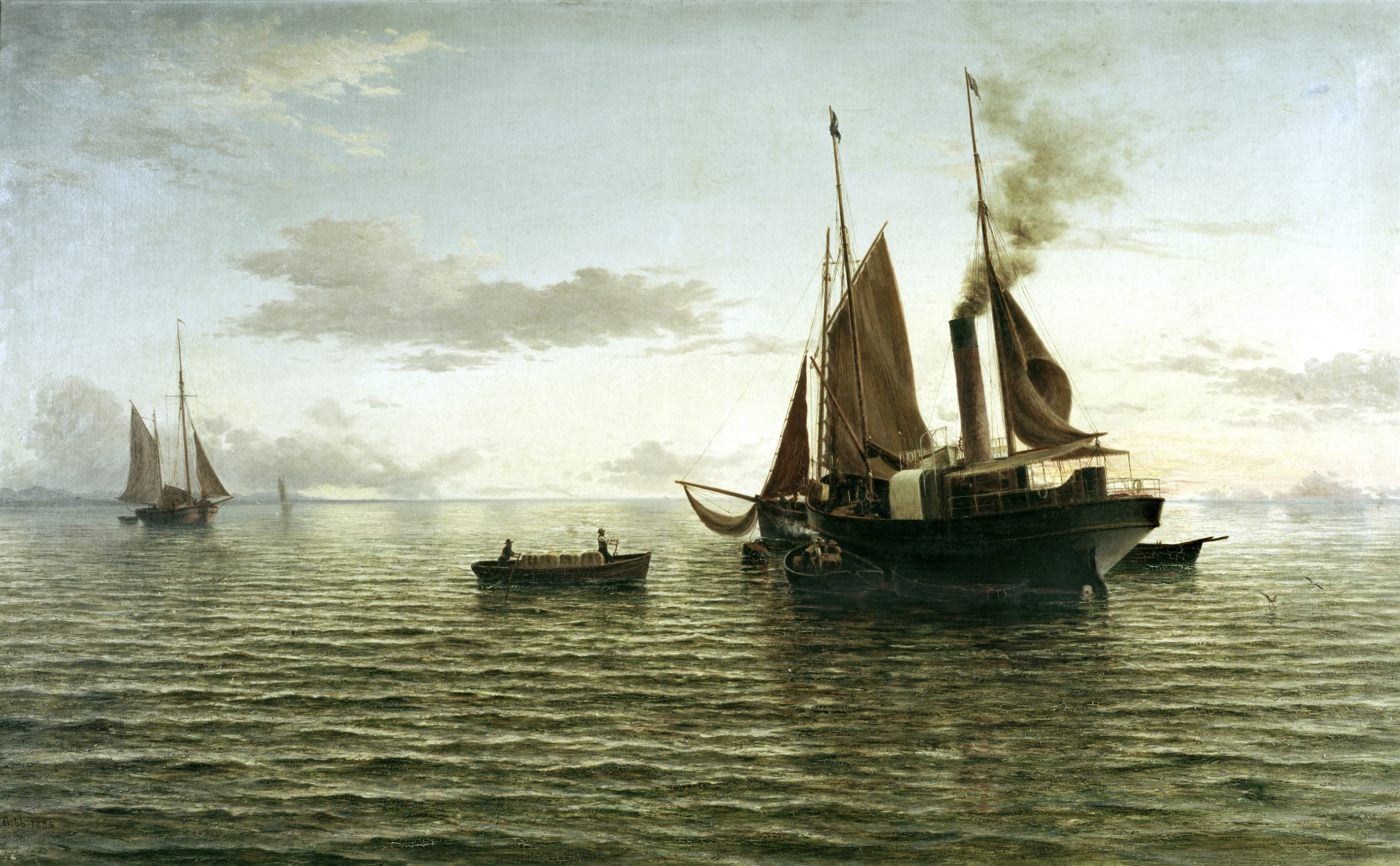
The Wool Season, 1885, oil on canvas

He was born in Cumbernauld, Scotland. Early in his life, Gibb had shown a natural aptitude for drawing and painting that was encouraged by his family. By 1849 he was receiving tuition in the studio of John McKenzie of Greenock, Scotland. His first wife was Agnes Crighton whom he married in 1852. Agnes died in 1855 during childbirth. He married for a second time, to Marion Menzies, his cousin in 1857. The River Clyde and the environs of the Firth of Clyde were the focus of Gibb's paintings during the 1850s, 60s and early 70s. In 1861 he began exhibiting at the Royal Scottish Academy. Gibb settled in the village of Innellan, near Dunoon on the Firth of Clyde, briefly moving to Alnwick in Northumberland around 1865. Gibb had returned to Innellan by 1868, the year he began exhibiting at the more progressive Royal Glasgow Institute of the Fine Arts.

The Gibbs had the heartbreak of 3 daughters dying of scarlet fever in 1873. Gibb emigrated from Scotland to New Zealand in 1876 with his wife (died 27 May 1891), and four sons. They travelled on the vessel Merope and arrived in Canterbury in September, 1876.

Gibb had purchased a block of land on the corner of Barbadoes and Worcester Streets, Christchurch and he built three houses on the site. The house known as Gibb's Cottage may have been built originally as a studio as the family initially lived in one of the other two houses which Gibb had named Merkland Villa after his home Merkland Cottage in Kirkintilloch, Scotland. However Gibb spent his later years living in Gibb Cottage and tending his large vegetable garden.

Within three months of his arrival in Christchurch, Gibbs had set up his studio and had begun to take on students. Gibb followed the academic practice of sketching the landscape and gathering information which was later worked up in the studio with intense attention to detail. In later years, as a keen photographer, he regularly used his half-plate camera to good effect as an aide memoire.

Gibb almost immediately began making painting excursions around the South Island. Initially he exhibited at the Otago Society of Art Exhibitions as there was no art society in Christchurch. He was a founding member of the Canterbury Society of Arts when it was formed in 1880 and continued to exhibit his many works there until his death. He exhibited wherever possible and showed works in Auckland and Wellington from the early 1880s as well as sending works to many international and inter-colonial exhibitions beyond New Zealand. By the 1880s Gibb was regarded as New Zealand's major professional marine painter.

Around 1880 he moved to Australia where he became a member of the Art Society of New South Wales in Sydney. The family returned to New Zealand by 1892.

Of John Gibb's sons William Menzies Gibb (1859–1931) was also a painter who trained under his father and at the National Gallery of Victoria School in Melbourne, Mr J. W. Gibb was an art dealer in Christchurch and Mr H. B. Gibb was in business in Geelong, Australia

== List of works ==
- Cairnryan Bay, Kirkcudbrightshire, 1864, oil on canvas. Collection of Government Art Collection
- The Wool Season, 1885, oil on canvas. Collection of Museum of New Zealand Te Papa Tongarewa
- Mount Cook, New Zealand, 1890, oil on canvas. Collection of Perth & Kinross Council
