= Milford Sound (village) =

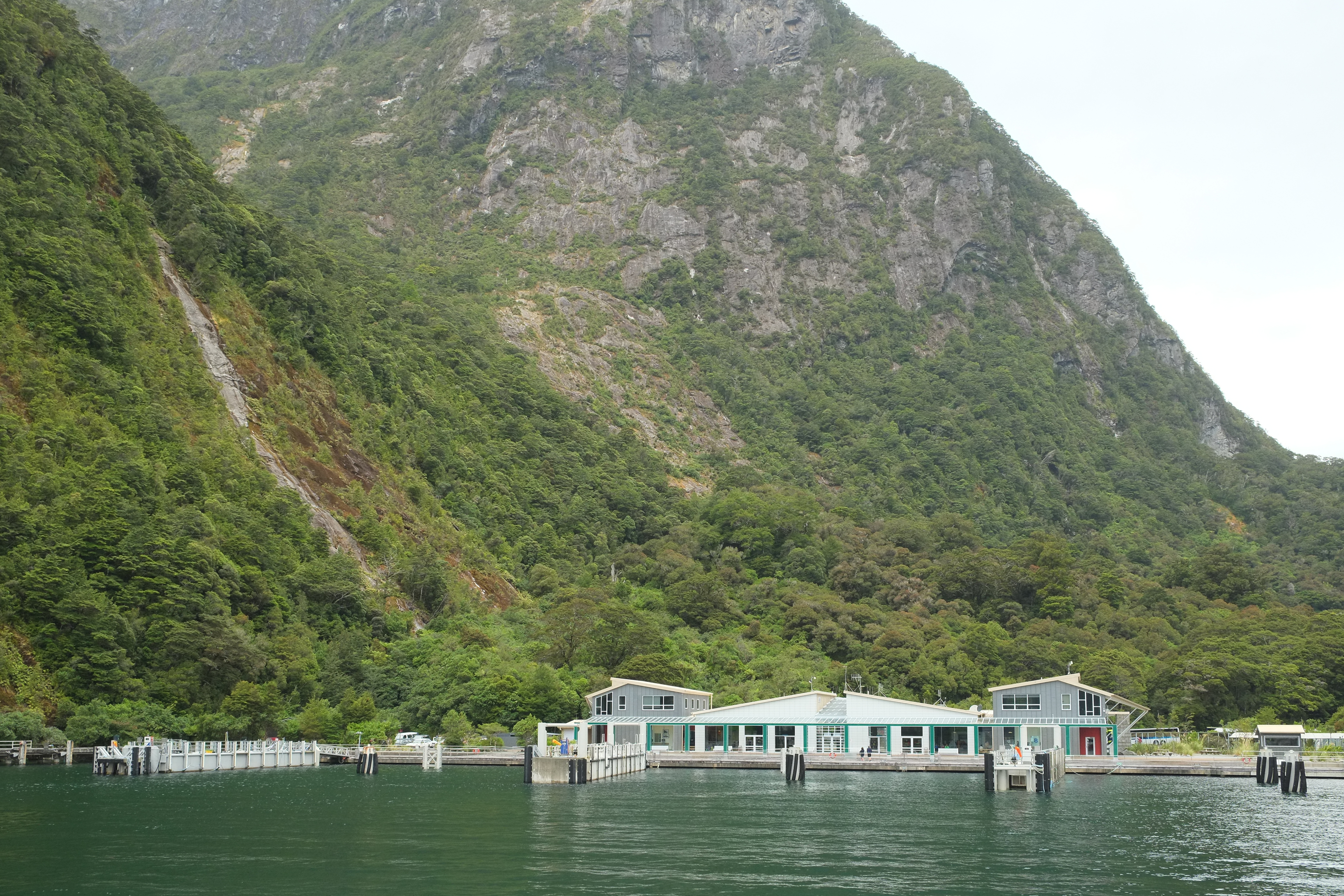
- Milford Sound visitor centre and wharf
- Interactive map of Milford Sound
- Coordinates: 44°40.23′S 167°55.30′E
- Country: New Zealand
- Island: South Island
- Region: Southland region
- Territorial authorities of New Zealand: Southland District
- Ward: Mararoa Waimea Ward
- Community: Fiordland Community
- Electorates: Southland; Te Tai Tonga (Māori)

Government
  - Territorial authority: Southland District Council
  - Regional council: Southland Regional Council
  - Mayor of Southland: Rob Scott
  - Southland MP: Joseph Mooney
  - Te Tai Tonga MP: Tākuta Ferris

Area
  - Total: 8.34 km^{2} (3.22 sq mi)

Population (2018 Census)
  - Total: 105
  - Density: 12.6/km^{2} (32.6/sq mi)
- Time zone: UTC+12 (NZST)
  - Summer (DST): UTC+13 (NZDT)
- Postcode: 9679
- Area code: 03
- Local iwi: Ngāi Tahu

Milford Sound is a small village located deep within Fiordland National Park in the Southland Region of New Zealand. It is located at the head of the fiord also called Milford Sound. The village and fiord are one of the most visited places in New Zealand, receiving about one million day visitors per year.

== History ==
Māori were mostly mobile and there is no evidence of permanent settlement in this location.

The first European person to live at Milford Sound was the explorer and former soldier Donald Sutherland (1843 or 1844 – 1919), who arrived on 3 December 1877 and lived there for the rest of his life. The nearby Sutherland Falls and Sutherland Sound are named after him. After Sutherland married in 1890, he and his wife built an accommodation house; Milford Sound was visited by steamers twice a year during the 1880s. The government paid him to build a track to Sutherland Falls and in his first season in 1888/89, 40 tourists visited. In the following season, this increased to 70 tourists. His widow sold their accommodation house to the government in 1922.

Quintin McKinnon (1851–1892) was tasked by the Otago Survey Department with achieving land access to Milford Sound. He was successful in finding a route over what is now called McKinnon Pass, with the route itself now known as the Milford Track. This was the first access by foot known to Europeans; Māori had known of it for centuries.

Road access to Milford Sound was first envisaged by William H. Homer some time after he and George Barber discovered the Homer Saddle in 1889. It was Homer who suggested that a tunnel should be built underneath the pass as it was located at a height of 1,375 metres (4,511 ft) but it was not until 1935 that the project was started. Progress was slow and it took until 1953 that Homer Tunnel was opened. After this road had been achieved, tourism to Milford Sound increased exponentially. Milford Sound is the terminus for the road—State Highway 94 but also known as Milford Road—which is administered by the NZ Transport Agency. Up until the 1970s, the road was closed over winter but is now open year-round. Milford Sound Airport has operated since 1952 and caters for up to twin-engine aircraft sized planes.

== Milford Sound today ==
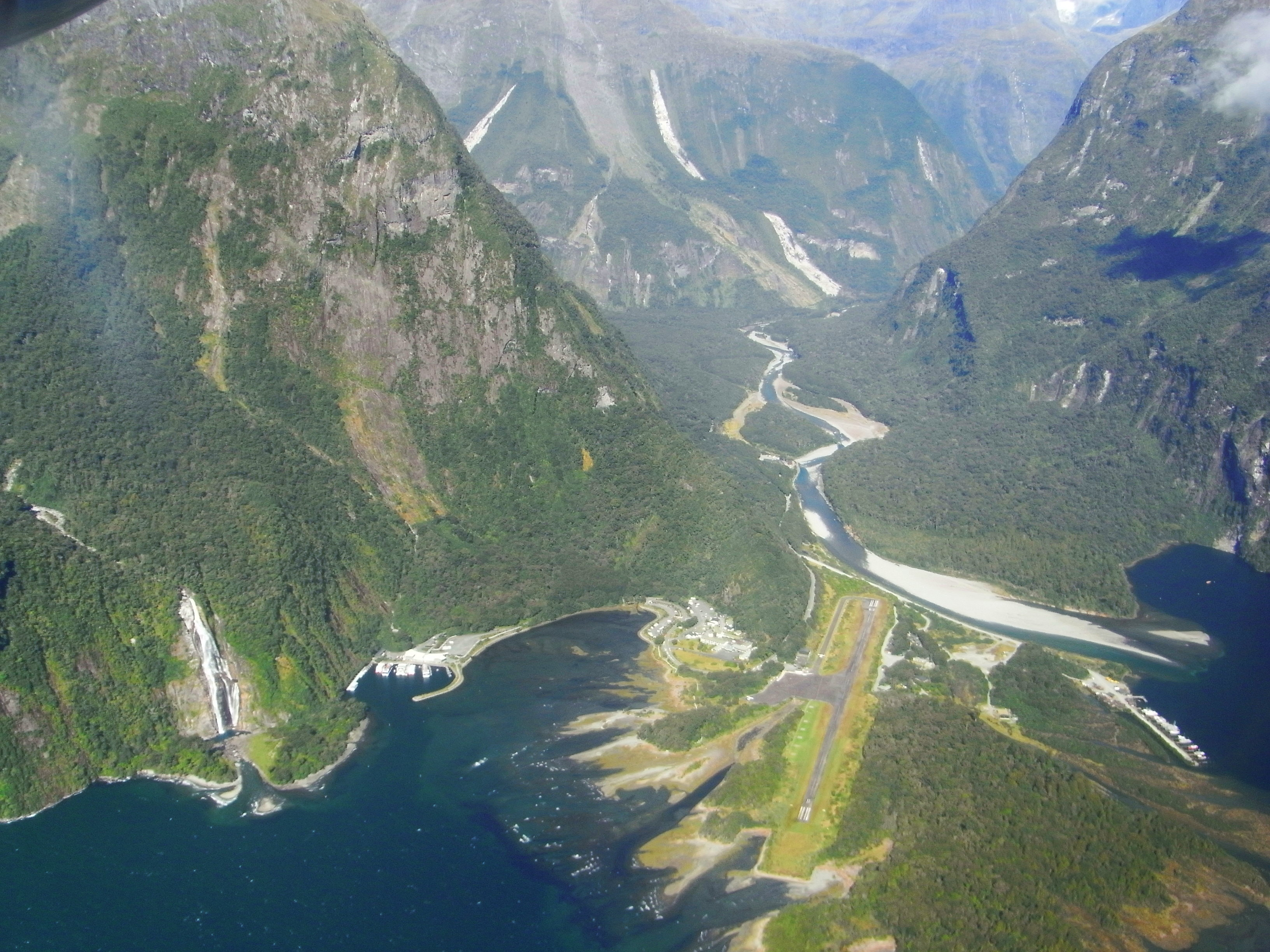
Aerial view of the village and airport in 2008

At an annual average of over 6,800 millimetres (270 in) of rain with 182 rain days, Milford Sound is the wettest permanently lived in settlement in New Zealand. The heavier the rain, the more spectacular the waterfalls, with the Lady Bowen Falls closest to the village. Most tourists visiting Milford Sound are day tourists and just one lodge provides overnight accommodation. As the settlement is located in a national park, camping is not permitted. Most tourists reach Milford Sound by tour coach from Queenstown and with an eight-hour return trip, the village is only busy either side of lunchtime. Some tourists start their journey in Te Anau, which at four hours return is much closer. Annual visitor numbers were expected to exceed one million for the first time in 2019.

The village gets its drinking water from the Bowen River and this river also feeds a small hydroelectric plant for power supply.

== Demographics ==
Historical population
Year	Pop.	±% p.a.
2006	105	—
2013	96	−1.27%
2018	105	+1.81%

Milford Sound village covers 8.34 km^{2} (3.22 sq mi), and is part of the much larger but almost entirely unpopulated Fiordland statistical area.

The village had a population of 105 at the 2018 New Zealand census, an increase of 9 people (9.4%) since the 2013 census, and unchanged since the 2006 census. There were 0 households, comprising 48 males and 57 females, giving a sex ratio of 0.84 males per female. The median age was 27.9 years (compared with 37.4 years nationally), with no people aged under 15 years, 69 (65.7%) aged 15 to 29, 36 (34.3%) aged 30 to 64, and 3 (2.9%) aged 65 or older.

Ethnicities were 74.3% European/Pākehā, 8.6% Māori, 25.7% Asian, and 2.9% other ethnicities. People may identify with more than one ethnicity.

Although some people chose not to answer the census's question about religious affiliation, 65.7% had no religion, 20.0% were Christian, 2.9% were Muslim and 5.7% had other religions.

Of those at least 15 years old, 27 (25.7%) people had a bachelor's or higher degree, and 9 (8.6%) people had no formal qualifications. The median income was $34,000, compared with $31,800 nationally. 3 people (2.9%) earned over $70,000 compared to 17.2% nationally. The employment status of those at least 15 was that 102 (97.1%) people were employed full-time, and 3 (2.9%) were part-time.
