= Harrison River (New Zealand) =

River in New Zealand

- Location within New Zealand
- Interactive map of Harrison River
- Location: Southland, New Zealand
- Coordinates: 44.591°S 167.910°E

Harrison River is a river in Southland, New Zealand. It flows from Lake Never-never to Harrison Cove in Milford Sound.
