= Milford Sound =

Fiord in the southwest of New Zealand's South Island

- Piopiotahi (Māori)
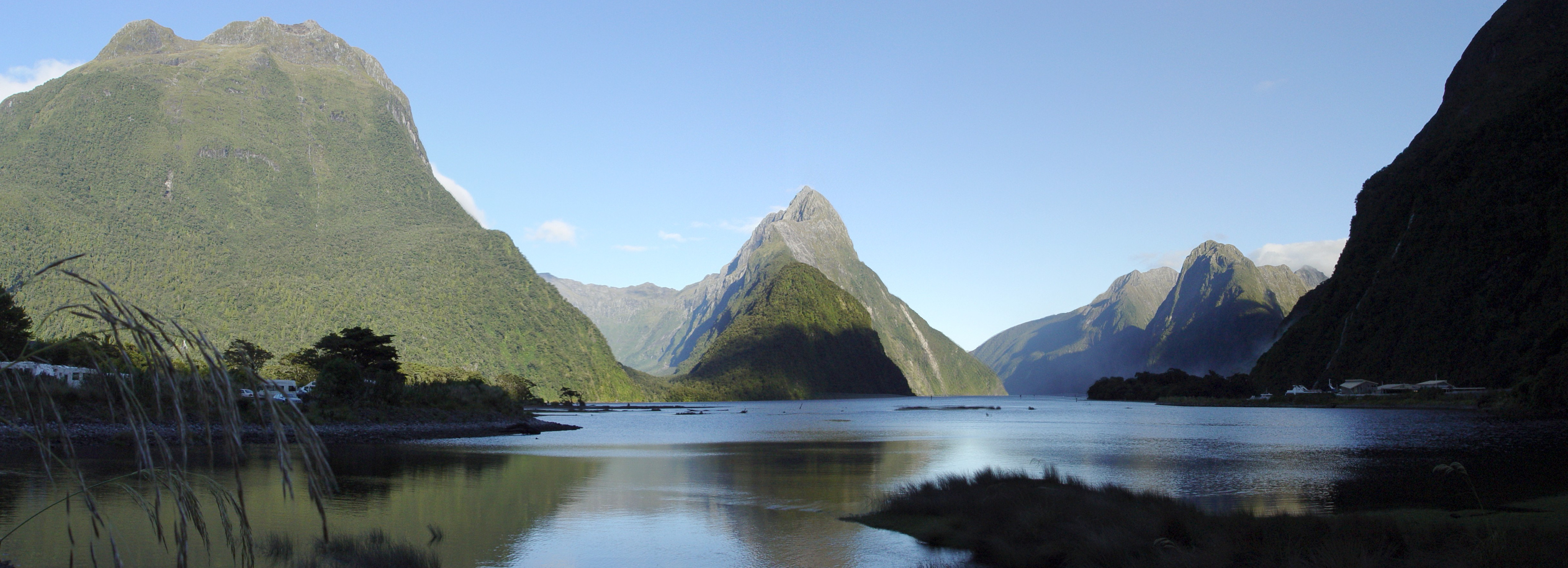
- Panorama of Milford Sound looking northwest from the township. Mitre Peak (centre) rises 1,692 m (5,551 ft) above the sound.

- Location within Fiordland Location within New Zealand Location within Oceania
- Location: Fiordland, New Zealand
- Coordinates: 44°38′53″S 167°54′20″E
- Part of: Tasman Sea
- River sources: Cleddau River, Arthur River, Harrison River
- Max. length: 15.1 kilometres (9.4 mi)
- Max. width: 1.94 kilometres (1.21 mi)
- Surface area: 25 square kilometres (9.7 sq mi)
- Max. depth: 291 metres (955 ft)

Milford Sound (Māori: Piopiotahi, officially gazetted as Milford Sound / Piopiotahi) is a fiord in the south west of New Zealand's South Island within Fiordland National Park, Piopiotahi (Milford Sound) Marine Reserve, and the Te Wahipounamu World Heritage site. It has been judged the world's top travel destination in an international survey (the 2008 Travelers' Choice Destinations Awards by TripAdvisor) and is acclaimed as New Zealand's most famous tourist destination. Rudyard Kipling called it the eighth Wonder of the World. The fiord is most commonly accessed via road (State Highway 94) by tour coach, with the road terminating at a small village also called Milford Sound.

== Etymology ==
Milford Sound / Piopiotahi is one of roughly 90 places to have been given a dual name as part of a 1998 Treaty of Waitangi settlement with Ngāi Tahu, recognising the significance of the fiord to both Māori and Pākehā New Zealanders. This name consists of both the Māori name and the former official name used together as a single name, instead of as interchangeable alternate names.

In te reo Māori, the fiord is known as Piopiotahi after the now extinct piopio, a thrush-like bird that used to inhabit New Zealand. According to the Māori legend of Māui trying to win immortality for humanity, a single piopio flew to the fiord in mourning following Māui's death. The name Piopiotahi refers to this bird, with tahi meaning 'one' in Māori. The fiord was given its European name in 1823, when the sealer John Grono named it Milford Sound after Milford Haven in his birthplace of Wales. The Cleddau River, which flows into the fiord, was also named for its Welsh namesake.

== Geography ==
As a fiord, Milford Sound was formed by glaciation over millions of years. The village at the end of the fiord is also known as Milford Sound.

Milford Sound runs 15 kilometres (9.3 mi) inland from the Tasman Sea at Dale Point (also named after a location close to Milford Haven in Wales)—the mouth of the fiord—and is surrounded by sheer rock faces that rise 1,200 metres (3,900 ft) or more on either side. Among the peaks are The Elephant at 1,517 metres (4,977 ft), said to resemble an elephant's head, and The Lion, 1,302 metres (4,272 ft), in the shape of a crouching lion.

Milford Sound sports two permanent waterfalls, Lady Bowen Falls and Stirling Falls. After heavy rain temporary waterfalls can be seen running down the steep sided rock faces that line the fiord. They are fed by rainwater-drenched moss and will last a few days once the rain stops.

=== Climate ===
With a mean annual rainfall of 6,412 mm (252 in) each year, a high level even for the West Coast, Milford Sound is known as the wettest inhabited place in New Zealand and one of the wettest in the world. Rainfall can reach 250 mm (10 in) during 24 hours. The rainfall creates dozens of temporary waterfalls (as well as several major, more permanent ones) cascading down the cliff faces, some reaching a thousand metres in length. Smaller falls from such heights may never reach the bottom of the sound, drifting away in the wind.

Accumulated rainwater can sometimes cause portions of the rainforest to lose their grip on sheer cliff faces, resulting in tree avalanches into the fiord—the regrowth of the rainforest after these avalanches can be seen in several locations along the sound.

Climate data for Milford Sound Airport (1991–2020 normals, extremes 1934–present)
Month	Jan	Feb	Mar	Apr	May	Jun	Jul	Aug	Sep	Oct	Nov	Dec	Year
Record high °C (°F)	28.3 (82.9)	29.4 (84.9)	27.4 (81.3)	24.5 (76.1)	20.7 (69.3)	17.7 (63.9)	19.3 (66.7)	18.9 (66.0)	20.8 (69.4)	24.1 (75.4)	25.9 (78.6)	27.7 (81.9)	29.4 (84.9)
Mean maximum °C (°F)	24.9 (76.8)	24.7 (76.5)	23.2 (73.8)	20.3 (68.5)	17.0 (62.6)	14.5 (58.1)	14.4 (57.9)	15.8 (60.4)	18.0 (64.4)	20.2 (68.4)	21.9 (71.4)	23.6 (74.5)	25.6 (78.1)
Mean daily maximum °C (°F)	19.5 (67.1)	20.0 (68.0)	18.5 (65.3)	15.9 (60.6)	12.5 (54.5)	9.3 (48.7)	9.2 (48.6)	11.2 (52.2)	13.2 (55.8)	15.0 (59.0)	16.4 (61.5)	18.5 (65.3)	14.9 (58.8)
Daily mean °C (°F)	15.1 (59.2)	15.4 (59.7)	13.8 (56.8)	11.4 (52.5)	8.7 (47.7)	5.8 (42.4)	5.4 (41.7)	6.9 (44.4)	8.7 (47.7)	10.4 (50.7)	12.0 (53.6)	14.1 (57.4)	10.6 (51.1)
Mean daily minimum °C (°F)	10.7 (51.3)	10.7 (51.3)	9.2 (48.6)	7.0 (44.6)	4.9 (40.8)	2.3 (36.1)	1.6 (34.9)	2.7 (36.9)	4.1 (39.4)	5.8 (42.4)	7.6 (45.7)	9.7 (49.5)	6.4 (43.5)
Mean minimum °C (°F)	5.9 (42.6)	6.1 (43.0)	4.5 (40.1)	2.3 (36.1)	−0.1 (31.8)	−1.6 (29.1)	−2.0 (28.4)	−1.2 (29.8)	−0.3 (31.5)	1.0 (33.8)	2.6 (36.7)	5.0 (41.0)	−2.3 (27.9)
Record low °C (°F)	3.5 (38.3)	2.7 (36.9)	0.5 (32.9)	−1.7 (28.9)	−3.0 (26.6)	−4.3 (24.3)	−6.1 (21.0)	−3.3 (26.1)	−3.9 (25.0)	−1.0 (30.2)	0.0 (32.0)	1.5 (34.7)	−6.1 (21.0)
Average rainfall mm (inches)	667.2 (26.27)	466.6 (18.37)	571.3 (22.49)	528.2 (20.80)	645.1 (25.40)	440.4 (17.34)	468.0 (18.43)	457.0 (17.99)	541.3 (21.31)	617.2 (24.30)	557.7 (21.96)	585.1 (23.04)	6,545.1 (257.7)
Average rainy days (≥ 1.0 mm)	16.3	12.8	14.4	13.3	15.6	14.6	14.4	16.0	17.6	17.6	15.3	16.9	184.8
Average relative humidity (%)	90.7	93.3	93.6	93.4	94.3	95.2	94.1	94.9	93.6	92.3	89.2	88.9	92.8
Average dew point °C (°F)	13.6 (56.5)	14.3 (57.7)	12.8 (55.0)	10.4 (50.7)	7.8 (46.0)	5.1 (41.2)	4.5 (40.1)	6.1 (43.0)	7.7 (45.9)	9.2 (48.6)	10.3 (50.5)	12.3 (54.1)	9.5 (49.1)
Source 1: NIWA Climate Data
Source 2: CliFlo

=== Wildlife ===
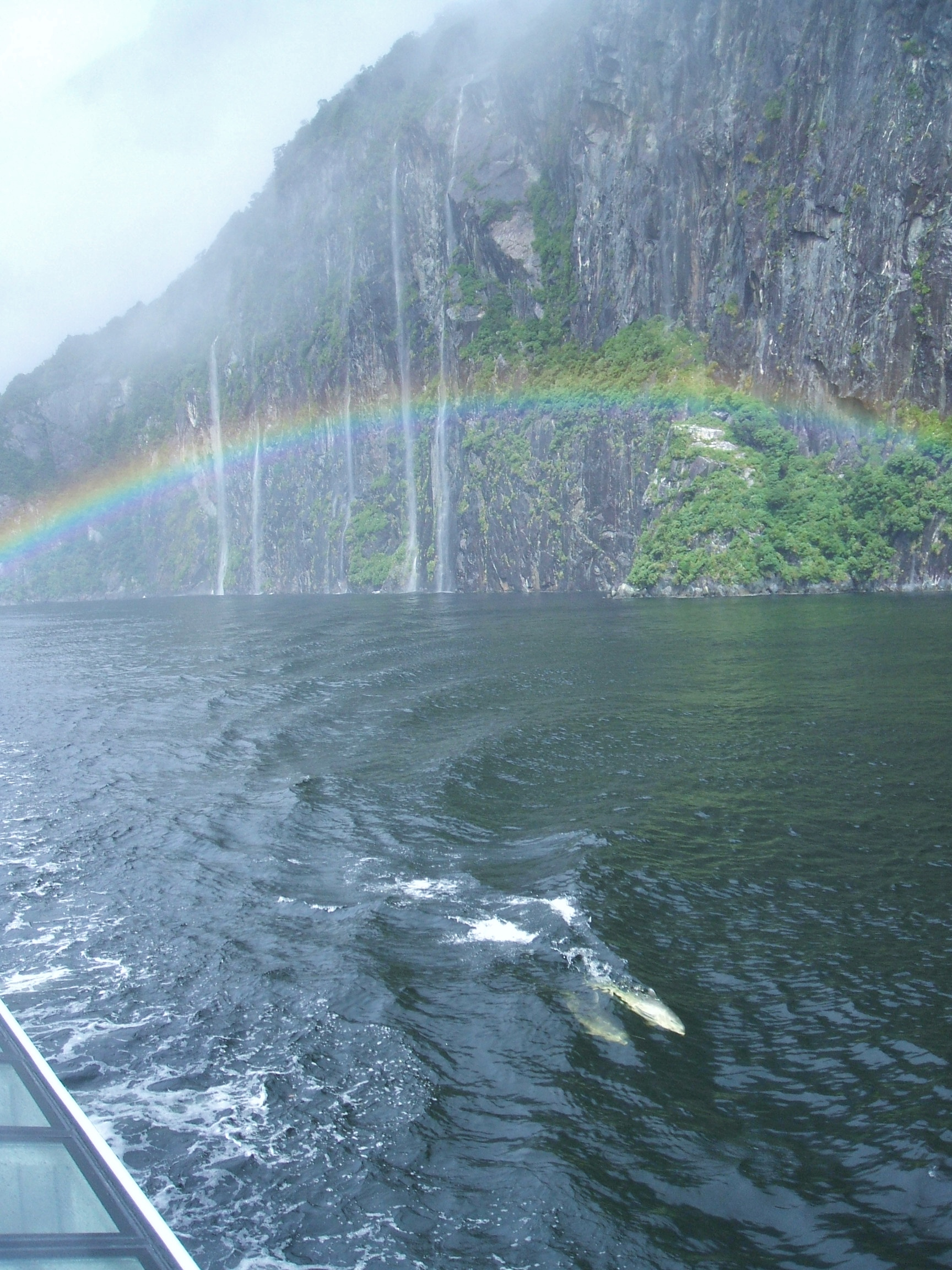
Bottlenose dolphins swim under a rainbow.

Milford Sound is home to a variety of marine mammals, including seals and the southernmost wild population of bottlenose dolphins. Whales, especially the humpback and southern right whales, are increasingly observed due to the recoveries of each species. Penguins are also common within the sound, which is a breeding site for the Fiordland penguin and has subsequently been identified as an Important Bird Area by BirdLife International.

As a result of Milford Sound's high rainfall and the density of saltwater, the surface of Milford Sound is a layer of freshwater containing tannins from the surrounding rainforest. This filters much of the sunlight which enters the water, allowing for a variety of Black coral to be found at depths of as shallow as 10 metres (33 ft), significantly closer to the surface than usual.

== History ==
Two swaggers boiling a billy of tea, Milford Sound by John H. Gibb, oil on canvas Christchurch 1886

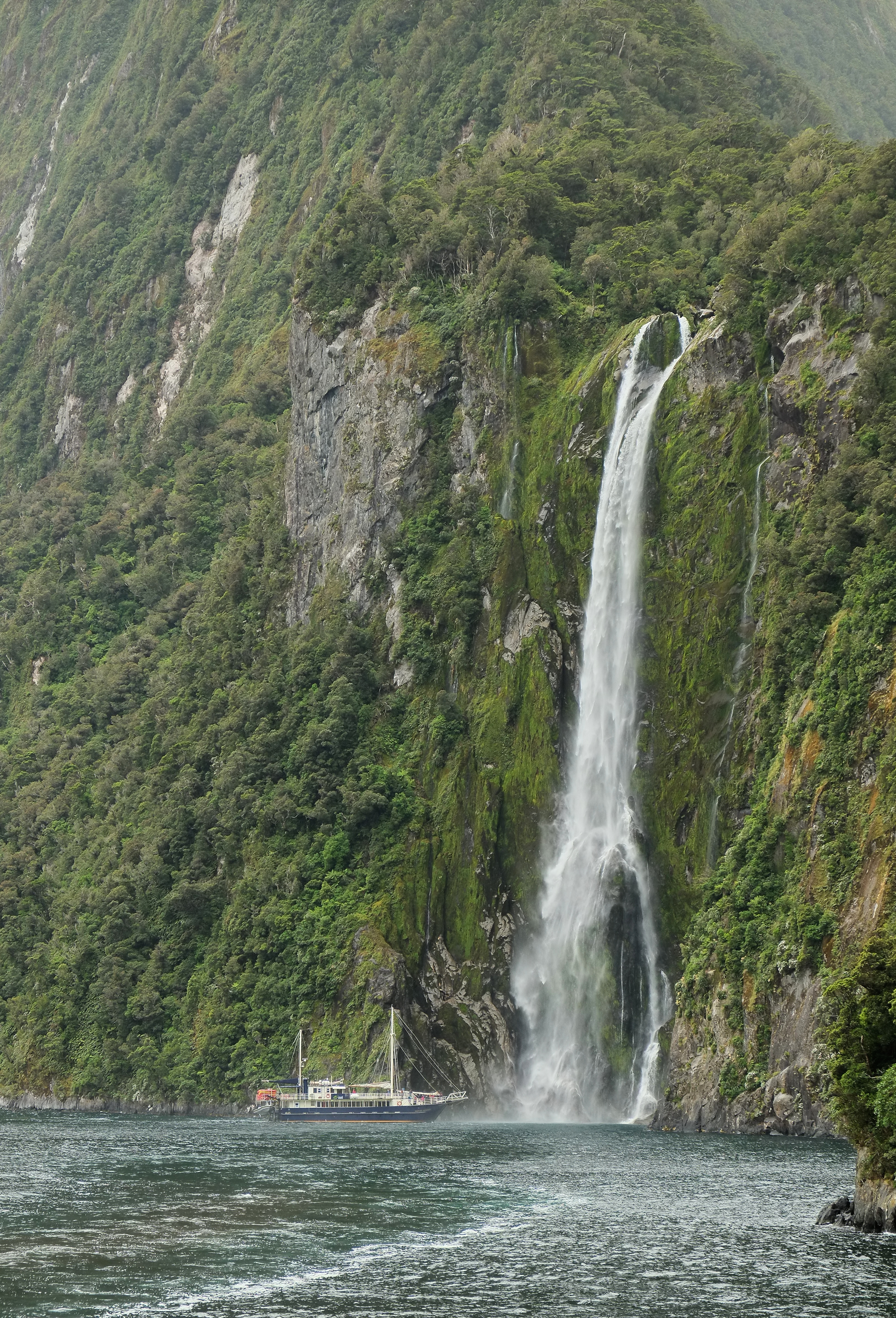
The 151-metre (495 ft) Stirling Falls were named after Frederick Stirling, Captain of HMS Clio.

European explorers initially overlooked Milford Sound because its narrow entry did not appear to lead into such large interior bays. Sailing ship captains such as James Cook, who bypassed Milford Sound on his journeys for just this reason, also feared venturing too close to the steep mountainsides, afraid that wind conditions would prevent escape.

The fiord was known to local Māori who had acquired a large amount of local marine knowledge, including tidal patterns and fish feeding patterns over generations before European arrival. A pounamu outcrop used for tools by the Māori is reportedly on one side or other of the fiord at Anita Bay but the stone was found to be inferior quality when later first mined by Europeans. The fiord remained unnoticed by Europeans until Captain John Grono discovered it c. 1812 and named it Milford Haven after his homeland in Wales. Captain John Lort Stokes later renamed Milford Haven as Milford Sound. In the deed of sale to the New Zealand Company in 1848, Milford Sound was misnamed as Whakatipu Waiti (or Whakatipa Waita on the deeds map), which was corrected in the purchase deed for Southland to Piopiotahi. Piopiotahi also refers to a torrent going into the fiord. Following the passage of the Ngāi Tahu Claims Settlement Act 1998, the name of the fiord was officially altered to Milford Sound / Piopiotahi.

While Fiordland as such remained one of the least-explored areas of New Zealand up to the 20th century, Milford Sound's natural beauty soon attracted national and international renown, and led to the discovery of the McKinnon Pass in 1888, soon to become a part of the new Milford Track, an early walking tourism trail. In the same year, the low watershed saddle between the Hollyford River and the Cleddau River was discovered. Sixty years later, this became the location for the Homer Tunnel, providing road access.

As of the 2006 census, 120 people lived in Milford Sound, most of them working in tourism or conservation.

== Tourism ==
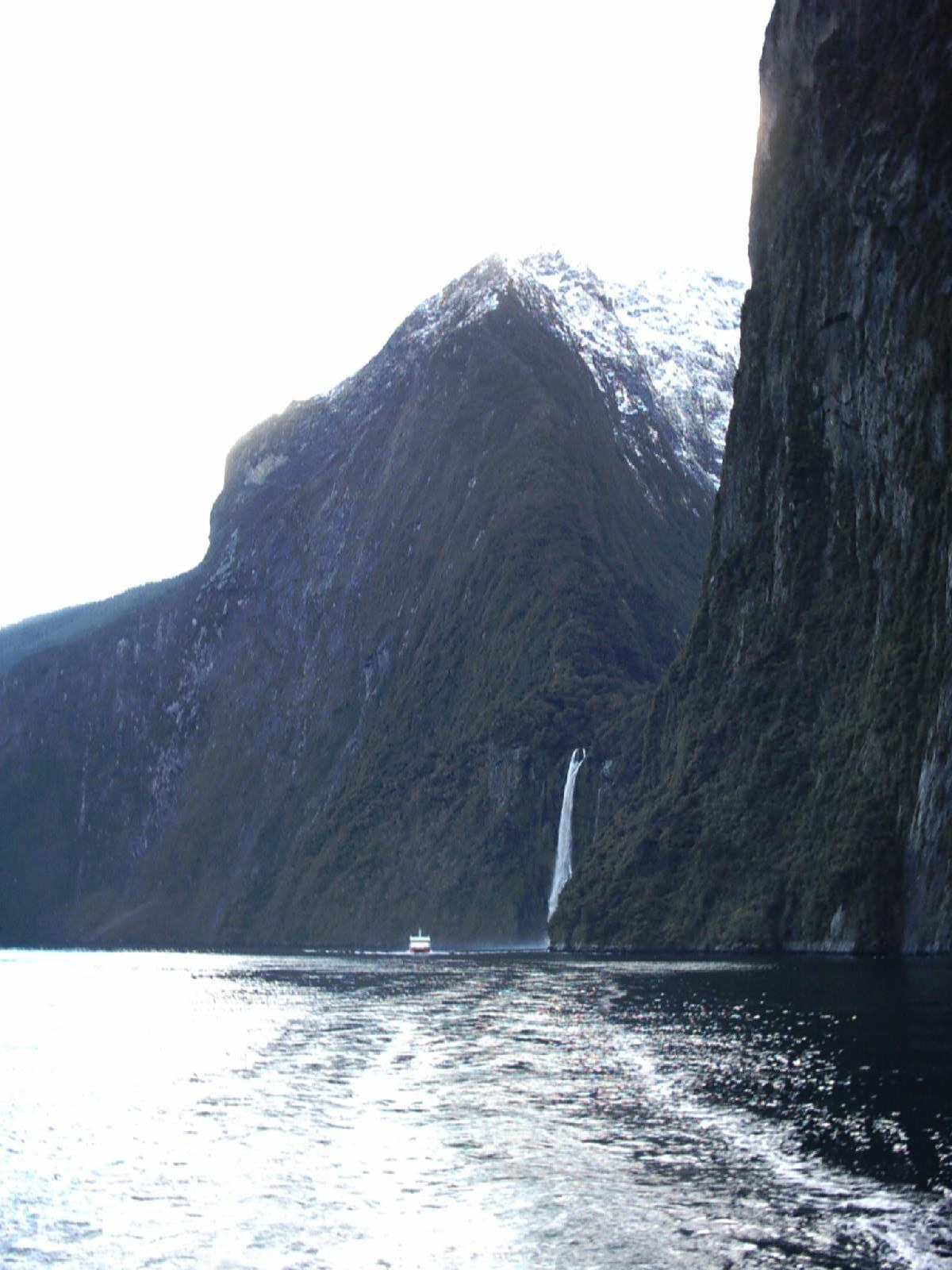
Cliffs and waterfalls after dry spell, with a two-storey tour boat providing relative size

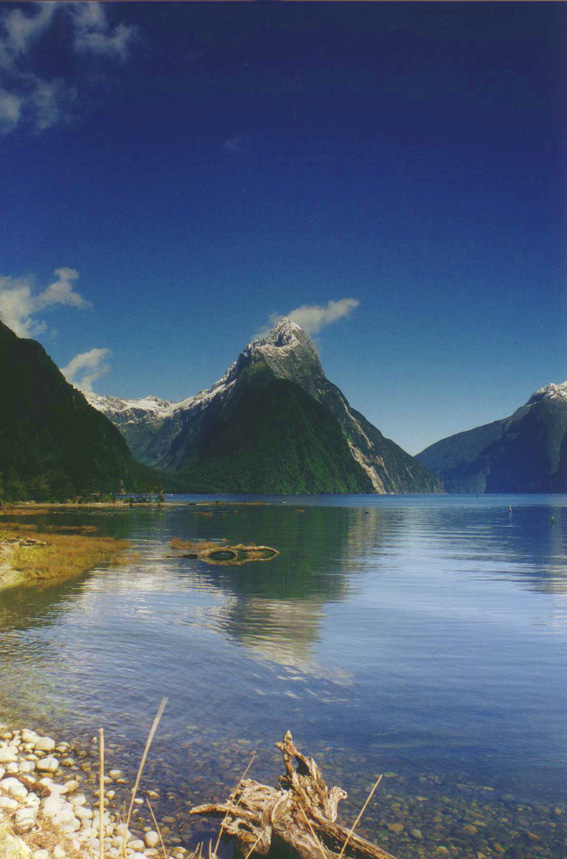
Mitre Peak, towering over Milford Sound

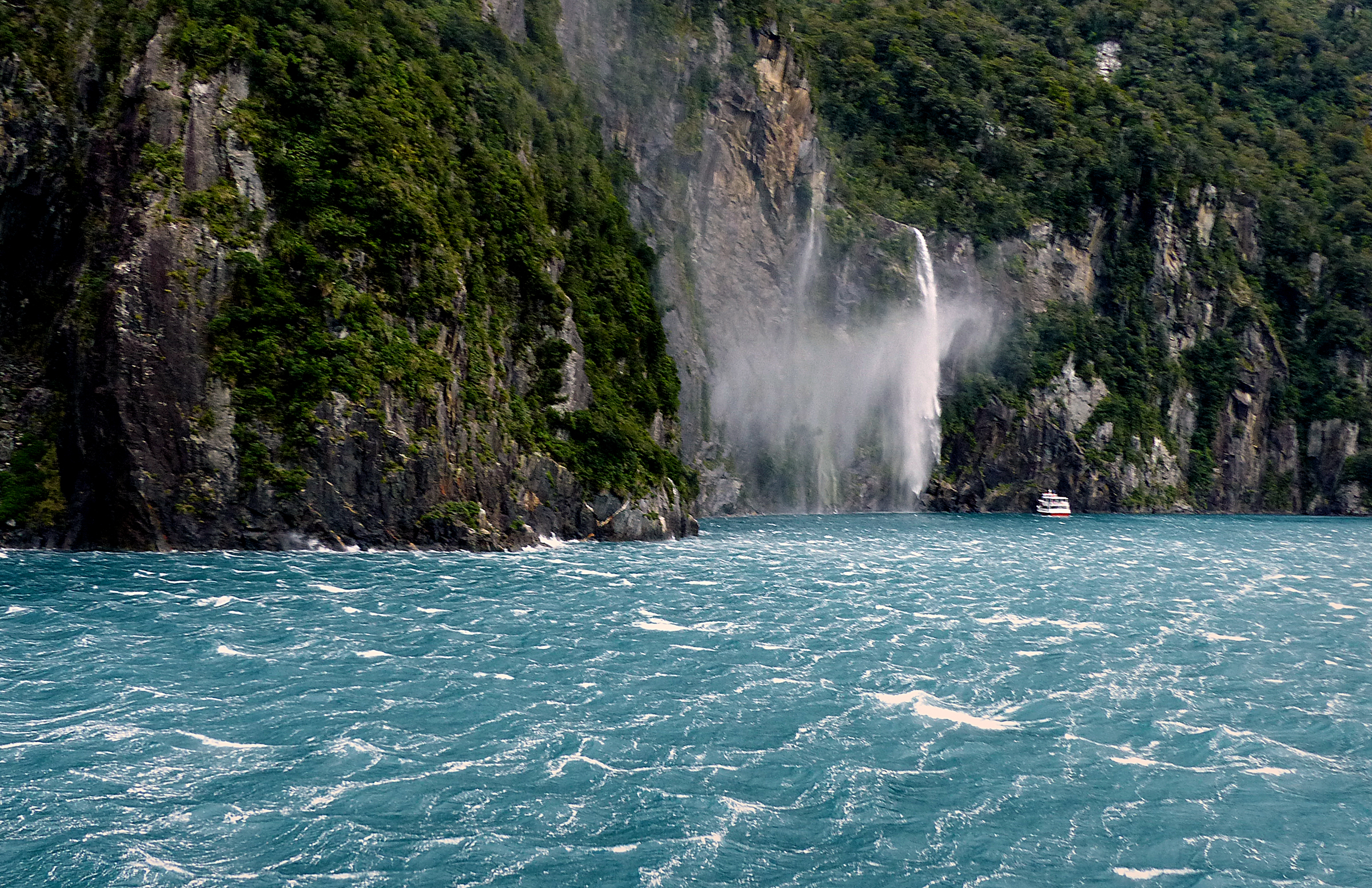
Waterfall at Milford Sound

=== Overview ===
Milford Sound attracts between 550,000 and 1 million visitors per year. This makes the sound one of New Zealand's most-visited tourist spots even with its remote location and long journey times from the nearest population centres. Many tourists take one of the boat tours, which usually last one to two hours. They are offered by several companies, departing from the Milford Sound Visitors' Centre.

Tramping, canoeing, and some other water sports are possible. A small number of companies also provide overnight boat trips. There is otherwise only limited accommodation at the sound, and only a tiny percentage of tourists stay more than one day. Tourists usually stay in Te Anau or Queenstown.

The Milford Discovery Centre & Underwater Observatory is located in Harrison's Cove on the north side of the fiord. Situated within the Piopiotahi Marine Reserve, the underwater observatory allows visitors to view the fiord's unique marine environment at a depth of 10 metres (33 ft). Due to a natural phenomenon called 'deep water emergence,' deep-water animals such as black coral can be viewed in the shallow waters surrounding the observatory. A dark surface layer of fresh water, stained brown by tannins from the surrounding forest, along with cold water temperatures, allows the black corals to grow close to the surface throughout Milford Sound and Fiordland.

Milford Sound is also a destination for cruise ships.

In 2025 the Minister for Conservation announced a proposal to charge international visitors a fee to access some of New Zealand's National Parks including Milford Sound. Under this proposed scheme, foreign visitors would be required to pay between NZ$20 (€10) and NZ$40 (€20) to access some natural landmarks. The proposal is estimated to generate up to NZ$62 million per year, to be invested in conservation sites throughout New Zealand. The proposed changes are not expected to come into effect until at least summer 2027.

=== Transport ===
By road, Milford Sound is 291 km (181 mi) from Queenstown and 278 km (173 mi) from Invercargill (about four hours' drive), with most of the tour buses to the sound departing from Queenstown. Some tourists also arrive from the smaller tourism centre of Te Anau, 121 km (75 mi) away. There are also scenic flights by light aircraft and helicopter tours to and from Milford Sound Airport. The drive to Milford Sound itself passes through unspoiled mountain landscapes before entering the 1.2 km (0.75 mi) Homer Tunnel which emerges into rain-forest-carpeted canyons that descend to the sound. The winding mountain road, while of high standards, is very prone to avalanches and closures during the winter half of the year.

The long distance to the sound means that tourist operators from Queenstown all depart very early in the day, arriving back only late in the evening. This means most tourists visit Milford Sound within a few hours of midday, leading to congestion on roads and at tourist facilities during the primary season. The peak-time demand is also why a large number of tour boats are active in the sound at about the same time.

Over the years, various options for shortening the distance to Milford Sound from Queenstown have been mooted, including a gondola route, a new tunnel from Queenstown, or a monorail from near Lake Wakatipu to Te Anau Downs. All would reduce the current round-trip duration (which has to travel via Te Anau), thus allowing tourism to be spread out over more of the day. While a gondola is considered out of the running after the New Zealand Department of Conservation (DOC) declined approval for environmental reasons, the tunnel and the monorail proposals have applied to the DOC for concessions for land access.

Several charter companies fly to Milford Sound. Most of the companies fly out of Queenstown International Airport.

== Diesel spill ==
On 8 February 2004, a spill of 13,000 litres (3,400 US gal) of diesel fuel was discovered, resulting in a 2-kilometre-long stretch that was closed for 2 days while intensive cleanup activities were completed. A hose was apparently used to displace the fuel from the tanks of one of the tour vessels. Various government officials claimed it appeared to be an act of ecoterrorism motivated by rising numbers of tourists to the park, though more details did not become known.

== Landslide hazard ==
Since the glacier that formed the fiord melted about 16,000 years ago, at least 16 large landslips greater than 1 Mm^{3} (3.5×10^{19} cu ft) in volume, have occurred at Milford Sound, and the potential for further landslips has risk significance due to the fiord's steep sides, confined waters, lack of realistic reaction time for evacuation and popularity as an international tourist destination. If a large landslip into the fiord occurs, likely triggered by an earthquake, it could create a large local tsunami, with a risk of potentially about 750 deaths if it occurred at peak tourist density in the middle of the day. Risk assessment has suggested 1-in-1000-year wave runup could be about 17 m (56 ft) arriving on shore within 2–7 minutes. The highest estimated historic displacement wave runup is about 100 m (330 ft) at the Cleddau delta at the head of the fiord with an event frequency of every 2000 years. Rupture of the far southern portion of the Alpine Fault, which passes across the head of the sound, has happened seven times in the last 2000 years with 27 events since 6000 BCE. There is a 75% probability in the next 50 years of a major Alpine Fault earthquake, and these have a 44% probability of generating a landslide-generated tsunami in the fiord. The probability of an earthquake of similar magnitude to the 1717 great earthquake of M_{w} 8.1± 0.1 occurring along the southern portion of the Alpine Fault within the next 50 years is estimated at 30%. There is also the potential for significant trigger earthquakes associated with the Fiordland subduction-zone's Puysegur Trench to the south.

References for Fig. 1: (Note: Landslips in the figure are as recorded in cores from Milford Sound. It is not only Alpine Fault earthquakes that are associated potentially with the large Milford Sound earthquakes. Only a minority of the large landslides found are likely to be spontaneous rainfall-related events. Sedimentary records offshore, for example, document many more major earthquakes than are assigned to the Alpine Fault, but as only a minority of the large landslips within the Milford Sound sedimentary record have been radiocarbon dated, a fully dated sequence does not exist. Tradiocarbon-dated landslips in red are shown as wider lines, but uncertainty in dating is not shown, although it is shown for Alpine Fault earthquakes that involved rupture across the mouth of the fiord.)

=== Risk context ===
Individual risk has been estimated for a visit in 2019 modelling as 6.8 × 10^{−7}, which is less than 1 in a million, and two orders of magnitude less than the now known risk of visiting Whakaari / White Island, an active volcano, as a tourist. However, the societal risk is higher than the level defined in the current New Zealand tourism culture after the 2019 Whakaari / White Island eruption, because Milford Sound is a much more popular tourist destination. The decision on whether to accept the recently defined societal risk and its possible consequences has been assigned to the New Zealand government.

== See also ==
- Doubtful Sound
- Dusky Sound
- Fiordland
- Milford Sound Airport
- Transport in Milford Sound
