= 1923 Birthday Honours =

British government recognitions

The King's Birthday Honours 1923 were appointments in many of the Commonwealth realms of King George V to various orders and honours to reward and highlight good works by citizens of those countries. The appointments were made to celebrate the official birthday of The King. They were published on 1 and 29 June 1923.

The recipients of honours are displayed here as they were styled before their new honour, and arranged by honour, with classes (Knight, Knight Grand Cross, etc.) and then divisions (Military, Civil, etc.) as appropriate.

== British Empire ==
=== Baron ===
- The Honourable Charles Napier Lawrence, chairman, London, Midland and Scottish Railway.
- The Honourable Herbert Cokayne Gibbs, JP, Chairman of the City of London Unionist Association. For public and political services.

=== Privy Councillor ===
- Montagu Collet Norman, DSO, Governor of the Bank of England.
- The Honourable Stanley Melbourne Bruce, MC, Prime Minister of the Commonwealth of Australia.
- The Honourable William Stevens Fielding, DCL , Minister of Finance, Canada.
- Lieutenant-Colonel George Abraham Gibbs, TD MP, Member of Parliament for Bristol (West) since 1906. Treasurer of HM's Household since 1921.
- Commander Bolton Meredith Eyres-Monsell, Royal Navy, JP MP, Member of Parliament for Evesham since January 1910, Civil Lord of the Admiralty, 1921–October 1922, Parliamentary and Financial Secretary to the Admiralty since October 1922.

=== Baronet ===
- Major-General Sir Anthony Alfred Bowlby, KCB KCMG KCVO FRCS, President of the Royal College of Surgeons.
- Thomas Hutchison, Lord Provost of Edinburgh.
- Sir William Plender, GBE JP. For public services.
- Henry Lesser Rothband. For public services.
- George Alfred Wills, JP. For public services.
- Sir William Watson Rutherford, JP, Member of Parliament for Edge Hill Division of Liverpool, 1903–1922.
- Major Arthur Clive Morrison-Bell, MP, Member of Parliament for Honiton since 1910.
- John Henry Brunel Noble,. For public services in the County of Northumberland.
- Sir Arthur John Dorman, KBE JP. For public services in Yorkshire.
- Sir William Hannay Raeburn, MP, Member of Parliament for Dumbartonshire since 1918.

=== Knight Bachelor ===
- Francis Robert Anderton, Late Chairman of the London County Council.
- George Francis Blacker, CBE FRCP FRCS, Dean of University College Hospital Medical School.
- George Dance. For public services.
- David Davis, JP, Lord Mayor of Birmingham.
- Lieutenant-Colonel Herbert Ellissen, CBE, Controller and Financial Adviser, Imperial War Graves Commission.
- Professor Hermann Gollancz, . In recognition of his contributions to learning.
- His Honour Judge Herbert William Lush-Wilson, KC JP DL. For public services.
- Henry Joseph Lynch, managing director of Messrs. Davidson, Pullen, Rio de Janeiro. Ex-president of Chamber of Commerce, Brazil.
- Lieutenant-Colonel Ewen John Maclean, FRCP FRCS JP. For services to the Ministry of Health in Wales.
- Arthur Copson Peake, JP, President of The Law Society.
- Professor William Matthew Flinders Petrie, FRS FBA DCL LLD LittD, Edwards Professor of Egyptology, University College, London.
- Arthur Scott Quekett, LLD, Parliamentary Draughtsman and Treasury Solicitor, Northern Ireland.
- Guy Stephenson, CB , Assistant Director of Public Prosecutions.
- John Fischer Williams, CBE KC, British Legal Representative on the Reparations Commission.
- Henry Maddocks, KC MP, Member of Parliament for Nuneaton since 1918.
- Lieutenant-Colonel Martin Archer-Shee, CMG DSO MP, Member of Parliament for Finsbury Central, January and December 1910, and Finsbury since 1918.
- Alfred Stephens JP. For public and political services in Carmarthenshire.
- George Henry Morse, JP. For public and political services in Norwich. Lord Mayor of Norwich 1923.
- Charles Ernest Leonard Lyle, JP, Member of Parliament for Stratford 1918–1922. Chairman of Queen Mary Hospital for the East End of London since 1915.
- Alderman Ernest Henry Cook, DSc, For public and political services in Bristol. Lord Mayor of Bristol 1921–22.
- John Priestman, JP. For public and political services in Sunderland.
- Daniel Thomas Keymer, OBE. For public and political services in Hackney.
- Herbert Lidiard. For public and political services in Paddington. Three times Mayor of Paddington.
- Major Frederic Arthur Kelley, OBE JP MP, Member of Parliament for Rotherham since 1918.
- Pomeroy Burton. For public services.
- Louis Frederick Pearson, CBE. For public and political services in Nottingham.
- Alderman Albert Edward Pritchard, JP. For public and political services in Wednesbury.
- Alderman Charles Henry Wilson, LLD JP. For public and political services in Leeds.

India

- Maurice Henry Weston Hayward, Indian Civil Service, Member of the Executive Council of the Governor of Bombay.
- Rai Bahadur Kurma Venkata Reddi Nayudu Garu, Minister for Development, Madras.
- Moropant Vishvanath Joshi, Member of the Executive Council of the Governor of the Central Provinces.
- Mr. Justice Hugh Walmsley, Indian Civil Service, Judge, High Court, Calcutta, Bengal.
- Mr. Justice Muhammad Rafiq, Puisne Judge, High Court, Allahabad, United Provinces.
- Ernest Albert Seymour Bell, CIE, Member, Railway Board.
- Edward Mitchener Cook, CSI CIE, Indian Civil Service, Secretary to the Government of India, Finance Department.
- Brigadier-General Charles Lane Magniac, CMG CBE, Agent, Madras and Southern Mahratta Railway, Madras.
- Hugh Trowbridge Keeling, CSI, Chief Engineer, Public Works Department, Delhi.
- Captain Thomas George Segrave, CBE, Royal Naval Reserve, in charge of the management of the Indian Prize Ships.
- Diwan Bahadur Sathappa Chettiar Ramanathan Chettiar Muthiah Chettiar Annainalai Chettiar Avargal, Banker, Madras.
- Rai Bahadur Gopal Das Bhandari, CIE MBE, Pleader and President, Municipal Committee, Amritsar, Punjab.
- Purshotamdas Thakurdas, CIE MBE, Merchant, Bombay.
- Adam Beattie Ritchie, Merchant, Messrs. Finlay, Fleming & Co., Burma.
- Hector William Gavin Mackenzie, FRCP, Senior Censor, Royal College of Physicians.
- Rayner Childe Barker, CIE, Director-in-Chief, Indo-European Telegraph Department, India Office.

Dominions, Colonies, Protectorates, etc.

- The Honourable Frederick Revans Chapman, Judge of the Supreme Court of New Zealand.
- William Herbert Daw, for services in connection with the Oversea Dominions.
- The Honourable Jean Etienne Reenen de Villiers, Judge President of the Orange Free State Provincial Division of the Supreme Court of South Africa.
- Charles James Griffin, Chief Justice of His Majesty's High Court of Uganda.
- George Handley Knibbs, CMG, Director of the Bureau of Science and Industry, Commonwealth of Australia.
- William Thorley Loton, of the City of Perth in the State of Western Australia, in recognition of his public services.
- James Comyn Macgregor, CMG, Resident Commissioner, Bechuanaland Protectorate.
- William Macintosh, of Port Elizabeth, Member of the House of Assembly of the Union of South Africa, in recognition of his public services.
- Ernest William Sanders Montagu, Secretary for Mines and, Works, Southern Rhodesia.
- Professor William John Ritchie Simpson, CMG MD, a Member of the Colonial Advisory Medical and Sanitary Committee.
- John Warren Swanson, Lord Mayor of the City of Melbourne, State of Victoria, in recognition of his public services.

=== Order of the Bath ===
==== Knight Grand Cross of the Order of the Bath (GCB) ====
Civil Division

- Sir Eyre Crowe, GCMG KCB, Permanent Under-Secretary of State for Foreign Affairs.

==== Knight Commander of the Order of the Bath (KCB) ====
Military Division

Royal Navy

- Vice-Admiral Sir Morgan Singer, KCVO CB.
- Vice-Admiral Sir Hugh Henry Darby Tothill, KCMG KCVO CB.

Army

- Major-General Charles Walker Robinson, CB, retired pay.
- Major-General Owen Edward Pennefather Lloyd, VC CB, retired pay, Colonel Commandant, Royal Army Medical Corps.
- Lieutenant-General Sir John Stuart Mackenzie Shea, KCMG CB DSO, Indian Army.

Royal Air Force

- Air Vice-Marshal Arthur Vyell Vyvyan, CB DSO.

Civil Division

- Holberry Mensforth, CBE MSc(Techn) MIME, Director-General of Factories, War Office.

==== Companion of the Order of the Bath (CB) ====
Military Division

Royal Navy

- Rear-Admiral David Murray Anderson, CMG MVO.
- Captain (Commodore, 2nd class) Alan Hotham, CMG.
- Captain Charles Andrew Fountaine.
- Captain Francis Arthur Marten, CMG CVO.
- Surgeon Rear-Admiral Joseph Chambers, CMG MB BA.
- Colonel Reginald Cecil Temple, OBE, Royal Marine Artillery.

Army

- Major-General Arthur Grenfell Wauchope, CMG CIE DSO.
- Colonel Anthony Hudson Woodifield, CMG OBE, assistant director of Ordnance Services, the British Army of the Rhine.
- Colonel Howard Alan Denholm Fraser, Commanding Royal Engineers, Peshawar District, India.
- Lieutenant-Colonel and Brevet Colonel Alfred Edgar Glasgow, CMG DSO, Commanding 2nd Battalion, The Royal Sussex Regiment.
- Colonel Cecil De Sausmarez, CMG DSO, Officer in charge of Records, Royal Garrison Artillery.
- Colonel Julian Mayne Young, CMG DSO, Assistant Quartermaster-General, Aldershot Command.
- Major-General Arthur Le Grand Jacob, CMG CIE DSO, Indian Army, General Officer Commanding, Kohat District, India.
- Colonel Walter Holland Ogilvie, CMG MB, Indian Medical Service, assistant director of Medical Services, Presidency and Assam District, India.
- Colonel (temporary Colonel Commandant) Etienne Ronald Partridge Boileau, CIE CBE, Indian Army, Brigade Commander, 11th Indian Infantry Brigade.
- Colonel (temporary Colonel Commandant) Harry Ross, CIE DSO, Indian Army, Commander, Rangoon Brigade Area, Southern Command, India.
- Colonel Arthur William Hamilton May Moens, CMG DSO, Indian Army, General Staff, Officer, 1st Grade, India Office.
- Colonel Edward Thomas Humphreys, CMG DSO, for valuable services rendered in connection with military operations in Malabar, 1921-1922.

Royal Air Force

- Air Commodore Charles Alexander Holcombe Longcroft, CMG DSO AFC.

Civil Division

- Robert John Thompson, OBE FSS, Assistant Secretary, Ministry of Agriculture.
- Captain John McInnes Borland, DSO RD, Royal Naval Reserve.
- William McClelland, OBE MIEE.
- Lieutenant-Colonel and Honorary Colonel Thomas Stokes George Hugh Robertson Aikman, late Commanding 4th Battalion (Militia), The Highland Light Infantry.
- Colonel Sir Robert Drummond Moncreiffe, Bt CMG VD TD ADC, Honorary Colonel, 6th/7th (Perth & Fife) Battalion, The Black Watch (Royal Highlanders), Territorial Army.
- Brevet Colonel Robert William Herbert Watkin Williams-Wynn, DSO TD DL, Honorary Colonel, 61st (Carnarvon & Denbigh Yeomanry) Brigade, Royal Garrison Artillery, Territorial Army.
- Lieutenant-Colonel the Honourable Charles John Coventry, TD, Commanding 100th (Worcestershire & Oxfordshire Yeomanry) Brigade, Royal Field Artillery, Territorial Army.
- Colonel George Ralph Charles, Baron Harlech, TD, Chairman of the Shropshire Territorial Army County Association.

=== Order of the Star of India ===
==== Knight Grand Commander (GCSI) ====
- His Highness Lieutenant-Colonel Maharaja Shri Sir Ranjitsinhji Vibhaji, GBE KCSI, Maharaja Jam Sahib of Nawanagar, Bombay.

==== Knight Commander (KCSI) ====
- Rao Bahadur Bayya Narasimheswara Sarma, Member of the Executive Council of the Governor-General.
- Sir Ibrahim Rahimtoola, CIE, Member of the Executive Council, Bombay.

==== Companion (CSI) ====
- Maharaja Shri Fateh Singh, Home Member of Council, Jodhpur State, Rajputana.
- John Hullah, Indian Civil Service, Secretary to the Government of India, Department of Revenue and Agriculture.
- Steuart Edmund Pears, CIE, Resident, Waziristan, North West Frontier Province.
- John Campbell, OBE, Indian Civil Service, Representative of the Government of India on the Opium Advisory Committee of the League of Nations.
- George Frederick Paddison, Indian Civil Service, Commissioner of Labour, Madras.
- James Milne, lately serving with the Inchcape Committee.

=== Order of Saint Michael and Saint George ===
==== Knight Grand Cross of the Order of St Michael and St George (GCMG) ====
- His Excellency the Right Honourable Sir Charles Norton Edgcumbe Eliot, KCMG CB, His Majesty's Ambassador Extraordinary and Plenipotentiary at Tokio.

==== Knight Commander of the Order of St Michael and St George (KCMG) ====
- Laurence Nunns Guillemard, KCB, Governor and Commander-in-Chief of the Straits Settlements and their Dependencies.
- Malcolm Stevenson, CMG, High Commissioner and Commander-in-Chief of the Island of Cyprus.
- The Honourable John George Bice, Member of the Legislative Council, Chief Secretary and Minister of Marine of the State of South Australia.
- Charles Thomas Davis, CMG, Assistant Under-Secretary of State, Colonial Office.
- James William Jamieson, CMG, His Majesty's Consul-General at Canton.

==== Companion of the Order of St Michael and St George (CMG) ====
- John Ernest Adamson, Director of Education for the Province of Transvaal, Union of South Africa.
- David Alexander, Director of Medical and Sanitary services, Gold Coast Colony.
- John Henry Butters, MBE, Chief Engineer and General Manager, Hydro Electric Department, State of Tasmania.
- Captain Thomas Edward Donne, Secretary, Office of the High Commissioner in London for New Zealand.
- Percy Hubert Ezechiel, one of the Crown Agents for the Colonies.
- The Reverend Robert Laws, DD MD, Principal of the Livingstonia Mission, Nyasaland Protectorate, in recognition of his public services.
- William Stewart Mowle, Clerk of the Legislative Assembly of the State of New South Wales.
- Major Cecil William Chase Parr, OBE, British Resident, Perak, Federated Malay States.
- Brevet Lieutenant-Colonel Thomas Reginald St. Johnston, Colonial Secretary of the Leeward Islands.
- John Scott, Deputy Chief Secretary to the Government of Nigeria.
- Samuel Henry Slater, CIE, Adviser to the Ministry of Finance, Iraq Government.
- James William Tibbs, lately Headmaster of the Auckland Grammar School in the Dominion of New Zealand, in recognition of services to Education.
- Thomas Trumble, CBE, Secretary to the Department of Defence, Commonwealth of Australia.
- Charles Henry Bentinck, Counsellor at His Majesty's Legation at Athens.
- Nevile Meyrick Henderson, Counsellor to His Majesty's High Commission at Constantinople.
- Gerald Campbell, His Majesty's Consul General at San Francisco.

Honorary Companion

- His Highness Tunku Mahmud ibni Almerhum Sultan Ahmad Tajudin, vice-president of the State Council, Kedah, Malay States.

=== Order of the Indian Empire ===
==== Knight Grand Commander (GCIE) ====
- Sir Reginald Henry Craddock, KCSI, late Lieutenant-Governor of Burma.

==== Knight Commander (KCIE) ====
- Henry Fraser Howard, CSI CIE, late Controller of Finance, India Office, and Secretary to the Inchcape Committee.

==== Companion (CIE) ====
- Khan Bahadur Diwan Abdul Hamid, OBE, Chief Minister, Kapurthala State, Punjab.
- Rao Bahadur Thakur Hari Singh, OBE, Military Member, State Council, Bikaner, Rajputana.
- Wilfred Alder, OBE, Indian Civil Service, Officiating Auditor-General, Government of India, Finance Department.
- James Rea Martin, Indian Civil Service, Secretary, Development Department, Bombay.
- David George Mitchell, Indian Civil Service, lately Secretary to Government, Legal Department, and Secretary to the Legislative Council, Central Provinces.
- Eardley Garforth Bryan Peel, His Majesty's Consul at Ahwaz, Persian Gulf.
- Francis Farquhar Sladen, Indian Civil Service, Deputy Commissioner, United Provinces.
- Lieutenant-Colonel Richard Henry Chenevix-Trench, OBE, Political Agent in Zhob, Baluchistan.
- Albert Frederic Lucas Brayne, Indian Civil Service, Officer on Special Duty, Government of India, Finance Department.
- Eric Charles Handyside, OBE, Officiating Commandant, Frontier Constabulary, North West Frontier Force.
- Cecil Guy Barnett, Superintending Engineer, Burma, formerly Executive and Superintending Engineer, Delhi New Capital Works.
- Lieutenant-Colonel Asher Leventon, Indian Medical Service, Superintendent, Campbell Medical School and Hospital, Bengal.
- Lieutenant-Colonel Thomas Hunter, Indian Medical Service, Civil Surgeon, Lucknow, United Provinces.
- Lieutenant-Colonel Robert McCarrison, Indian Medical Service, on deputation to the Medical Research Department, India.
- Joseph William Bhore, CBE, Indian Civil Service, Secretary to the High Commissioner for India in the United Kingdom, lately acting as High Commissioner.
- Harry Graham Haig, Indian Civil Service, late Secretary, Indian Fiscal Commission.
- Khan Bahadur Muhammad Bazlullah Sahib, OBE, Commissioner of the Corporation of Madras.
- Reginald Maitland Maxwell, Indian Civil Service, Bombay.
- James Herbert Hechle, late Registrar, High Court (Original Side), Bengal.
- Major David Patrick Johnstone, OBE, Surgeon to His Excellency the Governor of Madras.
- Khan Bahadur Muhammad Sher Baz Khan, Honorary Magistrate, Lahore District, Punjab.
- Khan Bahadur Mian Muhammad Hayat Khan, Kureshi, of Sobbowal, Honorary Magistrate, Shahpur District, Punjab.
- The Reverend George Dunsford Barne, OBE, Principal, Lawrence Royal Military School, Sanawar (2nd in Command, Simla Rifles Auxiliary Force, India), Punjab.
- John Evershed, Director of the Kodaikanal Observatory, Madras.
- Saw Hke, Sawba of Hsipaw, Burma.

=== Royal Victorian Order ===
==== Knight Grand Cross of the Royal Victorian Order (GCVO) ====
- His Highness Aga Sultan Sir Mahomed Shah Aga Khan, GCSI GCIE (dated 30 May 1923.)
- The Right Honourable Reginald, Earl of Meath, KP GBE.
- The Right Honourable Andrew, Baron Dunedin, KCVO.

==== Knight Commander of the Royal Victorian Order (KCVO) ====
- Arthur, Viscount Valentia, CB MVO.

==== Commander of the Royal Victorian Order (CVO) ====
- Lieutenant-Colonel John Chaytor Brinton, DSO MVO.
- Philip Colville Smith.

==== Member of the Royal Victorian Order, 4th class (MVO) ====
- The Honourable Montague Charles Eliot, OBE.
- Major Richard Hasell Sheepshanks, DSO, 5th King Edward's Own Probyn's Horse.
- Herbert Arthur Previté Trendell, OBE MVO.
- Major Henry Hudson Fraser Stockley, OBE.
- Harry Clifford Longden, MVO.
- John Lombard Hobson.
- Henry Linnington Martyn, FRCS (Eng)
- Herbert Mitchell.
- Frederic Jeune Willans, MRCS (Eng) (dated 3 February 1923.)

==== Member of the Royal Victorian Order, 5th class (MVO) ====
- Jean Marie Claud Barlerin.
- Charles Coleman.
- Edward Septimus Courroux.
- Henry John Thomas Joist.

=== Order of the British Empire ===
==== Knight Grand Cross of the Order of the British Empire (GBE) ====
Civil Division

- Sir William Guy Granet. For public services.
- Sir Harry Harling Lamb, KCMG, until recently His Majesty's Consul-General at Smyrna.
- Major-General Sir Lee Oliver Fitzmaurice Stack, KBE CMG, Governor-General of the Sudan.

==== Dame Commander of the Order of the British Empire (DBE) ====
Civil Division

- Barbara, Lady Strickland. For public service, 1919–1922.
- Belle, Lady Cox, OBE, for services in Iraq.

==== Knight Commander of the Order of the British Empire (KBE) ====
Military Division

Royal Navy

- Vice-Admiral Thomas Jackson, CB MVO.

Army

- Colonel Ivo Lucius Beresford Vesey, CB CMG DSO.
- Colonel Reginald Seaburne May, CB CMG DSO.
- Major-General John Theodosius Burnett-Stuart, CB CMG DSO, for valuable services rendered in connection with military operations in Malabar, 1921-1922.

Civil Division

- Arthur Balfour, JP. In recognition of his public services. President of Association of British Chambers of Commerce. Member of the Grand Council of the Federation of British Industries.
- Walter Schroder, Coroner for Central London.
- Percy Crosland Tempest, CBE, General Manager, Southern Railway.
- Major-General Wilkinson Dent Bird, CB CMG DSO, late Lieutenant-Governor and Secretary, Royal Hospital Chelsea.
- Colonel (Honorary Major-General) Ernest Dunlop Swinton, CB DSO (retired pay).
- Horace Dickinson Nugent, CMG, His Majesty's Consul-General at Chicago, on retirement from the Consular Service.
- Harry Gloster Armstrong, His Majesty's Consul-General at New York.
- William Ford Coaker, lately Minister of Marine and Fisheries, Newfoundland, in recognition of his public services.
- The Honourable Arthur Alfred Clement Cocks, Colonial Treasurer of the State of New South Wales.
- Hugh Denison, of the City of Sydney, in recognition of his public services to the Commonwealth of Australia.
- Alfred Theodore Hennessy, of the City of Cape Town, in recognition of his public services to the Union of South Africa.
- The Honourable William Murray McPherson, Treasurer of the State of Victoria.
- Robert Howard Nolan, CBE, of the City of Auckland, Dominion of New Zealand, in recognition of his public services.
- Claud Severn, CMG, Colonial Secretary, Hong Kong.

==== Commander of the Order of the British Empire (CBE) ====
Military Division

Royal Navy

- Paymaster Captain Kenneth Sydney Hay.

Army

- Lieutenant-Colonel John Brown, DSO TD, 4th Battalion (Territorial), The Northamptonshire Regiment.
- Colonel Ronald Bruce Campbell, DSO.
- Colonel Edward Henry Eley, CMG DSO TD, Territorial Army.
- Colonel (temporary Colonel Commandant) Bonham Faunce.
- Major and Brevet Lieutenant-Colonel (temporary Colonel) Leonard Kirke Smith, DSO, The Royal Scots, attached Egyptian Army.
- Colonel John Beatson Bell, Indian Army.
- Colonel (temporary Colonel on the Staff) George Montague Philip Hawthorn, DSO, Inspector-General of the King's African Rifles.
- Lieutenant-Colonel (local Colonel) Austin Hubert Wightwick Haywood, CMG DSO, Royal Artillery, Inspector-General of the West African Frontier Force.
- Major Robert Douglas Johnston, The Hampshire Regiment.
- Major Basil Gerard Peel, DSO, 1st Madras Pioneers, Indian Army.
- Major Ernest Steuart Weldon, DSO, The Dorsetshire Regiment.
- Lieutenant-Colonel Ernest Robert Caldwell Wyatt, DSO, 4th Hazara Pioneers, Indian Army.

Royal Air Force

- Air Commodore Frederick Crosby Halahan, CMG DSO MVO.

Civil Division

- Max Julius Bonn. For services in connection with juvenile employment.
- Lieutenant-Colonel John Southey Bostock, MB ChB, Director of Medical Service, Ministry of Pensions.
- Frederick Gatus Bowers, OBE, Accountant General, Ministry of Labour.
- David Caird, Director of Information Section, War Office.
- Colonel Robert Clark, OBE DL VD JP, Chairman of City of Edinburgh Territorial County Association.
- Harold Claughton, OBE, Secretary of Disposal and Liquidation Commission.
- Charles Henry Colson, OBE, deputy director of Works, Admiralty.
- John Ainsworth Dale, Permanent Secretary, Ministry of Labour, Northern Ireland.
- The Reverend Canon Frederick Charles Davies,. In recognition of his public services as vice-chairman of the Consultative Council on National Health Insurance.
- Rachael Annie Cox-Davies, Late Matron, Royal Free Hospital, and late Principal Matron of the Territorial Army Nursing Service. Member of General Nursing Council.
- Walter Davies, JP, chairman, Manchester Hospitals Voluntary Committee.
- Francis Lindsay Fisher, FCA, Member of Disposal Board.
- Walter Miller Gaul, Assistant Secretary, War Office.
- John Fitzhugh Gelston, Deputy Inspector General and Commissioner of Police, Northern Ireland.
- James Scott Gordon, OBE , Permanent Secretary, Ministry of Agriculture, Northern Ireland.
- Douglas Houstoun, Solicitor to HM Duchy of Lancaster.
- William Henry Kendal, OBE, Secretary of the Office of Commissioner of Metropolitan Police.
- John Lee, Controller of Central Telegraph Office, General Post Office.
- Gertrude Margaret McCowan, JP. For public services in Glasgow and the West of Scotland.
- Lewis McQuibban, OBE, Permanent Secretary, Ministry of Education, Northern Ireland.
- William Thomas Madden, OBE. In recognition of his services as Honorary Manager, State Liquor Undertaking at Enfield from 1916 to 1922.
- Alderman Charles Henry Margrett, JP. For public services.
- George Torrance Milne, OBE, Senior Trade Commissioner, Montreal.
- Ernest Tom Neathercoat, JP, President of the Pharmaceutical Society. In recognition of his services in connection with Dangerous Drugs Regulations.
- Agnes Helen Harty (Agnes Nicholls), A leading Soprano in both Oratorio and Opera.
- Francis George Nutt, OBE, Assistant Secretary, Air Ministry.
- Walter Peel, OBE, JP, Member of the Central Advisory Committee, Ministry of Pensions. For public services.
- Herbert Ward, Chief Inspector of Training College, Board of Education.
- Samuel Watt, CB, Permanent Secretary, Ministry of Home Affairs, Northern Ireland.
- Francis Bernard Bourdillon, a Member of the Upper Silesian Plebiscite Commission.
- Captain Ulick de Burgh Charles, Commercial Secretary (Grade I) at His Majesty's Embassy at Madrid.
- Reginald Gerard Leigh, OBE, Assistant Private Secretary to the Secretary of State for Foreign Affairs.
- Lieutenant-Colonel James Procter, for valuable services in connection with the relief of refugees from Russia and Anatolia.
- Hubert Wilberforce Wilson, OBE, His Majesty's Consul-General at Buenos Aires.
- Laurence Frederic Rushbrook Williams, OBE.
- Jamsetji Framjee Madan, OBE, Merchant, Bengal.
- Alexander Richard Chancellor, Inspector-General of Police and Official Member of the Legislative Council, Straits Settlements.
- James Richard Collins, CMG, Secretary to the Treasury, Commonwealth of Australia.
- Edwin Mortimer Drower, Adviser to the Ministry of Justice, Iraq.
- John Thomas Easterbrook, of Manly, New South Wales, in recognition of his services to the Commonwealth of Australia.
- Honorary Colonel Edward James Hayward, VD, formerly Officer Commanding Ceylon Garrison Artillery.
- Cornewall Lewis Warwickshire Mansergh, ISO, lately Secretary of the Provincial Council of the Cape of Good Hope.
- Major Robert McKeeman Oakley, VD, Deputy Comptroller-General, Department of Trade and Customs, Commonwealth of Australia.
- Arthur James Philbrick, Chief Commissioner, Northern Territories, Gold Coast.
- Reginald Arthur Roberts, Senior Resident, Southern Provinces, Nigeria.
- Alfred Allen Simpson, of the City of Adelaide, in recognition of his public services to the Commonwealth of Australia.

Honorary Commander

- His Highness Syed Alwi ibni Almerhum Syed Safi, Raja of Perlis, Malay States.

==== Officer of the Order of the British Empire (OBE) ====
Military Division

Royal Navy

- Engineer Commander Ernest William Roberts.

Army

- Major and Brevet Lieutenant-Colonel Ralph Bignell Ainsworth, DSO, Royal Army Medical Corps.
- Lieutenant-Colonel Alleyne Percival Boxall, TD, 57th (Home Counties) Brigade, Royal Field Artillery, Territorial Army.
- Commissary of Ordnance and Major Frederic Harold Buckland, Royal Army Ordnance Corps.
- Lieutenant-Colonel St. John Augustus Cox, CMG, Extra Regimentally Employed List.
- Quartermaster and Major Edward Henry Dinham, The Gloucestershire Regiment.
- Deputy Commissary of Ordnance and Captain (temporary Major) John William Dunne, Royal Army Ordnance Corps.
- Lieutenant-Colonel Frecheville Hubert Ballantine-Dykes, DSO, 5th Battalion (Territorial), The Border Regiment (Major, Regular Army Reserve of Officers).
- Major Frederick William Fraser, TD, 4th Battalion (Territorial), The Cameron Highlanders.
- Major Algernon Clement Fuller, Royal Corps of Signals.
- Lieutenant-Colonel Thomas Francis Goode, TD, 48th (South Midland) Divisional Train, Royal Army Service Corps, Territorial Army.
- Lieutenant-Colonel Charles Francis Hill Greenwood, DSO TD, 22nd London Regiment, Territorial Army.
- Quartermaster and Lieutenant-Colonel Ernest Thomas Hynes, DSO, Extra Regimentally Employed List.
- Captain and Brevet Major (temporary Lieutenant-Colonel) Lionel Manton, DSO, Royal Engineers.
- Inspector of Ordnance Machinery, 1st Class, and Major Bertie Howard Penn, DSO, Royal Army Ordnance Corps (employed Tank Corps).
- Quartermaster and Major Edward Pickard, DCM, The Green Howards.
- Lieutenant-Colonel Stanley Rimmer, TD, 89th (3rd West Lancashire) Brigade, Royal Field Artillery, Territorial Army.
- Lieutenant-Colonel John Ridley Ritson, TD, 8th Battalion (Territorial), The Durham Light Infantry.
- Captain George Lewis Stanley Smith, MC, Royal Garrison Artillery.
- Major (local Lieutenant-Colonel) Drummond Cospatrick Spencer-Smith, Royal Artillery.
- Captain Frederick Noble Syms, 5th Battalion (Territorial), The Northumberland Fusiliers.
- Captain George Vere Taylor, DSO, The Norfolk Regiment.
- Winifred Mary Aldridge, RRC, Senior Nursing Sister, Queen Alexandra's Military Nursing Service for India.
- Captain John Clark, 3rd Battalion, 18th Royal Garhwal Rifles, Indian Army.
- Lieutenant-Colonel Gerard Irvine Davys,, Indian Medical Service.
- Captain (temporary Major) Arthur Friedrich Rawson Lumby, 2nd Battalion, 2nd Punjab Regiment, Indian Army.
- Major Frank Alan Macartney, MC, 3rd Battalion, 12th Frontier Force Regiment, Indian Army.
- Major David Guy Porteous, 2nd Battalion, 8th Punjab Regiment, Indian Army.
- Captain Evelyn Seigfried MacLeod Prinsep, 5th Probyns Horse, Indian Army.
- Major Henry Jocelyn Kennedy Wallis, 9th Royal Deccan Horse, Indian Army.
- Captain and Brevet Major Victor Charles Micallef, Royal Malta Artillery, Colonial Aide-de-Camp to the Governor and Commander-in-Chief of Malta and its Dependencies.

Royal Air Force

- Squadron Leader Lionel Douglas Dalzell McKean.
- Flight Lieutenant Francis John Linnell.
- Flight Lieutenant Christopher Thomas O'Neill, MB.

Civil Division

- Harold Frederic Andorsen, Parliamentary and General Branch, Disposals Board.
- John William Bloe, FSA, Senior Investigator, Royal Commission on Historical Monuments.
- Frederick Ambrose Britten, County Inspector, Royal Ulster Constabulary.
- Oscar Browning, Scholar and author.
- Alfred William Clapham, FSA, Technical Editor, Royal Commission on Historical Monuments.
- David Lionel Clarke, Accountant, Ministry of Home Affairs, Northern Ireland.
- George Eades, deputy director of Stores and Transport, Disposals Board.
- Richard Dale Winnett Harrison, County Inspector, Royal Ulster Constabulary.
- John Blake Harrold, MBE, Registrar-General of Shipping, Board of Trade.
- Major David Alfred William Ker, County Commandant, Royal Ulster Constabulary.
- Henry Benson Wyndham Ball Lenthall, County Inspector, Royal Ulster Constabulary.
- John McNally, County Inspector, Royal Ulster Constabulary.
- Captain Cyril Hamley Petherick, Principal Clerk, Ministry of Finance, Northern Ireland.
- Bertram Roskruge Seagrave, Principal, HM Office of Works.
- Charles James Gerrard Tate, Controller, Pension Issue Office, Ministry of Pensions.
- Matthew Tearle, Secretary, Cardiff Branch of Sailors' and Firemen's Union. For public services.
- William Donald McDonald Cruickshank, a Member of the Upper Silesian Plebiscite Commission.
- Reginald Eustace Richard Chandos Brinsley Richards, an assistant director at the Department of Overseas Trade.
- Leonard Arthur de Lacey Meredith, a Senior Intelligence Officer at the Department of Overseas Trade.
- Ernest Gabriel Lomas, His Majesty's Consul at Rabat.
- Thomas Emanuel Kavanagh Cormac, honorary Legal Adviser to His Majesty's Consulate-General at San Francisco.
- Robert William Urquhart, His Majesty's Vice-Consul at Smyrna.
- Charles Buckmaster, Foreign Office.
- Mary Birch Mitchell, MBE, Foreign Office.
- Philip Crawford Vickery, of the Punjab Police.
- Khan Bahadur Sardar Liakat Hayat Khan, Superintendent of Police in the Punjab.
- Rao Bahadur Keshav Vithal Kokje, Honorary Deputy Superintendent of Police, Criminal Investigation Department, Bombay.
- Robin Lescher, Planter, Madras.
- Charles Frederick Belcher, MBE, Attorney-General, Nyasaland Protectorate.
- Major Frederick William Bewsher, DSO MC, Commandant of the Palestine Gendarmerie.
- Captain Robert Ernest Cheesman, Private Secretary to the High Commissioner for Iraq.
- Charles Francis Clarkson, Member of the Provincial Council of Natal, Union of South Africa.
- Leonard Hawthorn Darlot, in recognition of his public services to the State of Western Australia.
- Edwin Evans, assistant director of Education, Ceylon, in recognition of his services to Education.
- Frederick William Flanagan, Permanent Head of the Valuation Department, Dominion of New Zealand.
- Captain Thomas John Hallinan, Royal Army Medical Corps, Medical Officer of Health, Basra.
- Eldon Harvey, Medical Superintendent of the Lunatic Asylum and Health Officer, Western District, Bermuda.
- Joseph Huber, Treasurer, Malta.
- The Reverend Brother James, Manager, St. Xaviers Branch School, Pulau Tikus, and Visitor, St Xaviers Institution, Penang, Straits Settlements, in recognition of his services to Education.
- Major John Walter McLean, Brigade Major of Railways and Harbours Brigade, Union of South Africa.
- Captain Frederick Gerald Peake, Inspector General of Gendarmerie, Trans-Jordan.
- The Reverend Thomas William Pearce,, in recognition of his services to Education in the Colony of Hong Kong.
- Ralph Henry Pinhorn, Headmaster of the Penang Free School, Straits Settlements, in recognition of his services to Education.
- Benjamin William Quartey-Papafio, MD, Member of the Legislative Council of the Gold Coast Colony and formerly Assistant Colonial Surgeon.
- Francis Ernest Reed, Secretary of the Jamaica Schools Commission, in recognition of his services to Education.
- Rose Lilian Vintcent, MBE, in recognition of her services in connection with the aftercare of blinded soldiers in the Union of South Africa.
- The Reverend Canon Herbert Thomas Candy Weatherhead, Head of the Buddo High School, Uganda, in recognition of his services to Education.

==== Member of the Order of the British Empire (MBE) ====
Military Division

Army

- No.1020669 Battery Sergeant-Major William James Asquith, Royal Field Artillery.
- Lieutenant Frederick Charles Avis, DCM, Royal Army Service Corps.
- Lieutenant (DO) William James Ball, Royal Artillery.
- Assistant Commissary of Ordnance and Captain Frederick Barley, Royal Army Ordnance Corps.
- Lieutenant Frederick Church, Extra Regimentally Employed List (Employed Indian Signal Service).
- Lieutenant Percy Howard Cocks, Army Educational Corps.
- Captain John Kynock Gumming, The Cameron Highlanders, Adjutant, 10th Battalion (Territorial), The King's Regiment.
- Temporary Lieutenant James Cochrane Houston, Royal Engineers.
- Temporary Captain Hubert Eyton Husey, General List.
- Lieutenant Frederick Harry Jones, Army Educational Corps.
- Captain Thomas Otto Jones, 5th Battalion (Territorial), The Welch Regiment.
- Quartermaster & Lieutenant John William Jordan, DCM, Extra Regimentally Employed List.
- Lieutenant (temporary Captain) Percy Edwin Keller, Royal Army Service Corps.
- 2nd Lieutenant Edward Mauleverer Lindesay, Royal Garrison Artillery.
- Captain William Frederick Lindsell, 4/5th Battalion (Territorial), The Cheshire Regiment.
- Quartermaster & Captain Andrew Lockie, 8th Battalion (Territorial), The Argyll and Sutherland Highlanders.
- Captain Thomas Picton, MC, The Royal Sussex Regiment, Adjutant, 7th Battalion (Territorial), The Royal Welch Fusiliers.
- Quartermaster & Captain Frank Pigden, 5/7th Battalion (Territorial), The Hampshire Regiment.
- Captain Robert Alexander Reddie, MC, 3rd Battalion (Militia), The Norfolk Regiment (Lieutenant, retired pay).
- No.5038839 Company-Sergeant-Major John Alfred Russell, The North Staffordshire Regiment.
- No.7574282 Sub-Conductor Joseph Bland Sedgwick, Royal Army Ordnance Corps.
- Quartermaster & Lieutenant James Sutherland, 2nd Battalion, The Gordon Highlanders.
- Lieutenant Edward Noel Callis Symonds, MC, Royal Garrison Artillery.
- Captain Philip Henry Tanner, MC, 17th London Regiment, Territorial Army.
- Captain Ralph Ernest Vyvyan, MC, Royal Corps of Signals.
- Captain Philip Geoffrey Whitefoord, MC, Royal Artillery.
- Lieutenant Hugh Wilkin, MC, The Queen's Own Royal West Kent Regiment.
- Assistant Commissary & Lieutenant Evan Victor Creak, Indian Miscellaneous List.
- Assistant Commissary & Lieutenant John William Danskin, Indian Miscellaneous List.
- Commissary & Major David Drysdale, Indian Miscellaneous List.
- Deputy Commissary & Captain James Fox, Indian Miscellaneous List.
- Captain Alexander Thomas Gammon, The Rangoon Battalion, Auxiliary Force, India.
- Assistant Commissary & Lieutenant Henry Berton Grimley, Supply and Transport Corps, Indian Army.
- Captain Antonelli Francisco Bartholomeu Saldanha, Indian Medical Service.
- Commissary & Major John Christopher Swinnerton, Indian Miscellaneous List.
- Commissary & Major George William Twiddy, Indian Miscellaneous List.
- Captain Alexander Vass Anderson, Royal Engineers, attached 2nd Queen Victoria's Own Sappers and Miners, Indian Army.

Royal Air Force

- Flying Officer Rowland John Divers.
- Flying Officer Leslie Hamilton, DFC.
- Observer Officer Louis James Chandler.
- No.531 Sergeant-Major, 1st Class, Clarence Herbert Baker.

Civil Division

- William Allen, Higher Executive Officer, Ministry of Labour, Northern Ireland.
- William Atteridge, District Inspector, Royal Ulster Constabulary.
- Captain Harry John Aukett, Adjutant in County Tyrone, Royal Ulster Constabulary.
- William John Cairns, Assistant Principal, Ministry of Education, Northern Ireland.
- Henry Jackson Clark, District Commandant, Special Constabulary, Northern Ireland.
- Captain Hope Crisp, Regional Awards Officer, Ministry of Pensions.
- Samuel George Fenton, District Commandant, Special Constabulary, Northern Ireland.
- Rowland Herbert Fisher, Acting Principal, Disposals Board.
- Thomas Henry Fletcher, District Inspector, Royal Ulster Constabulary.
- Captain Horace Ash Gaussen, Adjutant in Belfast, Royal Ulster Constabulary.
- Ewing Gilfillan, District Inspector, Royal Ulster Constabulary.
- Donal Charles Blake Jennings, District Inspector, Royal Ulster Constabulary.
- Douglas Egerton Keatinge. In charge of Lahore Depot, Disposals Board.
- Edward David Kerr, District Commandant, Royal Ulster Constabulary.
- Charles Magill Kirkpatrick, Assistant Principal, Ministry of Commerce, Northern Ireland.
- Sydney Richard Lamb, Secretary, Sheffield Joint Hospitals Council.
- James McBrien, Superintendent, Metropolitan Police.
- John McCarthy, Late Superintendent, Metropolitan Police.
- Louis James Mason, Higher Executive Officer, Ministry of Finance, Northern Ireland.
- John William Nixon, District Inspector, Royal Ulster Constabulary.
- Guy Carleton Richardson, Adjutant in County Fermanagh, Royal Ulster Constabulary.
- Richard Gray Ronaldson, Higher Executive Officer, Ministry of Home Affairs, Northern Ireland.
- James Ross, Paymaster to County Down Special Constabulary.
- Captain Raymond Sheppard, First Class Clerk, Imperial War Graves Commission.
- Kathleen Maria Margaret Sissmore, Administrative Assistant, General Staff, War Office. Cover description: actually in MI5.
- Reginald Rowland Spears, District Inspector, Royal Ulster Constabulary.
- Henry Taylor, District Commandant, Special Constabulary, Northern Ireland.
- George Charles Gillespie Young, District Commandant, Special Constabulary, Northern Ireland.
- Mary Frances Casson, Foreign Office.
- Charles John Gibbons, Foreign Office Press.
- Eleanor Harriet Fulcher, Foreign Office.
- Mabel Palling, Foreign Office.
- Emily Townsend, Foreign Office.
- Clarence Rose Macaulay Schmidt, Director of Office Systems, Madras.
- Harold Mackenzie Browne, Inspector of the Bombay City and Harbour Veterinary Department, Bombay.
- Khan Bahadur Syed Allah Band, Indian Attaché, Meshed.
- Sardar Bahadur Diwan Singh Duggal, Civil Surgeon, Punjab.
- Rao Sahib Raghunath Balkrishna Rajadhyaksha, Head Clerk to the Inspector General of Police, Bombay.
- Rai Sahib Nelson Charles Bose, Confidential Assistant to His Excellency the Governor of Bengal.
- Agnes Henderson, Lady Doctor, Central Provinces.
- Elsie Evelyn Crocker, of the City of Johannesburg, in recognition of her public services.
- Charles Henry Dowsett, of the City of Durban, in recognition of his public services.
- Dikran Ekmekjian, Secretary to the Ministry of Justice, Iraq.
- Alexander James Gill, of Oudtshoorn, Union of South Africa, in recognition of his public services.
- Claude Reuben Grice, Personal Assistant to the Director of Health Services, Iraq.
- Lee Peck Hock, of Singapore, Straits Settlements, in recognition of his public services.
- Rashid Khamis, in recognition of his services to the Uganda Protectorate.
- Oliver Lea, of the City of Durban, in recognition of his public services.
- Phyllis Bruce Lys, of the City of Johannesburg, in recognition of ex-public services.
- Alice Mary McClure, Acting Matron of the Mosul Civil Hospital, Iraq.
- Engela Elizabeth Mackenzie, of the City of Johannesburg, in recognition of her public services.
- George Douglas Mackie, Treasurer and Collector of Customs of the Island of Saint Lucia.
- Robert Albert James Mathieson, Press Superintendent, Ministry of Interior, Iraq.
- Ada Pitts, in recognition of her services to Education in the Colony of Hong Kong.
- Nevins Selvadurai, Principal of the Hindu College, Jaffna, Ceylon, in recognition of his services to Education.
- William Henry James Turner, Sub-Engineer, Ministry of Communications and Works, Iraq.
- Robert Ward, Superintendent of the Botanic Gardens, British Guiana.
- Sinnatamby Welayden, Chief Inspector, Vernacular Schools, Ceylon, in recognition of his services to Education.

=== Distinguished Service Order (DSO) ===
- Captain Alan Wilson Duncan, 2nd Battalion, 8th Gurkha Rifles, Indian Army.

==== Bar to the Distinguished Service Order ====
- Captain Patrick McEnroy, DSO MC, Oxfordshire and Buckinghamshire Light Infantry (formerly Leinster Regiment) (DSO gazetted 1 January 1919). For distinguished service rendered in connection with military operations in Malabar, 1921–1922.

=== Distinguished Conduct Medal (DCM) ===
- 7177145 Private J. Cahill, MM, 2nd Battalion, Manchester Regiment (formerly 1st Battalion, Leinster Regiment). (Kilnaganny)
- 7178031 Private G. Ryan, 1st Battalion, Leinster Regiment [E]. (Clonmel)

=== Companion of the Imperial Service Order (ISO) ===
Home Civil Service

- Frederick Charles Bagley, Chief Clerk and Finance Office, Ordnance Survey Department, Southampton.
- Henry William Batten, Accountant (Second Class), Disposal and Liquidation Commission.
- Tom Berry Burgess, Accountant (First Class), Army Audit Staff, War Office.
- Thomas John Cheater, BSc, Superintending Chemist, Custom House Laboratory.
- Harry Adolphus Clark, Assistant Secretary and Chief Clerk, Public Works Loan Board.
- George Davis, Superintending Clerk, Department of the Accountant-General, Admiralty.
- John Gritton, MBE, Staff Officer, Foreign Office.
- John Robert James Johnston, Chief Bankruptcy Clerk, Board of Trade.
- Frederic Henry Lewis, Accountant, Official Trustees Department, Charity Commission.
- John Mackintosh, Surveyor, Prison Commission for Scotland.
- Frederick John Pearson, Senior Assistant Accountant-General, Post Office.
- David Joseph Scourfield, Chief Clerk, Royal Mint.
- William Francis Stone, Accountant, Finance Branch, Ministry of Labour.
- Nathan Thompson, MBE, Inspector General of Waterguard, Board of Customs and Excise.
- Albert Samuel Twort, Principal Inspector of Taxes, Inland Revenue Department.

Overseas Dominions

- Walter David Bingle, Secretary to the Department of Works and Railways, Commonwealth of Australia.
- Lancelot Frederick Campbell, Supervisor of Customs, Bonthe, Sierra Leone.
- Robert James Clinckett, MBE, Official Assignee, Barbados.
- Maurice Gallagher, DSO, District Superintendent, Uganda Railway, Kenya.
- Walter Garden Hutchinson, Treasurer of the Island of Saint Vincent, Acting Administrator.
- Gilbert Owen-Smith, Commissioner of Customs and Excise, Union of South Africa.
- Oguntola Sapara, Medical Officer, Nigeria.
- John Douglas Story, Public Service Commissioner of the State of Queensland.

Indian Civil Services

- William Hayward, MBE, Assistant Secretary to the Political Resident, Persian Gulf, Bushire.
- Lieutenant Charles Archibold Webb, Superintendent, Office of Commissioner, Rawalpindi Division, Punjab
- Rao Bahadur Wasudeo Ramchandra Dhoble, Central Provinces Civil Service (Judicial).
- Khan Bahadur Abdul Hamid Khan, Extra Assistant Commissioner (retired), North West Frontier Province.
- Albert Benjamin George Snesdell, Assistant to the Deputy Inspector-General of Police, Railways and CID, Madras.
- Shearman Edward Bird, Personal Assistant to the Chief Inspector of Explosives with the Government of India.
- Shaikh Faqir-Ulla, Honorary Deputy Superintendent of Police, Punjab.
- John de Mello, Superintendent, Office of the Surgeon-General with the Government of Bombay.
- Jivanji Hormasji, Training Master and Official Referee, High Court, Rangoon, Burma.

=== Imperial Service Medal ===
Indian Civil Services

- Kattamanchi Krishnaswami, retired Duffadar, District and Sessions Court, Chittoor, Madras.
- Ashgar Khan, Jamadar to the Inspector General of Forests, India.
- Muhammad Ghouse Sahib, attender to the Chief Justice of the High Court of Judicature, Madras.

=== British Empire Medal (BEM) ===
Military Division

For Gallantry

For services rendered in connection with military operations in Malabar, 1921-1922.

- No.5718784 Private Frederick Chant, 2nd Battalion, The Dorsetshire Regiment.
- No.5718234 Sergeant William George Hand, MM, 2nd Battalion, The Dorsetshire Regiment.
- No.5718907 Private Thomas Miller, 2nd Battalion, The Dorsetshire Regiment.
- No.5719290 Private Frederick Henry Troake, 2nd Battalion, The Dorsetshire Regiment.
- Assistant Surgeon, 3rd Class, George David Rodriques, Indian Medical Department.

For Meritorious Service.

- No.7177147 Company-Quartermaster-Sergeant John Christie, 1st Battalion, The Lancashire Fusiliers (formerly 1st Battalion, The Leinster Regiment).
- Staff Sergeant H.A. Joy, Indian Ordnance Department.

Civil Division

- Alexander Brown, Chancery Servant at HM Legation and Consulate-General, Panama.
- Henry William Fontaine, Head Office Keeper at the India Office.
- Subadar Major Gurmukh Singh, Straits Settlements Police, 1885–1923.
- Ato Retta Wassi, Head Syce of HM Legation, Addis Ababa.
- Said Shahwan, Chief Kavas to the High Commissioner for Palestine.
- Hsia Yung-chi, Coxwain of the Government Steam Launch Alexandra at Weihaiwei.

=== Military Cross (MC) ===
- Lieutenant William Benjamin Whitaker, 2nd Battalion, 70th Burma Rifles, Indian Army.

=== Military Medal (MM) ===
2nd Battalion, The Dorsetshire Regiment
For bravery in connection with military operations in Malabar, 1921-1922.

- 5719280 Private G. Alexander. (Jersey)
- 5718697 Private L. Churchill. (Poole)
- 5719133 Corporal R. Collins. (Brixton)
- 5718387 Sergeant H. Fairman. (Semley)
- 5719354 Private C. Trueman. (Shanklin)

=== Air Force Cross (AFC) ===
- Squadron Leader John Kilner Wells.
- Squadron Leader Harold James Payn.

=== Air Force Medal (AFM) ===
- 248043 Corporal Herbert Valentine Hughes.

=== Kaisar-i Hind Medal ===
- Begum Saheba Fatima Sidhika, Regent of Manawadar, Bombay.
- The Reverend Canon Arthur Crosthwaite, S.P.G. Moradabad, United Provinces.
- The Reverend Father Theophilus Van Der Schueren, Priest, Society of Jesus, Bengal.
- The Reverend Father Ernest Francois Auguste Loubière, of Paris Society of Foreign Missions, Cuddalore, South Arcot District, Madras.
- Ann Elizabeth Banks, late Lady Principal of the Bevenshaw Girls High School, Cuttack, Bihar and Orissa Province.
- Eleanor McDougall, Principal of the Women's Christian College, Madras.
- Bai Bahadur Lala Tara Chand, Honorary Magistrate, Bhiwani, Hissar District, Punjab.
- Williamena Johan Meiklejohn, Nursing Superintendent, General Hospital, Rangoon, Burma.
- Bhola Nath Barooah, Merchant, Assam.

==== Bar to the Kaisar-i-Hind Medal ====
First Class

- Lilian Agnes Starr, Matron-in-charge of the CMS Mission Hospital, Peshawar, North West Frontier Province.

=== Mention in Despatches ===
For distinguished services rendered in connection with military operations in Malabar, 1921-1922.

- Captain A. W. Duncan, 2nd Battalion, 8th Gurkha Rifles, Indian Army.
- Colonel E. T. Humphreys, CMG DSO.
- Captain P. McEnroy, DSO MC, Oxfordshire and Buckinghamshire Light Infantry (formerly Leinster Regiment).

=== Promotions ===
To the rank of Air Marshal in the Royal Air Force

- Air Vice Marshal Sir John Maitland Salmond, KCB CMG CVO DSO, in recognition of his distinguished service in Command of the Forces in Iraq.

=== Honorary rank ===
Honorary Major

- Honourable Captain His Highness Raj Rajeshwar Maharajadhiraja Sir Umed Singh Bahadur, KCVO, Maharaja of Jodhpur.
