= Mount Underwood (New Zealand) =

Mountain in Fiordland, New Zealand

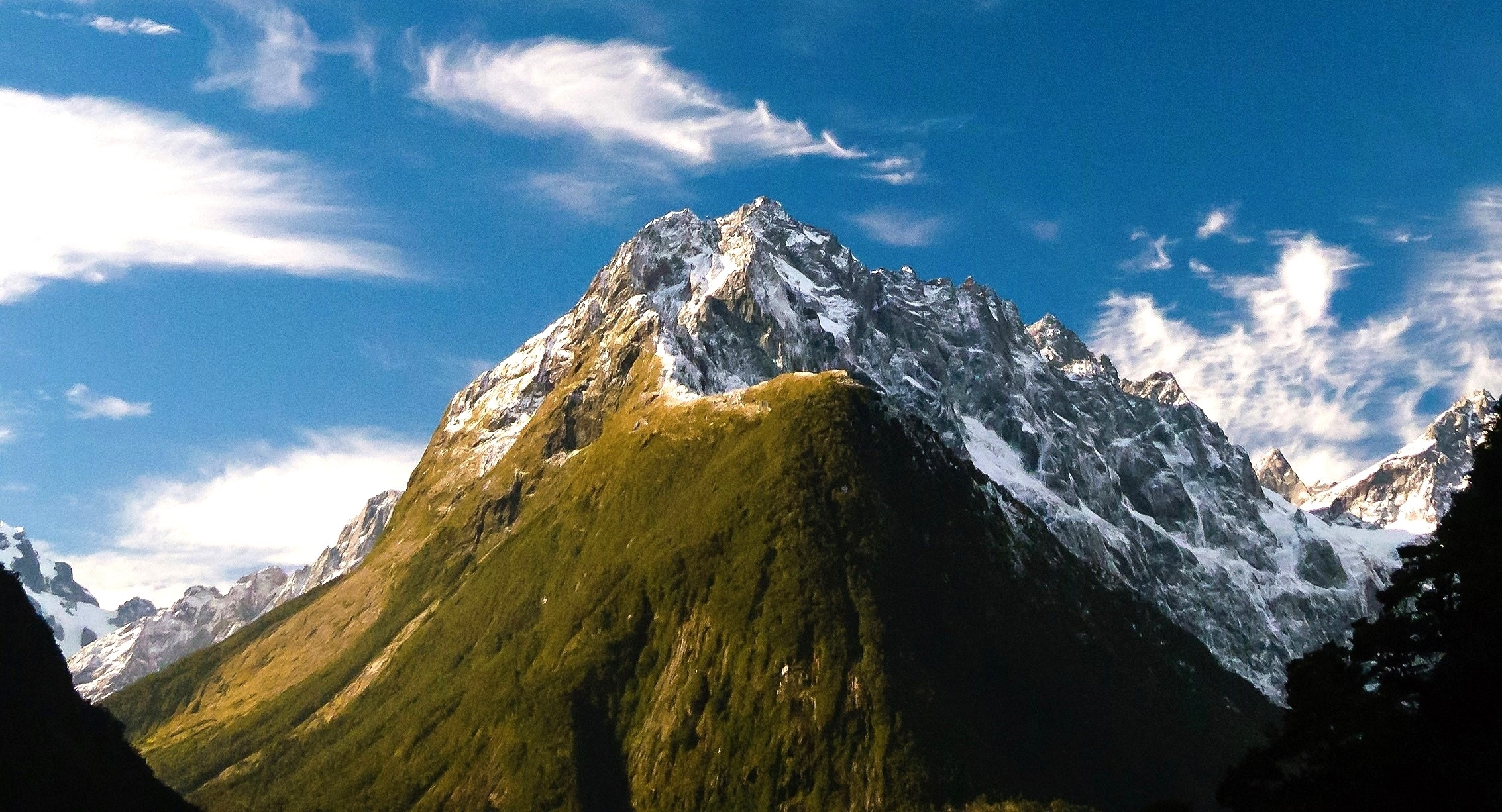
- Southwest aspect

Highest point
- Elevation: 2,222 m (7,290 ft)
- Prominence: 257 m (843 ft)
- Isolation: 1.63 km (1.01 mi)
- Coordinates: 44°40′24″S 168°00′14″E

Naming
- Etymology: Thomas Underwood

Geography
- Location within New Zealand
- Interactive map of Mount Underwood
- Location: South Island
- Country: New Zealand
- Region: Southland
- Protected area: Fiordland National Park
- Parent range: Darran Mountains
- Topo map: NZMS260 D40

Geology
- Rock age: 136 ± 1.9 Ma
- Rock type(s): Gabbronorite, dioritic orthogneiss

Climbing
- First ascent: 1938

Mount Underwood is a 2,222-metre-elevation (7,290-foot) mountain in Fiordland, New Zealand.

== Description ==
Mount Underwood is part of the Darran Mountains and it is situated six kilometres east of Milford Sound in the Southland Region of the South Island. It is set within Fiordland National Park which is part of the Te Wahipounamu UNESCO World Heritage Site. Precipitation runoff from the mountain's slopes drains south into the Donne River and west into the Tūtoko River. Topographic relief is significant as the summit rises 2,120 metres (6,955 feet) above the Tūtoko Valley in two kilometres. The nearest higher neighbour is Mount Patuki, 1.63 kilometre to the north. The mountain's toponym honours Thomas Underwood, captain of the ship Rotomahana, which operated cruises in Fiordland.

== Climbing ==
The first ascent of the summit was made in 1938 by David Lewis and Lindsay Stewart.

Climbing routes with the first ascents:

- North East Ridge – David Lewis, Lindsay Stewart – (1938)
- South Ridge – Harold Jacobs, Paul Coradine – (1971)
- Donne (South) Face – Colin Strang, Allan Soon, Mark Easton, David Ellis – (1974)
- East Face Buttress – Galen Rowell, Miles Craighead, Graeme Elder, John Stanton – (1977)
- Taoka Icefall – FA unknown

== Climate ==
Based on the Köppen climate classification, Mount Underwood is located in a marine west coast climate zone. Prevailing westerly winds blow moist air from the Tasman Sea onto the mountains, where the air is forced upward by the mountains (orographic lift), causing moisture to drop in the form of rain or snow. The months of December through February offer the most favourable weather for viewing or climbing this peak.

== Gallery ==
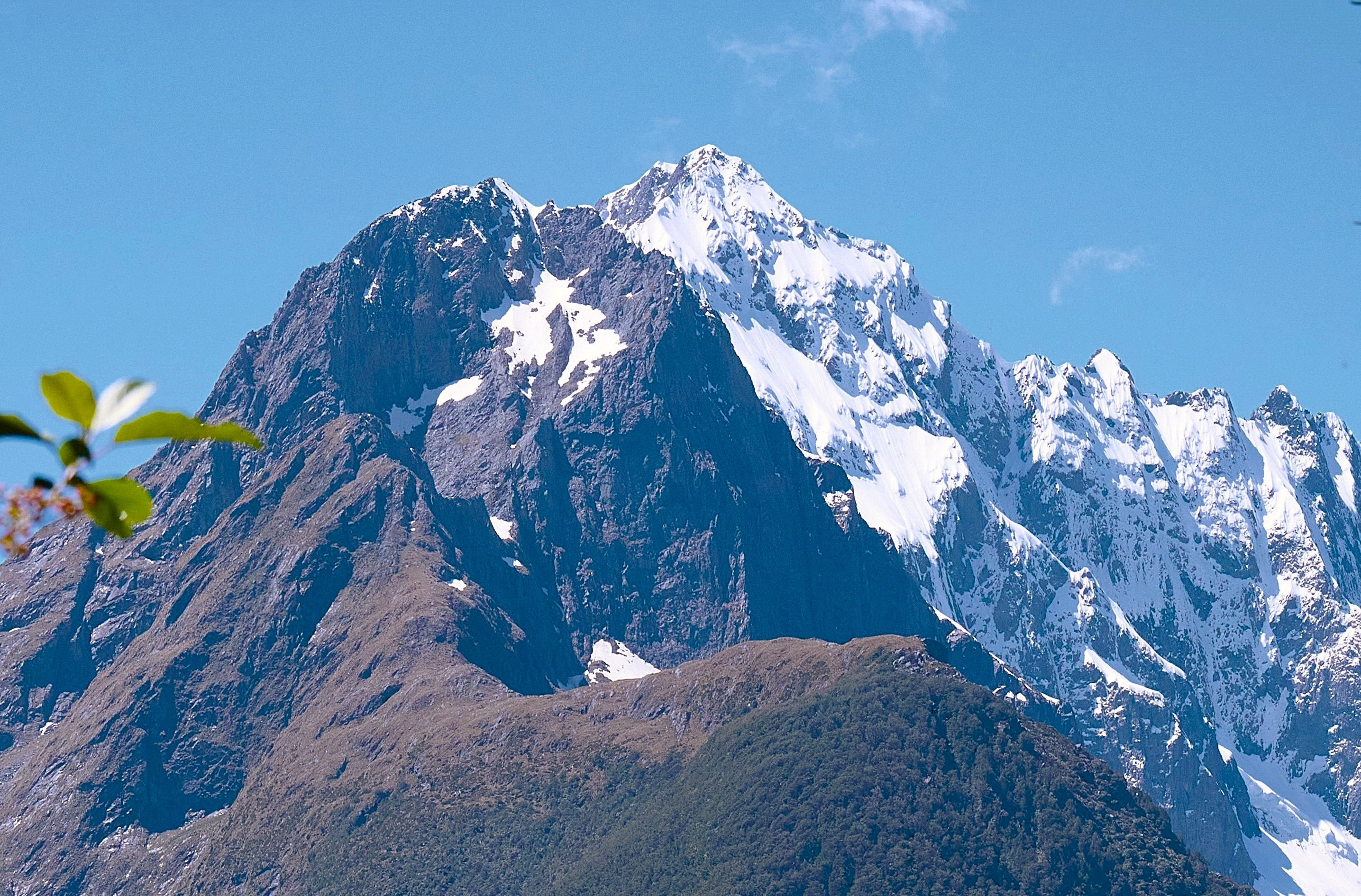
Southwest aspect of Mount Underwood

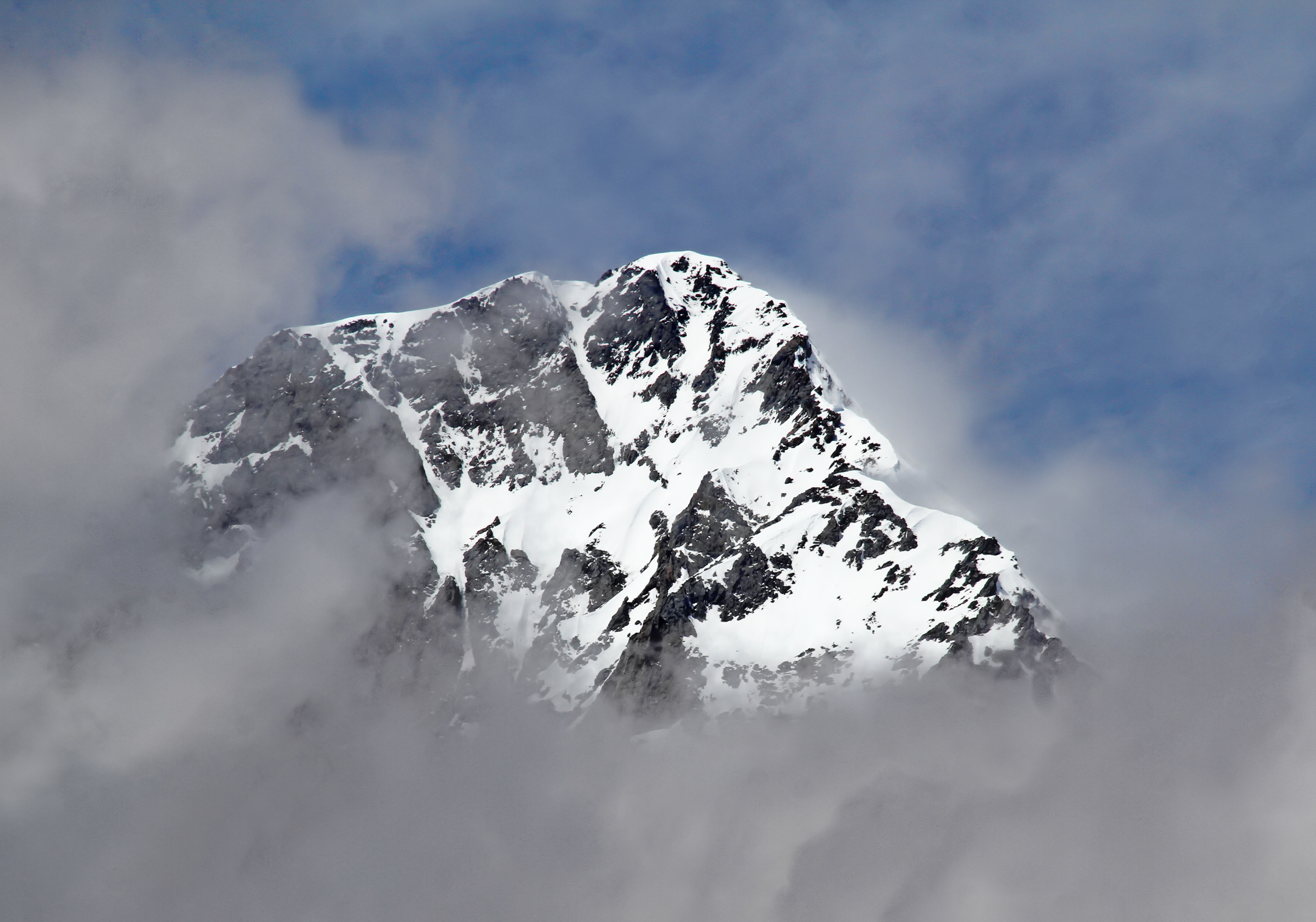
West aspect of summit of Mount Underwood

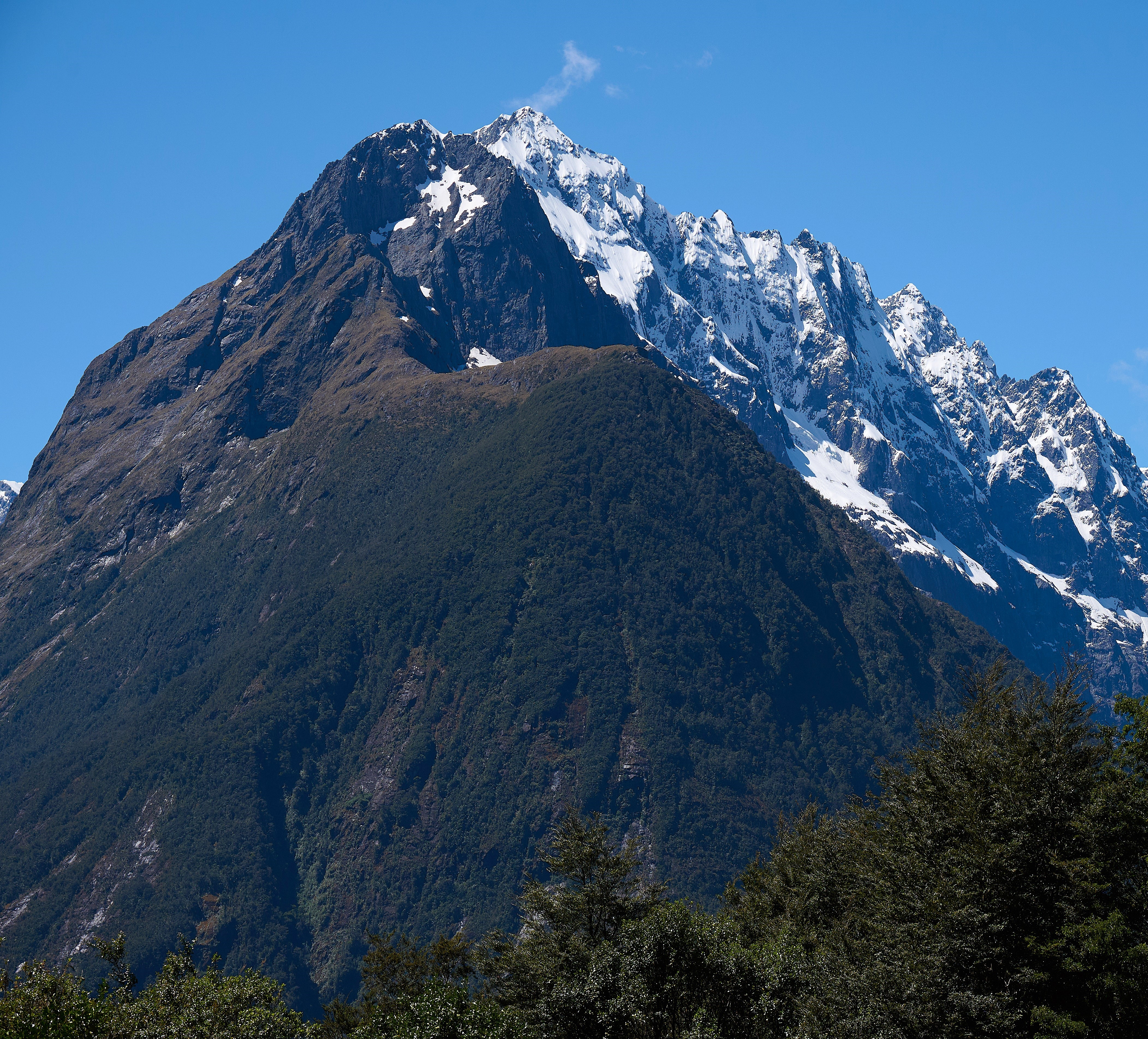
Southwest aspect of Mount Underwood

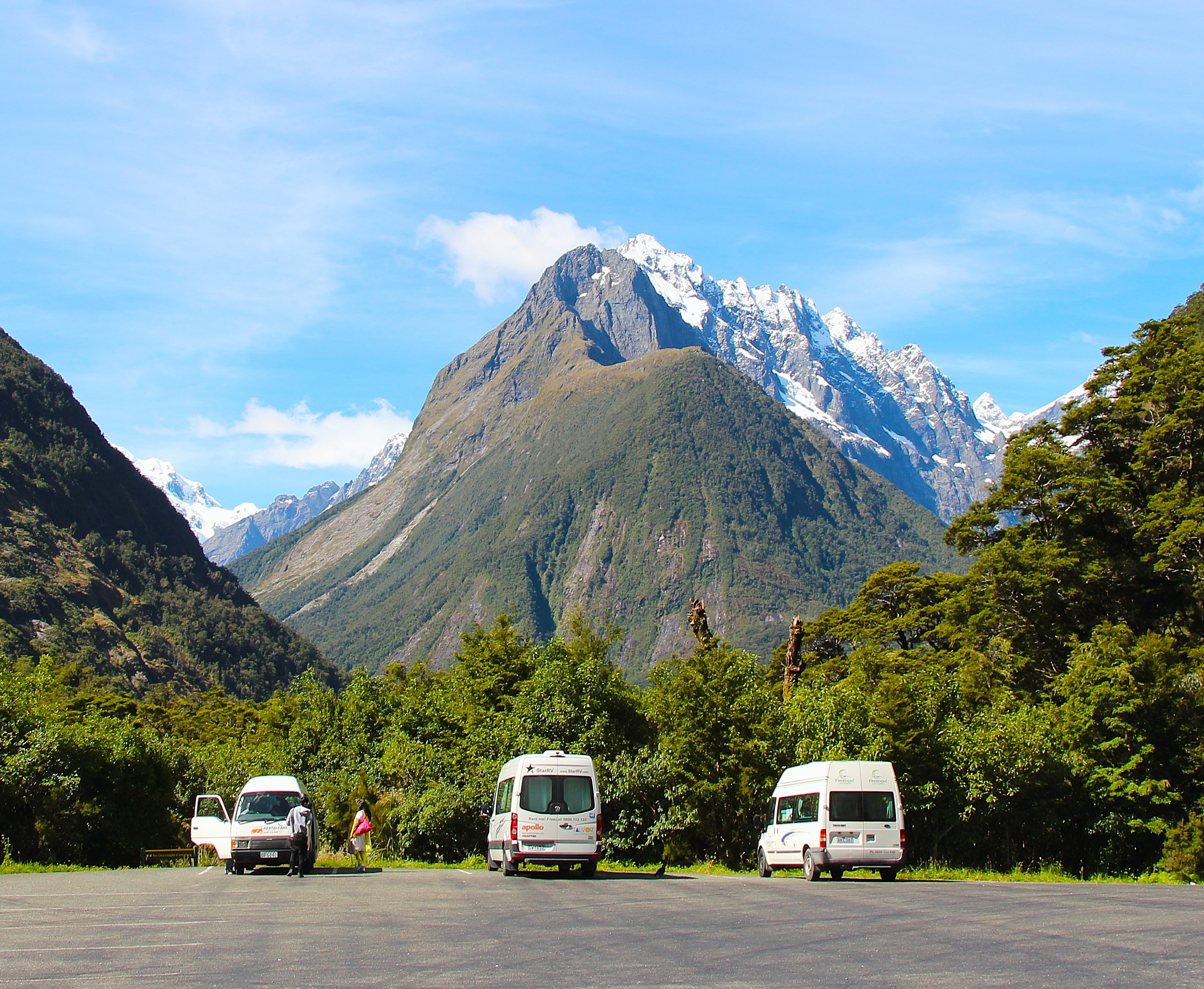
Southwest aspect of Mount Underwood viewed from parking area for The Chasm

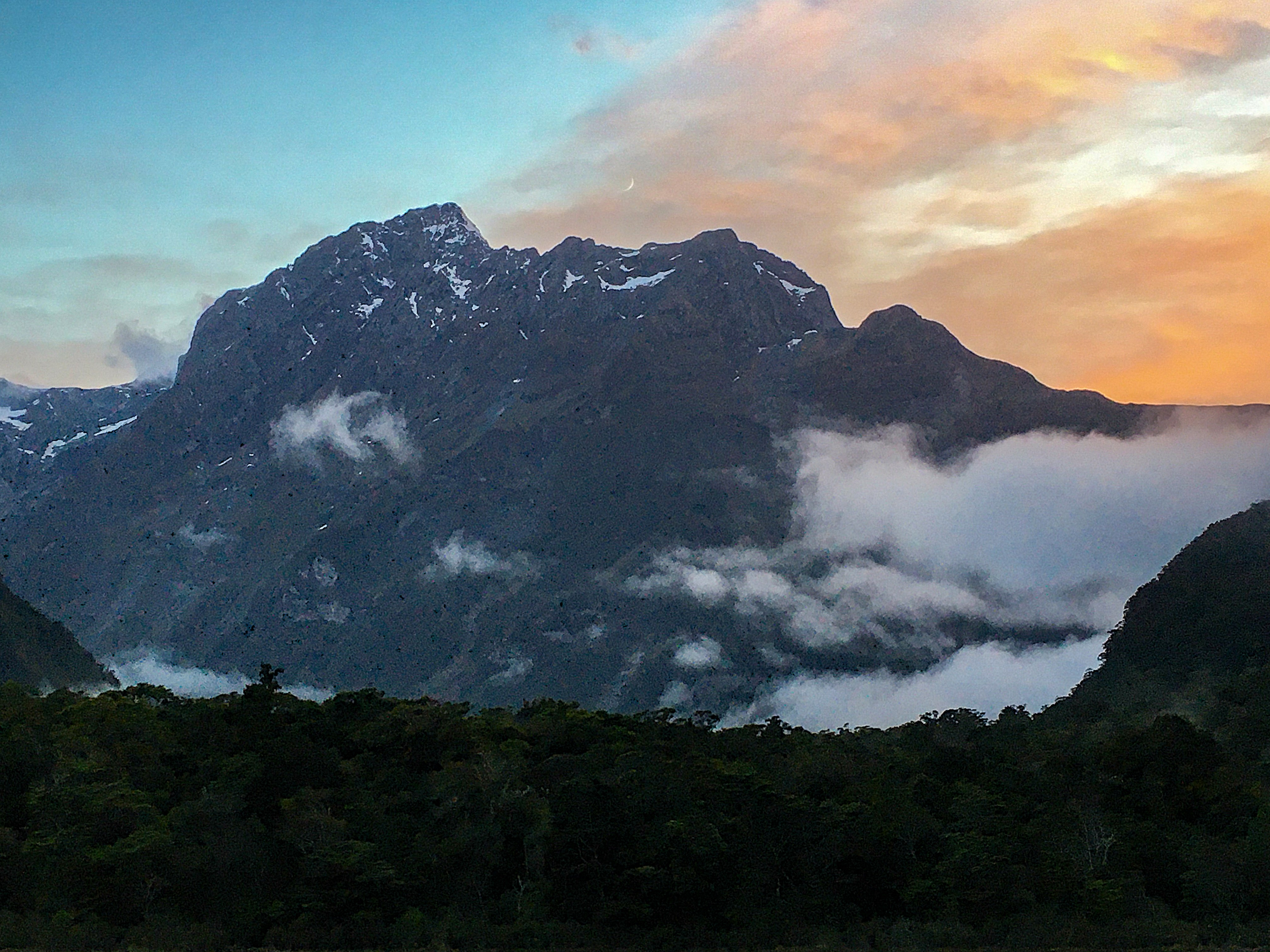
West aspect

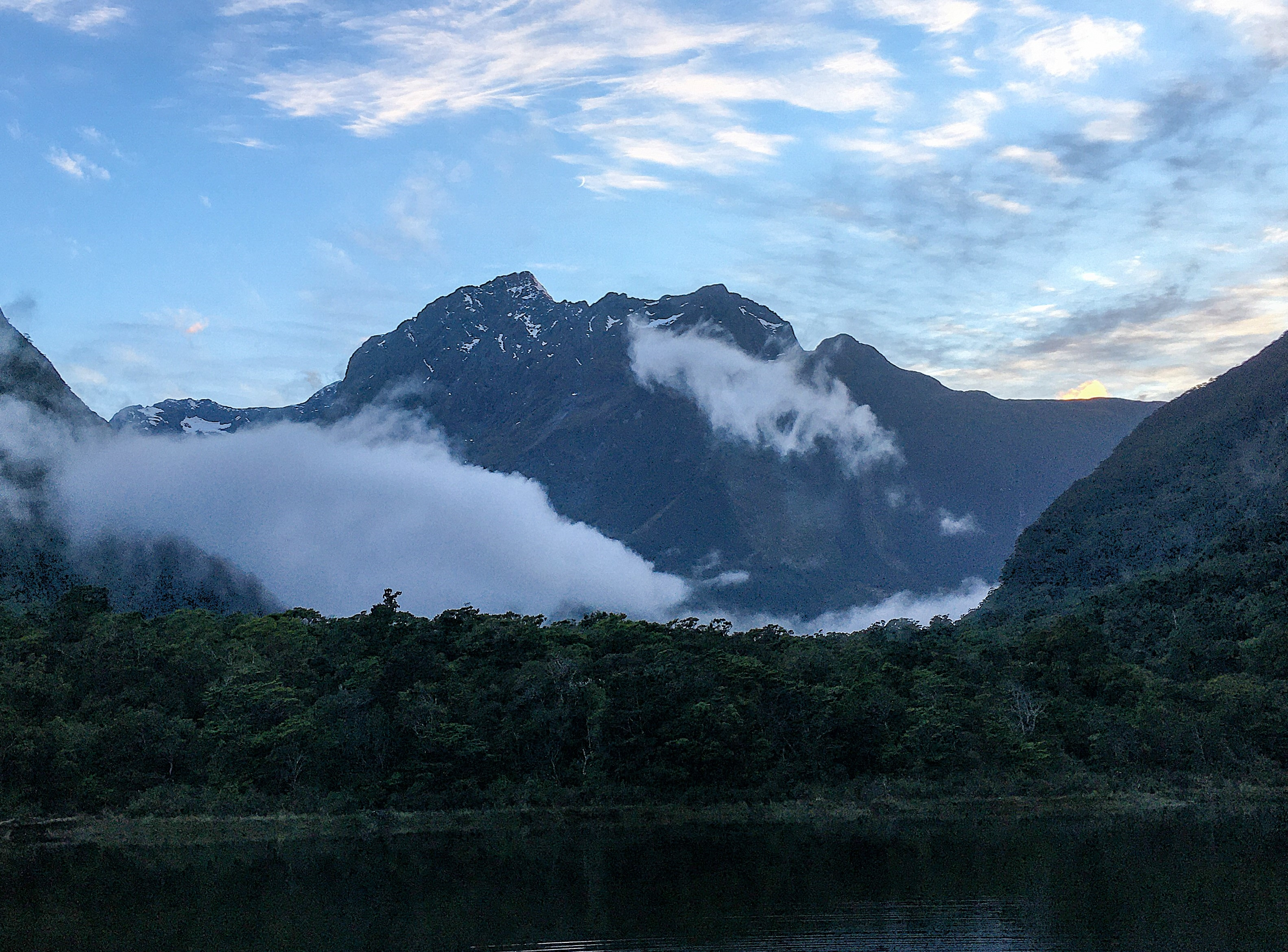
West aspect from Milford Sound

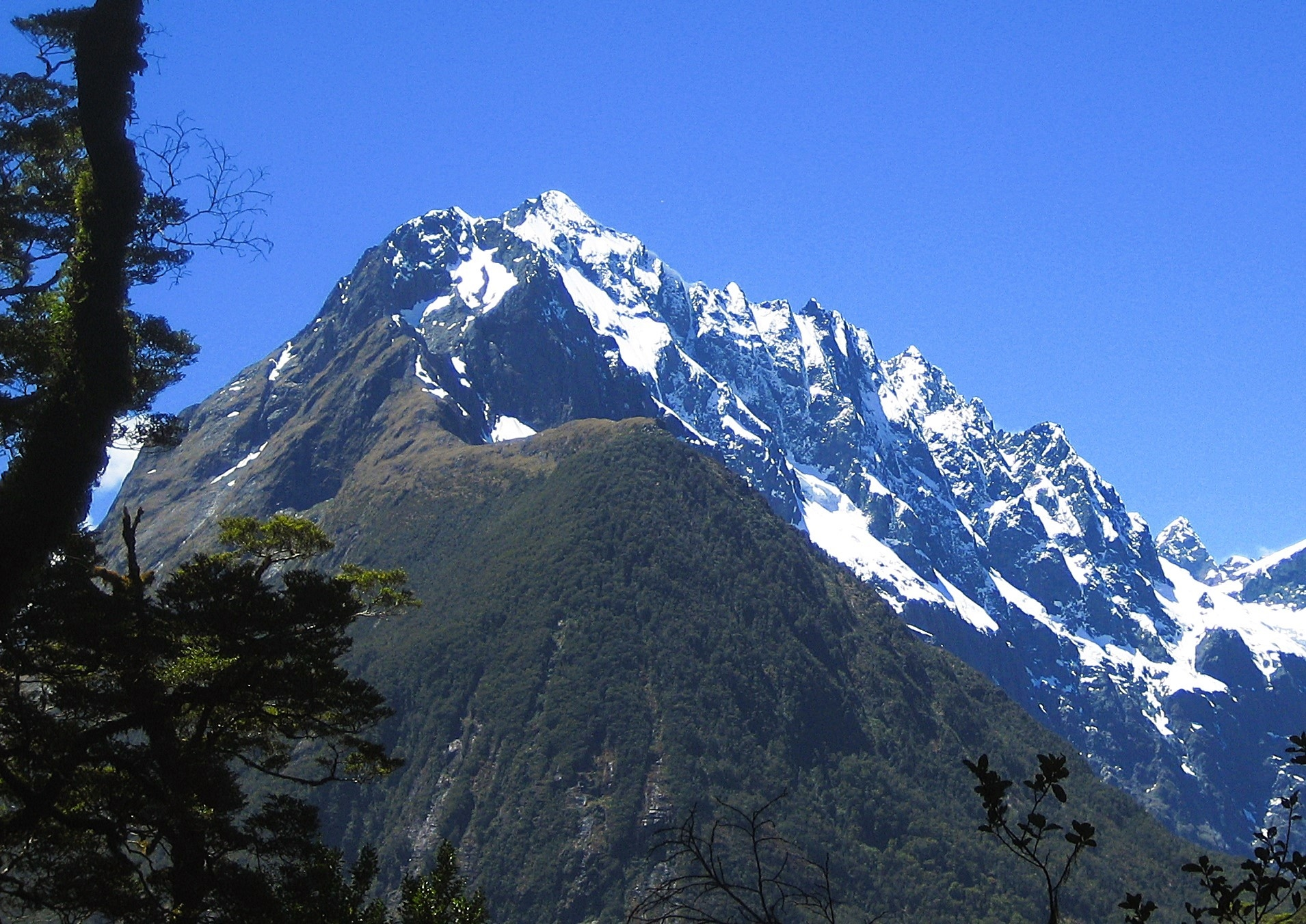
Southwest aspect

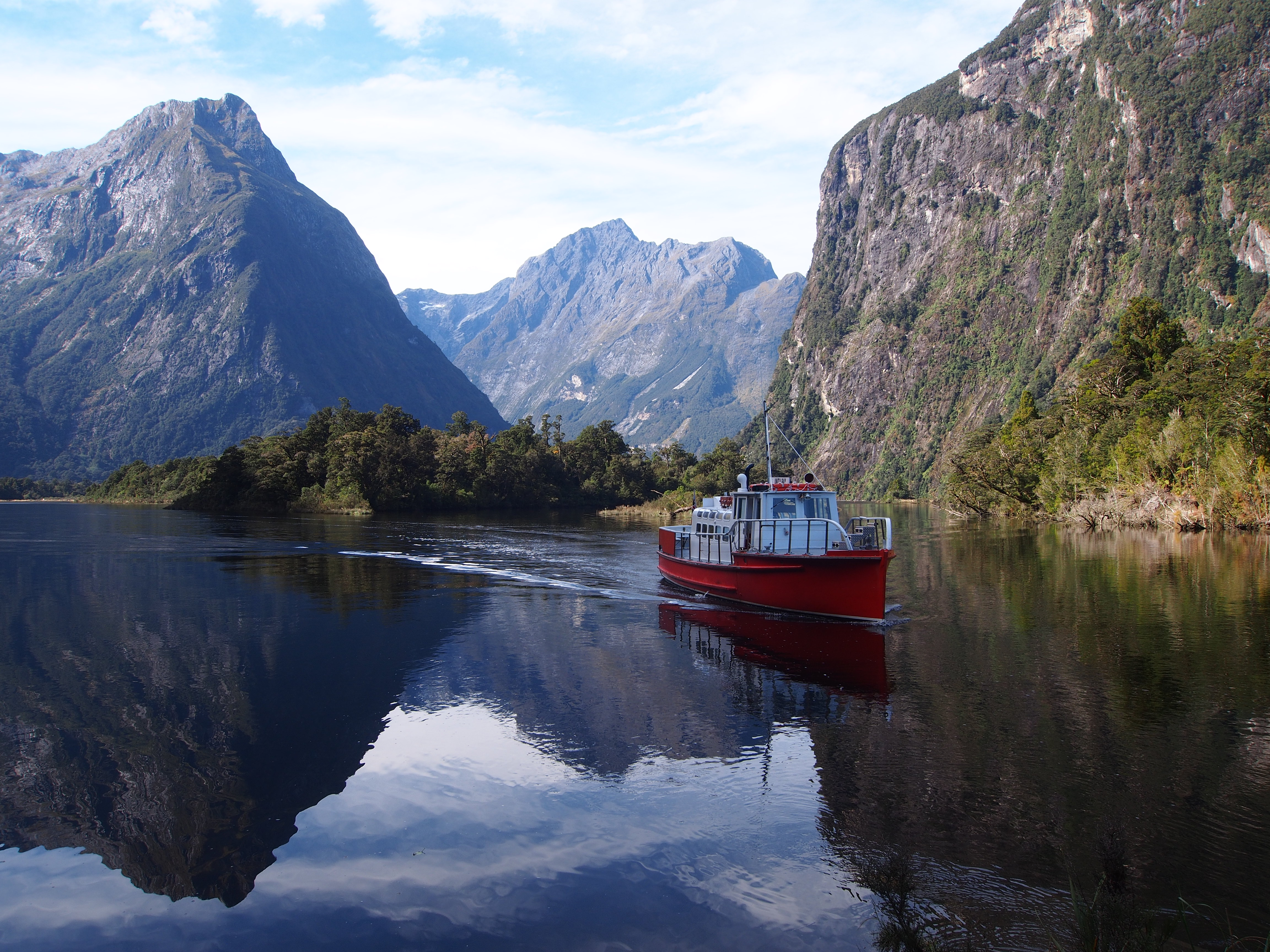
Mount Underwood centred. Barren Peak to left.

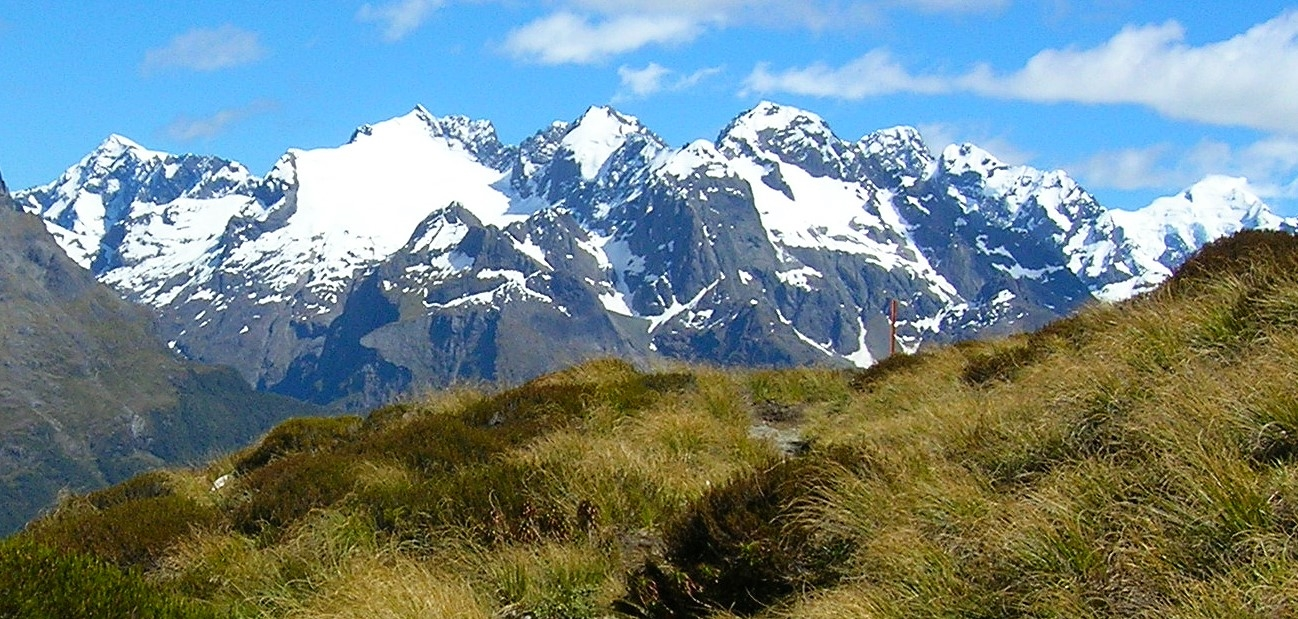
East aspect of Mount Underwood furthest to left.
View from Routeburn Track.

== See also ==
- List of mountains of New Zealand by height
- Fiordland
