= Cleddau =

Cleddau may refer to:

- Cleddau River, a river in South Island, New Zealand
- River Cleddau, a river in Pembrokeshire, Wales
  - Milford Haven Waterway, the Cleddau Estuary or Daugleddau
  - Cleddau Bridge, crossing over the Cleddau Estuary
