= Henry Rothband =

British public servant

Sir Henry Lesser Rothband, 1st Baronet (died 1 November 1940), was a British public servant.

Rothband was the author of The Rothband employment scheme for sailors and soldiers disabled in the war, published in 1917. He was created a baronet, of Higher Broughton, Salford, in the County Palatine of Lancaster, in the 1923 Birthday Honours, in recognition of his "public services".

Rothband died in November 1940 when the baronetcy became extinct.

Baronetage of the United Kingdom
New creation	Baronet (of Higher Broughton); 1923–1940	Extinct
