= Samuel Watt =

British government official (1876–1927)

Samuel Watt CB CBE (6 April 1876–18 November 1927) was an Irish (later Northern Irish) civil servant.

Watt was born in Newry, County Down, and educated at Trinity College, Dublin. He served in the Public Record Office of Ireland and then the Local Government Board of Ireland, both in Dublin. He then joined the Office of the Chief Secretary for Ireland. Following a stint at the Admiralty in London he returned to the Chief Secretary's Office and became Private Secretary to Edward Shortt from 1918 to 1919 and then to his successor, Ian Macpherson, from 1919 to 1920. With the partition of Ireland in December 1921, he was appointed Permanent Secretary of the Northern Ireland Ministry of Home Affairs, retiring due to ill-health.

He was appointed Companion of the Order of the Bath (CB) in the 1920 New Year War Honours and Commander of the Order of the British Empire (CBE) in the 1923 Birthday Honours.
