= John Ernest Adamson =

English author and educator (1867–1950)

Sir John Ernest Adamson CMG
- Born: 11 January 1867; Westgate Common, Wakefield, Yorkshire, England
- Died: 25 April 1950 (aged 83); Muizenberg, near Cape Town, South Africa
- Occupations: Director of Education for Transvaal; Academic
- Years active: 1891–1950
- Spouse: Gwendolyn Mary Howell Thomas

Sir John Ernest Adamson CMG (11 January 1867 – 25 April 1950) was an English educationalist. He was director of education in Transvaal, modern day South Africa from 1905 to 1924 and played an important role in developing that territory's education system.

Adamson was born in Yorkshire. He received an ordinary schooling for the time and trained as a teacher. As a young man he worked at teacher training colleges and pursued university level education. In 1902 he moved to the newly-created Colony of Transvaal to run a teacher training college.

During Adamson's period of responsibility for education in Transvaal he was considered understanding of the section of the population which was of Dutch descent, a group which had an uneasy relationship with Britain, and worked to integrate them into the school system. He made less effort to accommodate indigenous people and his views about their education were conflicted. He established compulsory education for white children in 1916. Adamson also held various academic posts and received two honours.

== Biography ==
John Ernest Adamson was born on 11 January 1867 in Westgate Common, Wakefield, Yorkshire, England. His parents were Tom Adamson, an engine fitter, and his wife Eliza née Stokoe. He received his early education at St Michael's elementary school in his hometown. From 1889 to 1891 Adamson trained as a teacher at St Mark's College in Chelsea and was employed in the college's staff. Beginning in 1891 he taught teaching at the South Wales Training College in Carmarthen. He continued to study, gaining a Bachelor of Arts at the University of London in 1894, and Master of Arts in Philosophy in 1901. On 23 April 1897 Adamson married Gwendolyn Mary Howell Thomas from Carmarthen. They had no children.

In 1902 Adamson moved to the Colony of Transvaal. He would play a major role in developing the education system of Transvaal in the period after the Second Boer War. On the recommendation of Michael Sadlier he was appointed head of the Normal College in Pretoria which would provide teachers for the new territory. From 1905 to 1924 he served as Director of Education for Transvaal working under various governments.

Adamson was heavily involved in all aspects of education throughout his period in the position. Adamson attempted to use the education system to aid the reconstruction of a war-torn society. He was part of a wider movement which saw education as being useful for these kinds of social purposes. Adamson was considered very empathetic towards those of Dutch descent only a few years after Britain had been at war with them. The fact that he learnt Dutch and Afrikaans helped him to negotiate with his country's former enemies in a tense political situation. He dealt with issues of religion and language to create an education system which could cater for the entire white population. His obituary in The Times stated that Adamson's priority was getting children into schools and that he was willing to compromise on cultural issues to achieve that. He received some criticism at the time from those who saw him as overly sympathetic to the Dutch.

Adamson reached an agreement where the "Christian national schools", which had been created by the Dutch section of the population as an alternative to government-controlled schools, would rejoin the state system. He contributed to the Transvaal Education Act of 1907 which created a new education system intended to balance the interests of the British and Dutch sections of the population. His most significant success was the establishment of compulsory education for white children aged 7 to 15 years in 1916. His entry in the Oxford Dictionary of National Biography criticises him for neglecting the needs of the indigenous (non-white) population. He advocated a policy of "proceeding cautiously" with the education of this group, a subject that was being heavily debated at the time. Though he commented in 1920 that "neither from the missionary side nor from the side of the Government is responsibility towards native education recognised and accepted as it should be". He retired from his position in 1924 after the electoral defeat of the South African Party.

Adamson wrote various books, articles and other texts. His most important work was The Individual and the Environment: some Aspects of the Theory of Education as Adjustment (1921) for which he received a Bachelor of Letters from the University of London. According to his Oxford Dictionary of National Biography entry it is a "rather dense summary of contemporary British educational philosophy" and fairly abstract in its discussion of education with little comment on his work in Transvaal. He was a member of the council of the University of the Cape of Good Hope from 1906 to 1917 and the University of South Africa from 1918 to 1924. From 1924 to 1926 he was also vice-chancellor of the second university. He was a professor at and head of the Rhodes University College from 1924 to 1930. In 1935 he briefly took over Percy Nunn's teaching at the London Institute of Education.

Adamson chaired two government committees in the Union of South Africa towards the end of his life one on higher education and another on language usage in the education system. In his free time he enjoyed playing music and golf. He died on 25 April 1950 in Muizenberg, near Cape Town, South Africa. His obituary in The Times describes him as a thoughtful and relatively introverted person but also someone who was well-liked by those who knew him. The bulk of information available about his life is from a 1951 biography by G. P. van Rooyen which praised him for his sympathy with the Afrikaner and his role in the development of education.

== Honours ==
Adamson was appointed a Companion of the Order of St Michael and St George (CMG) in the 1923 Birthday Honours and was knighted for services to education in the 1924 Birthday Honours.
