= Holberry Mensforth =

Sir Holberry Mensforth, KCB, CBE (1 May 1871 – 5 September 1951), engineer and engineering company executive.

His second son Sir Eric Mensforth was a pioneer of the British helicopter industry.

He was appointed a Knight Commander of the Order of the Bath (KCB) in the 1923 Birthday Honours, when he was Director-General of Factories at the War Office.
