= Vyell Vyvyan =

British Royal Navy officer

Sir Arthur Vyell Vyvyan
- Born: 12 March 1875; Multan, Punjab, British India
- Died: 30 September 1935 (aged 60); Marylebone, London, England
- Military career
- Allegiance: United Kingdom
- Branch: Royal Navy (1891–1918); Royal Air Force (1918–1925)
- Service years: 1891–1925
- Rank: Air Vice Marshal
- Commands: RAF Coastal Area (1919–24); RAF Northern Area (1919); HMS Endymion
- Conflicts: First World War
- Awards: Knight Commander of the Order of the Bath; Distinguished Service Order; Order of Saint Anna (Russia); Mentioned in Despatches (2); Officer of the Legion of Honour (France); Order of the Rising Sun, 3rd Class (Japan); Distinguished Service Medal (United States); Grand Commander of the Order of the Redeemer (Greece)

Air Vice Marshal Sir Arthur Vyell Vyvyan, KCB, DSO (12 March 1875 – 30 September 1935) was an officer in the Royal Navy in the early 20th century, and later a senior officer in the newly created Royal Air Force.

== Military career ==
Vyvyan joined the Royal Navy in 1891, where he was promoted to lieutenant on 14 January 1896. In 1902 he was posted to the Sheerness Gunnery School senior staff, at HMS Wildfire.

In 1916, while holding the rank of captain, Vyvyan became involved in naval aviation, serving as the Assistant to the Superintendent of Aircraft Construction before being appointed the Assistant to the Director of the Air Service.

With the impending establishment of the Royal Air Force (RAF), Vyvyan was employed at the Air Ministry and was promoted to brigadier general in the RAF. Departing London just after the 1 April 1918 when the RAF was formally created, Vyvyan briefly returned to operational service as the senior RAF officer in the Mediterranean. In late April he was recalled to Great Britain and appointed the General Officer Commanding the RAF's Northern Area. The following year he became Air Officer Commanding Coastal Area, receiving a promotion to air vice marshal shortly after taking up post. He retired from the RAF in 1925.

A memorial to him lies within St James's Church, Piccadilly.

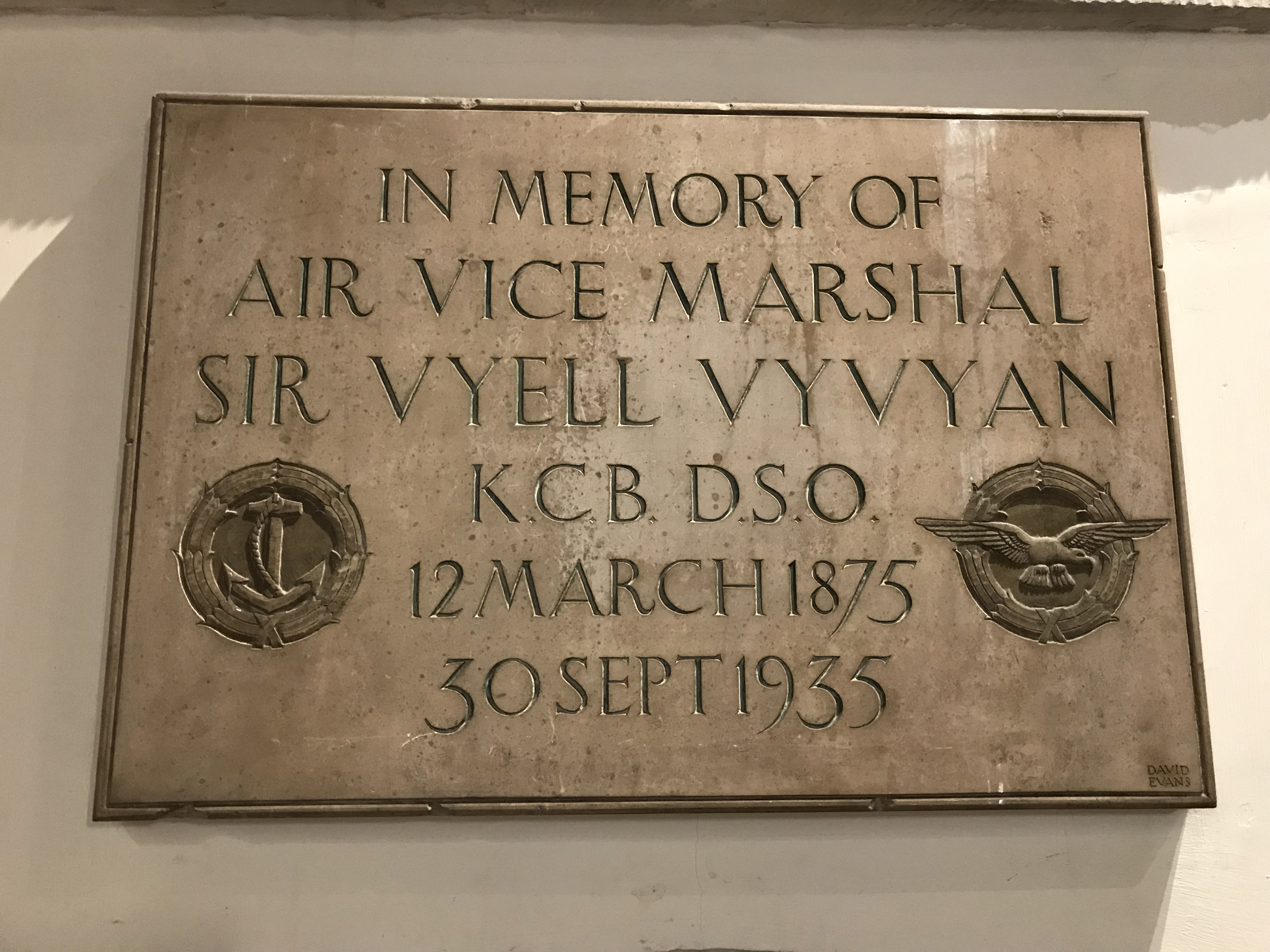
A memorial to Vyell Vyvyan in St James's Church, Piccadilly.

== Honours and awards ==
- Knight Commander of the Order of the Bath – 1923 Birthday Honours (CB – 3 Jun 1918)
- Distinguished Service Order – 14 Mar 1916
- Order of Saint Anna – Dec 1909 (Russia)
- Mentioned in Despatches – 14 Mar 1916, 3 Jun 1918
- Officer of the Legion of Honour – 11 Aug 1917 (France)
- Order of the Rising Sun, 3rd class – 8 Nov 1918 (Japan)
- Distinguished Service Medal (United States) – 16 Dec 1919
- Grand Commander of the Order of the Redeemer – 1920 (Greece)

Military offices
Preceded by George Cayley	General Officer Commanding North-Western Area; Redesignated GOC Northern Area in June 1919; Redesignated AOC Northern Area in August 1919; 1919	Succeeded by Hugh Dowding
New title Command established	Air Officer Commanding Coastal Area; 1919–1924	Succeeded by Francis Scarlett
