= David Davis (lord mayor of Birmingham) =

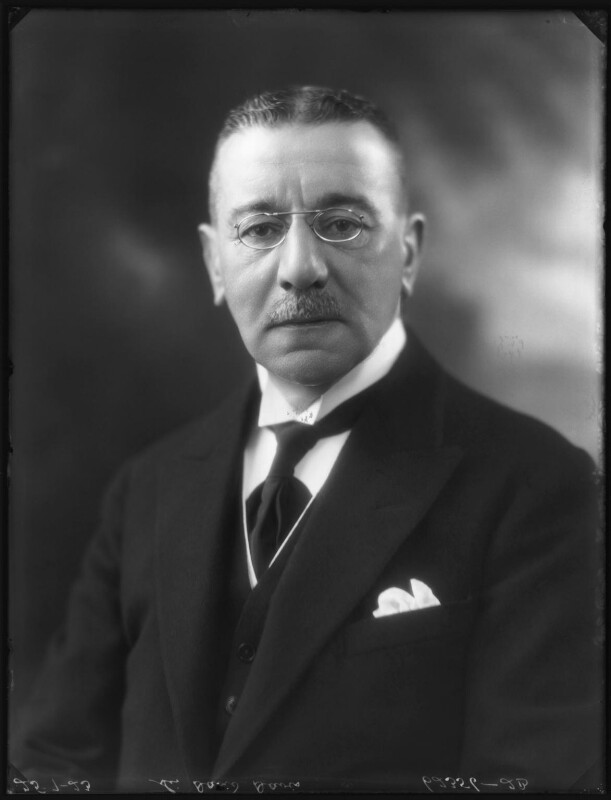
Davis in 1923

Sir David Davis (1859 – 11 June 1938) served as the first Jewish lord mayor of Birmingham, England for two terms, from 1921–1923, and served for a time as the Justice of the Peace. He was on the Birmingham City Council from 1901 to 1924.

Davis was knighted in the 1923 Birthday Honours.
