= 1923 Birthday Honours (New Zealand) =

Awards list for New Zealand

The 1923 King's Birthday Honours in New Zealand, celebrating the official birthday of King George V, were appointments made by the King on the recommendation of the New Zealand government to various orders and honours to reward and highlight good works by New Zealanders. They were announced on 2 June 1923.

The recipients of honours are displayed here as they were styled before their new honour.

== Knight Bachelor ==
- The Honourable Frederick Revans Chapman – judge of the Supreme Court.
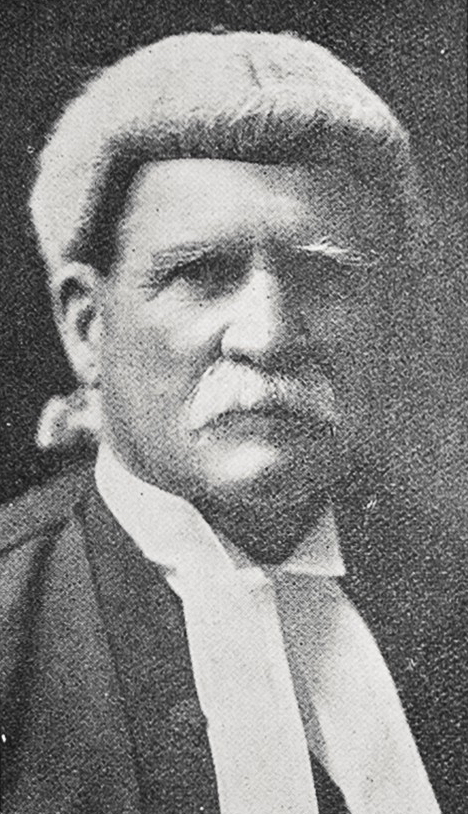
Sir Frederick Chapman

== Order of the Bath ==
=== Companion (CB) ===
Military division

- Captain (Commodore, 2nd class) Alan Geoffrey Hotham CMG – Royal Navy. In recognition of valuable services rendered in organising, recruiting, and training for the New Zealand Division of the Royal Navy, and as naval adviser to the New Zealand government.
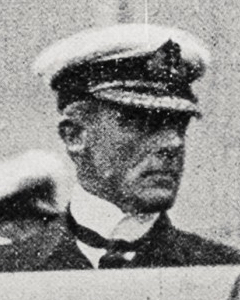
Alan Hotham

== Order of Saint Michael and Saint George ==
=== Companion (CMG) ===
- Captain Thomas Edward Donne – secretary, office of the high commissioner in London for New Zealand.
- James William Tibbs – lately headmaster of the Auckland Grammar School. In recognition of services to education.
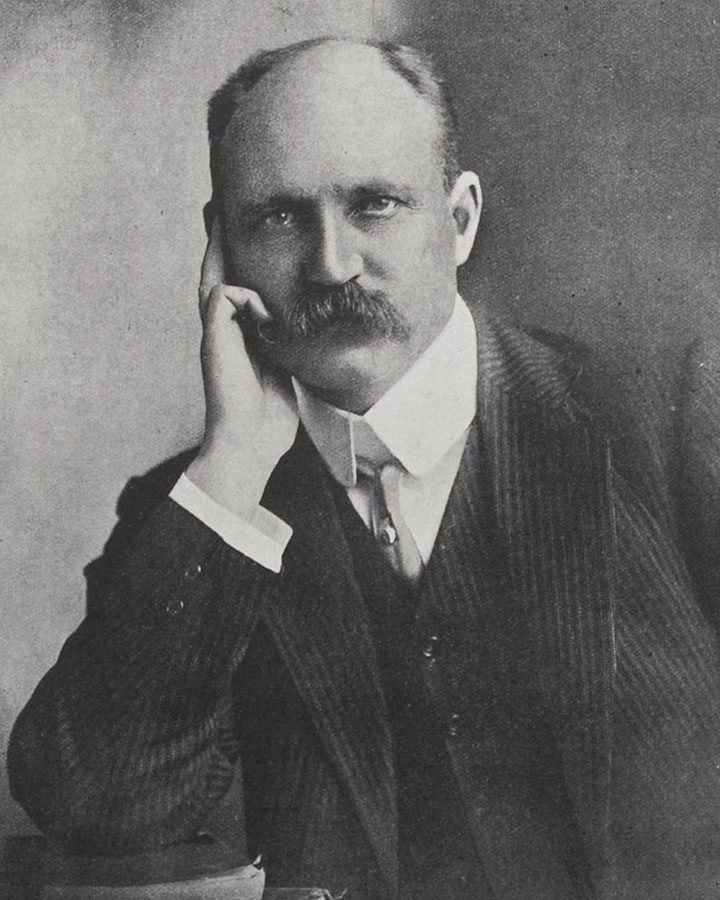
Thomas Donne

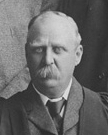
James Tibbs

== Order of the British Empire ==
=== Knight Commander (KBE) ===
Civil division

- Robert Howard Nolan CBE – of Auckland. In recognition of his public services.
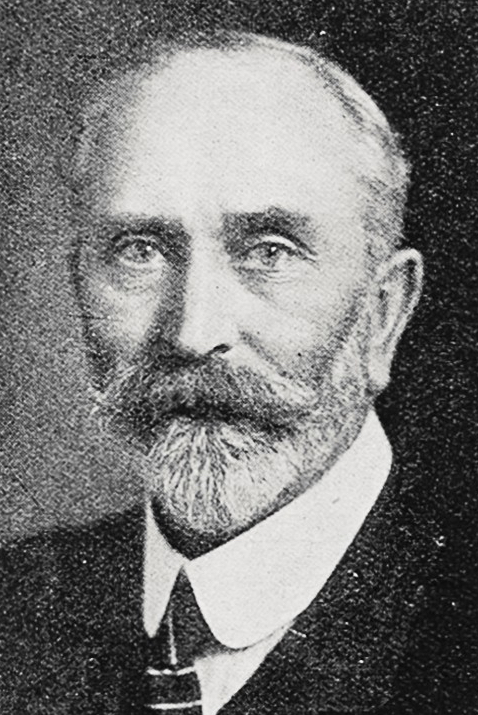
Sir Robert Nolan

=== Officer (OBE) ===
Civil division

- Frederick William Flanagan – permanent head of the Valuation Department.
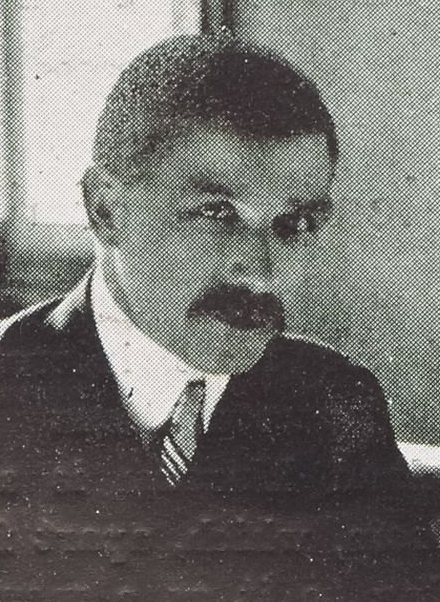
Frederick Flanagan
