= Gulliver River =

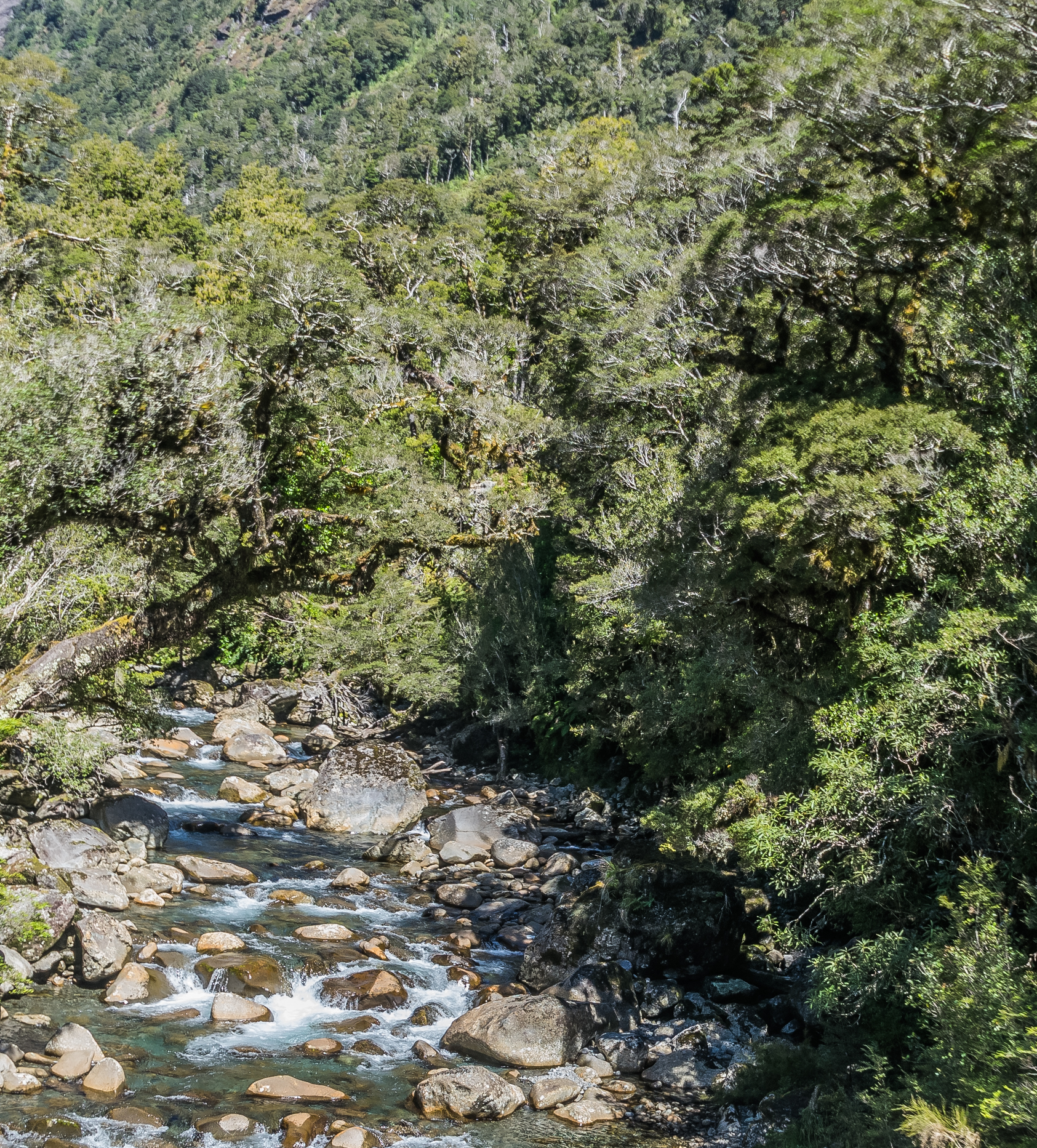
- Route of the Gulliver River
- Mouth of the Gulliver River Gulliver River (South Island) Gulliver River (New Zealand)

Location
- Country: New Zealand
- Region: Southland
- District: Southland

Physical characteristics
- Source
  - coordinates: 44°44′33″S 168°00′34″E
- Mouth
  - location: Cleddau River
  - coordinates: 44°42′14″S 167°58′06″E

Basin features
- Progression: Gulliver River → Cleddau River → Milford Sound → Tasman Sea

The Gulliver River is a river in the Fiordland area of New Zealand. It starts in the Darran Mountains on the north slope of Mount Talbot, and flows north and then west into the Cleddau River, which runs into Milford Sound. The river was named in 1906 by W.G. Grave for Alf Grenfell, who had a nickname of "Gulliver". A track along the Gulliver River from the Cleddau is suitable for day walks in summer and autumn and can be extended on the Grave Talbot Track into the Espereance valley, past the 59 m (194 ft) high De Lambert Falls and over the Grave Talbot Pass.

In 1975 three remaining kākāpō in the Esperance and Gulliver Valleys were moved to Maud Island.

== Esperance River ==
The Esperance River is a 3 km (1.9 mi) tributary flowing from the west off Mount Isolation. Large rimu and beech trees line the river up to about the 500 m (1,600 ft) contour.

== See also ==
- List of rivers of New Zealand
