= James Tibbs =

New Zealand school principal (1855–1924)

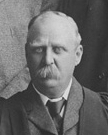
Tibbs in 1903

James William Tibbs CMG (27 October 1855 – 17 February 1924) was a New Zealand school principal who made a significant contribution to the development of secondary education in that country. He served as headmaster of Auckland Grammar School from 1893 to 1922. The student boarding house close to the school is named in his honour.

Tibbs was born in Hobart, Tasmania, Australia, in 1855. He was buried at Purewa Cemetery in the Auckland suburb of Meadowbank.

In the 1923 King's Birthday Honours, Tibbs was appointed a Companion of the Order of St Michael and St George for services to education.
