= Donne River =

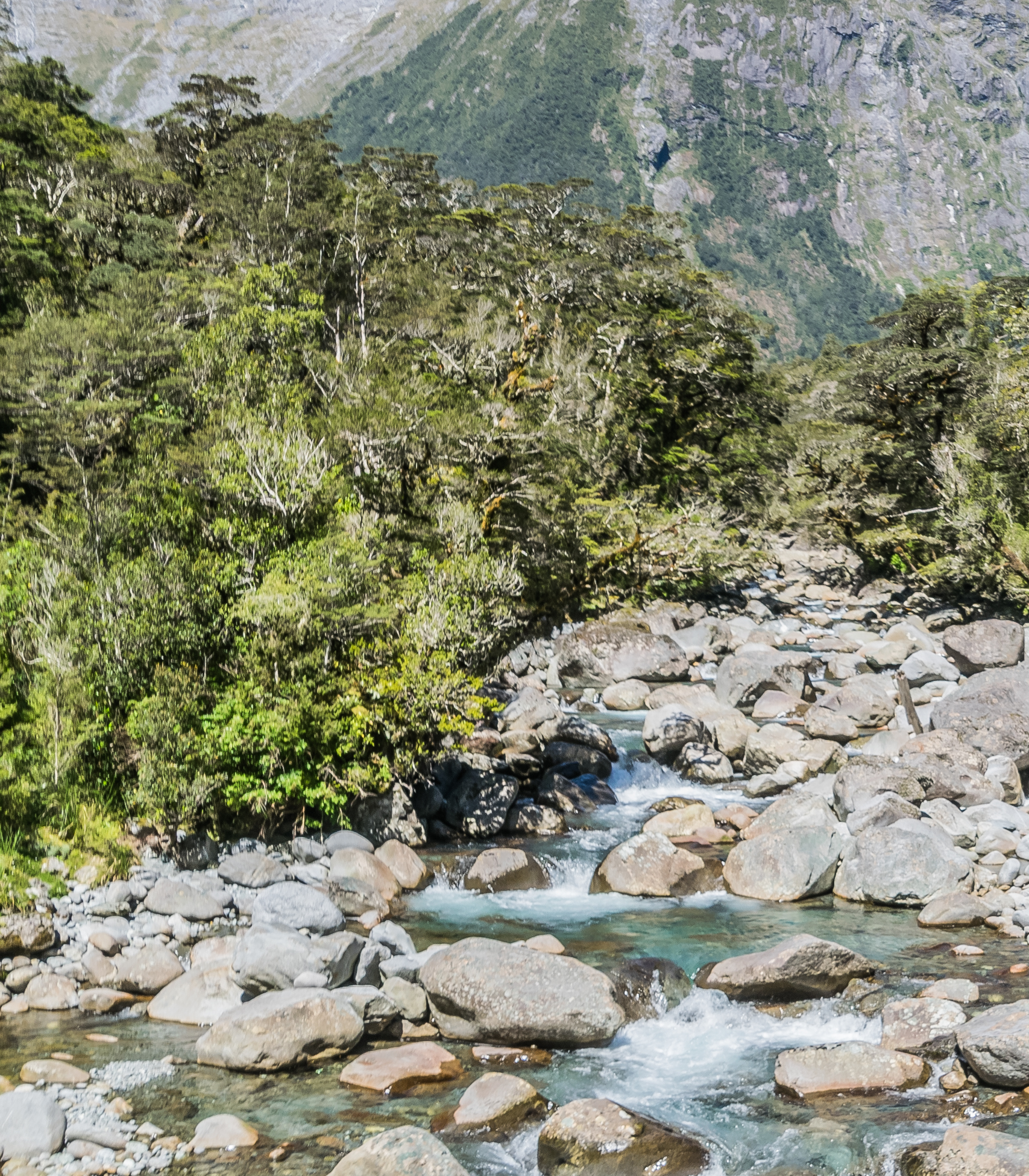
- Donne River in 2017
- Route of the Donne River
- Mouth of the Donne River Donne River (South Island) Donne River (New Zealand)

Location
- Country: New Zealand
- Region: Southland
- District: Southland

Physical characteristics
- Source
  - location: Taoka Icefall
  - coordinates: 44°40′37″S 168°02′22″E
  - elevation: 620 m (2,030 ft)
- Mouth
  - location: Cleddau River
  - coordinates: 44°42′09″S 167°58′06″E
  - elevation: 61 m (200 ft)
- Length: 4.5 km (2.8 mi)

Basin features
- Progression: Donne River → Cleddau River → Milford Sound → Tasman Sea

The Donne River is a river in the Southland Region of New Zealand. It arises in the Darran Mountains near Karetai Peak and flows south-west to join the Cleddau River. State Highway 94 crosses the Donne just before it reaches the Cleddau. The river was named by W. G. Grave in 1907 after Thomas Edward Donne, the General Manager of the Tourism Department.

== See also ==
- List of rivers of New Zealand
