= Cleddau River =

River in New Zealand

Cleddau River Cheddar River
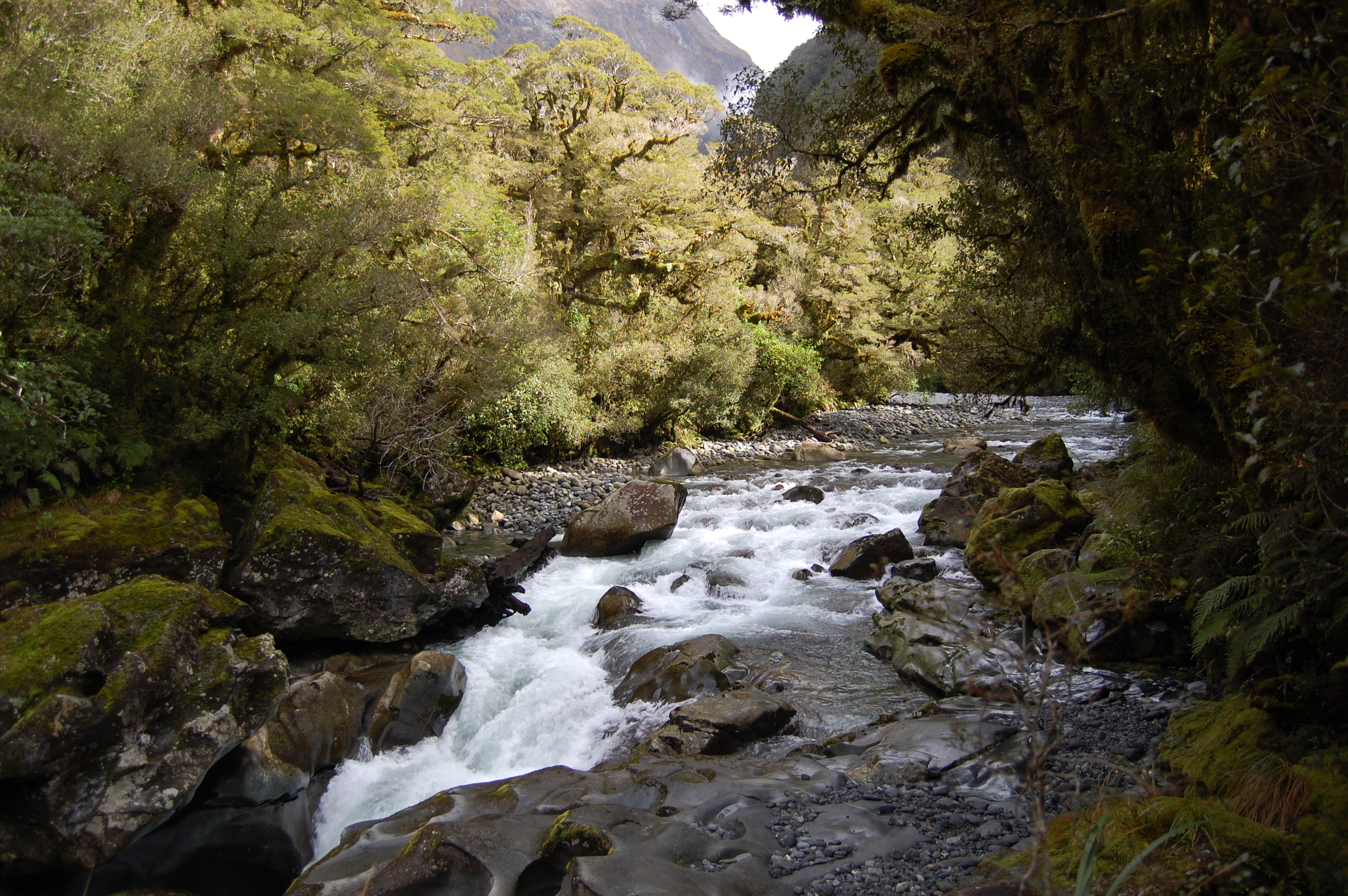
- Cleddau River in the Chasm
- Route of the Cleddau River
- Mouth of the Cleddau River Cleddau River (South Island) Cleddau River (New Zealand)

Location
- Country: New Zealand
- Region: Southland
- District: Southland

Physical characteristics
- Source: Cleddau River West Branch
  - location: Mount Ada
  - coordinates: 44°43′31″S 167°53′29″E
- 2nd source: Cleddau River North Branch
  - location: Te Pari / Sheerdown Peak
  - coordinates: 44°42′09″S 167°56′05″E
- 3rd source: Cleddau River South Branch
  - location: Homer Tunnel
  - coordinates: 44°45′53″S 167°58′46″E
- Mouth
  - location: Milford Sound
  - coordinates: 44°40′40″S 167°55′24″E
  - elevation: 0 metres (0 ft)

Basin features
- Progression: Cleddau River → Milford Sound → Tasman Sea
- Tributaries
  - right: Gulliver River, Donne River, Tūtoko River
- Waterbodies: The Chasm

The Cleddau River (also known as Waipāteke, Awa-piopiotahi and the Cheddar River) is a river of New Zealand in Fiordland, Southland. It flows into the head of Milford Sound.

== See also ==
- List of rivers of New Zealand
