= Tūtoko River =

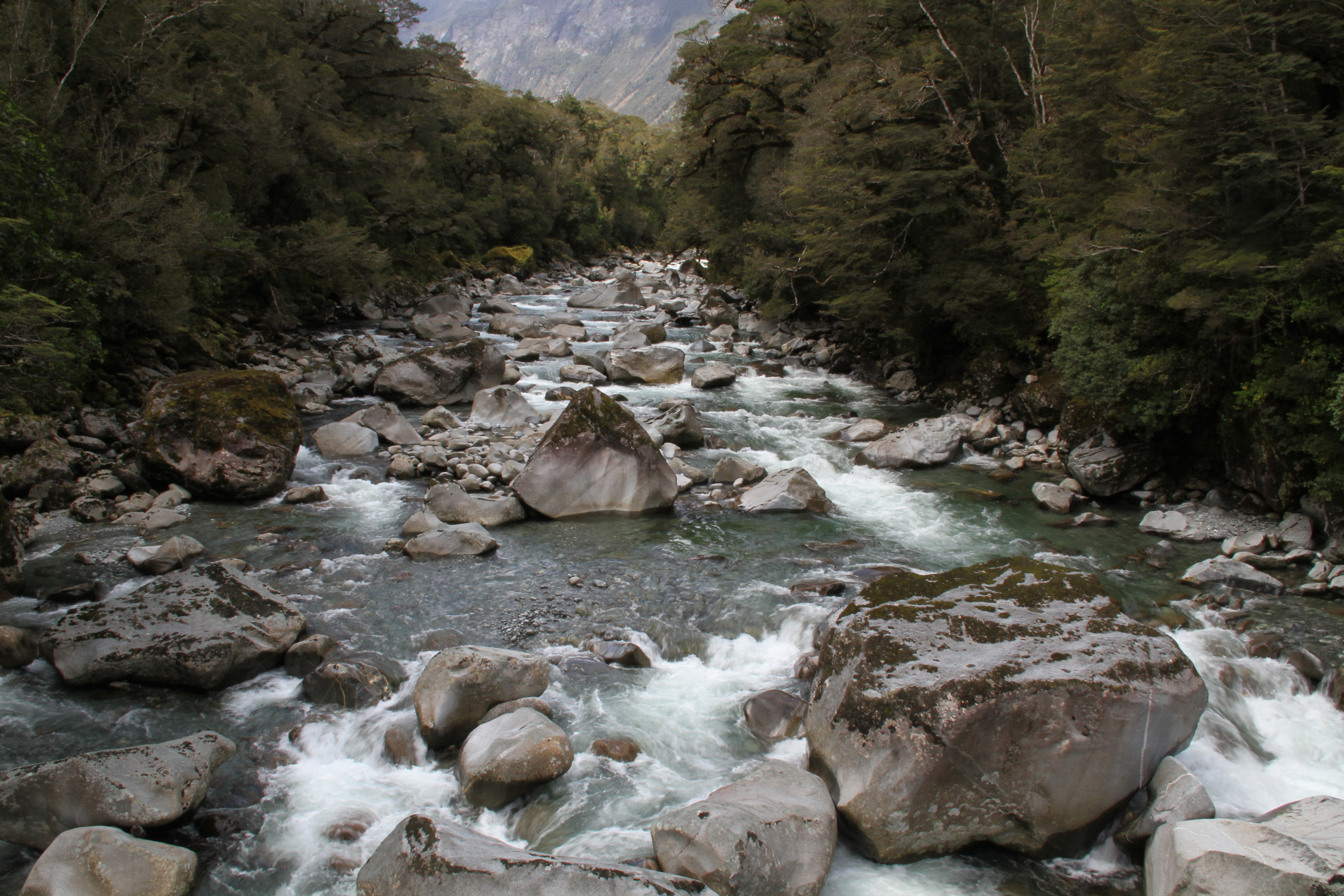
- Tūtoko River in 2016
- Route of the Tūtoko River
- Mouth of the Tūtoko River Tūtoko River (South Island) Tūtoko River (New Zealand)

Location
- Country: New Zealand
- Region: Southland
- District: Southland

Physical characteristics
- Source
  - location: Grave Couloir
  - coordinates: 44°35′15″S 167°59′16″E
  - elevation: 1,280 metres (4,200 ft)
- Mouth
  - location: Cleddau River
  - coordinates: 44°40′57″S 167°57′23″E
  - elevation: 25 metres (82 ft)
- Length: 12 kilometres (7.5 mi)

Basin features
- Progression: Tūtoko River → Cleddau River → Milford Sound → Tasman Sea

The Tūtoko River is a river located in the Darran Mountains in New Zealand. Originating from the western flank of Mount Tūtoko it is a tributary of the Cleddau River.

== See also ==
- List of rivers of New Zealand
