= Diwan Bhai Abdul Hamid =

Indian politician

Diwan Sir Abdul Hamid (also known as Khan Bahadur Abdul Hamid) born in Jalandhar was the Prime Minister of Kapurthala Princely State in India under the British Raj.
