= Thomas Donne =

New Zealand civil servant and collector

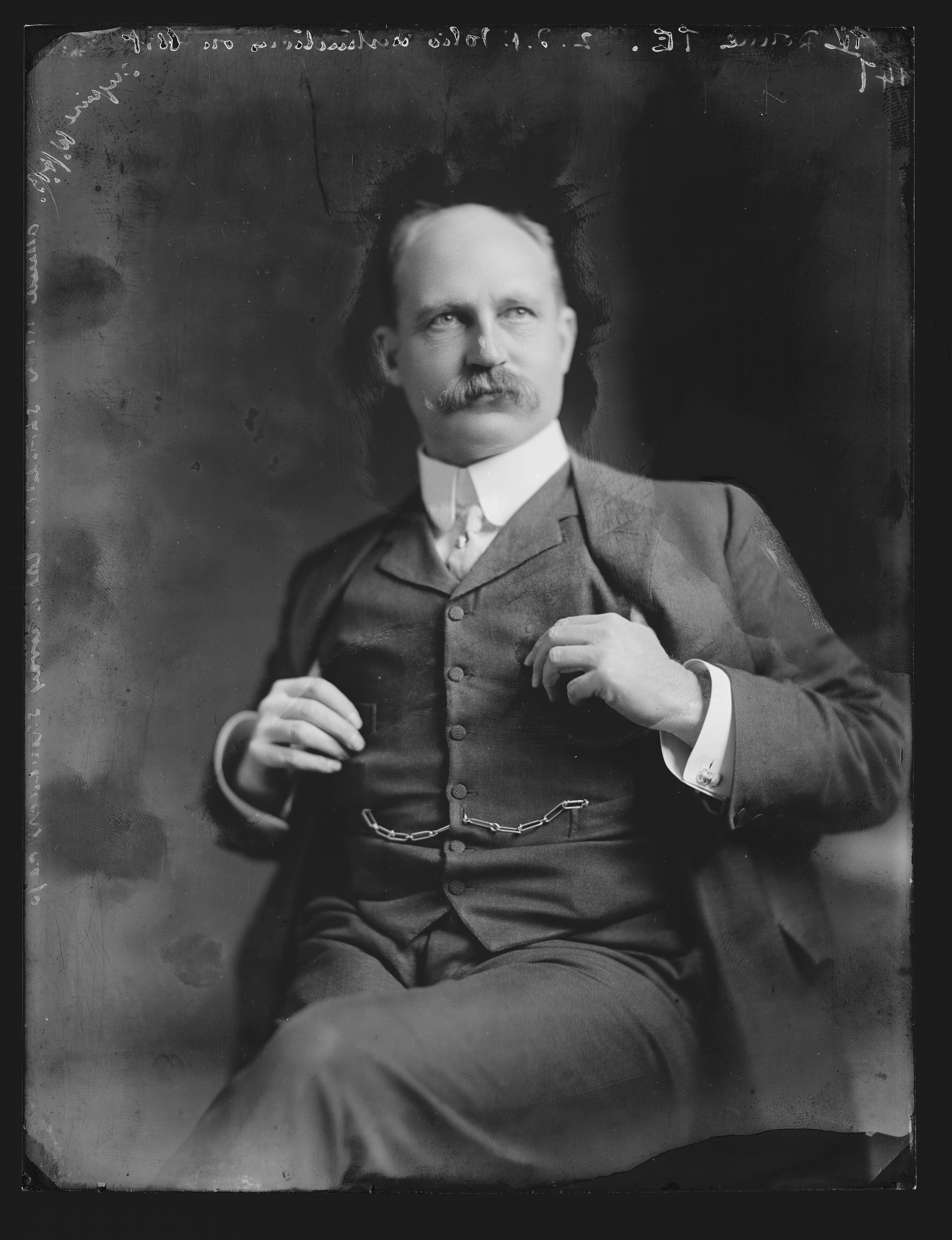

Thomas Edward Donne CMG (1860–1945) was a New Zealand civil servant, author, recreational hunter and collector of Māori antiquities and New Zealand fine art.

== Career ==
=== Railways Department ===
Donne was born in Melbourne, Australia in 1859, son of William Donne and Rosa Bennett. He entered the New Zealand civil service in 1875 as a cadet in the Telegraph Department, Wellington and was soon transferred south. It was during his time in the Telegraph Department that he first met Joseph Ward who was to be a lifelong government colleague. Donne was subsequently transferred to the Railways Department and in 1876 he was appointed stationmaster and postmaster at Caversham before being promoted to similar positions in larger towns. In 1885 Donne suffered a serious accident in Gore when he was thrown beneath a train but recovered after 6 months. He bore the scars of this accident for the rest of his life. After his health returned Donne continued his steady rise through the ranks of the Railways Department and was appointed stationmaster of Wellington in 1885 and District Traffic Manager in 1894. In December 1900 Donne left the Railways Department to serve as the undersecretary in the Department of Industries and Commerce.

=== Department of Tourist and Health Resorts ===
Donne had an interest in encouraging tourism since his time in the Railways Department and was also appointed the General Manager of the newly created Department of Tourist and Health Resorts. This department was in the portfolio of the MP Joseph Ward. Donne proved to be an extremely able manager. He reviewed different areas of the country and encouraged the improvement of the accommodation network for tourists nationwide. He opened information bureaux in all of New Zealand's major cities. He encouraged the development of tourist attractions and businesses, most notably in Rotorua, improved the government owned spas and health resorts, and oversaw the establishment of the scenic reserve network. The health resorts owned by the Government, such as Rotorua, Hanmer Springs and Te Aroha, were transferred to the department's control when it was created in 1901. Others were added or purchased during the following few years. By 1906 there were 17 reserves under control of the department. Donne served as a member of the Scenery Preservation Board and the Tongariro National Park Board. In 1909 Dunne was also appointed the General Manager of the Government Advertising Department.

Donne became heavily involved in promoting New Zealand trade and tourism at world and national fairs. In 1904 he was responsible for New Zealand's representation at the St Louis World's Fair exhibition. He organised a display to focus on the attractions of New Zealand for tourists and the work of his department. The exhibit included paintings and photographs of the scenery, hunting and fishing trophies and Māori culture. He arranged for 10 portraits of significant Māori by Gottfried Lindauer to be borrowed from the Partridge Collection for exhibition at this fair. He extended the exhibit to ensure that New Zealand products were featured including examples of wood and kauri gum, grains, wool and flax hemp. From 1906 Donne served as the vice-president and executive commissioner for the New Zealand International Exhibition. He traveled to the United States to encourage participation of overseas industry representatives at this Exhibition. He ensured that the Department of Tourist and Health Spa was well represented. The department had its own court and concentrated on themes similar to those displayed at the St Louis World's Fair. The court included promotion of New Zealand's hunting and fishing through numerous deer heads and stuffed fish, examples of kauri gum and fine timber, and paintings. There was also a working replica of a Rotorua hot pool and geyser.

=== High Commission, London ===
In 1909 Donne was appointed to the position of Trade and Immigration Commissioner at the New Zealand High Commission in London. After his arrival in London in July 1909 Donne set to work investigating the possibility of using Bristol as a port for New Zealand goods. Donne continued promote New Zealand trade and tourism in exhibitions during his time in the New Zealand High Commission. He contributed to New Zealand's presence at the Imperial International Exhibition, London in 1909; the International Sports Fair in Vienna, 1910; and was the chairman of the committee organising the New Zealand section of the pageant in the Festival of Empire in 1911. Donne ensured that the New Zealand pavilion at the Festival of Empire featured a Māori village and invited a Māori concert group from Te Arawa to London for the festival. The group featured the well-known guide from Rotorua, Guide Maggie Papakura.

Donne served as the Trade and Immigration Commissioner until 1916 when he was appointed to the position of Secretary to the High Commissioner for New Zealand until his retirement from government service in 1923. After his retirement Donne remained in the United Kingdom. He assisted with supplying material to the New Zealand court at the British Empire Exhibition.

== Personal life ==
Donne married Amy Kate Lucas in 1883. They had three sons – Cecil Lucas Donne (b. 1884), Basil Lucas Donne (b. 1885 -d.1945), and Lester Edward Lucas Donne (b. 1895). Donne was an extremely keen hunter and recreational fisherman. He was particularly fond of deer hunting and amassed a large collection of trophy heads. His interest in hunting was influential on the Department of Tourist and Health Resorts. During his time as General Manager the department arranged the importation and release in New Zealand of different species of game animals including Canada geese, red deer, wapiti, salmon, chamois and thar (the usual New Zealand spelling). It was while hunting that he found a complete skeleton of a Moa which he donated to the Dominion Museum.

== Collecting ==
He was also a collector of Māori antiquities and New Zealand fine art. His interest in Māori matters led him to record his findings and articles of interest in scrapbooks. When he left New Zealand for London he took some of his collection with him but the remainder was sold at auction on 18 and 19 May 1909 by H.J. Bethune & Co. When in London he continued to develop his collection and corresponded, purchased and swapped artifacts, works on paper and artworks with numerous other collectors including Horatio Gordon Robley,; Kenneth Athol Webster; and Alfred Walter Francis Fuller. One of the prime pieces in his collection was a small carved house named Te Wharepuni-a-Maui. He had commissioned this house to be carved for him in 1905 by the carvers Tene Waitere, Neke Kapua and Eramiha Neke Kapua. Te Wharepuni-a-Maui was first situated at the Whakarewarewa model village in Rotorua before being rented to the New Zealand International Exhibition. Donne took this house with him when he left New Zealand and it is likely to have also been included in other exhibitions he contributed to as a staff member of the New Zealand High Commission. This house is now in the collection of Linden Museum. Another significant collection he was associated with was a collection of New Zealand jade. This collection began with the New Zealand collector John White. On White's death in 1904 the collection of jade was sold to an Englishman named J. Struan Robertson who was touring New Zealand. It was shipped to England but only unpacked after the death of Robertson in 1912. The collection was offered for sale to museums by his daughter but only selected pieces were purchased by the British Museum, Bristol Museum, the Pitt-Rivers Museum and Devizes Museum. The rest of the collection was purchased by Donne. Donne split the collection and retained the hei tiki, pendants and other special pieces. He sold the remainder to the Field Museum. Donne later sold the pieces he retained to Armytage. On the death of Armytage, Kenneth Athol Webster ensured that the Armytage collection of jade was repatriated to New Zealand museums.

Donne donated, sold or auctioned parts of his collection throughout his life and items that had been owned by him can be found in:

- the collection of the Museum of New Zealand Te Papa Tongarewa
- the collection of the Alexander Turnbull Library
- the collection of the Field Museum
- the collection of the Linden Museum

== Writing ==
Donne wrote a number of books including:

- New Zealand Government catalogue of exhibits at the Louisiana Purchase Exposition, 1904, St. Louis, Missouri, Published 1904 by Little & Becker, St Louis.
- New Zealand : a fairyland of boiling fountains, vast glaciers, painted Maori and wingless birds, Published 1905
- The game animals of New Zealand : an account of their introduction, acclimatization, and development, Published 1924 by John Murray, London.
- Red deer stalking in New Zealand, Published 1924 by Constable & Company, London.
- The Maori past and present : an account of a highly attractive, intelligent people, their doubtful origin, their customs and ways of living, art, methods of warfare, hunting and other characteristics mental and physical, Published 1927 by Seeley Service, London. This was translated into French in 1938.
- Rod fishing in New Zealand waters : a description of a fisherman's paradise, Published 1927 by Seeley Service, London.

He also wrote the introduction to the book The First Ascent of Mount Ruapehu by George Beetham. Published by Harrison and Sons Limited, London, 1926.

Donne died in the United Kingdom in 1945. The balance of his collection of New Zealand watercolours, drawings, artifacts and natural history specimens was sold at Sotheby's London on 1 November 1973.

== Recognition ==
Donne was appointed a Companion of the Order of St Michael and St George in the 1923 King's Birthday Honours.

He had a number of geological features in New Zealand named after him including Donne River, which flows from the Donne Glacier. There is also a mountain, Mount Amy, named after his wife.
