= Alan Mark =

New Zealand botanist and environmentalist (born 1932)

Sir Alan Mark KNZM CBE
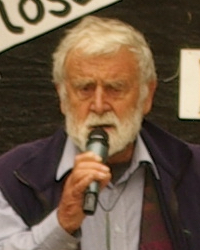
- Mark in 2013
- Born: Alan Francis Mark; 19 June 1932 (age 94); Dunedin, New Zealand
- Education: Duke University
- Known for: Save Manapouri campaign
- Spouse: Patricia Kaye Davie (m. 1957)
- Children: 4
- Awards: Loder Cup (1975)
- Scientific career
- Fields: Botany
- Workplaces: University of Otago
- Website: University of Otago profile

Sir Alan Francis Mark KNZM CBE (born 19 June 1932) is a New Zealand botanist and environmentalist. He was an initial member of the Save Manapouri campaign and the inaugural chair of the Guardians of Lake Manapouri for 26 years.

== Biography ==
Mark was born in 1932 in Dunedin. His parents were Frances Evelyn Mark (née Marshall) and Cyril Lionel Mark. He attended Mornington School in Dunedin and received his secondary education at Mosgiel District High School in Mosgiel. He then graduated from the University of Otago with a Bachelor of Science in 1953, and a Master of Science in 1955. He obtained his PhD from Duke University in North Carolina, United States, in 1958.

From 1958 to 1959, he was a plant ecologist for the Otago Catchment Board. Since 1960, he has been at the University of Otago; first as a lecturer, then reader, then associate professor, and (since 1975) professor. From 1960 to 1964, he was a research fellow for the Miss E. L. Hellaby Indigenous Grasslands Research Trust. During 1966, he was visiting professor at Duke University. He retired from Otago University in 1998 and has since been Emeritus Professor.

Mark was asked by the Department of Scientific and Industrial Research in October 1969 to study the lakeshore of Lake Manapouri to see what environmental effect could be expected from the proposed raising of the lake level by 27 metres (89 ft). A heated public debate started over the proposal and Mark was a founding member of the Save Manapouri campaign. The issue was significant in the 1972 general election, helped the Labour Party win and form the Third Labour Government of New Zealand, and Norman Kirk established the Guardians of Lake Manapouri. Mark was one of the six original Guardians and was the group's inaugural chairperson for 26 years.

Mark was a member of the Otago Catchment Board from 1974 to 1986. From 1981 to 1990, he was a member of the NZ National Parks and Reserves Authority. From 1984 to 1986, he held membership of the Land Settlement Board. He was a foundation member of the Native Forest Action Council. He was a member of the Otago Conservation Board and the group's chairperson for some time. He is a life member of Forest and Bird and was the group's president for some time.

== Honours and awards ==
In 1975, Mark won the Loder Cup, a New Zealand conservation award. He was elected Fellow of the Royal Society of New Zealand in 1978. In the 1989 New Year Honours, he was appointed Commander of the Order of the British Empire (CBE) for services to conservation. Mark received the Royal Society Te Apārangi's Hutton Medal in 1997.

In the 2001 New Year Honours, Mark was appointed Distinguished Companion of the New Zealand Order of Merit (DCNZM) for services to conservation. In the 2009 Special Honours, Mark accepted for his DCNZM to become a titular honour and thus became a Knight Companion (KNZM). In 2010, he won the Charles Fleming Award for Environmental Achievement. Otago University conferred an honorary Doctor of Science (DSc) on Mark in May 2014.

== Books by Mark ==
- Mark, Alan F.; Adams, Nancy M. (1979). New Zealand Alpine Plants. Wellington: Reed. ISBN 9780588010639.
- Mark, Alan F.; Galloway, David J. (2012). Above the Treeline: A Nature Guide to Alpine New Zealand. Nelson: Craig Potton Publishing. ISBN 9781877517761.
- Mark, Alan F. (2015). Standing My Ground: A voice for nature conservation. Dunedin: Otago University Press. ISBN 9781927322048.

== Family ==
In 1957, Mark married Patricia Kaye Davie. They were to have two daughters and two sons.
