= Ron McLean =

Ron McLean may refer to:

- Ron McLean (politician) (1938–1999), Australian politician
- Ron McLean (environmentalist) (1914–1980), New Zealand farmer, aviator, community leader and environmental campaigner
- Ron McLean (writer) (1944–1985), Australian screenwriter and producer
- Ron McLean (American football) (born 1963), American former NFL player

== See also ==
- Ron MacLean (born 1960), Canadian sportscaster
- Ronald McLean (1881–1941), British gymnast
- Ronnie McLean (born 1985), British-American rugby union player
