= Pearl Harbour, New Zealand =

Pearl Harbour
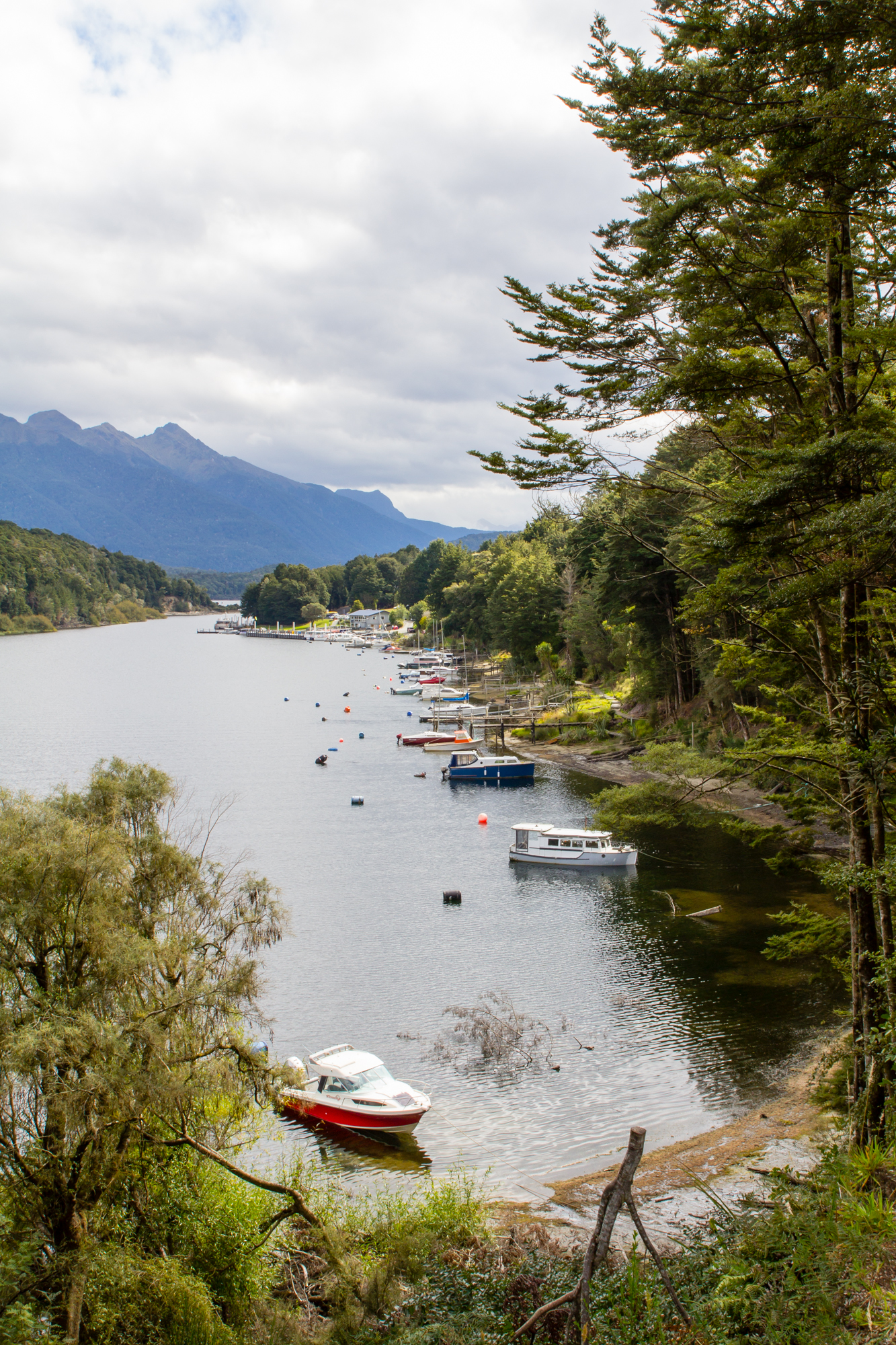
- Pearl Harbour

- Location Pearl Harbour (South Island) Pearl Harbour (New Zealand)
- Location: Manapouri, Fiordland, Southland District, New Zealand
- Coordinates: 45.57036°S 167.61181°E
- River sources: Waiau River
- Settlements: Manapouri

Pearl Harbour is a small harbour at the head of the Waiau River, in the town of Manapouri on the South Island of New Zealand.

The harbour and town are located at the south-east corner of Lake Manapouri. The name was given to the harbour soon after the Japanese attack on Pearl Harbor, Hawaii in 1941.

Pearl Harbour is used mainly by ferry and water taxi operators transporting Meridian Energy staff 35 kilometres (22 mi) across Lake Manapouri to the Manapouri Hydroelectric Power Station, on the West Arm of the lake. Ferries also carry tourists travelling to the power station and onwards to Doubtful Sound / Patea, located on the coast 10 km (6.2 mi) beyond the West Arm. It also provides easy access to Lake Manapouri for recreational boat users.
