= Pomona Island, New Zealand =

Island in New Zealand

Pomona Island
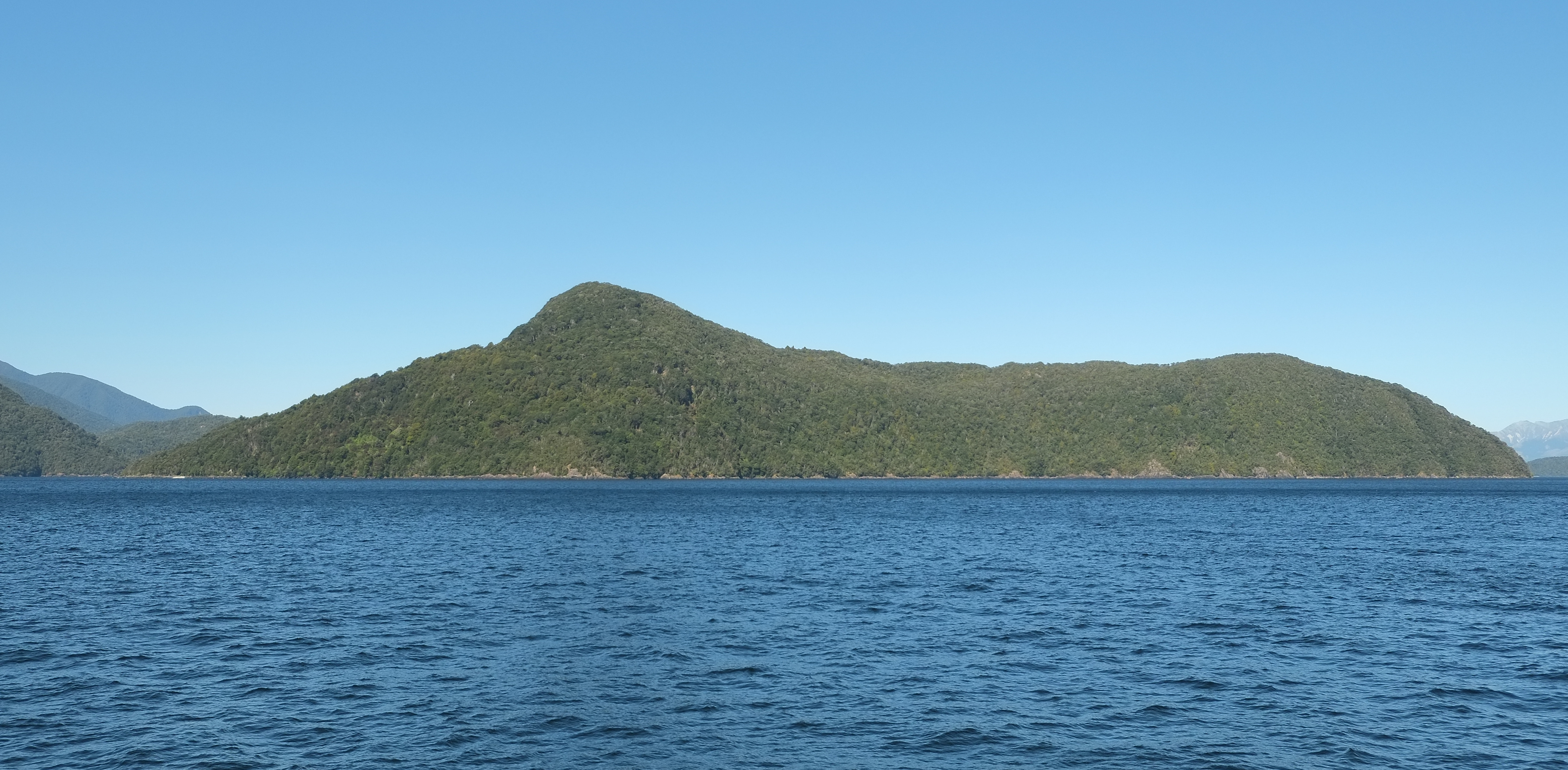
- Pomona Island in Lake Manapouri

- Location within New Zealand

Geography
- Location: Lake Manapouri
- Coordinates: 45°30′30″S 167°28′30″E
- Area: 2.62 km^{2} (1.01 sq mi)
- Length: 2 km (1.2 mi)
- Width: 2 km (1.2 mi)
- Highest elevation: 511 m (1677 ft)

Administration
- New Zealand

Pomona Island is the largest island within Lake Manapouri, in Fiordland National Park, in New Zealand's South Island. With an area of 262 hectares (650 acres), it is the largest island to be found within any New Zealand lake.

The island is uninhabited, and lies close to the entrance to the lake's southern arm, 11 kilometres to the west of Manapouri township. To its north, the island is separated from the mainland by the 500 metres (1,600 ft) wide Hurricane Passage. Pomona Island was named by surveyor James McKerrow in 1862 after the main island of Scotland's Orkney Islands.

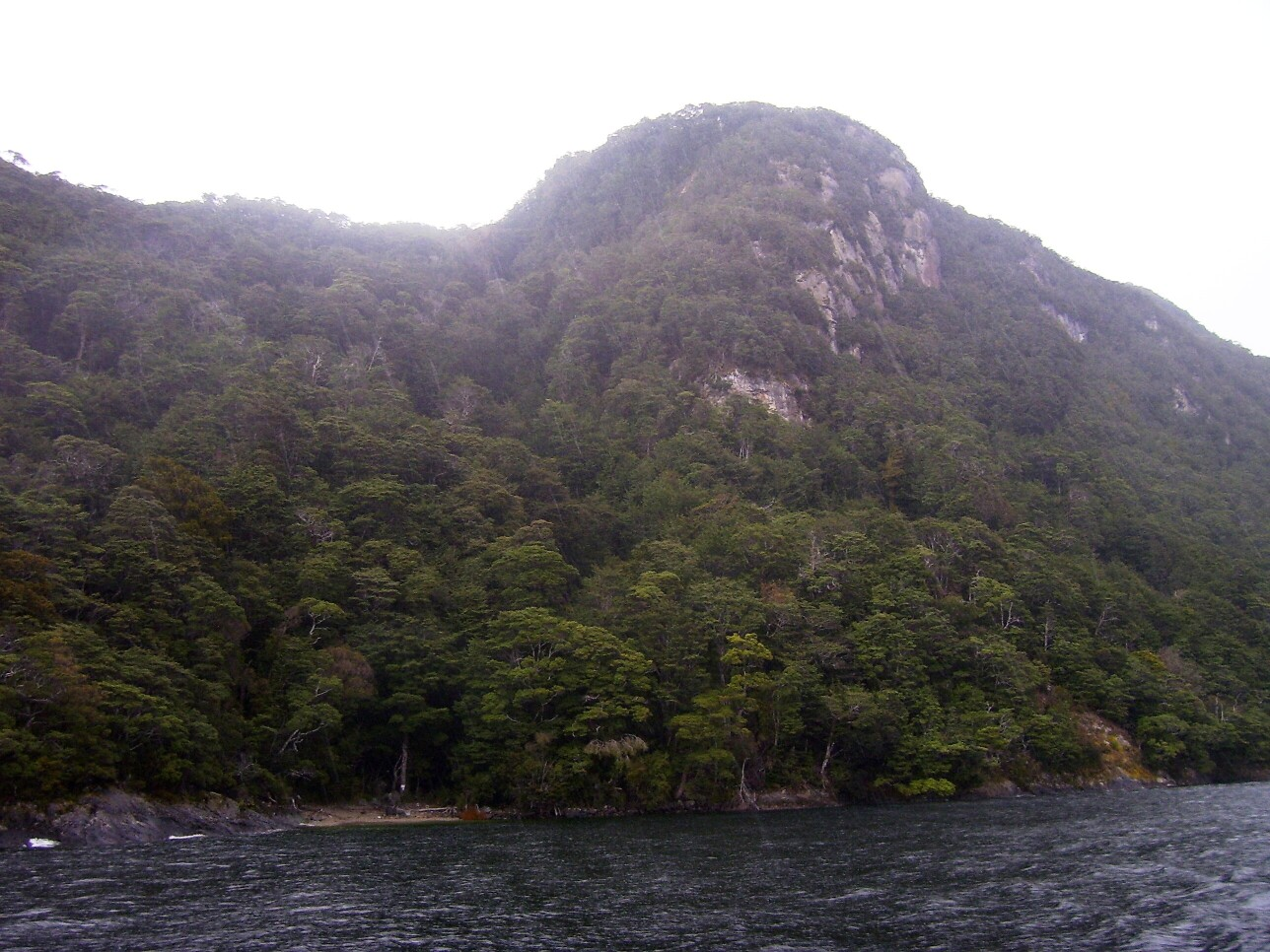
Pomona Island from Hurricane Passage

== Natural history ==
Forested areas of Fiordland National Park generally are dominated by beech and podocarp species with understory of numerous ferns and shrubs; crown fern (Lomaria discolor) is an example of chief understory species. Pomona Island is within this area of forest characterisation, and is almost entirely covered in native bush, with the forest also containing kāmahi and rātā. Since the eradication of all introduced animal pests, the health of the island's flora and birdlife has increased noticeably.

Pomona Island, geologically a round-topped granite hill, has given its name to a mineral form known as Pomona Granite.

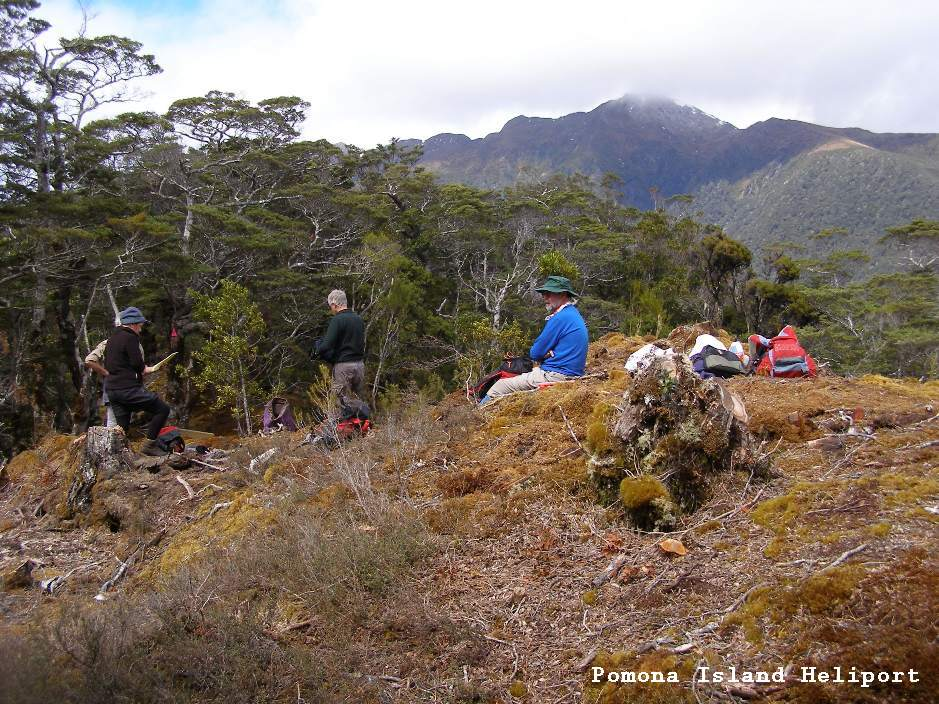
Pomona Island Trust Volunteers

== Pomona Island Charitable Trust ==
Pomona Island has its own Charitable Trust it was set up in July 2005 with the aim of restoring the largest inland island in New Zealand to its presumed natural state prior to the introduction of pests. The specific objectives of the Trust are to eradicate all mammalian pest species from Pomona Island ensuring a high quality of indigenous biodiversity on the island in terms of both flora and fauna. Also to reintroduce, through natural and assisted means, birdlife native to Fiordland within the Southwest New Zealand World Heritage Area and provide a safe habitat for endangered and threatened birds to breed thereby increasing the populations of individual species, to monitor conservation activities and their impact on the island's biodiversity.

== See also ==
- Desert island
- List of islands
