= Guardians of Lake Manapouri =

The Guardians of Lake Manapouri, Monowai and Te Anau is a statutory body appointed to make recommendations to the New Zealand Minister of Conservation on any matters arising from the environmental, ecological, and social effects of the operation of the Manapouri Power Station on the townships of Manapouri and Te Anau, Lake Manapouri and Lake Te Anau and their shorelines, and on the rivers flowing in and out of those lakes, having particular regard to the effects of the operation on social values, conservation, recreation, tourism, and related activities and amenities.

The Conservation Act 1987 sets out the functions and roles of the Guardians. Since 1998, the act stipulates that at least one Guardian must be a person nominated by Te Rūnanga o Ngāi Tahu.

The setting up of the Guardians was a result of the Save Manapouri campaign but came as a surprise. Shortly after the 1972 general election, the new prime minister, Norman Kirk, rang Alan Mark and asked him whether he would lead a group whose role it was to protect the lakes. The initial six Guardians, as chosen by Kirk, were all prominent leaders of the Save Manapouri Campaign. Mark became the inaugural chairperson and held this role for 26 years:

- Alan Mark (chairperson; later knighted)
- Ron McLean
- Wilson Campbell
- Les Hutchins
- John Moore
- Jim McFarlane

The current Guardians are:

- Darryl Sycamore (chair)
- Bill Jarvie
- Dave Riddell
- Dr. Jane Kitson (Ngāi Tahu representative)
- Madeleine Peacock (deputy chair)
- Sandra Cook (Ngāi Tahu representative)
- Dr. Sue Bennett
- Tom Ives
