= Lake2Lake Trail =

Trail in the South Island of New Zealand

- Length: 28.5 km (17.7 mi)
- Location: Southland District, New Zealand
- Trailheads: Te Anau, Manapouri
- Use: Walking; Cycling
- Difficulty: Easy
- Season: Year round
- Sights: Lake Te Anau, Lake Manapouri, Fiordland mountains
- Website: fiordlandtrails.nz/trails/lake2lake/

The Lake2Lake Trail is a shared-use trail between Te Anau and Manapouri in the South Island of New Zealand. The trail was established by the Fiordland Trails Trust, a charitable trust formed in 2007. Fundraising for the construction of the trail began in 2015.

The first 10 km (6.2 mi) section of the trail, from Te Anau to Queens Reach, was opened in 2016, and the second stage from Queens Reach to Balloon Loop was opened in 2017. When the full length of the 28.5 km (17.7 mi) route between Te Anau and Manapouri was completed in 2022, it included a 2 km (1.2 mi) section where riders had to use State Highway 95. The trust had been seeking to eliminate the section along the state highway by creating a trail through the Fiordland National Park, but this was not permitted by the current national park management plan. In 2023, an alternative route was chosen to move this section away from the state highway. The new section of trail is from Balloon Loop to Supply Bay Road, and when completed will allow the full length of the trail to be off-road.

An assessment of the economic impact of the Lake2Lake trail in 2023 claimed that it had contributed $3m to the local economy over a period of 12 months.

In the 27th annual Environment Southland Community Awards in 2023, the Fiordland Trails Trust was Highly Commended in the Environmental Action in the Community category.

In 2024, the trust announced that it had received approval to construct a 13 km (8.1 mi) section of new trail, running north from Te Anau to Boundary Creek, as part of plans to extend the network from the Lake2Lake Trail.
