= Ron McLean (environmentalist) =

New Zealand environmental campaigner

Ronald James McLean MBE
- Born: 22 January 1914; Wyndham, Southland, New Zealand
- Died: 26 May 1980 (aged 66)

Ronald James McLean MBE (22 January 1914 – 26 May 1980) was a New Zealand farmer, aviator, community leader and environmental campaigner. He was born in Wyndham, New Zealand, on 22 January 1914.

McLean is best known as spokesperson for the Save Manapouri campaign. He chaired the Southland committee of the group and travelled the country, speaking to numerous audiences. In the end, there were 19 committees throughout the nation and McLean had helped establish most of them. After the 1972 general election brought a change of government, the Labour Party made good of its election promise and appointed six Guardians of Lake Manapouri in 1973. McLean was a Guardian until his death.

In the 1974 New Year Honours, McLean was appointed a Member of the Order of the British Empire, for services to the community.

McLean died at Kennington on 26 May 1980 aged 66.
