= Tiwai Point Aluminium Smelter =

Aluminium smelter in New Zealand

Coordinates: 46.589184°S 168.384022°E

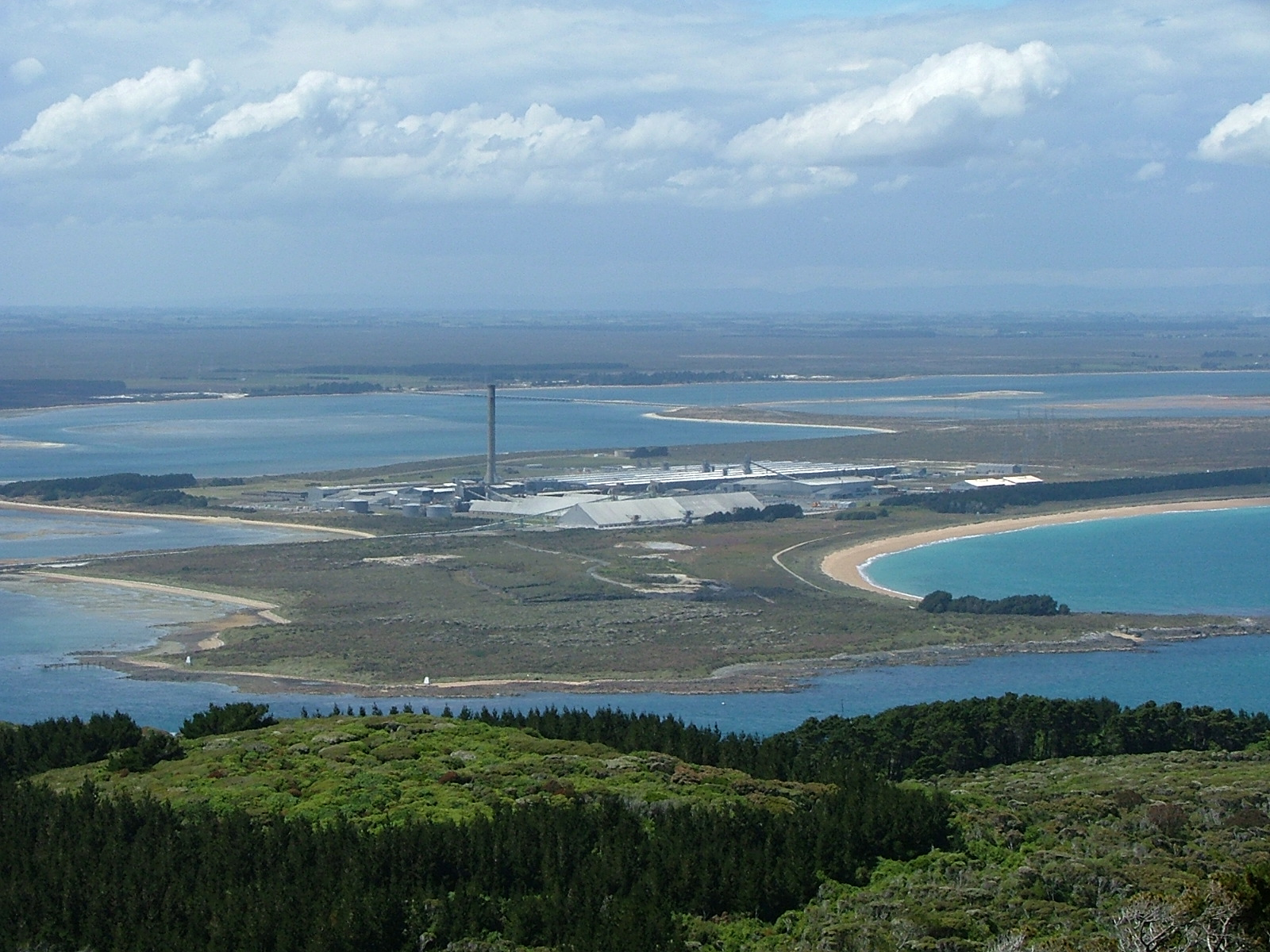
Tiwai Point Aluminium Smelter as seen from the top of Bluff Hill

Location of Tiwai Point within New Zealand

The Tiwai Point Aluminium Smelter is an aluminium smelter owned by Rio Tinto Group, via a joint venture called New Zealand Aluminium Smelters (NZAS) Limited.

The facility, New Zealand's only aluminium smelter, is at Tiwai Point, near Bluff. It imports alumina and processes it into primary aluminium. The plant's alumina is supplied from refineries in Queensland and the Northern Territory of Australia. Around 90 per cent of the aluminium produced at NZAS is exported, mainly to Japan.

The smelter was opened in 1971 following the construction of the Manapouri Power Station by the New Zealand government to supply it with electricity. It uses 13 percent of New Zealand's electricity, and is reported to account for 10 percent of the Southland region's economy.

Rio Tinto has threatened to close the smelter several times, for example in 2013 and 2020, but to date closure has been deferred after renegotiation of the price it pays for electricity. In 2021, Rio Tinto announced that it had agreed to pay a lower price to its power supplier Meridian Energy in return for keeping the smelter running until December 2024. In July 2022, NZAS signalled that it would once again offer to remain open if it could secure new power agreements on favourable terms.

In May 2024, new twenty-year electricity contracts were agreed with three suppliers, allowing the smelter to remain open until 2044. In May 2026, the smelter announced plans to re-open the fourth potline, using power from a new Southland Wind Farm to be built by Contact Energy.

There are concerns regarding the environmental legacy of waste stockpiled at the site, near to an eroding beachline.

== History ==
In 1955, a geologist working for Consolidated Zinc Proprietary Ltd (ConZinc) identified a commercial deposit of bauxite in Australia on the west coast of Cape York Peninsula. The company investigated sources of large quantities of cheap electricity needed to reduce the alumina recovered from the bauxite into aluminium. In 1960, ConZinc reached an agreement with the government for it to build a smelter and power station using the hydroelectric capacity of Lake Manapouri and Lake Te Anau. In 1963, ConZinc decided not to build the power station, and following that decision the government decided to construct it, with power first being generated in 1969. Construction of the Manapouri Power Station attracted controversy for its environmental effects, with over 264,000 New Zealanders signing the Save Manapouri petition. With a supply of electricity to be available, ConZinc built the Tiwai Point smelter, opening in 1971. Before construction of the smelter archaeological excavations were carried out in 1968 led by Stuart Park; evidence of an extensive Māori adze manufacturing site and middens was uncovered. Eleven tonnes of artefacts and material were retrieved from the site including adzes, hammer-stones and sinkers made from local argillite.

The original ownership was 50% Comalco, 25% Sumitomo Chemical Company and 25% Showa Denko KK. Until 2024, NZAS was owned by Rio Tinto Group (79.36%) and the Sumitomo Group (20.64%), Tiwai Point is the only aluminium smelter in New Zealand. In December 1980, the government announced a project that would build a second smelter at Aramoana, but opposition from the public, changes in the aluminium market, and the loss of a commercial partner meant the project did not go ahead.

== Operations ==
The smelter uses the Hall–Héroult process to convert alumina (aluminium oxide) to elemental aluminium. Bauxite is mined in Australia and refined into alumina before being shipped to New Zealand. The smelter consists of three lines of P69 technology cells, with 208 cells each (i.e. 624 total), and one line of 48 CD200 technology cells. The third P69 Line was built in the early 1980s as part of the Muldoon government's "Think Big" projects.

The smelter produces the world's purest aluminium – 99.98 percent pure – and is one of two smelters in the world producing ultrahigh purity aluminium. In 2011 the smelter produced 354,030 saleable tonnes of aluminium, which was its highest ever output at the time. In 2015, it produced 335,290 tonnes.

== Financial results ==
Taken from the Statistical Review of Comalco's New Zealand Activities, page 22 of the 1993 Annual Report.

Year   Tonnes   Aluminium Price  Net Profit    Employees
1979  153,537    1575             -1,172,000     1,252  
1980  154,740    1770             17,470,000     1,258  
1981  153,979    1302              2,941,000     1,359  
1982  163,419    1026            -20,698,000     1,452  
1983  218,609    1478             -9,665,000     1,651  
1984  242,850    1281              1,766,000     1,631  
1985  240,835    1072            -24,772,000     1,529  
1986  236,332    1160            -18,188,000     1,506  
1987  248,365    1496             92,570,000     1,429  
1988  257,006    2367            173,040,000     1,770  
1989  258,359    1915            118,500,000     1,820  
1990  259,408    1635             42,051,000     1,720  
1991  258,790    1333            -34,122,000     1,465  
1992  241,775    1279            -18,649,000     1,415  
1993  267,200    1161            -18,016,000     1,465

The smelter production is in tonnes of saleable metal, the aluminium price is the average London Metal Exchange 3 month in US$/tonne, the Net Profit/Loss is after tax and NZ$. The employee count includes contract employees and the full-time equivalent of part-time employees. Comalco-CHH Aluminium employees are not included from 1990; 425 were employed in 1993.

== Electricity use ==
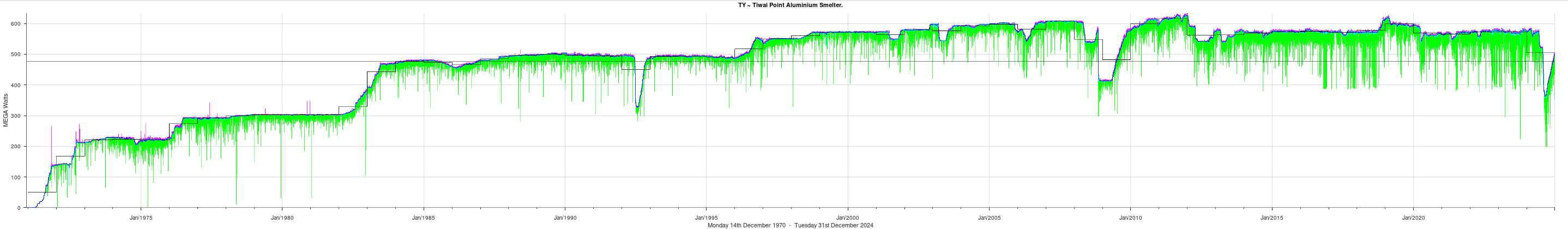
Electricity usage 1970 to 2024

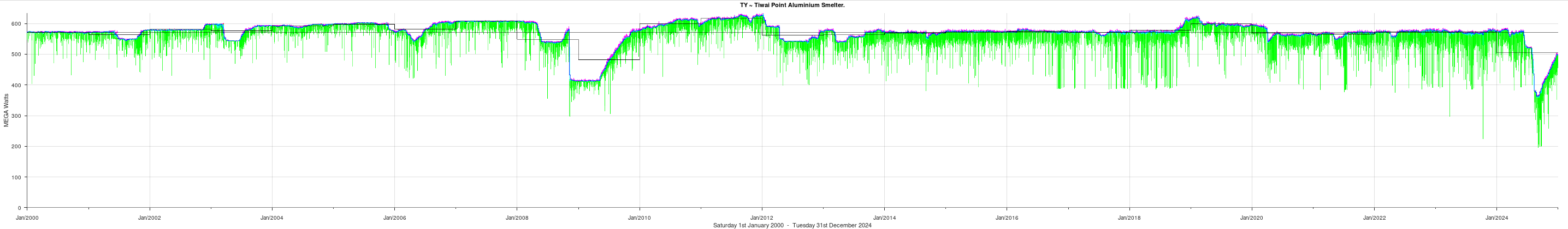
Electricity usage 2000 to 2024

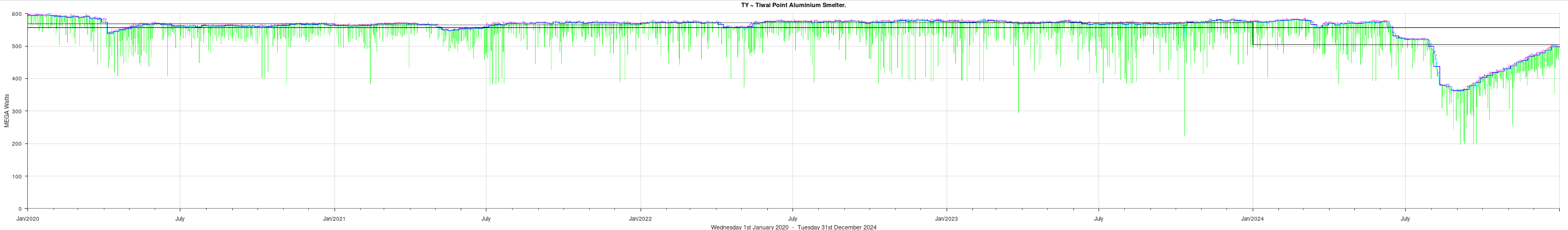
Electricity usage 2020 to 2024

The smelter's power demand from the national grid is about 570 MW. Most of the energy for the smelter is supplied from the Manapouri hydroelectric power station, via two double circuit 220 kV transmission lines. The facility is the largest electricity consumer in New Zealand. It uses about one third of the total electricity consumed in the South Island and 13% of the total electricity nationwide, equivalent to around 680,000 households.

New Zealand Aluminium Smelters had a contract for electricity supply with Meridian Energy for the continuous supply of 572 megawatts for the period 2013 to 2030. The price it pays for electricity was renegotiated in 2015 and 2021. The 2021 agreement was reported to have reduced the price from 5.5 to 3.5c per kWh, with the smelter scheduled to close in 2024.

== Environmental effects ==
Aluminium smelting via the Hall–Héroult process produces carbon dioxide as a by-product. The basic reaction is Al_{2}O_{3} → 2Al + 3"O". Oxygen equivalents react at the red-hot carbon anode, forming a mixture of carbon monoxide (that subsequently becomes carbon dioxide once released to the atmosphere) and carbon dioxide. For one tonne of aluminium, 1.55 tonnes of CO result, becoming 2.4 tonnes of CO_{2}. However, if all the oxygen were instead directly converted to CO_{2}, then only 1.56 tonnes of CO_{2} would result. At the stated rate of 1.97 tonnes of carbon dioxide per tonne of aluminium, the production of 272,000 tonnes of aluminium in a year would emit 535,000 tonnes of carbon dioxide. In 2007, Tom Campbell, the chief executive of majority owner Rio Tinto Aluminium NZ, said that the smelter was among the top 5% of the world's 250 aluminium smelters in terms of low emissions. Metal produced by Tiwai Point is marketed under the RenewAl brand, which according to NZAS guarantees that less than four tonnes of CO_{2} is emitted for every tonne of aluminium produced.

Significant amounts of hazardous waste have been stored at the site, mainly spent cell liner (also known as spent pot lining) containing compounds including fluoride and cyanide. Estimates of the waste stockpiled at the site range up to a quarter of million tonnes. It has been described as uncontrolled, unconsented and untreated in complete absence of any regulatory oversight or recognition, being the largest stockpile of hazardous waste in Australasia and posing an estimated $NZ300 million liability. Rio Tinto has committed $NZ4 million towards the removal of all aluminium dross and ouvea premix.

8,000 tonnes of aluminium dross from the smelter were stored without consent in Mataura from 2015 until 2021. If flooded by the nearby Mataura river, this "ouvea premix" would have released ammonia gas. The New Zealand government subsidised New Zealand Aluminium Smelters to remove the toxic waste, which was achieved by July 2021.

== Economic effects and threats of closure ==
NZAS reported that the facility employed 800 full-time employees and contractors in 2017, and indirectly supported jobs for 3,000 people. The smelter is reported to account for 10 percent of the Southland region's economy.

Tiwai Point has frequently operated at a loss, such as in 2012 when it lost $548 million. Analysts have commented that the profitability of the smelter is most dependent on prices for electricity, alumina and the finished aluminium as well as on the New Zealand dollar's foreign exchange rates. Between 2008 and 2013, aluminium prices fell by more than 30 percent. Rio Tinto threatened to close the Tiwai Point smelter if either it could not get a cheaper deal for electricity from retailer Meridian, or if the Government failed to give it a substantial subsidy to cover losses.

In 2013, Rio Tinto again threatened to shut down the smelter unless it was able to agree favourable electricity prices with Meridian Energy. Meridian was one of several state-owned enterprises which at the time were proposed for privatisation by the John Key National Government. The government wanted to get the maximum possible sale price, which would potentially conflict with Rio Tinto's desire for low electricity prices. As a result, the Government announced it would subsidise Rio Tinto to keep the Tiwai Point smelter operating in the short term, garnering criticism from business commentators and opposition politicians. However, on 2 April 2013, John Key said Rio Tinto had rejected the Government's offer, preferring a "longer-term deal than the Government was prepared to offer". John Key stated that if the smelter couldn't sustain itself financially, the government was not interested in keeping it open long-term.

Much media commentary in April 2013 focused on the impact of closure on both domestic power prices and share prices when the State-owned enterprise and electricity generator Mighty River Power would be partially sold off to private investors. NZAS produced a report which claimed that if the smelter closed, there would be a permanent loss to Southland's GDP of about 7-8 percent and that 2-3 percent of Southland's population could move out of the region. Invercargill mayor Tim Shadbolt said it was a myth that closing the smelter would result in lower power prices for others, and vowed to keep it open.

In August 2013, the New Zealand government agreed to make a $30 million payment to NZAS as a deal to support the smelter and to save jobs, in exchange for agreeing the smelter could be closed before January 2017. Finance Minister Bill English said the Government would make no further contribution to support it, which he reiterated in 2015 following speculation that Rio Tinto was seeking to sell the smelter.

In 2016, an analyst at First New Zealand Capital (FCNZ) utilities said that the smelter was thought to be breaking even, helped by favourable currency rates and low alumina prices.

=== Price negotiations, 2019 to 2024 ===
In October 2019, Rio Tinto announced a strategic review of the Tiwai Point Aluminium Smelter, including a wide range of issues associated with closure. The NZAS chief executive Stew Hamilton said that they had been losing money for the previous 12 months, and that options ranged from operating at the status quo, which would require cheaper power, to closure of the plant.

During New Zealand's lockdown for the Covid-19 pandemic, the smelter was deemed an essential service and exempt from restrictions.

On 31 March 2020, Rio Tinto announced that it would close potline four, to ensure it could cope with the restrictions at the plant that are needed because of the coronavirus pandemic. Potline 4 originally opened in 1996 but was turned off for six years between 2012 and 2018 before reopening as a result of an uptick in aluminium prices and a new deal with power supplier Meridian. Potline four is smaller than the smelter's other three potlines, producing about 31,000 tonnes of aluminium a year, about 9 per cent of the smelter's total output, and consumes about 50 MW of electricity.

On 9 July 2020, Rio Tinto again announced that it would close the smelter. The company said that it would wind down operations and end New Zealand Aluminium Smelters Limited after a strategic review that "showed the business is no longer viable given high energy costs and a challenging outlook for the aluminium industry". The company stated that 1000 jobs would be directly lost from the closure, and 1600 jobs indirectly connected to the smelter would also be under threat. The decision followed a 25% decrease in aluminium prices over the prior 18 months, and increasing power costs. At that time, Rio Tinto said it intended to close the smelter in August 2021.

The smelter featured in the 2020 general election, with many parties pledging to keep – or try to keep – the smelter running for at least some time. The National Party announced that, if it won the election, it would keep the smelter running for at least five years and would facilitate negotiations between Rio Tinto, power companies and Transpower to achieve a more cost-competitive environment. New Zealand First leader Winston Peters said that keeping the smelter open would be a bottom line in any coalition negotiations, and that he had a 20-year plan for the smelter. The Government ruled out any further bailouts of the company. Prime Minister and Labour leader Jacinda Ardern initially said that a Government project to widen the Homer Tunnel would provide some local jobs, but that no one industry could offset the job losses. Later, Labour announced that it would negotiate to extend the life of the smelter by three to five years if elected, seeking to protect jobs in the short term to provide time for the community to consider alternative options. Local politicians also lobbied the Government to preserve the smelter in some way.

In January 2022, Rio Tinto and Meridian Energy agreed to continue Tiwai Point's operations until December 2024, with 100 MW of its baseline power to be supplied by Contact Energy. The price reduction was later reported to have been from 5.5c to 3.5c per kWh, but with no change to transmission fees.

In July 2022, NZ Aluminium Smelters announced that it would seek new power supplies to try and remain open beyond the scheduled 2024 closure date, this time suggesting a new strategy of seeking power from suppliers other than Meridian Energy.

=== Twenty year supply contracts ===
After two years of negotiations, new supply contracts were agreed in May 2024 between the smelter and three electricity suppliers: Mercury, Contact Energy and Meridian Energy. The contracts are for a twenty-year term, and include some changes in contract conditions. The smelter is now required to give at least two years' notice of closure, and there are penalty payments of at least $180 million for early closure. The new contracts also include requirements for the smelter to provide a demand response capability to reduce demand by up to 185 MW during times when the electricity system is under stress. The supply new contracts were expected to provide greater certainty for the electricity sector as a whole, and lead to new generation proposals going ahead.

=== Fourth potline reopening ===
A restart of the Line 4 potline was announced in 2026, after Rio Tinto agreed to purchase 50MW from a new Southland Wind Farm to be built by Contact Energy.
