= Manapouri =

Town in Fiordland, New Zealand

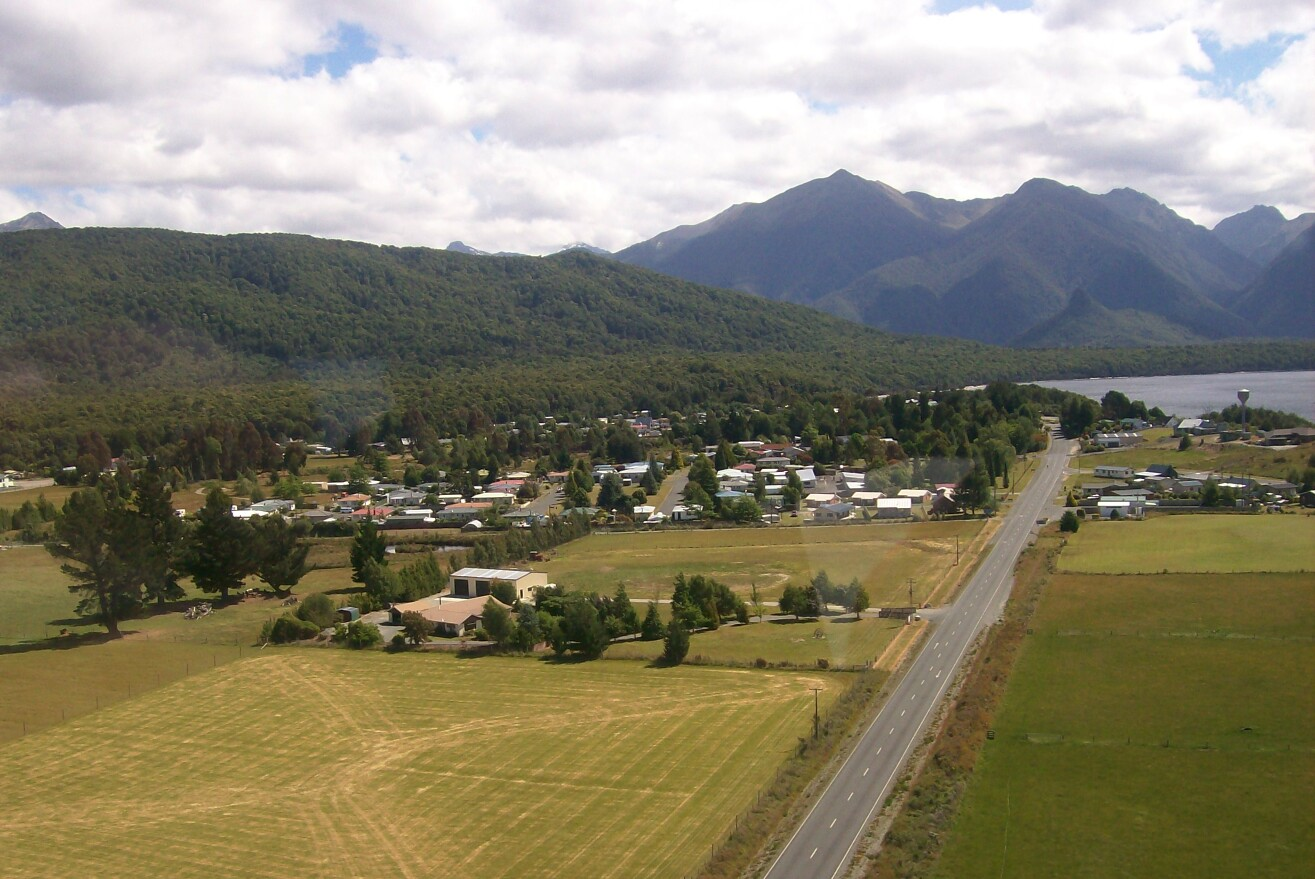
- Manapouri township
- Interactive map of Manapouri
- Coordinates: 45.5669°S 167.6115°E
- Country: New Zealand
- Island: South Island
- Region: Southland region
- Territorial authorities of New Zealand: Southland District
- Ward: Mararoa Waimea Ward
- Community: Fiordland Community
- Electorates: Southland; Te Tai Tonga (Māori)

Government
  - Territorial authority: Southland District Council
  - Regional council: Southland Regional Council
  - Mayor of Southland: Rob Scott
  - Southland MP: Joseph Mooney
  - Te Tai Tonga MP: Mananui Ramsden

Area
  - Total: 1.36 km^{2} (0.53 sq mi)
- Elevation: 200 m (660 ft)

Population (June 2025)
  - Total: 270
  - Density: 200/km^{2} (510/sq mi)
- Local iwi: Ngāi Tahu

Manapouri is a small town in Southland / Fiordland, in the southwest corner of the South Island, in New Zealand. The township is the westernmost municipality in New Zealand. Located at the edge of the Fiordland National Park, on the eastern shore of Lake Manapouri, close to its outflow into the Waiau River, tourist boat services are based in the town.

Manapouri township is a 20-minute drive from Te Anau via State Highway 95 The town is the gateway to both Doubtful Sound and Dusky Sound and the starting point for many local walking tracks. It is a popular tourist destination, particularly during the summer months.

== History ==
At the intersection of State Highway 95 and Hillside Road is a monument to the Save Manapouri campaign which marks the first mass environmental movement in New Zealand history.

The Manapouri Hydroelectric Power Station is located on the West Arm of Lake Manapouri, with most of the electricity generated serving the Tiwai Point Aluminium Smelter Workers at the power plant are ferried by boat from Manapouri, as there is no road access to the power station. Manapouri was declared the "highest consumer of water" in New Zealand in 2010 because of the power station, which consumes 41 percent of the fresh water consumed by the entire country. In 2002, the Government rejected an application of a business, Southland Water 2000, to bottle 40,000 cubic metres of water in 20 hours, twelve times a year, before the water from the power station is released into Doubtful Sound.

== Demographics ==
Manapouri is described by Statistics New Zealand as a rural settlement. It covers 1.36 km^{2} (0.53 sq mi), and had an estimated population of 270 as of June 2025, with a population density of 199 people per km^{2}. It is part of the larger Mararoa statistical area.

Historical population for Manapouri
Year	Pop.	±% p.a.
2006	294	—
2013	201	−5.29%
2018	222	+2.01%
2023	270	+3.99%

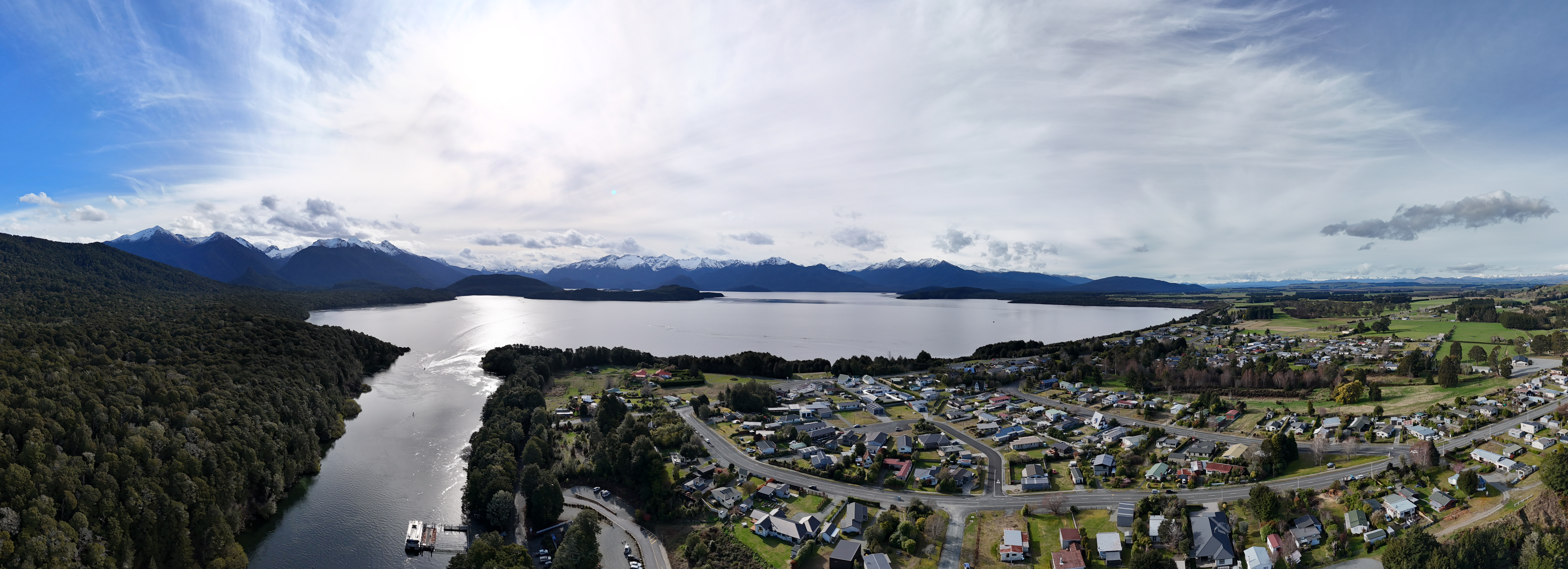
Aerial panorama of Manapouri, with Pearl Harbour in the left-bottom corner

Manapouri had a population of 222 at the 2018 New Zealand census, an increase of 21 people (10.4%) since the 2013 census, and a decrease of 72 people (−24.5%) since the 2006 census. There were 102 households, comprising 117 males and 108 females, giving a sex ratio of 1.08 males per female. The median age was 56.8 years (compared with 37.4 years nationally), with 21 people (9.5%) aged under 15 years, 30 (13.5%) aged 15 to 29, 111 (50.0%) aged 30 to 64, and 63 (28.4%) aged 65 or older.

Ethnicities were 94.6% European/Pākehā, 9.5% Māori, 1.4% Asian, and 4.1% other ethnicities. People may identify with more than one ethnicity.

Although some people chose not to answer the census's question about religious affiliation, 54.1% had no religion, 41.9% were Christian and 2.7% had other religions.

Of those at least 15 years old, 30 (14.9%) people had a bachelor's or higher degree, and 51 (25.4%) people had no formal qualifications. The median income was $30,400, compared with $31,800 nationally. 15 people (7.5%) earned over $70,000 compared to 17.2% nationally. The employment status of those at least 15 was that 108 (53.7%) people were employed full-time, and 36 (17.9%) were part-time.

== Facilities and attractions ==
Commercial services include a petrol station/garage, art gallery, cafes, shops, two restaurant and bars as well as overnight hotel, motel and motor camp accommodations. The small Te Anau Airport is situated 5 kilometres (3.1 mi) north of the township and serves both Te Anau and Manapouri.

There are several tourist boat excursions based in Manapouri to service the Fiordland Sounds to fishing charters and boat hire. Excursions originating at Pearl Harbour at the southern end of Manapouri township take tourists across Lake Manapouri to view the underground hydroelectric facility, or continue on by bus over Wilmot Pass to boat tours of Doubtful Sound, adding up to a full day trip.

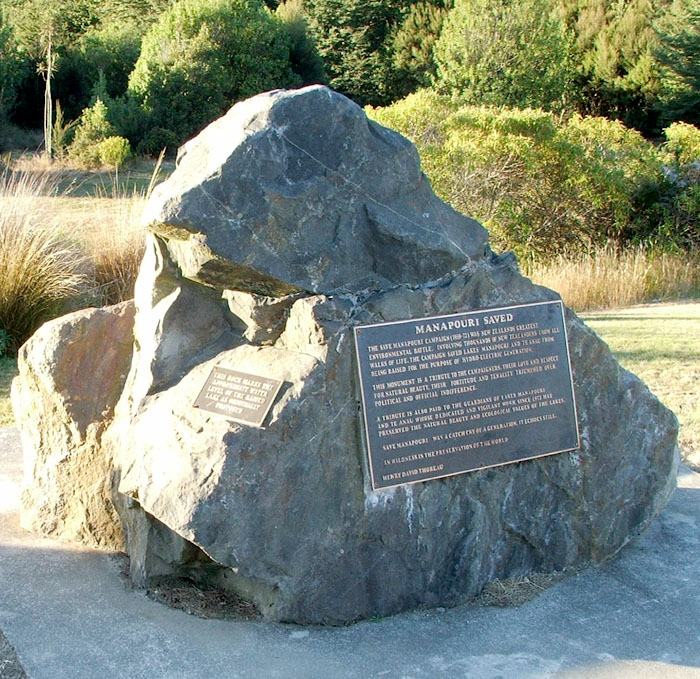
The Save Manapouri memorial rock

=== Walkways and cycleways ===
Day walks are the Circle Track, the Hope Arm Track, the Shallow Bay portion of the Kepler Track and the Frazers Beach Reserve walkways.

A natural monument, in the form of Monument Hill, lies across the lake from the township. This sharply pointed landmark beneath the Hunter Mountains to the west on Manapouri township is a prized destination for adventurous trampers.

The Lake2Lake Trail is a cycle trail that starts at Te Anau and follows the Waiau River to Lake Manapouri. The trail is 28.5 kilometres long.

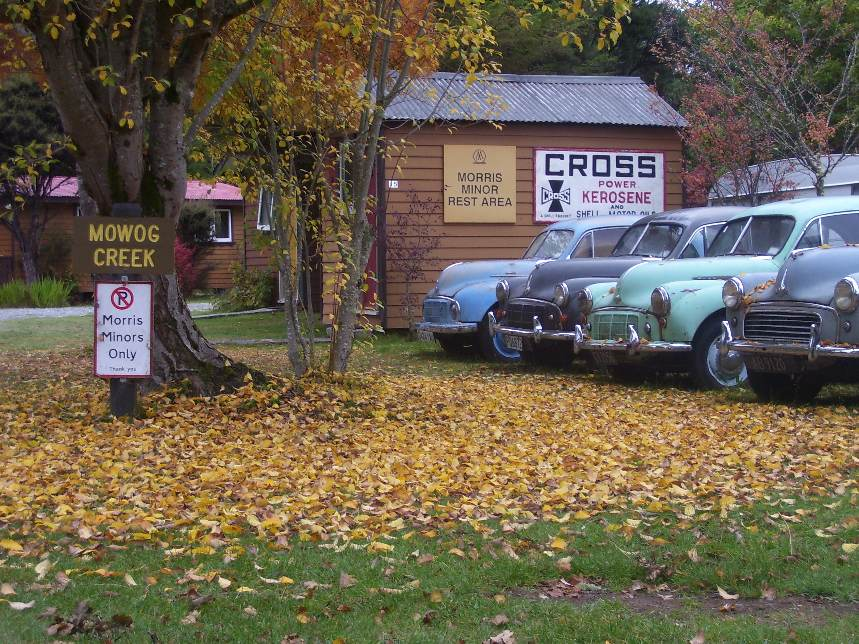
Manapouri Camping Ground in autumn

=== Kayaking ===
The eastern end of Lake Manapouri is open for kayak exploration, with 20 islands and many coves, beaches, lagoons, waterfalls, huts, portages and channels with in a day's return paddled from Manapouri township.

=== Lord of the Rings filming locations ===
Manapouri was a site of filming for Peter Jackson's The Lord of the Rings trilogy. During a late snowstorm one November, Manapouri Hall was used to film the scene in The Two Towers in which Frodo, Samwise and Gollum attempt to enter the black gates of Mordor. According to Jackson, the townspeople only asked for a small fee for the film crew to use the hall but the production gifted a large sum for the refurbishment of the hall and in acknowledgement of the town's generosity. The crew was not allowed to use large granite boulders located in the forest near Lake Manapouri and instead created artificial rocks, two of which were gifted to the townspeople. Other locations near the town were used for filming, including the Kepler Mire (for panning, aerial shots of the Dead Marshes and other swamps), Waiau River (for various shots of the River Anduin) and Norwest Lakes (for the iconic shot of the fellowship traversing mountain peaks). It is also rumoured that locations in the Fiordland National Park were used in The Ring of Power season one, as a film crew were spotted near Manapouri.

=== Wee Bookshop ===
Manapouri is home to the Wee Bookshop, made famous through Ruth Shaw’s memoir, The Bookseller at the End of the World. The bookshops were built in 2020 and originally sold titles about the local region and conservation. There are now three tiny bookshops - one for adults, a smaller one for children, and one for the blokes.

== Climate ==
Manapouri has an oceanic climate (Cfb) under the Köppen climate classification with mild summers and cool to cold winters. In a typical winter season, snowfalls and snow on the ground are likely on a handful of occasions.

Climate data for Manapouri (1991–2020 normals, extremes 1991-present)
Month	Jan	Feb	Mar	Apr	May	Jun	Jul	Aug	Sep	Oct	Nov	Dec	Year
Record high °C (°F)	32.0 (89.6)	30.7 (87.3)	28.8 (83.8)	23.8 (74.8)	21.3 (70.3)	18.2 (64.8)	16.1 (61.0)	18.1 (64.6)	22.3 (72.1)	24.0 (75.2)	26.4 (79.5)	29.2 (84.6)	32.0 (89.6)
Mean maximum °C (°F)	27.6 (81.7)	27.4 (81.3)	24.6 (76.3)	20.4 (68.7)	17.7 (63.9)	14.7 (58.5)	14.0 (57.2)	15.0 (59.0)	18.3 (64.9)	21.0 (69.8)	23.2 (73.8)	26.0 (78.8)	28.6 (83.5)
Mean daily maximum °C (°F)	20.7 (69.3)	20.5 (68.9)	18.4 (65.1)	15.0 (59.0)	11.8 (53.2)	8.7 (47.7)	8.3 (46.9)	10.3 (50.5)	12.9 (55.2)	14.8 (58.6)	16.7 (62.1)	19.2 (66.6)	14.8 (58.6)
Daily mean °C (°F)	14.7 (58.5)	14.4 (57.9)	12.3 (54.1)	9.6 (49.3)	7.2 (45.0)	4.5 (40.1)	4.0 (39.2)	5.3 (41.5)	7.5 (45.5)	9.3 (48.7)	10.9 (51.6)	13.3 (55.9)	9.4 (48.9)
Mean daily minimum °C (°F)	8.6 (47.5)	8.2 (46.8)	6.3 (43.3)	4.2 (39.6)	2.5 (36.5)	0.3 (32.5)	−0.4 (31.3)	0.4 (32.7)	2.2 (36.0)	3.8 (38.8)	5.2 (41.4)	7.4 (45.3)	4.1 (39.4)
Mean minimum °C (°F)	0.9 (33.6)	0.5 (32.9)	−1.3 (29.7)	−2.6 (27.3)	−3.5 (25.7)	−4.8 (23.4)	−5.5 (22.1)	−5.0 (23.0)	−4.1 (24.6)	−2.7 (27.1)	−1.7 (28.9)	0.2 (32.4)	−6.1 (21.0)
Record low °C (°F)	−3.6 (25.5)	−2.0 (28.4)	−5.5 (22.1)	−5.2 (22.6)	−5.9 (21.4)	−7.5 (18.5)	−10.2 (13.6)	−8.2 (17.2)	−5.9 (21.4)	−7.3 (18.9)	−3.7 (25.3)	−2.5 (27.5)	−10.2 (13.6)
Average rainfall mm (inches)	88.6 (3.49)	85.3 (3.36)	82.7 (3.26)	85.0 (3.35)	104.4 (4.11)	91.4 (3.60)	94.2 (3.71)	82.0 (3.23)	106.2 (4.18)	113.0 (4.45)	95.7 (3.77)	97.4 (3.83)	1,125.9 (44.34)
Average rainy days (≥ 1.0 mm)	9.5	8.0	9.6	10.2	12.3	11.9	11.7	10.9	12.0	12.7	10.5	11.0	130.3
Average relative humidity (%)	77.5	83.3	86.2	88.5	91.0	92.1	92.3	91.8	86.0	82.6	76.9	76.0	85.3
Source: NIWA Climate Data

Climate data for Manapouri (West Arm Jetty) (1991–2020 normals, extremes 1962-present)
Month	Jan	Feb	Mar	Apr	May	Jun	Jul	Aug	Sep	Oct	Nov	Dec	Year
Record high °C (°F)	31.6 (88.9)	31.1 (88.0)	28.1 (82.6)	21.4 (70.5)	16.6 (61.9)	18.7 (65.7)	18.7 (65.7)	15.9 (60.6)	19.8 (67.6)	23.2 (73.8)	27.5 (81.5)	29.4 (84.9)	31.6 (88.9)
Mean maximum °C (°F)	26.8 (80.2)	26.4 (79.5)	23.3 (73.9)	18 (64)	14.1 (57.4)	11.6 (52.9)	10.5 (50.9)	12.1 (53.8)	16.2 (61.2)	19.4 (66.9)	22.8 (73.0)	25.9 (78.6)	27.9 (82.2)
Mean daily maximum °C (°F)	19.4 (66.9)	19.1 (66.4)	16.8 (62.2)	13.2 (55.8)	9.7 (49.5)	6.7 (44.1)	6.0 (42.8)	7.9 (46.2)	11.0 (51.8)	13.2 (55.8)	15.4 (59.7)	17.9 (64.2)	13.0 (55.5)
Daily mean °C (°F)	14.5 (58.1)	14.2 (57.6)	12.3 (54.1)	9.6 (49.3)	6.9 (44.4)	4.2 (39.6)	3.4 (38.1)	4.9 (40.8)	7.2 (45.0)	8.9 (48.0)	10.8 (51.4)	13.1 (55.6)	9.2 (48.5)
Mean daily minimum °C (°F)	9.6 (49.3)	9.3 (48.7)	7.8 (46.0)	5.9 (42.6)	4.1 (39.4)	1.7 (35.1)	0.7 (33.3)	1.8 (35.2)	3.4 (38.1)	4.7 (40.5)	6.2 (43.2)	8.3 (46.9)	5.3 (41.5)
Mean minimum °C (°F)	4.1 (39.4)	3.8 (38.8)	2.5 (36.5)	0.2 (32.4)	−1.1 (30.0)	−2.6 (27.3)	−3.7 (25.3)	−2.6 (27.3)	−1.7 (28.9)	−0.8 (30.6)	0.9 (33.6)	2.8 (37.0)	−4.3 (24.3)
Record low °C (°F)	−1.1 (30.0)	−0.6 (30.9)	−0.7 (30.7)	−3.2 (26.2)	−4.4 (24.1)	−8.5 (16.7)	−7.9 (17.8)	−5.6 (21.9)	−3.4 (25.9)	−5.4 (22.3)	−3.1 (26.4)	−0.6 (30.9)	−8.5 (16.7)
Average rainfall mm (inches)	365.8 (14.40)	249.4 (9.82)	231.0 (9.09)	275.3 (10.84)	413.3 (16.27)	271.2 (10.68)	329.0 (12.95)	253.7 (9.99)	374.7 (14.75)	377.3 (14.85)	300.4 (11.83)	311.8 (12.28)	3,752.9 (147.75)
Source: NIWA

== Gallery ==
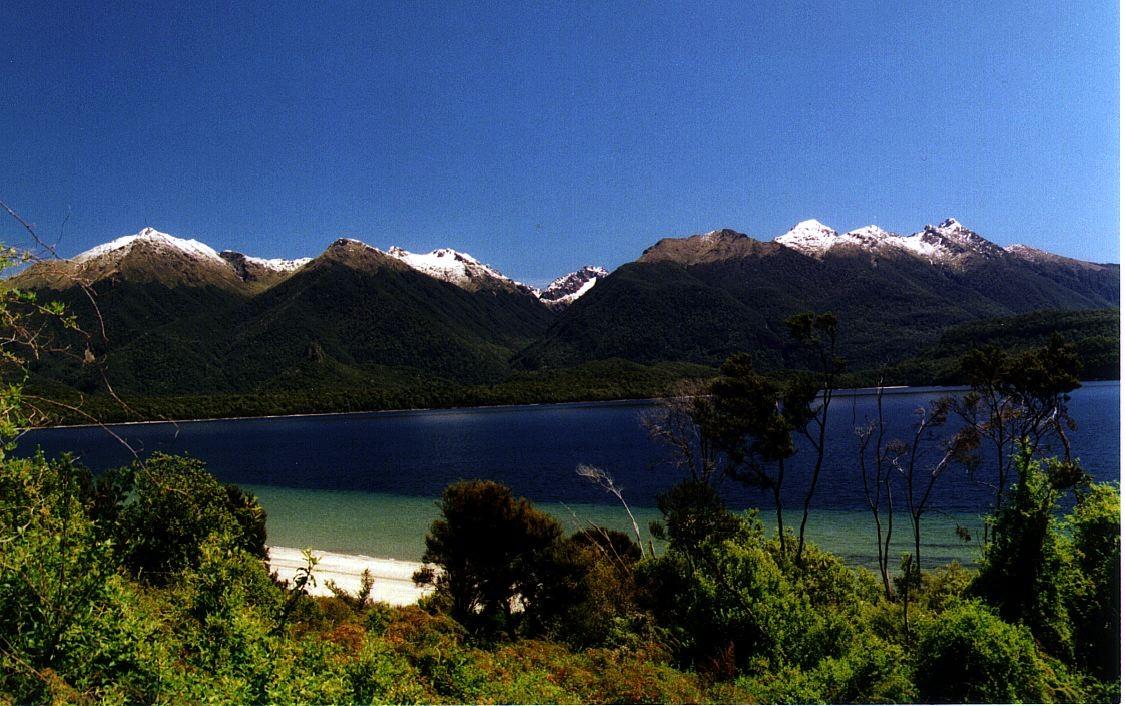
View from Frazers Beach Reserve

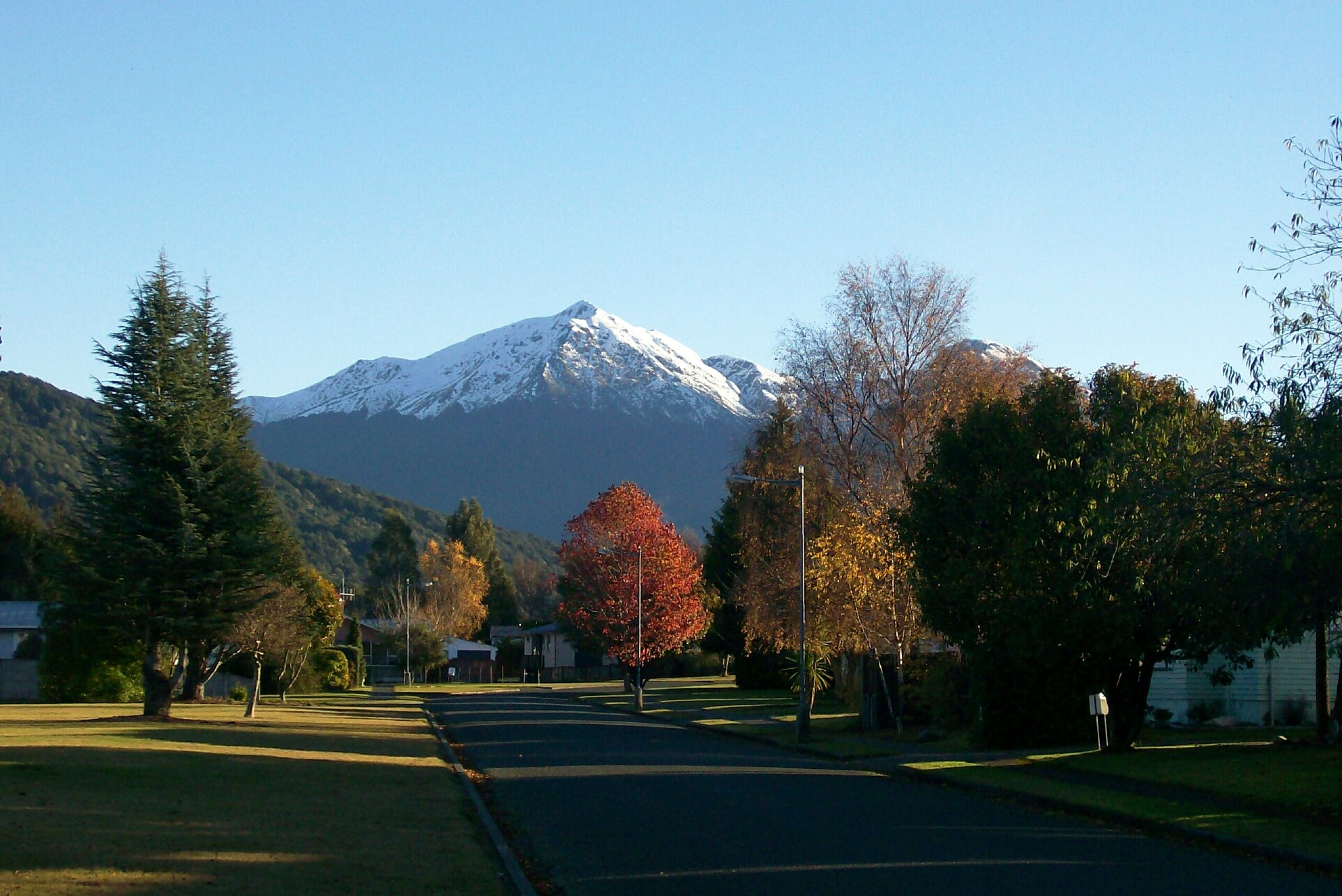
Autumn view along Mararoa Drive with snow-dusted Mount Moturau in the distance

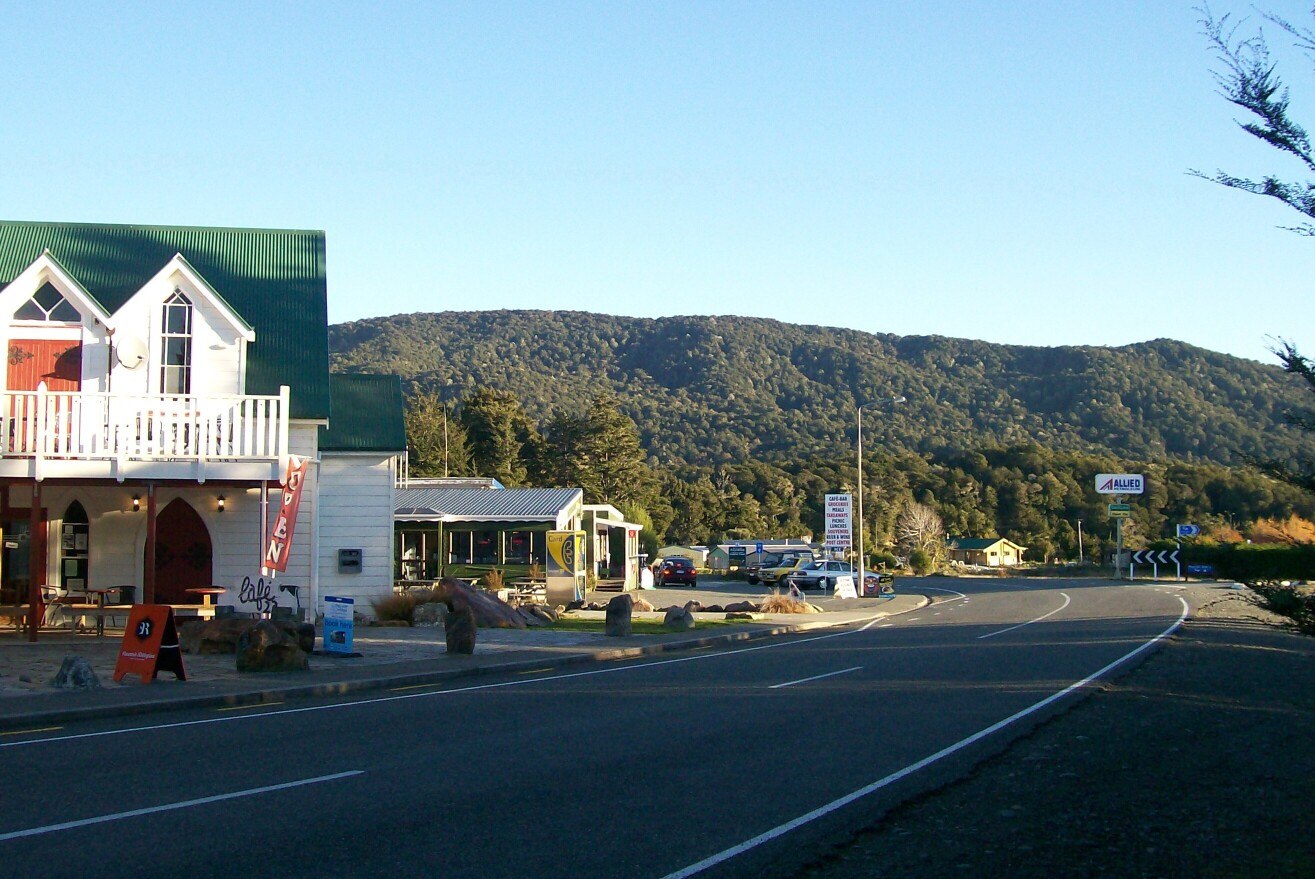
Manapouri commerce

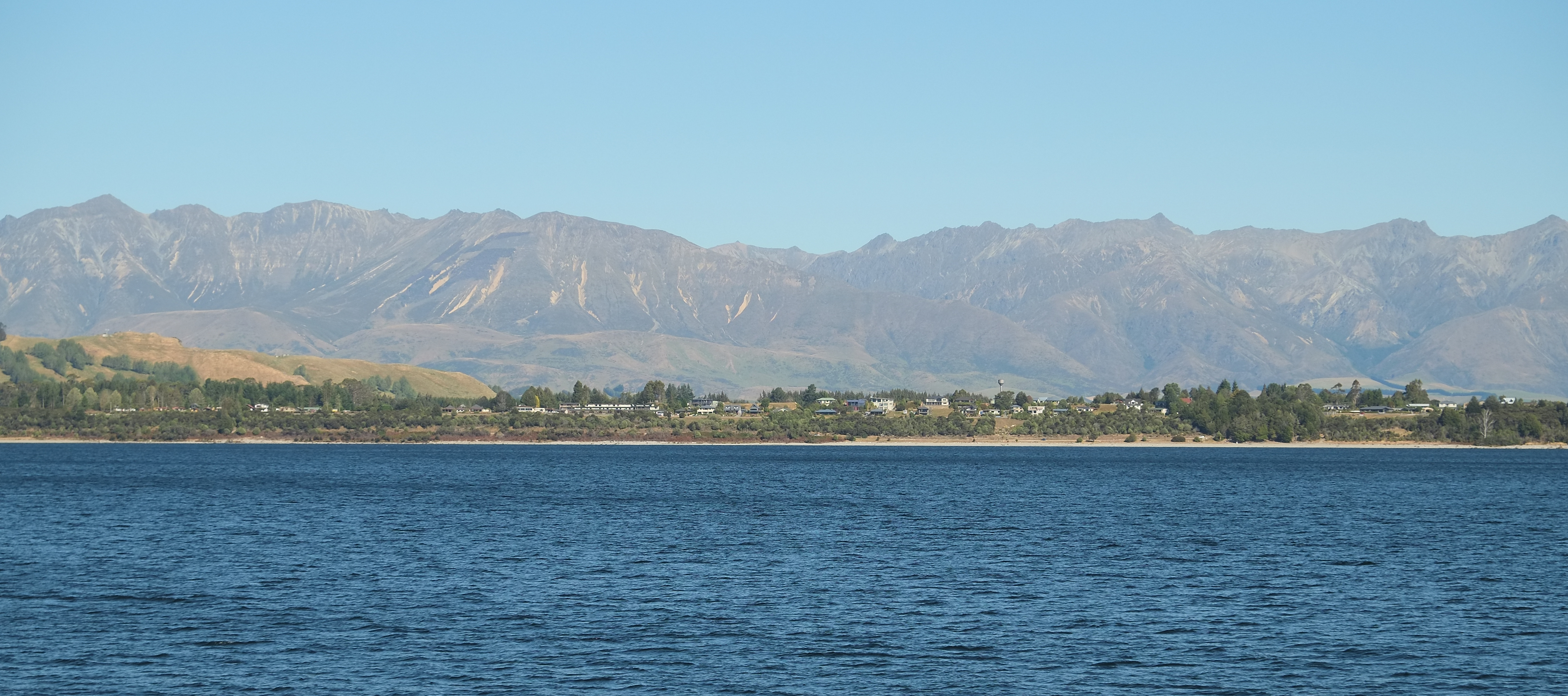
Manapouri township from Lake Manapouri
