= Save Manapouri campaign =

Environmental campaign in New Zealand

Save Manapouri
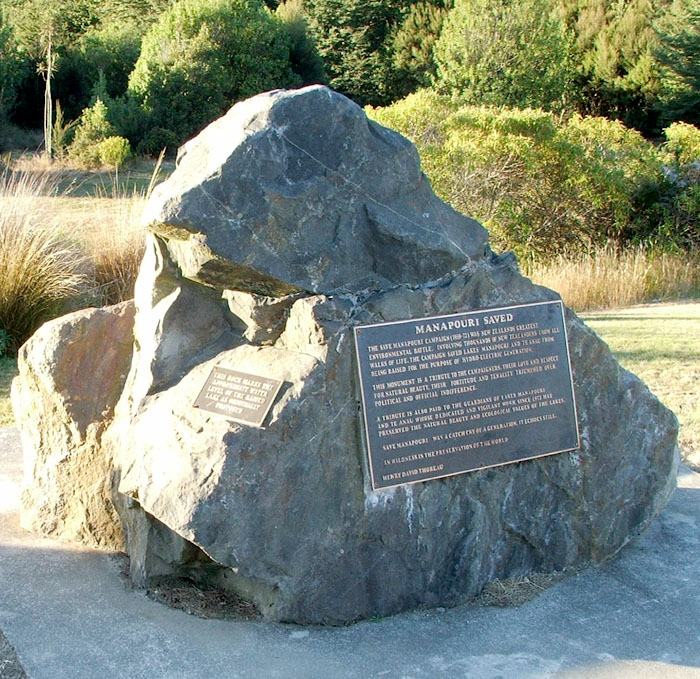
- Monument to the Save Manapouri campaign in Manapouri, New Zealand
- Formation: 1969; 57 years ago
- Dissolved: 1972; 54 years ago
- Location: Te Anau, New Zealand
- Origins: Environmental campaign to prevent the raising of the levels of lakes Manapouri and Te Anau

The Save Manapouri campaign was an environmental campaign waged between 1969 and 1972 in New Zealand to prevent the raising of the levels of lakes Manapouri and Te Anau as part of the construction of the Manapouri Power Project.

== Origins ==
In 1955 Harry Evans, a New Zealand geologist with Consolidated Zinc Proprietary Ltd, identified a 2.5 billion tonne deposit of bauxite in Australia on the west coast of Cape York Peninsula, near Weipa. It was largest deposit of bauxite that had ever been discovered. In 1956 The Commonwealth Aluminium Corporation Pty Ltd, later known as Comalco (now Rio Tinto), was formed to develop the bauxite deposits. The company started investigating sources of large quantities of cheap electricity needed to reduce the alumina recovered from the bauxite into aluminium. Comalco settled on Manapouri as that source of power and Bluff as the site of the smelter. The plan was to refine the bauxite to alumina in Queensland, ship the alumina to New Zealand for smelting into metal, then ship it away to market. Without public consultation, the Second Labour Government under Walter Nash signed a deal in January 1960 that would allow Comalco to build the dam, to construct a tunnel through the Southern Alps to Doubtful Sound where it could be harnessed to produce electricity. The deal included rights to the water for 99-years.

Also in 1960, entomologist Dr. John Salmon at Victoria University wrote Heritage Destroyed, advocating an end to hydropower projects that sacrificed the environmental values of the land they submerged. In the book, he stated "Today, without so much as an apology, we see these world-famous places filched from the people of New Zealand in acts of State-sponsored vandalism such as have never been witnessed before." His book helped to inspire the Save Manapouri Campaign, on the national committee of which he belonged.

For much of the rest of the decade, the lake was advocated for at a small scale by the Royal Forest and Bird Society and New Zealand Scenery Preservation Society. This included two petitions, in 1960 and 1963, which gained 25,000 and 1,127 signatures respectively, were largely ignored by the Second National Government under Keith Holyoake.

== The Campaign ==
The Save Manapouri Campaign was launched at a public meeting at Invercargill in October 1969. It later came to manifest the international awareness of the environment that came with the prosperity of the 1960s.

"At its simplest, the issue was about whether Lake Manapouri should be raised by as much as 30 metres. But there was much more at stake than that. There were strong economic and engineering arguments opposing lake raising, and there were also legal and democratic issues underlying the whole debate. What captured the public's imagination across the country was the prospect that a lake as beautiful as Manapouri could be interfered with, despoiled and debased", wrote Neville Peat.

In 1970, 264,907 New Zealanders, almost 10% of the population, signed the Save Manapouri petition. Nevertheless, the Cabinet Committee on Manapouri and the Manapouri Commission of Inquiry both concluded that the New Zealand Government was obligated under the terms of the Manapouri-Te Anau Development Act 1963 to raise the levels of Lakes Manapouri and Te Anau in order to guarantee the supply to Comalco (now Rio Tinto Aluminium) of electricity for the aluminium smelter based at Tiwai Point.

== Impacts ==
In the 1972 general election, Manapouri was a significant issue, and the Labour Government of Norman Kirk was elected on a platform that included a strong endorsement of the Save Manapouri ideals.

In 1973, Kirk honoured his party's election pledge. He created an independent body, the Guardians of Lake Manapouri, Monowai, and Te Anau to oversee management of the lake levels, which they do to this day. The original six Guardians were Alan Mark, Ronald McLean, Wilson Campbell, Les Hutchins, John Moore, and Jim McFarlane, and they were all prominent leaders of the Save Manapouri Campaign.

The single Damn the Dam recorded and released in 1973 by John Hanlon has retrospectively become associated with the Save Manapouri Campaign. Hanlon's song was originally an energy conservation jingle to advertise home insulation, with the proceeds from its release going to charities. However, since the release of this song followed on from the successful conclusion of the Save Manapouri Campaign, 'Damn the Dam' is now popularly recognised as an anthem in tribute to one of New Zealand's longest and hardest-fought environmental campaigns.

In 1991, the Save Manapouri Campaign was revived with many of the same leaders and renamed Power For Our Future. The campaign opposed selling off the power station, to ensure that Comalco did not revive its plans to raise Lake Manapouri's waters. The campaign was successful: the government announced that Manapouri would not be sold to Comalco.
