= Lake Manapouri =

Lake in Southland Region, New Zealand

- Manapōuri (Māori)
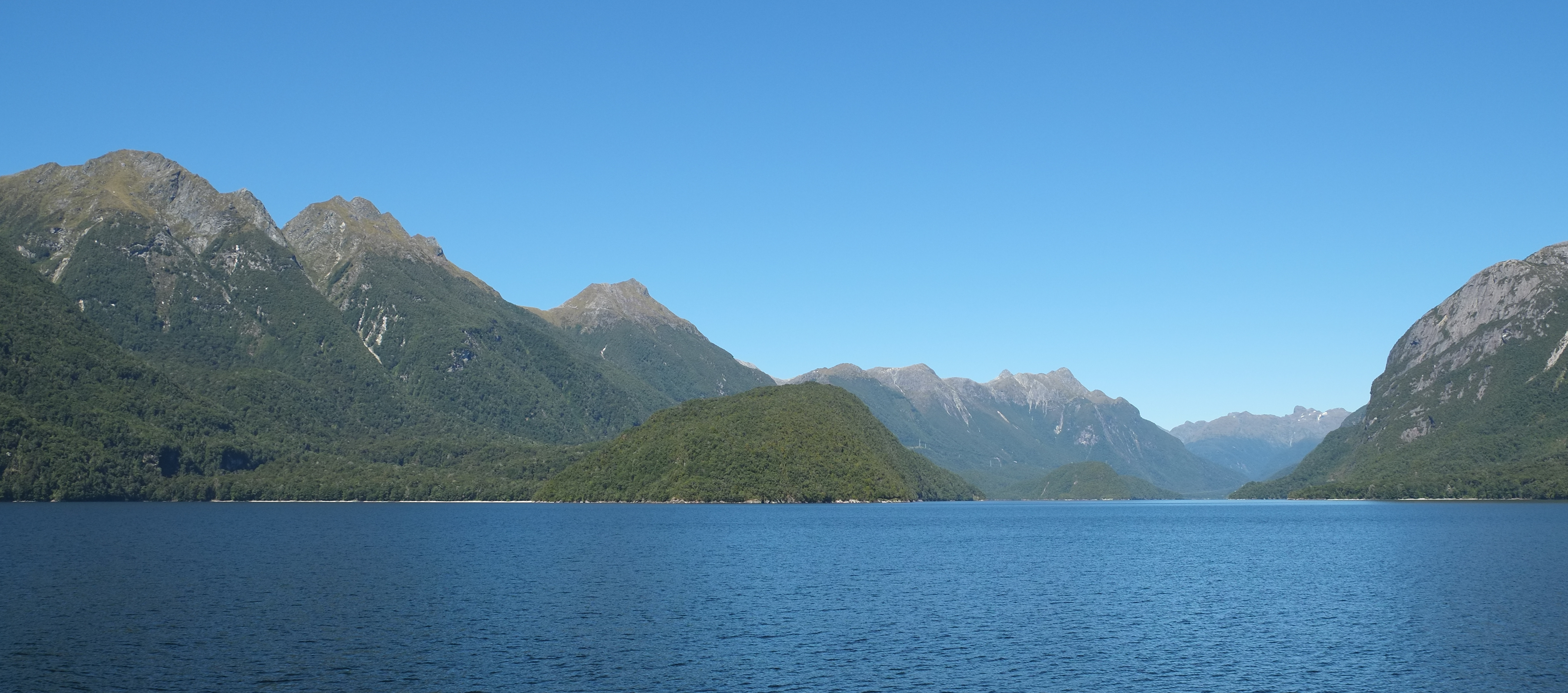
- Lake Manapouri towards Turret Range and West Arm

- Location within New Zealand Location within South Island
- Interactive map of Lake Manapouri
- Location: Southland District, Southland Region, South Island
- Coordinates: 45°30′S 167°30′E
- Primary inflows: Upper Waiau River
- Primary outflows: Waiau River
- Catchment area: 1,388 km^{2} (536 sq mi)
- Basin countries: New Zealand
- Max. length: 28 km (17 mi)
- Surface area: 142 km^{2} (55 sq mi)
- Average depth: 149 m (489 ft)
- Max. depth: 444 m (1,457 ft)
- Water volume: 21.16 km^{3} (5.08 cu mi)
- Shore length^{1}: 170 km (110 mi)
- Surface elevation: 177.8 m (583 ft)
- Islands: 33
- Settlements: Manapouri
- ^{1} Shore length is not a well-defined measure.

Lake Manapouri (Māori: Manapōuri) is located in the South Island of New Zealand. The lake is situated within the Fiordland National Park and the wider region of Te Wahipounamu South West New Zealand World Heritage Area.

== Māori History ==
According to Māori legend Lake Manapouri was created by the tears of two sisters, Moturua and Koronae, who were daughters of an old chief in the region. Koronae journeyed deep into the forest one day only to become stranded after a fall. Her sister Moturua went looking for her and when she found Koronae she realised that Koronae could not be rescued. Moturua lay with Koronae and there they lay until they died, their tears creating Lake Manapouri. Lake Manapouri means anxious or sorrowful heart because of the grief of the two sisters. However, the present name was given by mistake. An early settler accidentally called it by the name of one of the Mavora Lakes, which lie between Lake Te Anau and Lake Wakatipu. The original name of the lake is believed to have been Roto-ua which translates to Rainy Lake and later Moturau which means Many Islands. Māori have a long history in the area, finding the lake and its surroundings offering an abundance of food in the form of eels and birds such as pigeon and kākā (forest parrot). Manapouri was discovered by Europeans in 1852 by the explorers Charles J Nairn and W H Stevens.

== Geography ==
Lake Manapouri was formed by glaciers during the last Holocene. The lake is New Zealand’s second deepest lake measuring 444 metres (1,457 ft) deep. Lake Manapouri is 178 metres (584 ft) above sea level however due to glaciers, Lake Manapouri has been cut deep into the ground and the bottom of the lake now lies 267 metres (876 ft) below sea level. The lake has four arms, North, South, West and Hope with the smaller indentations of Shallow Bay and Calm Bay. Lake Manapouri contains 33 islands in total with 22 of these being wooded. Lying close to the centre of the lake is the largest island of Pomona Island. Other large islands include Holmwood Island, Rona Island and Mahara Island. The small settlement of Manapouri lies on the eastern shore.

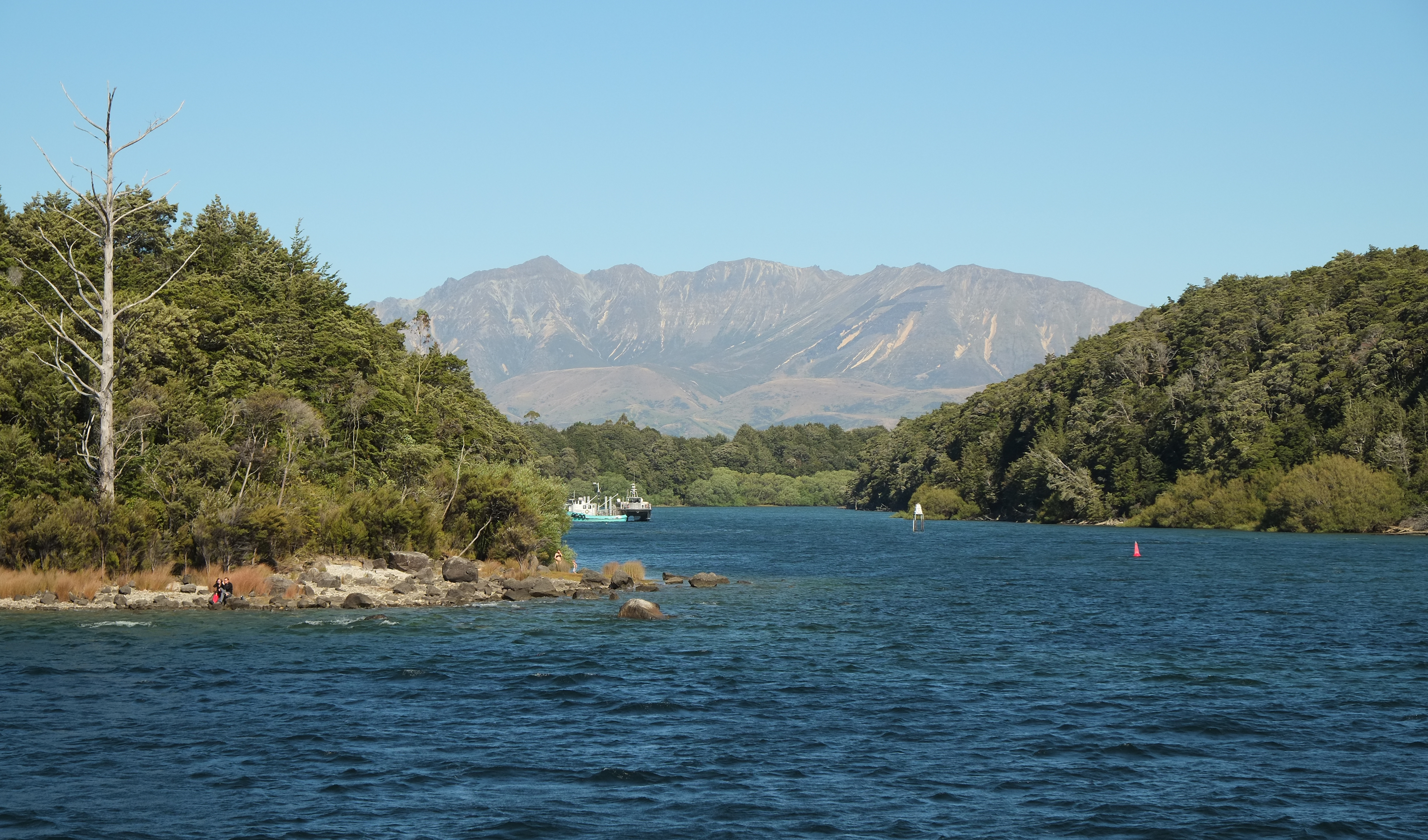
Outlet into Waiau River

The Waiau River (Southland) is both a natural inlet and outlet for the lake, flowing into the northeast of the lake from Lake Te Anau, 20 kilometres (12 mi) to the north and flowing out from Manapouri's south-eastern end. The outlet however has been diverted due to the development of Manapōuri Hydroelectric Power Station. Water now flows unnaturally westward to the sea at Deep Cove. Rainfall in the area is high, however due to the mountains in the west rainfall is much higher in this area. The average rainfall for the western arm of Lake Manapouri is 3,786 millimetres (149.1 in) annually, while Manapouri Township on the eastern arm of the lake receives less than a third at 1,143 millimetres (45.0 in) annually. Lake Manapouri drains a large catchment area of 1,388 square kilometres (536 sq mi). This includes the slopes of the Kepler Mountains, Turret Range and Hunter Mountains which surround all but the eastern shore of the lake. Water levels in the lake are predominantly high during spring due to snow melt and low in winter.

Lake Manapouri is often described as New Zealand’s most beautiful lake.

== Biodiversity ==
The area is well known for its fishing and high water quality. Both Lake Manapouri and Lake Te Anau lie within the ultra-oligotrophic index on the trophic state index with clear highly oxygenated waters of very low biological productivity. Both lakes along with the connecting Waiau River contain the New Zealand longfin eel and introduced brown trout and rainbow trout as well as some Atlantic salmon. The area is however free from macrophyte Lagarosiphon major an exotic and invasive species which has infiltrated many other New Zealand lakes.

Lake Manapouri provides 73% of New Zealand’s longfin eel lake habitat protected from commercial fishing. However the lake has experienced a decline in numbers of longfin eels due to the construction of the hydro- electric dam blocking eel migration. The outflow passage is blocked by the hydro-electric dam which means that eels can be killed when passing through the turbines. A vertical slot fish pass was installed in 1999 and trap and transfer of elvers (young eels) was started in summer 1998/1999. Since the trap and transfer operation commenced in 1998/99 more than 407,000 elvers have been transferred upstream of the Maraoa Control structure. Catch totals in the trap and transfer system can vary in correspondence to surface water temperatures falling below 15 °C (288 K). The trap and transfer technique was successful in improving fish distribution however operations had to be stopped in 2004 due to the concerns that transferring elvers to upstream habitats would spread the exotic invasive algae Didymosphenia geminata. The operation now transfers elvers just past the dam due to these concerns. There is concerns also that the trap and transfer operation does not trap enough silvers eels (eels of breeding age) with an average of 200-400 annually. This however equates to only one silver eel per hectare within the lake which is much lower than standards recommended overseas. More research is needed to understand if trap and transfer is the best option in Lake Manapouri.

Submerged vegetation within Lake Manapouri is mostly native species. Lake Manapouri has a high diversity of submerged vegetation. The rare Hydatella inconspicua an endemic shallow water plant was found in many of the Fiordland lakes including Lake Manapouri in 1998, this was the first reporting of it being in the South Island. The finding meant that the plant was no longer considered endangered.

== Surroundings ==
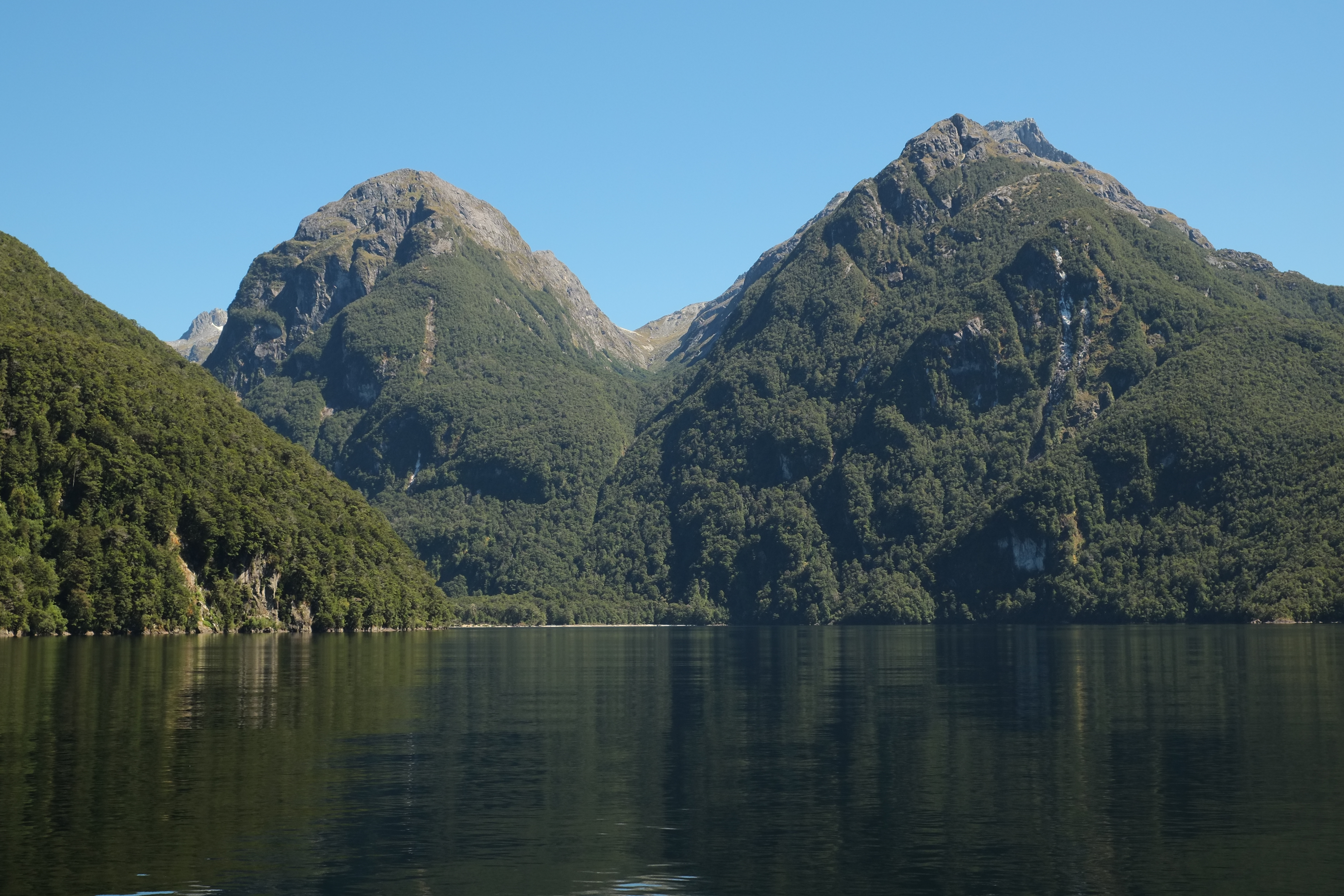
North Arm of Lake Manapouri

The shoreline in the North and West of the lake remains substantially unaltered since deglaciation. Beaches have formed on the lake where rivers bring sediment to areas where the near shore relief is not too steep allowing pocket beaches to form. The beaches around the lake show many similarities to ocean shores. The shape of the lake funnels wind and waves down the long axis which leads to longshore transport or littoral drift of sediment and size selective sorting. There are however a number of differences to ocean shores. The short fetch length produces a narrow range of wave conditions and this low energy limits the size of sediment in transport. Large changes to the beach profile are induced by fluctuations in lake level, major fluctuations can drown beaches. The beaches on the lake develop a distinctive shelf profile whereby beach sediments grade lakeward into fine sand. The outer edge of the shelf is marked by a shelf break and a transition to organic-rich muds on a steep offshore slope. There are a number of different types of beaches including pavement beaches, gravel, mixed sand and gravel beaches and sand beaches.

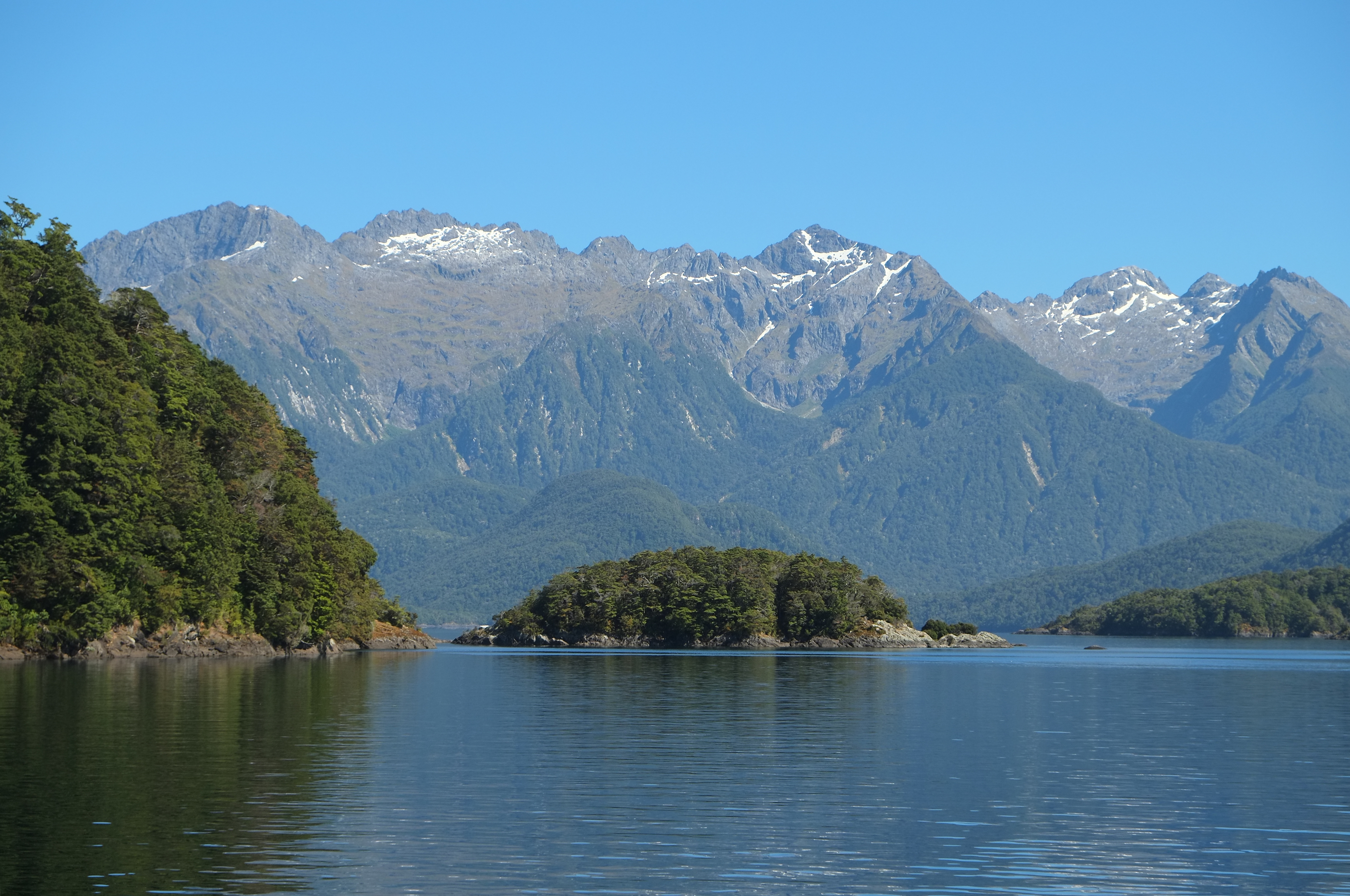
View past Mahara Island towards Cathedral Peaks

The islands around Lake Manapouri are of varying size and isolation. Many of the islands contain virtually unmodified vegetation. However, there is large diversity between islands in habitat biodiversity, with some islands being completely devoid of plants and soil and other rich in both. There is confusion as to some differences with some researchers finding that the area of an island plays a role in species richness with others find no correlation at all. Red deer have greatly modified much of Fiordlands' vegetation however only the two largest islands within Lake Manapouri contain introduced red deer while other islands are only occasionally visited by deer. The smaller islands around Lake Manapouri are extremely unusual as they contain natural vegetation which has not been harmed by red deer, as the red deer have not been able to reach the islands. On these islands palatable plants as well as deep moss mat on the forest floor persist under the dense understory layers of the forest. The Australian brush-tail possum (Trichosurus vulpecula) is not present on the islands.

== Hydro-power from the lake ==
The lake provides hydro-electric power via the Manapōuri Hydroelectric Power Station, in the West Arm, which discharges water through two 10 kilometres (6.2 mi) tailrace tunnels to the sea at Deep Cove in Doubtful Sound. In 1959 Consolidated Zinc, with the support of the New Zealand government, planned to raise the lake by up to 30 metres (98 ft) for an increase in power generation for the development of an aluminium smelter. This resulted in a strong nationwide protest, the Save Manapouri campaign, lasting over a decade, which prevented the raising of the lake from taking place. The Save Manapouri campaign is regarded as a major milestone in the history of New Zealand's environmental protection. As a result of the campaign, lake levels were required to be maintained at close to natural levels. The win also saw the establishment in 1973 of the Guardians of Lake Manapouri and Te Anau.

The water pumped through the station is discharged into Doubtful Sound, accounting for 41 percent of the fresh water consumed in New Zealand in 2010. In 2002, the Government — under pressure from the environmental movement — rejected an application of a business, Southland Water 2000, to bottle 40,000 cubic metres of water in 20 hours, twelve times a year, before the water from the power station is released into Doubtful Sound.

== Integrated management of the lake ==
The environmental movement of Save Manapouri campaign is considered to be the first environmental movement in New Zealand. When this movement won the campaign to stop levels on the lake being raised, the government formed the Guardians of Lake Manapouri and Te Anau. This meant that main campaigners during the Save Manapouri campaign were appointed to advise the managers of the hydro-electric power plant on the management of both Lake Manapouri and Lake Te Anau. This holistic management between nature conservation and hydro-electric development was unprecedented in New Zealand.

The group was to “report and make recommendations of Government… on any matter arising from the environmental, ecological and social effects of the construction and operation of the Manapouri-Te Anau electric power scheme on the townships of Manapouri and Te Anau, the lakes and shorelines of Te Anau and Manapouri, and the rivers flowing in and out of these lakes with particular reference to the effects of lake levels on scenic values, conservation, recreation, tourism and other related activities and amenities”. The guardians were entitled to reports from the Government on actions that had been taken that were deemed relevant so they could fulfil their jobs.

Defining the natural variation of lake levels was considered very important. The lake had already experienced slumping due to a lowered lake level. Also the forest that surrounded the lake was reliant on a variation of water levels. Shoreline beech forest extended almost 3m below the highest natural lake level. The roots of this forest could be submerged for a maximum of 50 days meaning that lake levels needed to be maintained within a range that did not exceed this maximum. The raising of the lake levels too high also had the potential to submerge low-lying islands, many of which contained natural vegetation unharmed by red deer.

Lake management guidelines were devised from geomorphological and ecological studies correlated with a 37-year lake level record. The concepts of High, Main and Low Operating Ranges were developed as a basis for management guidelines. The guidelines were verified in practice and incorporated into legislation in 1981. In 1987 the groundings for the Resource Management Act 1991 were being laid. The Government decided that all empowering legislation for hydro-electric stations should be re-issued. For Lake Manapouri this meant a public process was established whereby a working party was formed to examine and resolve a wide range of environmental issues. Lake management guidelines and shoreline monitoring were formalised under resource consents. Also included in the consents was the creation of regulation patterns through the Te Anau and Manapouri control structures to follow more closely to the natural fluctuations of the Waiau River. The resource consent set up legislation which could restore biological and recreational values to the lower river, particularly the section immediately below the dam. Compensation was also granted for a range of adverse environmental effects associated with the diverting of water through the power station.

The Guardians of the Lake were given legal status in the 1990 amendment to the Conservation Act 1987 with additional and similar responsibility for Lake Monowai. The guardians are still active in 2012 and working alongside Meridian Energy, the current owner of the Lake Manapouri Hydroelectric Power Station.

== See also ==
- List of lakes in New Zealand
- Lakes of New Zealand
- Department of Conservation (New Zealand)
- Save Manapouri campaign
