= Walker River (New Zealand) =

River in Southland, New Zealand

- Route of the Walker River
- Mouth of the Walker River Walker River (New Zealand) (South Island) Walker River (New Zealand) (New Zealand)

Location
- Country: New Zealand

Physical characteristics
- Source
  - coordinates: 45°47′17″S 167°24′55″E
- Mouth
  - location: Lake Monowai
  - coordinates: 45°50′24″S 167°29′16″E
  - elevation: 180 m (590 ft)

Basin features
- Progression: Walker River → Lake Monowai → Monowai River → Waiau River → Foveaux Strait

The Walker River, New Zealand is a river in Southland, New Zealand. It rises near Cleughearn Peak and flows eastward into Lake Monowai.

== See also ==
- List of rivers of New Zealand
