= Monowai Power Station =

Hydroelectric power station in New Zealand

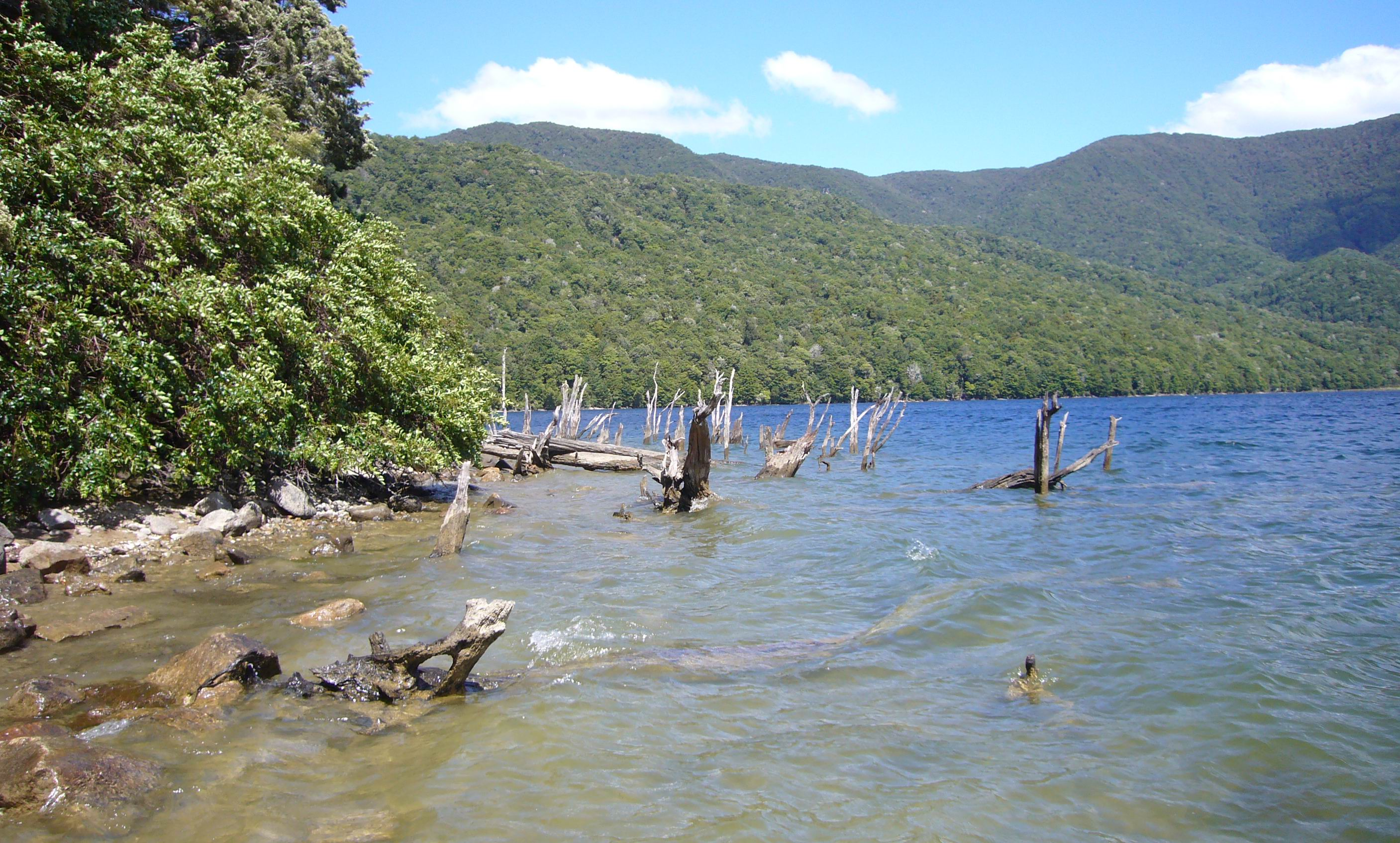
- Stumps from dead trees that were drowned when the lake level was raised in the 1920s

- Location within New Zealand
- Country: New Zealand
- Location: Southland
- Coordinates: 45°48′42.1″S 167°31′20.6″E
- Purpose: Power
- Status: Operational
- Construction began: 1920
- Opening date: 1925
- Owners: Southland Electric Power Board (1920-1936); Southland Electrical Power Supply (1936-1993); The Power Company (1993-1999); Trustpower (1999-2002); Pioneer Energy (2002-present day)
- Operator: Pioneer Energy

Dam and spillways
- Type of dam: Earth
- Impounds: Monowai River

Reservoir
- Creates: Lake Monowai
- Surface area: 31 km^{2} (12 sq mi)
- Normal elevation: 180 m (590 ft)

Monowai Power Station
- Coordinates: 45°46′32.5″S 167°36′59.7″E
- Operator: Pioneer Energy
- Type: Conventional
- Hydraulic head: 154 ft (47 m)
- Turbines: Three
- Installed capacity: 7.6 MW (10,200 hp)
- Annual generation: 40 GWh (140 TJ)
- Website; Pioneer Energy website

The Monowai Power Station, fed by the Monowai River from Lake Monowai in Southland, New Zealand, was one of the earliest hydroelectric power stations in the country. Originally commissioned in 1925, it was refurbished between 2005 and 2007 and now contains modern turbines and plant, though the original buildings are still in use.

Before its refurbishment, the station produced 6.3 megawatts (8,400 hp) and 35–40 gigawatt-hours (130–140 TJ) of electricity per year. Generating capacity has now increased to 7.6 MW.

== Location ==
The power station is located approximately 50 kilometres from the town of Tuatapere in Southland. The power station is accessed from Turbine Drive, which can be reached from Blackmount-Redcliff Road via Lake Monowai Road.

== History ==
=== Development ===
The first considerations for a Monowai hydropower plant were raised as early as 1910, when the Invercargill Borough Council aware of the success of Dunedin's Waipori hydro-electric scheme had employed consulting engineer G. Symington to investigate the best means of providing more power to the borough. In his report submitted in March 1910 he had identified that while Monowai would provide the cheapest power its distance from Invercargill (which would require the building of lengthy transmission lines) coupled with the demand meant it would be more feasible for the borough to continue using its existing coal powered power station.

In 1914 a group of leading Southland businessmen and politicians established the Southland Progress League to promote and encourage growth in the region. One of the ten committees formed, focused on the potential and development of the region's natural resources. The League was granted access in 1916 to Symington's report, and other than requesting the government in July 1916 to investigate electricity generation options in Southland little was achieved and by March 1917 the league was in debt and consideration was being given to it being disbanded. In 1916, Frederick Kissel, an engineer in the Public Works Department reported to his manager in the department that Monowai was still an unrealistic option unless there was increased demand in the form of metallurgical or chemical manufacturing was developed in the Southland. The election of Alexander Rodger (1872 – ?) as the league president re-galvanized the league and saw it clear its debt. In 1917 the government in response to the league's request dispatched engineer Lawrence Birk (1874–1924) from the Public Work Department on the first of two visits (20 to 28 September and 1 to 8 December) to investigate the demand for electricity and potential for hydro-electric generation in Southland.

There was enthusiastic response in Southland to Birk's report, which resulted in the League receiving additional financial support. This allowed them to directly engage Gisborne consulting engineer F. C. Hay to investigate in more detail the best source of generation, the expected cost and how to reticulate the resulting electricity throughout Southland. Hay's identification of Monowai with its sizable fall from Lake Monowai into the Waiau River as the best source of hydro-electric generation and his estimation of costs was endorsed by the Public Works Department. Hay estimated that it would take three years to complete the power station as well as the transmission system, once authority was given to proceed.

At the same time the League believing that for Southland to progress, electricity needed to be made available throughout the province and not just to the major population centres. The League, taking the initiative, wrote the legislation for the Electric Power Boards Act of 1918. This legislation gave the Power Boards the right to produce, reticulate and sell power to areas that the Government did not supply. As a result of the legislation the Southland Electric Power Board (SEPB) was established and in December 1919 elected its first board members.

On 5 February 1920 the newly established SEPB formally adopted Hay's proposed Monowai design and it was agreed that the board request ratepayer permission to raise a loan of £1,500,000 to cover both the building of the power scheme and the distribution of electricity throughout the power boards district.

A poll of ratepayers in the board's district on 27 March 1920 approved obtaining the loan. Until the loan was obtained SEPB would temporarily fund its activities using a bank overdraft with the collateral being the ability to rate people in the district. Sir Joseph Ward who was soon to be visiting Britain on other business was asked to broker the loan. The New Zealand government subsequently agreed to guarantee SEPB's existing loan and to finance its activities until it could secure an overseas loan.

After unsuccessfully trying to employ either Lawrence Birk or Evan Parry as their engineer SEPB engaged the newly established Wellington firm of Hay and Vickerman (which consisted of F.C. Hay and Hugh Vickerman (1880–1960) and John Gill Lancaster (1983 - 1950) in partnership to undertake all engineering surveys, undertake all civil engineering design and construction, with Hay and Vickerman subcontracting the electrical design to Brown and Forsdick of Auckland. All of the designs were to be approved by the Public Works Department. Hay and Vickerman's fee was 2% to undertake the design with an additional 1% to be paid for supervising the construction.

The approved design called for building an earth dam with control gates to raise the lake level. The outflow would follow the river bed until at a weir it would be diverted into wooden pipelines to convey it to an 8,000 hp capacity powerhouse located by the confluence of the Monowai and Waiau Rivers.

=== Construction commences ===
It was estimated that 5,000 tons of material would need to be transported to Monowai. from the nearest railhead which was at Tuatapere on the Tuatapere branch railway. Investigations were undertaken into how best to do this, with consideration given to trucks, horse-pulled carts, traction engine as well as transporting it up the Waiau River which would require some blasting to remove hazards. The decision was made to employ a traction engine and two trucks which required SEPB to upgrade the existing roads and also extend them to the construction site. Until the road was completed material was brought in by horses pulling wagons. In 1920 Alfred Pryde Walker (1891–1953) was appointed the resident engineer in charge of construction. Walker had experience as an engineer in Canada, South Africa, Ceylon, Fiji and Australia (where he had worked with Hay). By the end of 1920 a total of 80 men and 40 horses were working in the project, building the road and preparing the sites for the construction camp and powerhouse. A Boving water wheel was established on site to provide power to the construction camp, but it was switched off at 10:00 pm. A timber mill was established on Diggers Hill on the Western side of the Waiau River to provided timber for the project. By early 1921 not only was the access road to Lake Monowai completed but also the construction camp as well as a new suspension bridge across the Waiau River at Sunnyside. Up until the completion of the bridge material and men had been conveyed across the river by a ferry.

After the Wallace Country complained about the impact of the increased vehicle traffic on its roads over the winter SEPB began using teams of horses pulling wagons instead of the traction engine and trucks over the winter months.

=== Recession ===
In 1921 there was a world-wide economic slump made worse by the termination of the commandeer system (which resulted in a dramatic fall in the export prices of meat, wool and dairy products), caused the New Zealand government to look at means of reducing public and private expenditure. As a result, they were no longer prepared to guarantee to fund SEPB. In compliance with the government directives to reduce expenditure Lawrence Birks who was by now Chief Engineer of the Hydro-Electric Branch of the Public Works Department wrote to SEPB on 19 April 1921 that with expenditure of £100,000 to date and contracts in place for another £100,000 they had to reduce capital expenditure in order to ensure that the supply and reticulation become profitable as easily as possible. Therefore, while he wanted Monowai to be completed it was necessary to reducing the area that was to be supplied and to change the system of charging consumers in order to reduce the total cost to £600,000. In response, Hay and Vickerman were requested by SEPB to provide a detailed estimate for a modified scheme costing £600,000. In June 1921 they replied with an estimate of £700,000 which lead the board to instruct Sir Joseph Ward who was then in London to arrange a load for £750,000.

With no money or credit or government approval the board of SEPB decided to cancel the contracts for the purchase of poles and insulators. As they had not been satisfied with the performance of Hay and Vickerman, they also decided to dispense with their services. Among the reasons were the absence of both Hay and Vickerman during the early stage of the work, their estimates were proving to be too low, progress was slow on upgrading the roads to allow their use in winter, materials were being purchased before they were required and at high prices. The cancellation of the contract would eventually lead to arbitration, which resulted in SEPB having to pay the firm 2% of the capital costs. While five staff members of Hay and Vickerman's staff were employed by SEPD, 112 men working at Monowai were let go. Ward meanwhile in July 1921 managed to obtain a loan for £750,000 at an interest rate of 6%, which would be guaranteed by the New Zealand Government.

With no engineer, SEPB approached Evan Parry who had left the Public Works Department in 1919. Despite a lucrative salary offer he turned it down. SEPB was eventually able to obtain the services of Herbert P. Thomas, who in January 1922 took up the position, which was now as an employee of SEPB. In the interim G.F. Ferguson who had been taken on from Hay and Vickerman was acting engineer.

=== Work restarts ===
Once he had taken up his duties Thomas reviewed the scheme and identified that the average flows from Lake Monowai would be less than had been originally been estimated. Taking into accounts what had been built to date he adopted the ideas of Alfred Walker and proposed that to construct a short dam to divert to the Monowai River through control gates, then a second longer earth dam would be built to raise the lake level by an additional 8 ft compared with the previous scheme. The water would flow through the control gates to a headpond where a weir would divert it into a canal to carry the water to a shortened steel pipeline. He also proposed to install only one 4 MW generator and later a 2 MW unit. He also proposed modifying the transmission system. His design was adopted by the SEPB board. With the change to a steel pipeline, the one million of heart totara that had been cut and milled in preparation for making the previous pipeline design was used for lining houses at Monowai and the rest sold.

Work recommenced at Monowai in early 1922 with Thomas estimating that the station would be generating power by September 1923. Soon the workforce on site had risen to 800, working three shifts a day. To build the control gates, from the terminus of a road that had been built along the northern side of the Monowai River a raised trestle tramway was built southwards across the lakes natural outlet to convey construction materials and the workforce to the arm of the lake where the control gates were built. Once they had been finished the area under the trestle tramway was lined with timber to hold back the water as the area was filled with earth. the core of the dam was formed from two rows of steel-shod piles driven seven feet into the rock. These were surrounded by clay in bags and then sheathed in totara timber. The remaining fill consisted of unreinforced concrete, broken up rock, sand, and silt. The lake side surface of the dam was faced with rip-rap (ungraded pit gravel) which was later plant with willows to control the impact of waves on the dam. Later the downstream face was sown with clover and grass.

Gravel was sourced from an area close to the site of the new surge chamber and also mixed there to create concrete. By early 1923 the dam and control gates were completed. As the dam was formed the lake level rose and found a new outlet through the control gates, through which the water flowed before rejoining the original river bed. Work commenced on digging the canal using a wood-fired steam shovel and drag line hired from the Public Works Department. The dug out material that was not laid alongside the canal to form stopbanks was conveyed away by horse pulled carts.

At the terminus of the canal work commenced on the forebay structure where the water was to be directed into a single pipeline. By June 1923 the steel needed for the pipeline was arriving on site and being rolled on site by the Dunedin Engineering and Steel Company using horse pulled rollers. The roiled plates were then dripped in a boiling pitch and tar to protect them then riveted in 6 ft (1.8 m) long sections before being transported to required location for mounting on a cradle. Progress had reached the point by this time that SEPS placed orders for the turbines, valves, generators, exciters and switchgear. Due to poor economic conditions the total cost of £19,859 was well under what the quotations they had received two years earlier. The equipment suppliers were Boving, turbines and valves, English Electric, generators and exciters; Reyrolle, switchgear.

In early 1924 heavy rainfall caused the Waiau River to rise 12 ft (3.7 m) and flood the foundations for the powerhouse. As a result, it was decided to redesign the foundations so that it was of the "tank" top with allowed the river could rise 5 ft (1.5 m) above the floor level without interfering with the power station's operation. The flooding also caused damage to the approaches to the bridge over the Waiau which allowed the river to scour around the bridge's pillars. As a result, extensive remedial work was required. the only upside of the heavy rainfall was that Lake Monowai rose 9.5 ft (2.9 m) which confirmed that the dam and control gates were up to the task. A car was driven the length of the pipeline once it was completed. However once the pipeline was filled with water for the first time it was found to be deflecting by up to 7 in (180 mm), which caused some of its supporting cradles to crack. The issue was fixed by installing additional cradles. When the surge chamber was filled with water for the first time it was found to leak badly, but Alfred Walker solved the problem in the short term by putting oatmeal in the water which swelled up and sealed the cracks. By 15 December 1924 the powerhouse and head works were completed, the turbines were running and the generators were drying out and the switchgear cabled, leaving only minor work required.

=== Enters service ===
By March 1925 the power station was in service, running continuously and via a double 66 kV circuit transmission line supplying Winton and from there on a supply was available through to Invercargill and Gore at 11 kV. With construction work completed Alfred Walker was appointed Station Superintendent with a total of 13 permanent staff serving at Monowai. To assist Walker in his duties he was sent to Coleridge to receive a months training in power station operation

The station was officially opened on 1 May 1925 with two machines. Within 12 months the demand had reached the capacity of the existing machines. As a result, at the end of 1926, a third machine was ordered £3,580 from Boving. At the same time, a separate order for excitor turbine governors for the two existing machines was placed on Boving. By August 1927 the penstock and foundation of the third machine were completed with it commissioned later that year and in full service by February 1928. Present at the opening were the acting Prime Minister Gordon Coates, local members of parliament, the mayor of Invercargill and mayors of various Southland towns, as well as members of the Southland Power Board and representatives from other New Zealand power boards. The power station cost NZ$562,000.

=== Operation from 1927 to 1993 ===
By 1934 the SEPB was running short of electricity with an increasing number of dairy farms beginning to use vacuum pumps which placed considerable pressure on the network at peak times. In response it was proposed that capacity at Monowai be increased to 11 MW but the Government was not interested in lending money to SEPB for the upgrade, so the proposal lapsed.

In 1936 when the Government took over the SEPB and renamed it the Southland Electrical Power Supply (SEPS) the power station was included in the assets that they acquired.

In 1937 the canal between Lake Monowai and the headpond was deepened. The completion of a 110 kV transmission line in 1938 from Halfway Bush to Gore meant that Monowai powered system was connected to the national grid and hence to the Waitaki and Lake Power Stations.

During the Second World War the Monowai power scheme was regarded as being of strategic value, which meant that a blackout was applied to the powerhouse and village, with sentries at the bridge and nighttime patrols of the pipeline and canal. In 1942 the power station was shut down for a short period so that the pipeline could be emptied and its interior re-tarred. At the same time some additional cradles were installed to support the penstock at the bend while other cradles were repaired or replaced. In December 1948 the hostel at Monowai village burnt down, with a replacement opening in 1951. The generator winding began giving problems and were repaired in 1954, 1957 and 1958. In 1958 following damage from cavitation the runners of the turbines were repaired. In 1955 a fire briefly closed the power station.

In 1955 an 11 kV transmission line direct from Monowai to Te Anau was commissioned. In 1962 this was upgraded to 33 kV and in 1966 to 66 kV.

In 1956 cracks in the runner of the turbine on machine No.1 were repaired at Roxburgh power station.

In 1959 the spillway flash boards were removed. In 1961 the concrete lining the lake outlet and the canal were sealed, while at the same time the forebay and canal were cleared of sand. To improve its appearance dead trees were removed from the lake near the outlet in the 1960s. In 1986 an automatic screen-cleaning system was installed at the forebay. In 1988 the original 6.6 kV switchboard (including its slate control panels) was replaced.

In 1991 a new control system was installed at the control gates at Lake Monowai, which allowed them to be controlled from the control room in the powerhouse.

=== Proposed development ===
In the mid-1990s with much of the original equipment reaching the end of its physical and economic life the consulting firm of Royds Garden was engaged to investigate the various options available to upgrade and develop Monowai. In June 1996 they identified 10 possible options for consideration. SEPS decided to proceed with a scheme that involved diverting water from the river upstream of the existing headpond through a short canal and longer pipeline to the powerhouse. This would increase the head and thus water pressure so allowing the station for the same inflow to produce up to 50% more electricity per annum. In July 1997 a resource consent was applied for and subsequently granted.

=== Selling of Monowai ===
In 1993 upon the passing of the Southland Electricity Act Monowai together with all other assets of SEPS was vested in The Power Company Limited (TPCL).

The passing into law in August 1998 of the Electricity Industry Reform Act, which required the separation of ownership of generation and retailing from lines businesses. As part of its submissions when the new law was being proposed TPCL had requested that the limit on generation that line companies be allowed to own be increased from 3 MW to 10 MW. The government did increase the limit but only to 5 MW, which was lower than Monowai's capacity. As a result, TPCL had no choice but to reluctantly sell the power station, which they did in March 1999 to Trustpower for $3.75 million. Trustpower decided only to upgrade the turbines and generators and the resource consent to construct a canal and new pipeline was allowed to lapse.

Trustpower subsequently sold Monowai for a profit of $2.7 million to Pioneer Generation (subsequently renamed Pioneer Energy) in December 2002.

=== Refurbishment ===
At the time they purchased the power station Pioneer knew that while it had been well maintained the equipment was old and becoming unreliable, with a considerable number of unplanned outages. With no remote control facility operating staff had to attend the power station seven days a week, which by this time was only during daylight hours. If a fault occurred outside of hours of attendance it was necessary that for an operator to be called out to restore generation. This could take some time as the operating staff lived in the township of Manapouri, which is approximately 40 minutes drive from the station. if the problem was more serious than an operator could resolve then Pioneer was reliant on maintenance contractors who were generally based in Invercargill, who took a minimum of two hours to reach the site.

Various plans were considered, including a replacement of the three systems with a vertical 2.6-megawatt (3,500 hp) turbine and another larger vertical 5.3-megawatt (7,100 hp) turbine, allowing better accommodation of the changing river flows. This idea, however, failed, as well as later plans to use a single generator with one turbine at either end, partly because of the difficult access to the station, leading over a single-lane suspension bridge which imposed weight and size restrictions.

It was therefore decided in 2004 to go for a simple replacement of all three systems with new vertical turbines and associated generators, one each in 2005, 2006 and 2007. The work was undertaken by Invercargill firm Alltec Engineering Limited and the station now operates with three Swedish TURAB 2,566 kW vertical Francis turbines coupled to Spanish Alconza 3,183 kVA synchronous generators.

At the same time, the original riveted pipelines were replaced by 1.6m diameter welded steel pipelines. The new equipment has increased the power to 2.6 MW from each of the turbines, operating at 94% efficiency. Maintenance requirements have dropped significantly with the new equipment.

While most of the old equipment was scrapped the third turbine and generator as well as the generator of the second machine were found to be salvageable and were purchased by Clearwater Hydro of Tauranga. Once refurbished one unit was put into service in August 2011 at Speedys Rd, a small hydro-electric station near Waitomo in the Waikato.

=== Strengthening of the dam ===
Since 2003 the dam had begun showing signs of distress during earthquake events in the Fiordland area. Subsequent investigations revealed issues with the construction methods and the timber which had been used to strengthen the dam core. This timber was now rotten. As a result, in 2012 in order to reinforce the dam and improve general security, a downstream shoulder was added, the freeboard increased and the upstream face covered in rip rap to manage the impact of waves.

== Design ==
The power station has a head of 154 ft (47 m).

The Monowai Dam is a low earth embankment built across the Monowai River forming the 31 square km Lake Monowai. In an arm of the lake, about 8.5 km from the powerhouse, four control gates control the lake level. Water flows from the gates down the Monowai River for some 8 km to a headpond area formed by a weir across the river. From here it is diverted via a 43 ch (870 m) long canal to a forebay. The concrete reinforced forebay has a gravel trap and a sluice gate which allows it to be cleared without having to drain the canal. Provision was made in the structure for a second pipeline but it has never been built.

From the forebay a 53 ch (1,100 m) long 8.74 ft (2.66 m) diameter steel pipeline (raised above ground level on concrete cradles) leads to a surge tank. The base of the 24 ft (7.3 m) diameter surge tank is constructed of reinforced concrete rising 10 ft (3.0 m) above ground before continuing in steel to a height of 64 ft (20 m). Three penstocks 200 ft (61 m) long take the water from the surge chamber down a one in 10 gradient to directly connect to Francis turbines coupled to synchronous generators in the powerhouse, which is located on the west bank of the Waiau River. The 6.6 kV output from the generator connect via switchgear to two transformers, which transform it to 66 kV for transmission.

The outside of the powerhouse foundation raises above the generator floor to form a tank so that the Waiau River into which the station discharges can rise 5 ft (1.5 m) above the floor level before generation has to stop.

== Operation ==
The power station is subject to 18 resource consents which cover its ongoing operation and maintenance. They control the take, use and discharge of water for power generation, while maintaining minimum flows in all of the existing waterways. The resource consents are valid for 30 more years of operation.

== See also ==
- List of power stations in New Zealand
