= Tannock =

Tannock is a surname, and may refer to:

- Charles Tannock, British politician and psychiatrist
- Colin Tannock (1891–1972), Scottish-born Australian politician
- David Tannock (1873–1952), New Zealand horticulturist
- James Tannock (1784–1863), Scottish portrait painter
- Peter Tannock (born 1940), Australian rules football administrator
- Ross Tannock (born 1971), Scottish footballer
