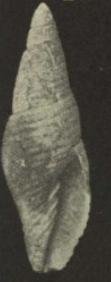
- Shell of Vexillum elatior (holotype)

Scientific classification
- Kingdom: Animalia
- Phylum: Mollusca
- Class: Gastropoda
- Subclass: Caenogastropoda
- Order: Neogastropoda
- Superfamily: Turbinelloidea
- Family: Costellariidae
- Genus: Vexillum
- Species: †V. elatior

Binomial name
- †Vexillum elatior (Finlay, 1924)

Synonyms
- † Costellaria elatior (Finlay, 1924); † Mitra elatior Finlay, 1924

= Vexillum elatior =

Extinct species of gastropod

Vexillum elatior is an extinct species of sea snail, a marine gastropod mollusk, in the family Costellariidae, the ribbed miters.

== Description ==
The length of the shell attains 19 mm, its diameter 6 mm.

(Original description) The shell is in form and sculpture so close to † Vexillum eusulcatum (Finlay, 1924) that it is best described by comparison with it. The protoconch is narrower and higher and apparently has an extra whorl. The first whorl contains 5 spirals, increasing later to 6 and then 7 on penultimate whorl. The body whorl shows about 20 unequal spirals. The interstices vary from one-half to one-third of ribs in width on periphery, but almost as wide as ribs on base. The ribs as in † Vexillum eusulcatum. The shells are not worn, and interstices are finely punctate, due to presence of axial threads which do not appear on ribs. Thus it is probable that well-preserved specimens of V. eusulcatum would show punctation also.The shell is noticeably narrower than in that species and more elongate, shape being narrowly fusiform rather than biconic. The whorls are also much more loosely coiled, the tightly-wrapped appearance of V. eusulcatum being absent. The body whorl has no blunt angulation, but is very lowly convex and then contracted to beak much lower down than in the other species. The presence of the perfectly straight supra-peripheral area in V. eusulcatum makes the spire-area almost a plane surface, hardly interrupted by sutures, but in V. elatior convexity of whorls makes sutures appear distinctly incised, although outlines of the spire remain straight. The spire is also considerably higher than the aperture. Internally, the columella bears 5 plaits instead of 4, the uppermost being much the strongest and somewhat removed from the others. Very young shells bear 4 narrow but high plaits (the highest remaining farther away) instead of 3 stout ones. The outer lip is quite different inside, being strongly lirate with about 9 very narrow but rather high ridges, many times their width apart.

== Distribution ==
Fossils of this marine species were found in Clifden, Southland, New Zealand.
