= Amy Hutchinson =

Amy Hutchinson may refer to:

- Amy Hutchinson (weaver) (1874–1971), New Zealand school hostel matron, spinner, weaver and community leader
- Amy Hutchinson (reformer) (1888–1985), New Zealand maternity reformer
