= John Laughton =

John Laughton may refer to:

- John Laughton (missionary) (1891–1965), New Zealand missionary
- John Knox Laughton (1830–1915), English naval historian
