= Mangahao Power Station =

Hydroelectric power station near Shannon, New Zealand

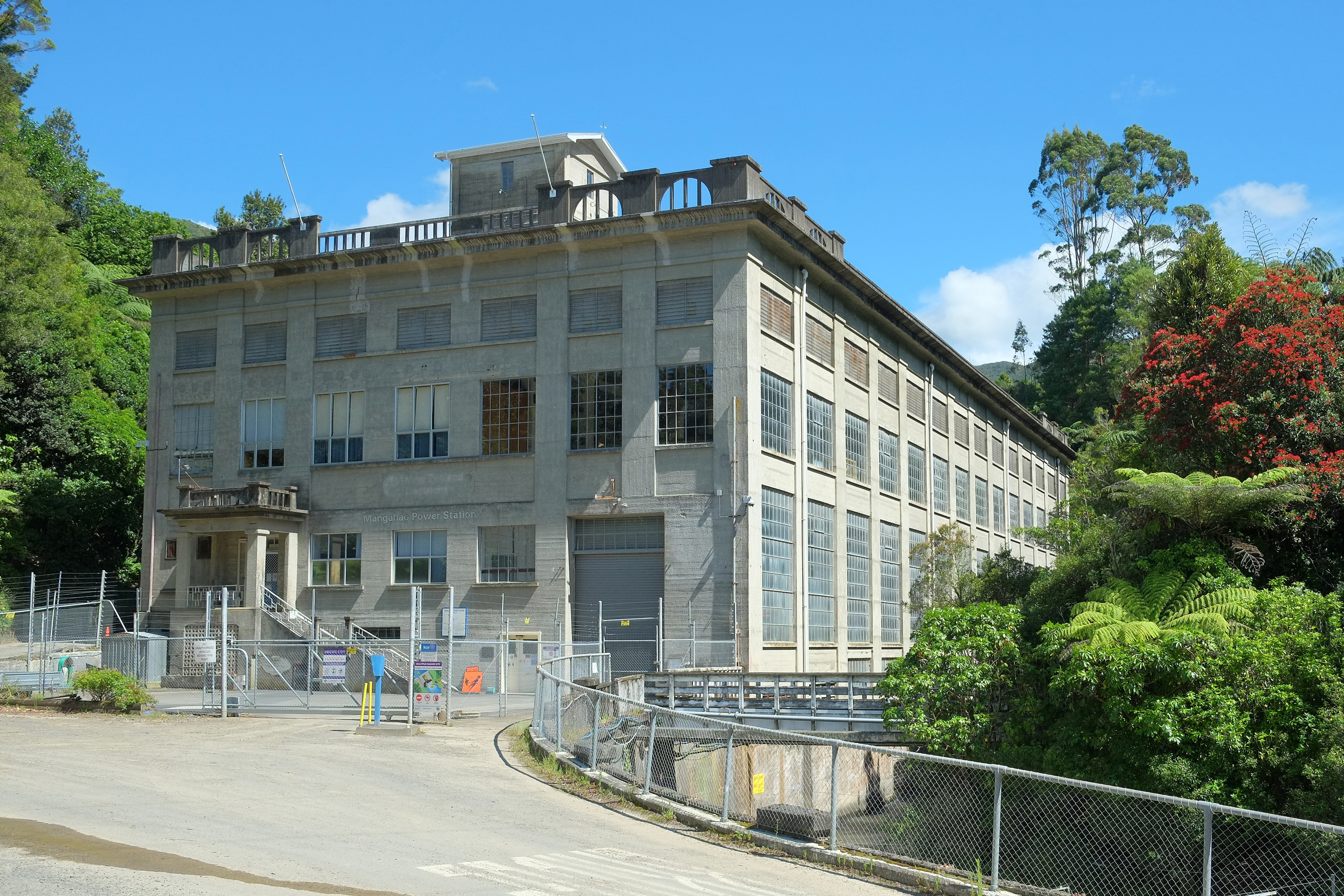
- Mangahao Power Station in 2022
- Country: New Zealand
- Location: Manawatū-Whanganui
- Coordinates: 40°34′36″S 175°27′1″E
- Status: Operational
- Construction began: 1919
- Commission date: November 1924
- Owners: Trustpower, King Country Energy

Thermal power station
- Primary fuel: Hydroelectric

Power generation
- Units operational: 3 (1 x Francis, 2 x Pelton)
- Nameplate capacity: 38 MW (51,000 hp)

Heritage New Zealand – Category 2
- Designated: 5 September 1985
- Reference no.: 4066

External links
- Commons: Related media on Commons

Mangahao Power Station is a hydroelectric power station near the town of Shannon, New Zealand. After being delayed by war, access road construction and foundation testing was started by late 1919 and the station opened in November 1924. It makes use of the Mangahao River, through a series of tunnels and pipelines totalling 4.8 kilometers in the Tararua Ranges. It is jointly owned and operated by Todd Energy and King Country Energy.

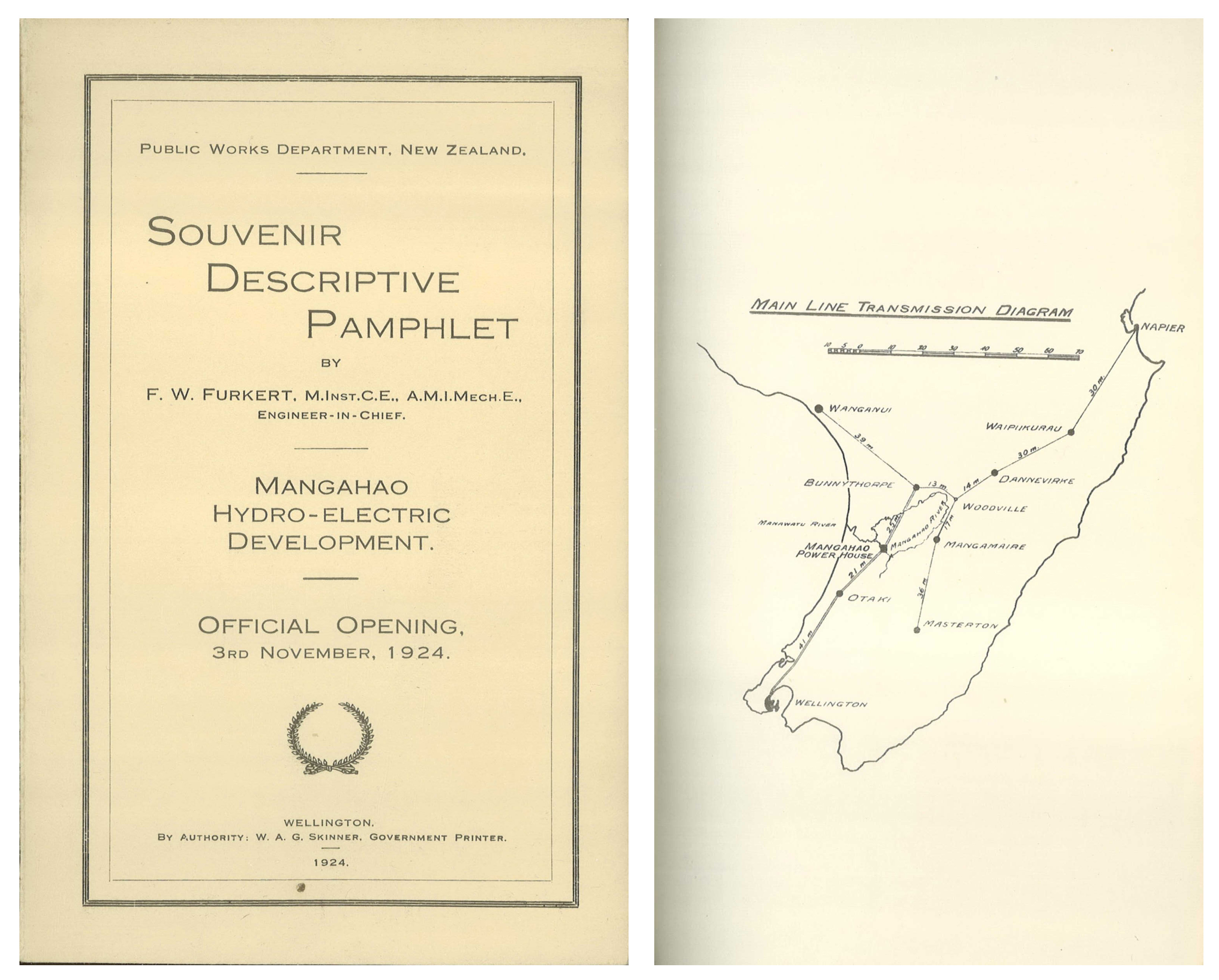
Mangahao Hydro Electric Power Station opening (3 November 1924)

== History ==
When commissioned, Mangahao Power Station had cost £1,493,456, caused the deaths of 8 tunnellers from carbon monoxide poisoning, an explosion and crushing, and was the main power station serving the lower North Island, with transmission lines connecting Mangahao with Wellington, Palmerston North, Whanganui, Masterton, Napier and Hastings. The power station was connected through to the Waikaremoana hydro scheme in 1929 and through to Arapuni Dam in 1934, forming the basis of the North Island transmission grid.

Mangahao was officially opened by the Prime Minister, William Massey, on 3 November 1924. It was one of his last public duties before he died. Supply expanded as transmission equipment was built:

- 3 November 1924: 3 mi (4.8 km) 11 kV line to Shannon to supply the Horowhenua Power Board, replacing a steam plant.
- 19 December 1924: Mangahao-Bunnythorpe 110 kV west line, temporarily operating at 11 kV, to supply Manawatu-Oroua Power Board and Palmerston North Borough Council.
- 24 December 1924 (full supply 10 March 1925): Mangahao-Khandallah 110 kV east and west lines, Khandallah substation, and Khandallah-Petone 11kV line to supply Hutt Valley Power Board.
- 26 March 1925: Supply from Khandallah substation to Wellington City Council for testing. Their Evans Bay steam plant assisted with peak-reduction and supplied some power back to Khandallah substation.
- March 1925: Mangahao-Bunnythorpe 110 kV east line and Bunnythorpe substation, giving full supply to Manawatu-Oroua Power Board.
- 6 April 1925: Bunnythorpe-Woodville 110 kV line and Woodville switching station.
- 7 April 1925: Woodville-Mangamaire 110 kV line and Mangamaire substation to supply the Tararua Power Board
- 17 May 1925: Mangamaire-Masterton 110 kV line and Masterton substation to supply the Wairarapa Power Board
- 19 May 1925: Woodville-Dannevirke line 110kV line and Dannevirke substation to supply the Dannevirke Power Board
- 26 August 1925: Khandallah-Ngauranga 11 kV line to supply the Wellington Meat Export Company.
- 14 September 1925: Dannevirke-Waipukurau 110 kV line and Waipukurau substation to supply the Central Hawke's Bay Power Board
- 23 April 1926: Bunnythorpe-Wanganui 110 kV line and Wanganui substation to supply the Wanganui-Rangitikei Power Board
- 8 April 1927: Waipukurau-Napier 110kV line and Napier substation to supply the Hawke's Bay Power Board.

The scheme was first considered by Peter Seton Hay and developed by Frederick Kissel. Earthquake strengthening was done in 1983 and 2015. In 2004 the original two smaller generating sets were replaced by a 26 MW (35,000 hp) Francis turbine unit and, with upgrades, the station capacity is now 38 MW (51,000 hp).
