= Tuatapere =

Town in Southland, New Zealand

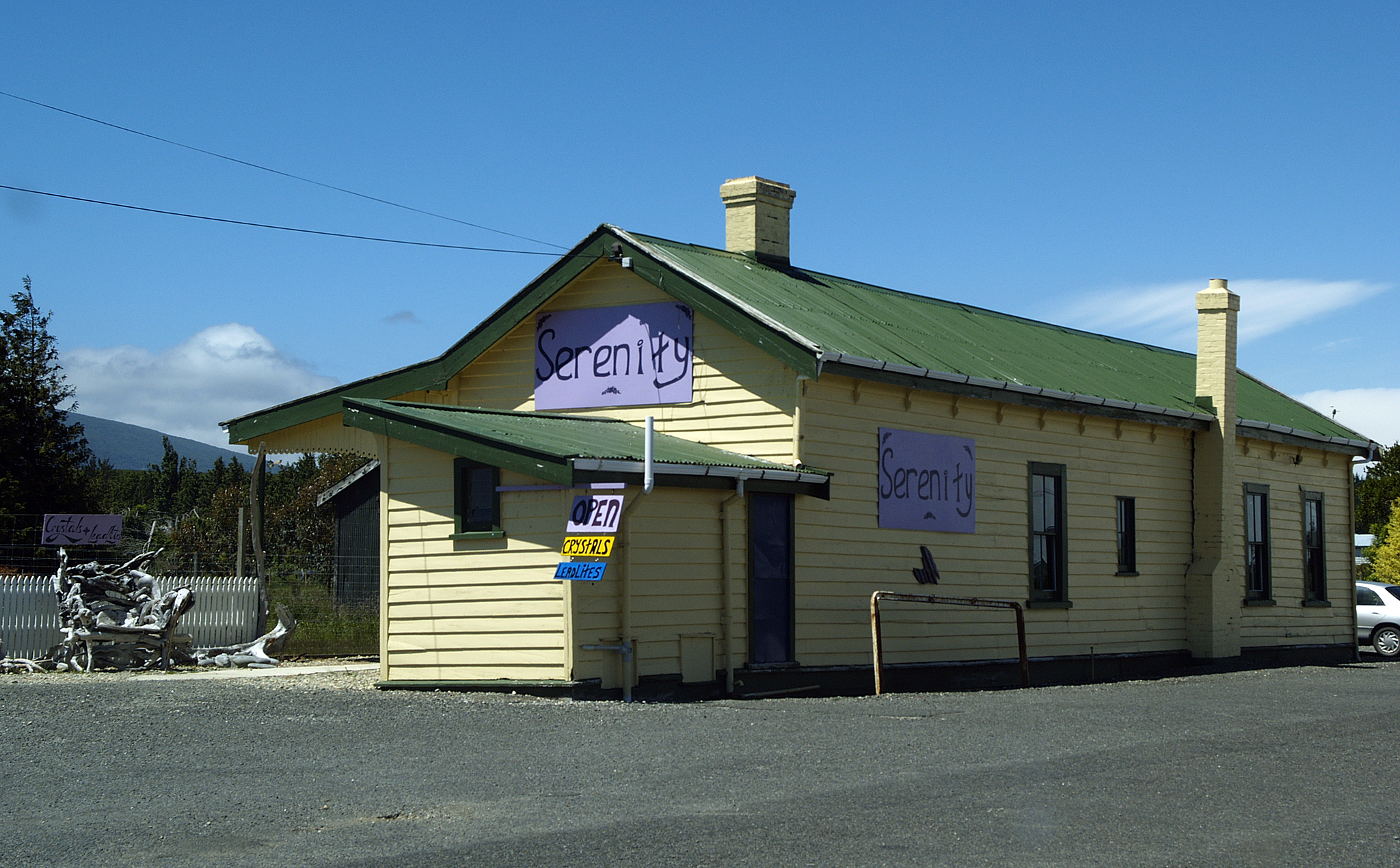
- Old Railway Station
- Interactive map of Tuatapere
- Coordinates: 46°08′0″S 167°41′0″E
- Country: New Zealand
- Island: South Island
- Region: Southland region
- Territorial authorities of New Zealand: Southland District
- Ward: Waiau Aparima Ward
- Community: Tuatapere Te Waewae Community
- Electorates: Invercargill; Te Tai Tonga (Māori)

Government
  - Territorial authority: Southland District Council
  - Regional council: Southland Regional Council
  - Mayor of Southland: Rob Scott
  - Invercargill MP: Penny Simmonds
  - Te Tai Tonga MP: Tākuta Ferris

Area
  - Total: 2.00 km^{2} (0.77 sq mi)
- Elevation: 30 m (98 ft)

Population (June 2025)
  - Total: 560
  - Density: 280/km^{2} (730/sq mi)
- Time zone: NZST
- Postal code: 9620
- Local iwi: Ngāi Tahu
- Website: onnaturesedge.co.nz

Tuatapere is a small rural town in Southland, New Zealand. It is the self-declared "Sausage Capital of New Zealand". Tuatapere is located eight kilometres from the southern coast. The Waiau River flows through the town before reaching Te Waewae Bay, where it has its outflow into Foveaux Strait. The main local industries are forestry and farming.

Tuatapere has a logging museum and is located on the Southern Scenic Route from Invercargill to Te Anau making it a well-travelled tourist stop. The Clifden Suspension Bridge and Clifden War Memorial are located near State Highway 99 outside Tuatapere.

== History ==
=== First European settlers ===
A group of Hungarians settled in Tuatapere, but were assimilated into the general population by the mid 20th century.

=== Railway ===
On 1 October 1909, a branch line railway from Invercargill was opened to Tuatapere and it became known as the Tuatapere Branch. On 20 October 1925, an extension was opened to Orawia, 14 kilometres to the north-east, but the line continued to be known as the Tuatapere Branch and an engine depot was established in the town. It was used as the base for most operations on the line and the branch was operated as essentially two sections, one from Invercargill to Tuatapere and one from Tuatapere to Orawia. Until 1968, steam locomotives ran all trains to Tuatapere, but in June 1968, the line was dieselised, resulting in the closure of the Tuatapere engine depot. On 1 October 1970, a lack of traffic meant the line was truncated to Tuatapere, and it was further cut on 30 July 1976 when the section between Riverton and Tuatapere closed. Some relics from the railway have been preserved in Tuatapere, including structures in the station area such as the old station building and goods shed.

== 2009 Fiordland earthquake ==
Tuatapere was one of the closest settlements to the 7.8 magnitude earthquake which occurred on 15 July 2009, the largest in New Zealand since 1931. Despite the earthquake's huge force, little damage was sustained and no injuries were reported.

== Demographics ==
Tuatapere is described as a rural settlement by Statistics New Zealand. It covers 2.00 km^{2} (0.77 sq mi), and had an estimated population of 560 as of June 2025, with a population density of 280 people per km^{2}. It is part of the much larger Longwood Forest statistical area.

Historical population for Tuatapere
Year	Pop.	±% p.a.
2006	579	—
2013	558	−0.53%
2018	531	−0.99%

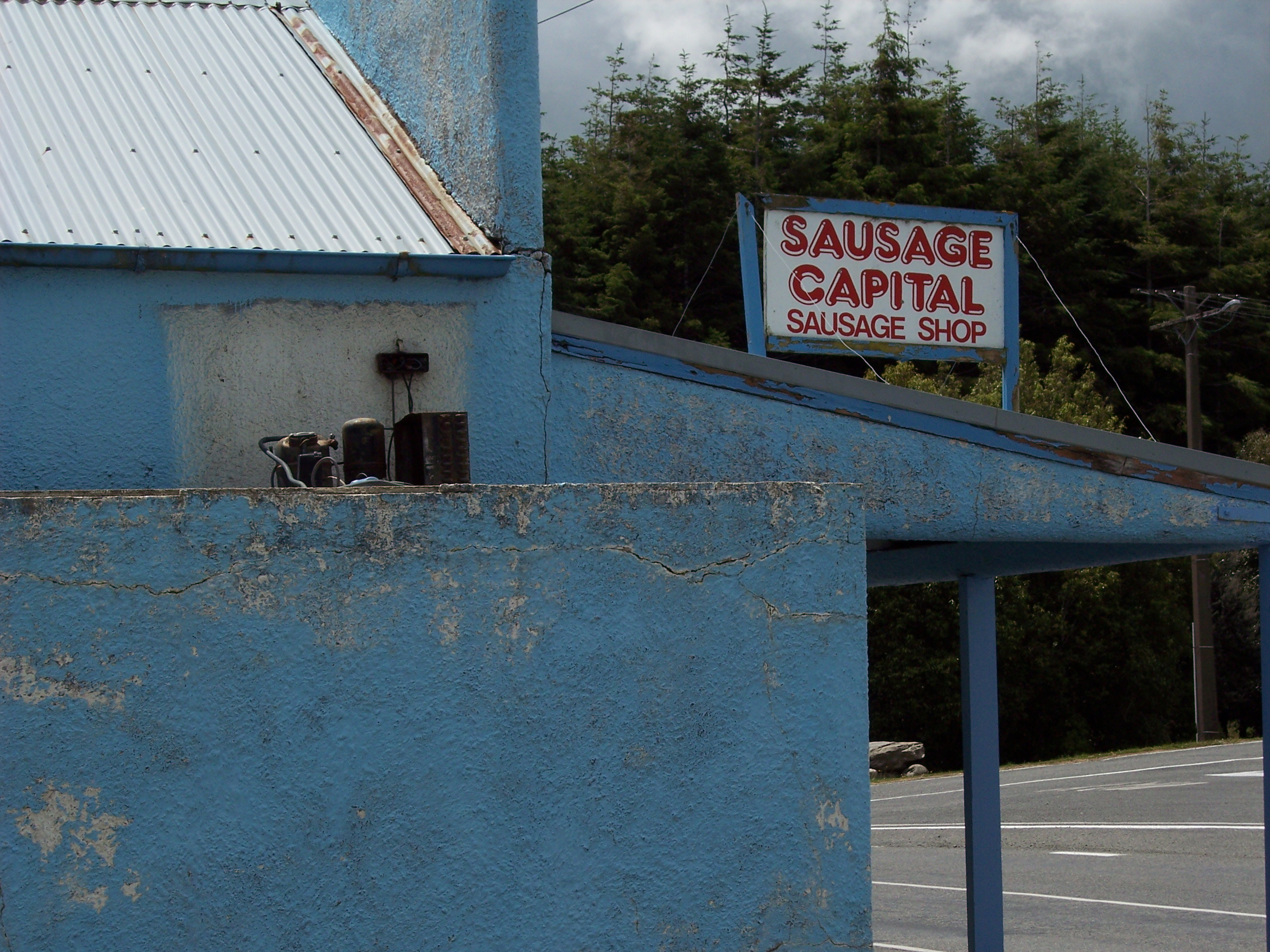
"Sausage Capital" sign

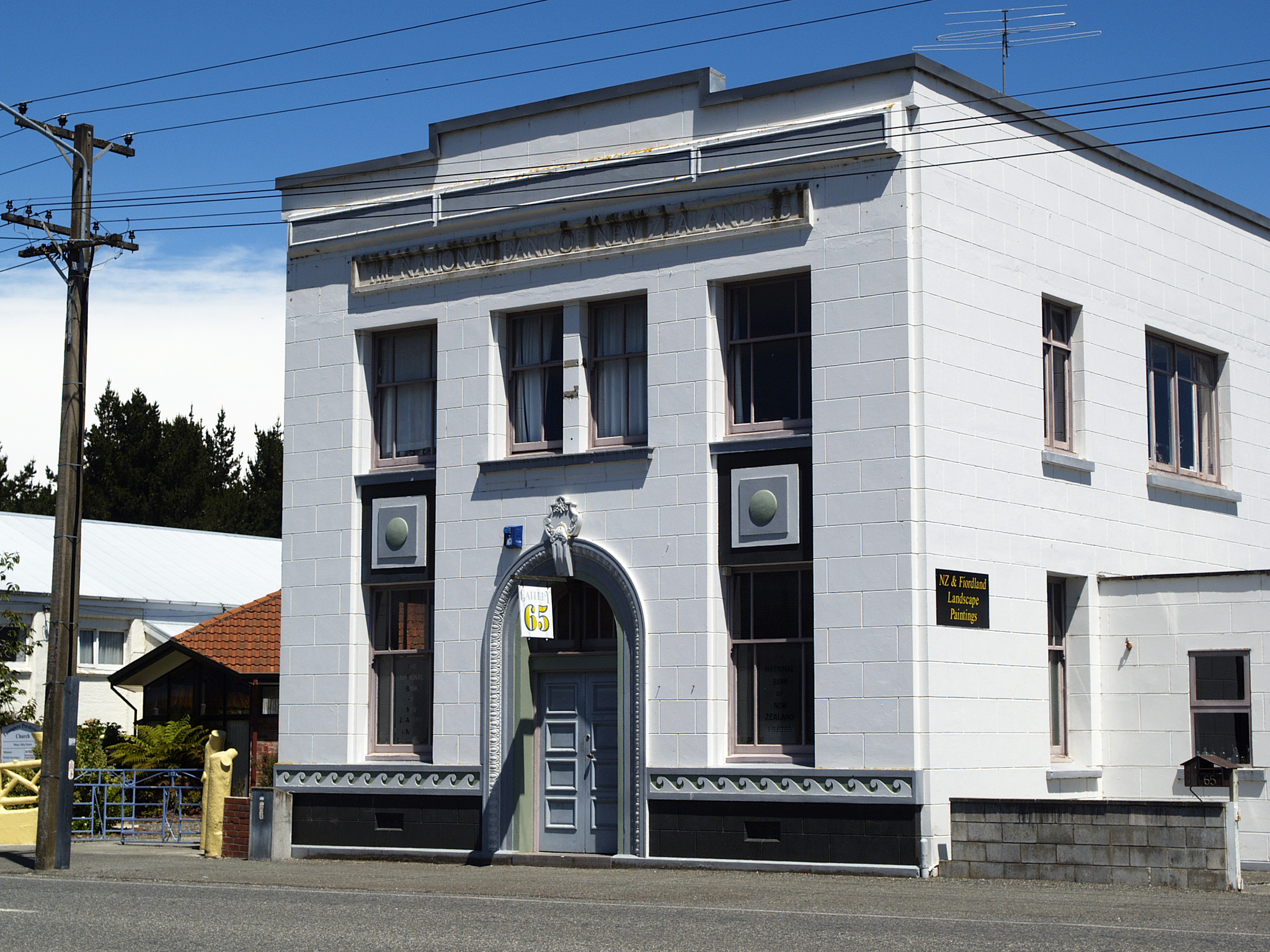
The former National Bank building

Tuatapere had a population of 531 at the 2018 New Zealand census, a decrease of 27 people (−4.8%) since the 2013 census, and a decrease of 48 people (−8.3%) since the 2006 census. There were 240 households, comprising 273 males and 258 females, giving a sex ratio of 1.06 males per female, with 81 people (15.3%) aged under 15 years, 84 (15.8%) aged 15 to 29, 237 (44.6%) aged 30 to 64, and 138 (26.0%) aged 65 or older.

Ethnicities were 90.4% European/Pākehā, 19.2% Māori, 1.7% Pasifika, 2.3% Asian, and 2.3% other ethnicities. People may identify with more than one ethnicity.

Although some people chose not to answer the census's question about religious affiliation, 52.5% had no religion, 32.8% were Christian, 1.1% had Māori religious beliefs, and 0.6% were Hindu.

Of those at least 15 years old, 39 (8.7%) people had a bachelor's or higher degree, and 162 (36.0%) people had no formal qualifications. 42 people (9.3%) earned over $70,000 compared to 17.2% nationally. The employment status of those at least 15 was that 201 (44.7%) people were employed full-time, 57 (12.7%) were part-time, and 15 (3.3%) were unemployed.

=== Longwood Forest ===
Longwood Forest statistical area covers 2,198.54 km^{2} (848.86 sq mi) and also includes Clifden. It had an estimated population of 2,180 as of June 2025, with a population density of 1.0 people per km^{2}.

Historical population for Longwood Forest
Year	Pop.	±% p.a.
2006	1,947	—
2013	1,995	+0.35%
2018	1,995	+0.00%

Longwood Forest had a population of 1,995 at the 2018 New Zealand census, unchanged since the 2013 census, and an increase of 48 people (2.5%) since the 2006 census. There were 801 households, comprising 1,080 males and 918 females, giving a sex ratio of 1.18 males per female. The median age was 41.4 years (compared with 37.4 years nationally), with 417 people (20.9%) aged under 15 years, 321 (16.1%) aged 15 to 29, 960 (48.1%) aged 30 to 64, and 294 (14.7%) aged 65 or older.

Ethnicities were 89.9% European/Pākehā, 12.8% Māori, 1.5% Pasifika, 4.4% Asian, and 2.3% other ethnicities. People may identify with more than one ethnicity.

The percentage of people born overseas was 10.4, compared with 27.1% nationally.

Although some people chose not to answer the census's question about religious affiliation, 55.2% had no religion, 32.8% were Christian, 0.3% had Māori religious beliefs, 0.3% were Hindu, 0.5% were Muslim, 0.6% were Buddhist and 1.1% had other religions.

Of those at least 15 years old, 180 (11.4%) people had a bachelor's or higher degree, and 420 (26.6%) people had no formal qualifications. The median income was $31,500, compared with $31,800 nationally. 171 people (10.8%) earned over $70,000 compared to 17.2% nationally. The employment status of those at least 15 was that 879 (55.7%) people were employed full-time, 255 (16.2%) were part-time, and 48 (3.0%) were unemployed.

== Education ==
Waiau Area School is a composite school for years 1 to 13 with a roll of 137 as of July 2026. The school first opened in 1910 as Tuatapere School providing primary education. It added secondary education in 1945, becoming Tuatapere District High, and later Waiau District High. In 1953 the school was rebuilt. The primary school split to become Tuatapere Primary in 1977, and the secondary school became Waiau College. The two schools merged again to form Tuatapere Community College in 2002, and this adopted the current name in 2012.

== Climate ==
Climate data for Tuatapere (1981–2010)
Month	Jan	Feb	Mar	Apr	May	Jun	Jul	Aug	Sep	Oct	Nov	Dec	Year
Mean daily maximum °C (°F)	19.7 (67.5)	19.8 (67.6)	18.5 (65.3)	16.1 (61.0)	12.9 (55.2)	10.4 (50.7)	10.1 (50.2)	12.0 (53.6)	14.2 (57.6)	15.8 (60.4)	17.2 (63.0)	18.6 (65.5)	15.4 (59.8)
Daily mean °C (°F)	14.7 (58.5)	14.4 (57.9)	13.1 (55.6)	11.0 (51.8)	8.5 (47.3)	6.0 (42.8)	5.8 (42.4)	7.1 (44.8)	9.0 (48.2)	10.4 (50.7)	11.9 (53.4)	13.6 (56.5)	10.5 (50.8)
Mean daily minimum °C (°F)	9.6 (49.3)	8.9 (48.0)	7.6 (45.7)	5.9 (42.6)	4.1 (39.4)	1.6 (34.9)	1.5 (34.7)	2.1 (35.8)	3.8 (38.8)	5.0 (41.0)	6.5 (43.7)	8.5 (47.3)	5.4 (41.8)
Average rainfall mm (inches)	162.9 (6.41)	122.8 (4.83)	99.5 (3.92)	102.9 (4.05)	120.3 (4.74)	92.2 (3.63)	97.8 (3.85)	90.9 (3.58)	63.8 (2.51)	105.1 (4.14)	75.3 (2.96)	104.0 (4.09)	1,237.5 (48.71)
Source: NIWA
