= Grebe River =

River of New Zealand

- Route of the Grebe River
- Mouth of the Grebe River Grebe River (South Island) Grebe River (New Zealand)

Location
- Country: New Zealand

Physical characteristics
- Source
  - coordinates: 45°48′21″S 167°18′10″E
- Mouth
  - location: Lake Manapouri
  - coordinates: 45°35′08″S 167°22′05″E
  - elevation: 118 m (387 ft)

Basin features
- Progression: Grebe River → Lake Manapouri → Waiau River → Foveaux Strait
- Tributaries
  - left: Fowler Stream, Jaquiery Stream, Florence Stream, Emerald Stream, Percy Stream

The Grebe River is a river in Fiordland, New Zealand. It arises north-west of Lake Monowai in an area once part of the lake but cut off by an enormous landslide about 13,000 years ago. The river now flows north, between the Townley Mountains to the west, and the Hunter Mountains to the east, and into Lake Manapouri's South Arm. Its major tributaries are Jaquiery Stream, Florence Stream, Emerald Stream, and Percy Stream, all from the west.

Borland Road runs along much of the Grebe Valley to Lake Manapouri. It was built in 1963 to support a transmission line between the lake and Tiwai Point aluminium smelter. A tramping track runs from the northern end of Lake Monowai to the head of the Grebe and up to the road. The Department of Conservation maintains several huts for trampers in the area.

Whitewater kayaking/canoeing is possible on the last three km of the Grebe, from Percy Valley to Lake Manapouri.

== See also ==
- List of rivers of New Zealand
