= Spey River (Southland) =

- Route of the Spey River
- Mouth of the Spey River Spey River (Southland) (South Island) Spey River (Southland) (New Zealand)
- Native name: Kāhuikākāpō

Location
- Country: New Zealand

Physical characteristics
- Source
  - location: Murrells Pass
  - coordinates: 45°34′42″S 167°07′46″E
  - elevation: 1,080 m (3,540 ft)
- Mouth
  - location: Lake Manapouri
  - coordinates: 45°31′36″S 167°16′23″E
  - elevation: 176 m (577 ft)

Basin features
- Progression: 'Spey River → Lake Manapouri → Waiau River → Foveaux Strait
- Tributaries
  - left: Waterfall Creek, Dashwood Stream, Mica Burn, Brae Burn
  - right: Warren Burn, Wynne Burn, Cockburn Stream, Diamond Creek, Sholl Stream, Todd Burn

The Spey River is a river in the Southland Region of New Zealand. Its entire length lies within the Fiordland National Park. The Spey rises at the Mckenzie Pass and Murrell's Pass either side of Mt Horatio (1,380 metres (4,530 ft), and the river flows in a northeasterly direction, emptying into the West Arm of Lake Manapouri adjacent to the intake of the Manapouri Power Station. The Dusky Track follows the Spey valley for much of the river's length.
