= Mary Enright =

New Zealand teacher, journalist, and community worker

Mary Teresa Enright MBE (22 July 1880 – 21 January 1966) was a New Zealand teacher, journalist and community worker. She was born in Charleston, West Coast, New Zealand, on 22 July 1880.

In the 1948 King's Birthday Honours, Enright was appointed a Member of the Order of the British Empire for social welfare work among women and children. In 1953, she was awarded the Queen Elizabeth II Coronation Medal.
