= Orauea River =

Coordinates: 46°08′S 167°42′E

Location
- Country: New Zealand

Physical characteristics
- Mouth
  - location: Waiau River (Southland)

The Orauea River is a river in New Zealand, a tributary of the Waiau River in Southland.

== See also ==
- List of rivers of New Zealand
