= Doon River =

- Route of the Doon River
- Mouth of the Doon River Doon River (South Island)

Location
- Country: New Zealand

Physical characteristics
- Source
  - coordinates: 45°04′16″S 167°25′32″E
- Mouth
  - location: Lake Te Anau
  - coordinates: 45°08′34″S 167°29′27″E
  - elevation: 204 m (669 ft)
- Length: 10 km (6.2 mi)

Basin features
- Progression: Doon River → South West Arm → Middle Fiord → Lake Te Anau → Waiau River → Foveaux Strait
- Tributaries
  - left: Campbell Creek, Pisgah Creek

The Doon River is a river in Fiordland, in the Southland Region of New Zealand. It arises near Mount Donald and flows south-east into the south-west arm of Lake Te Anau.

The river was explored by Quintin McPherson McKinnon and G. Tucker in 1887.

In 2002, the rainfall at Doon River was 8,719 millimetres (343 in), the highest in that year of any area in New Zealand with a regularly reporting rain gauge.

== See also ==
- List of rivers of New Zealand
