= 1948 Birthday Honours (New Zealand) =

Awards list for New Zealand

The 1948 King's Birthday Honours in New Zealand, celebrating the official birthday of King George VI, were appointments made by the King on the advice of the New Zealand government to various orders and honours to reward and highlight good works by New Zealanders. They were announced on 10 June 1948.

The recipients of honours are displayed here as they were styled before their new honour.

== Knight Bachelor ==
- Donald Charles Cameron – mayor of Dunedin.
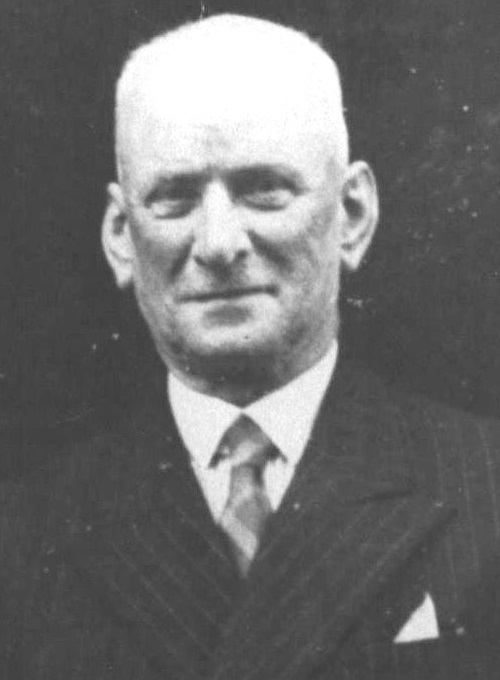
Sir Donald Cameron

== Order of Saint Michael and Saint George ==
=== Companion (CMG) ===
- Berkeley Lionel Scudamore Dallard – Undersecretary for Justice, Wellington.
- The Reverend John George Laughton – member of the Maori Mission Department of the Presbyterian Church, Ōhope.
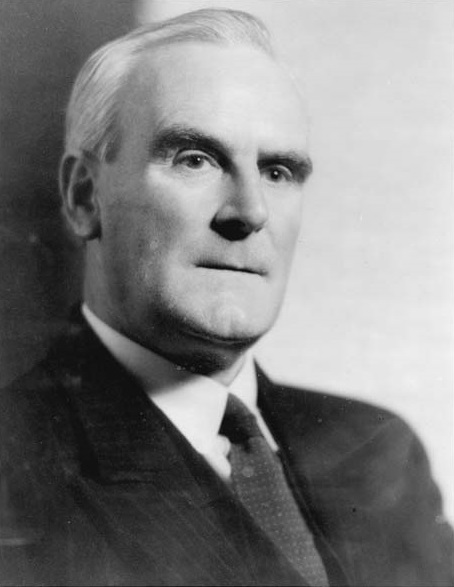
Berkeley Dallard

== Order of the British Empire ==
=== Knight Commander (KBE) ===
Civil division

- Major-General Howard Karl Kippenberger CB CBE DSO – of Wellington; editor-in-chief, New Zealand war histories, and vice-president of the New Zealand Returned Services' Association.

Military division

- Major-General Norman William McDonald Weir CB CBE – Chief of the General Staff, New Zealand Military Forces.
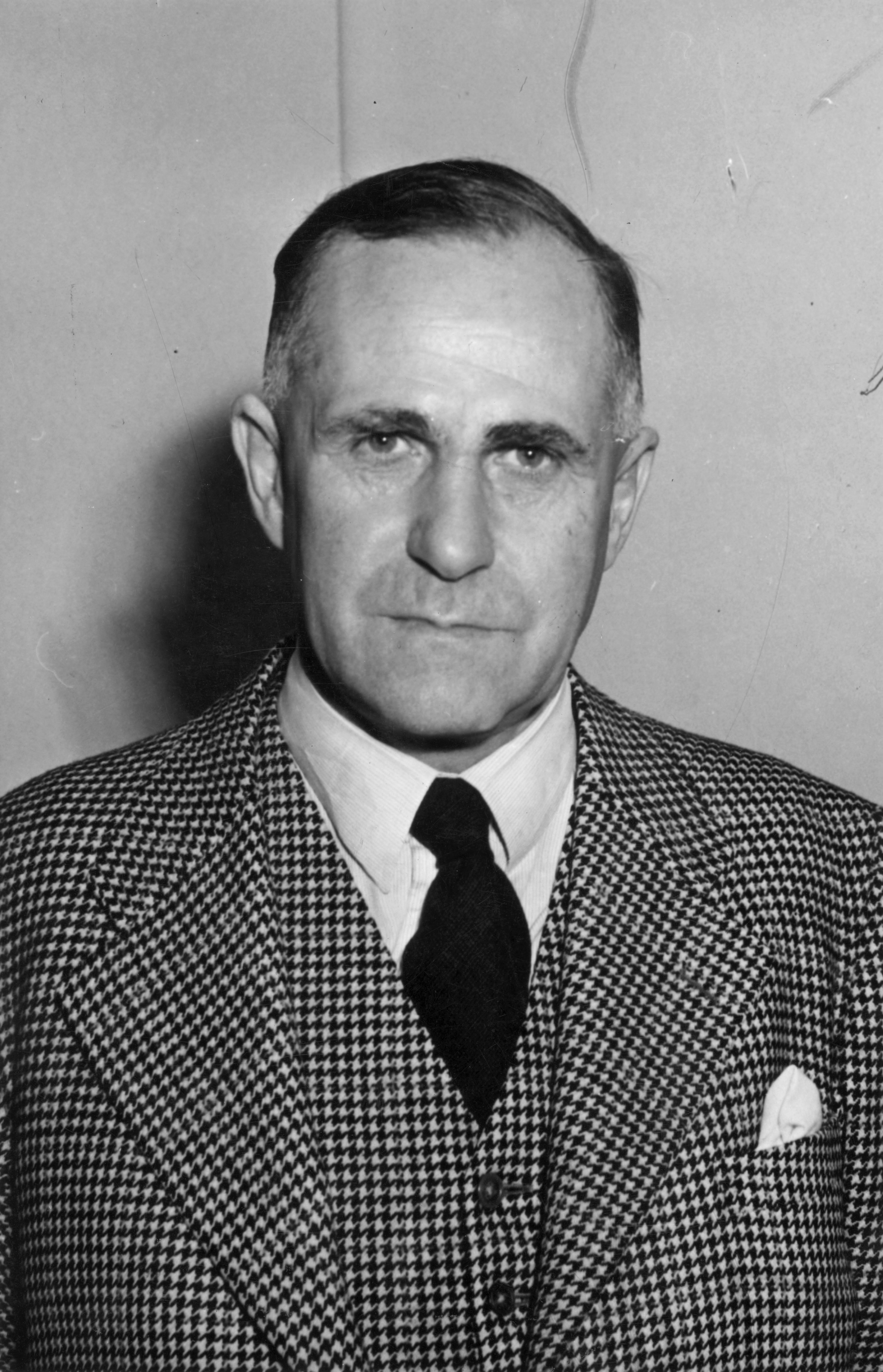
Sir Howard Kippenberger

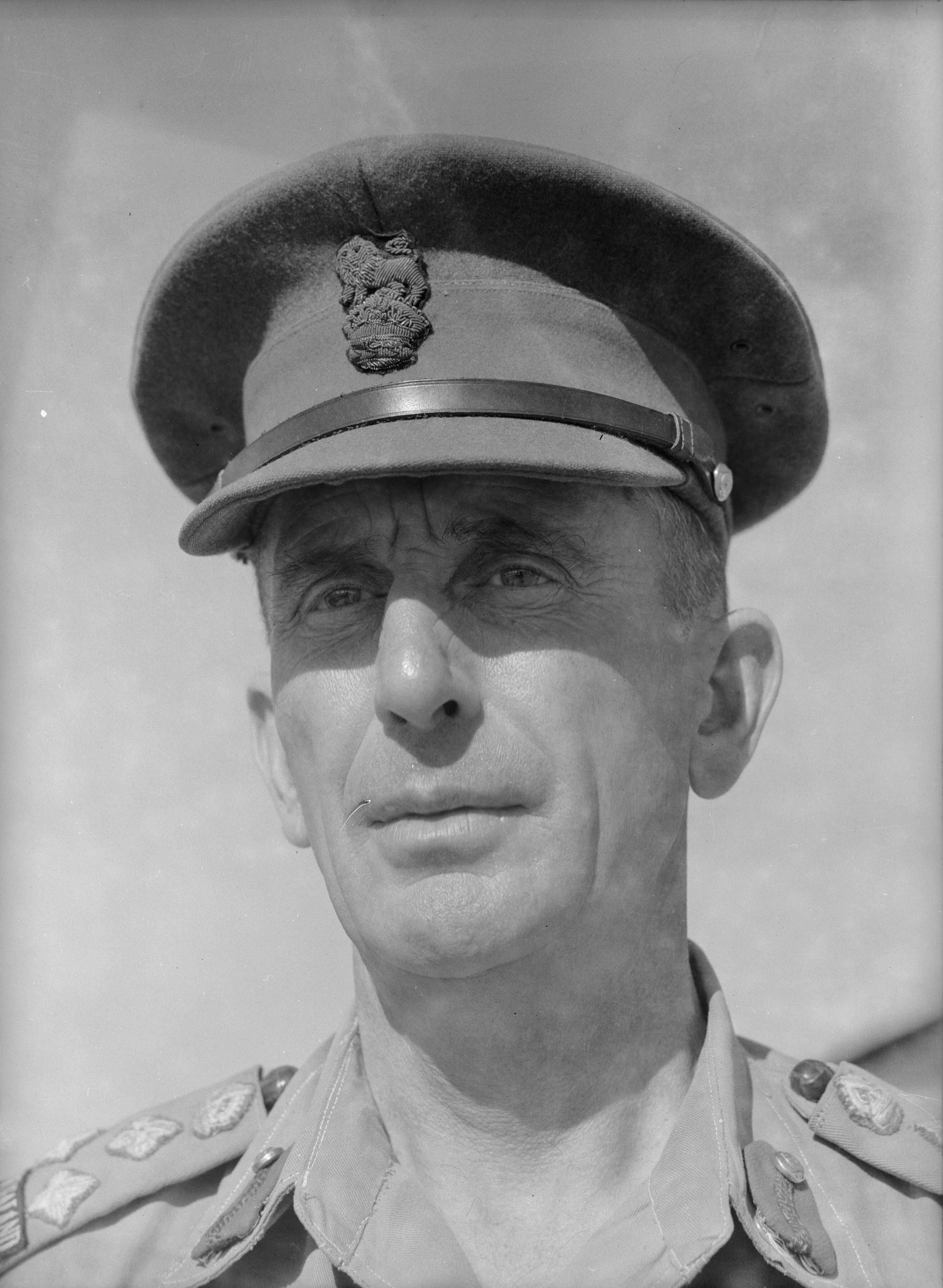
Sir Norman Weir

=== Commander (CBE) ===
Civil division

- Harry Howard Barton Allan DSc MA – of Wellington; director of Botany Division, Plant Research Bureau. For services in the field of botany in New Zealand.
- William Robert Brugh – of Dunedin; president, Otago Early Settlers' Association. For services to education.
- Agnes Lang Loudon – of Auckland; formerly headmistress, Epsom Girls' Grammar School.
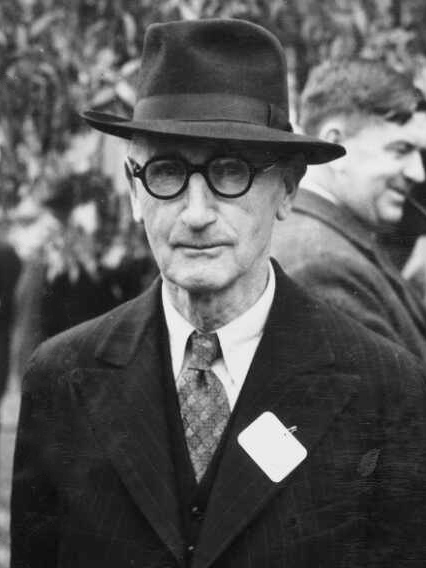
Harry Allan

=== Officer (OBE) ===
Civil division

- Agnes Elizabeth Lloyd Bennett MBE MD CM – of Lowry Bay. For services as medical practitioner in Wellington.
- Percy Leslie Foote FRCSEd MRCS LRCP – of Westport; medical superintendent, Buller Hospital.
- Athol Eady Gibbons – of Hamilton; Dominion chairman of the New Zealand Red Cross Society.
- Thomas Jackson – of Rotorua; formerly mayor of Rotorua.
- Martin Maxwell Fleming Luckie – of Wellington; formerly deputy mayor of Wellington City Council.
- Edith Ngaio Marsh – of Christchurch. For services in connexion with drama and literature in New Zealand.
- Wiremu Teihoka Parata – of Seacliff; elder of Ngāi Tahu tribe. For services to the Māori people.
- Emily Margaret Sparkes – of Christchurch; matron of St Helen's Hospital, Christchurch.
- Percy Vernon Esmond Stainton MBE – of New Plymouth. For services in connexion with patriotic and welfare work in New Plymouth.
- David Tannock – of Dunedin; formerly superintendent of reserves, Dunedin. For services to horticulture in New Zealand.

Military division

- Commander (S) Herbert Russell Sleeman MBE – Royal New Zealand Navy.
- Colonel (temporary) John Ingham Brooke – New Zealand Regular Force.
- Wing Commander Francis Ross Dix – Royal New Zealand Air Force.
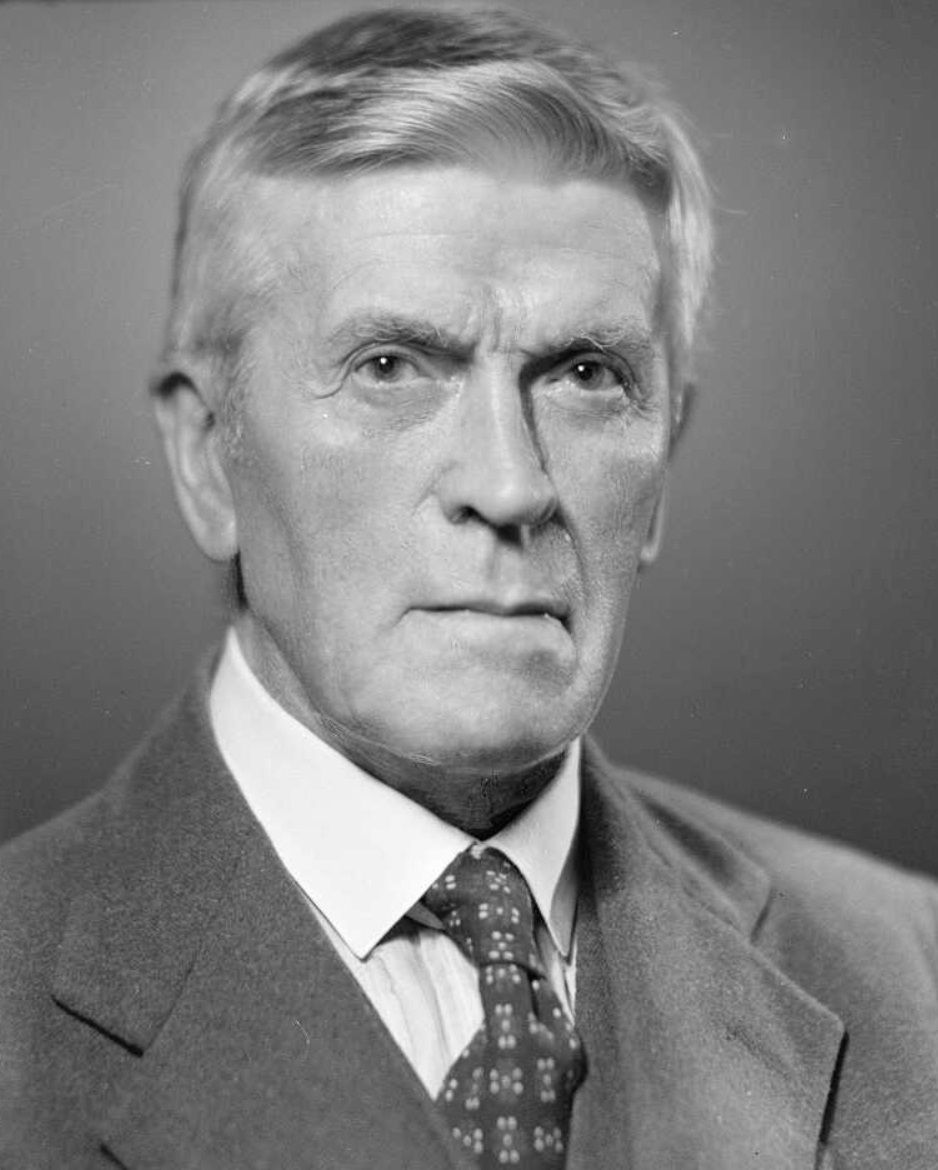
Martin Luckie

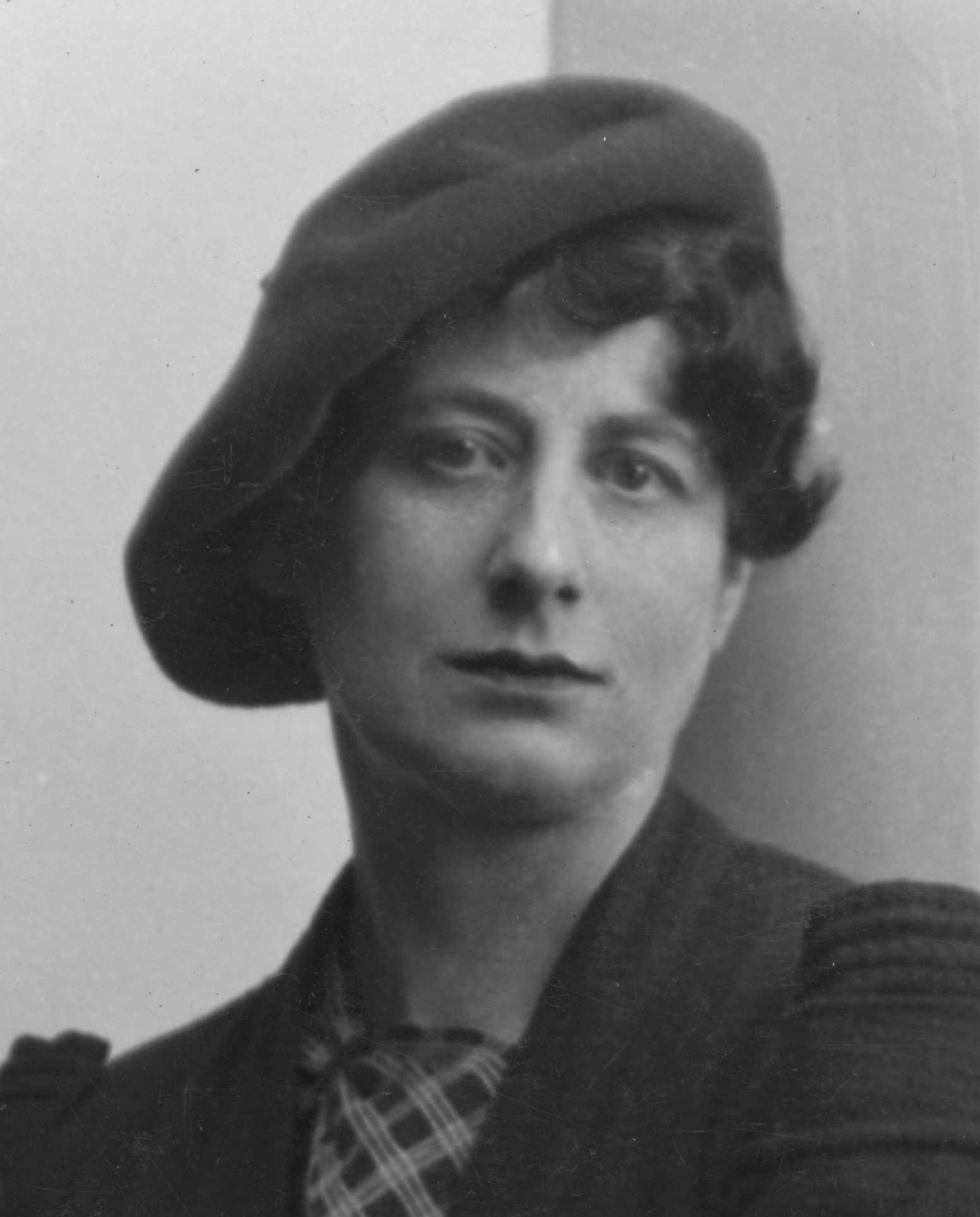
Ngaio Marsh

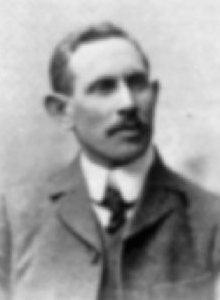
David Tannock

=== Member (MBE) ===
Civil division

- John Bennetts – of Roxburgh; chairman of New Zealand Fruit Growers' Federation.
- Mabel Lillian Campbell – of Auckland. For patriotic and social welfare work.
- Amelia Emily Carpenter – of Waipukurau; formerly mayoress of Waipukurau.
- Ada Frances Cochrane – of Gore. For patriotic and social welfare work.
- Mary Teresa Enright – of Christchurch. For social welfare work among women and children.
- Alfred Fraser – of Auckland; inspector of storehousemen at HM New Zealand Dockyard.
- Muriel Archer Guthrie – of Wellington. For services among disabled servicemen.
- Mary Alice Hall – of Helensville. For services as district nurse.
- Amy May Hutchinson – of Auckland; secretary of Auckland branch of Society for the Protection of Women and Children.
- Marie Louise Dansey Iles – of Havelock North; Dominion secretary to New Zealand Girl Guides' Association.
- Charles Mallia – of Wellington; president of the Catholic Maritime League in New Zealand.
- Hugh Livingstone McKinnon – of Pahiatua. For services as headmaster of the school at the Polish camp, Pahiatua.
- Alfred Hamish Reed – of Dunedin. For services in connexion with publication of historical and other New Zealand works.
- Clara Emily Marion Rogers – of Rangiora; formerly matron of the Christchurch YMCA.
- Thomas James McDowell Tweed – of Dunedin; of YMCA.

Military division

- Major and Quartermaster Claude Harold Kidman MM – Royal New Zealand Medical Corps.
- Captain (temporary) Robert Lepper DCM – New Zealand Temporary Staff.
- Captain and Quartermaster Leslie Mossong – Royal New Zealand Artillery.
- Junior Commander (Mrs) Mabel Emma Steele – New Zealand Women's Army Auxiliary Corps.
- Warrant Officer Gilbert James McKay – Royal New Zealand Air Force.
- Section Officer May Catherine Middleton – New Zealand Women's Auxiliary Air Force.
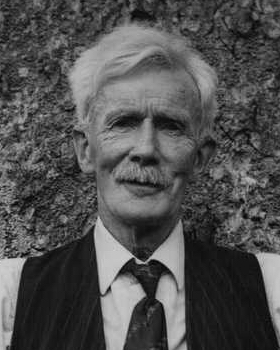
A. H. Reed

== Companion of the Imperial Service Order (ISO) ==
- Frederick Templeton Manheim Kissel – of Wellington; formerly general manager, State Hydro-Electric Department, New Zealand.
- George Patrick Shepherd – of Wellington; formerly chief judge, Native Land Court, and Undersecretary of Maori Affairs.

== British Empire Medal (BEM) ==
Civil division

- Montague William George Wareham – of Auckland; senior magazine storeman, HM New Zealand Dockyard, Auckland.

Military division

- Engine Room Artificer 1st Class Fred Broadbent – Royal New Zealand Navy.
- Ordnance Artificer Third Class Ernest Gard – Royal New Zealand Navy.
- Chief Petty Officer John William Jeffcote – Royal New Zealand Navy.
- Private (temporary Warrant Officer 2nd Class) Andrew Wilfred Stewart Murray – New Zealand Regiment.
- Private (temporary Warrant Officer 1st Class) Roy Veysey – New Zealand Temporary Staff.
- Flight Sergeant Francis James Herbert Patterson – Royal New Zealand Air Force.
- Flight Sergeant Eric William Scott – Royal New Zealand Air Force.

== Air Force Cross (AFC) ==
- Flight Lieutenant Basil John Townsend Heath – Royal New Zealand Air Force.
- Flight Lieutenant John Richard Wenden – Royal New Zealand Air Force.

== King's Commendation for Valuable Service in the Air ==
- Flight Lieutenant Colin Beresford Knight DFM – Royal New Zealand Air Force.
- Flying Officer Lloyd Kenrick Burch – Royal New Zealand Air Force.
