= Lake Te Anau =

Lake in the South Island of New Zealand

- Māori: Te Ana-au
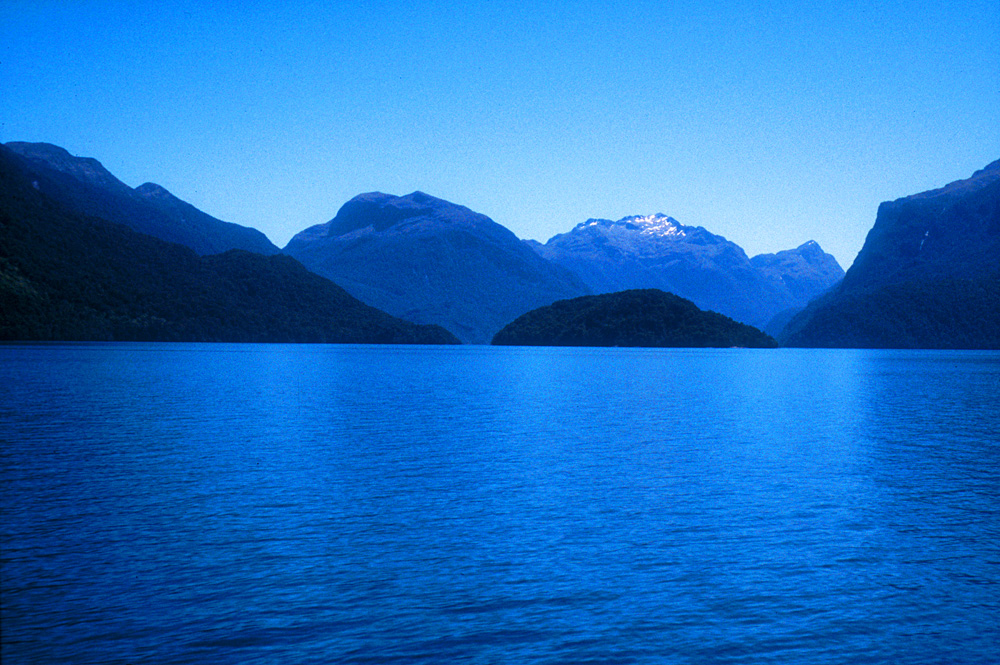
- Lake Te Anau

- Location within South Island
- Interactive map of Lake Te Anau
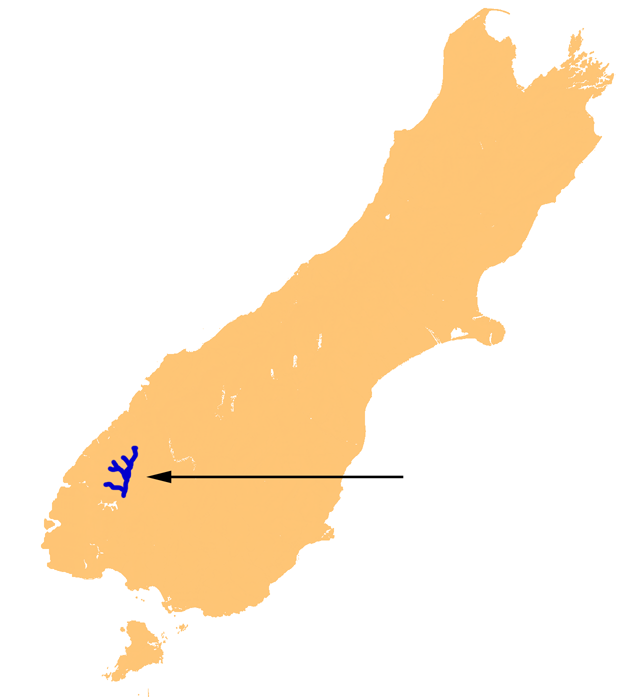
- Lake Te Anau
- Location: Southland District, Southland Region, South Island
- Coordinates: 45°12′S 167°48′E
- Primary inflows: Eglinton River, Clinton River, Worsley River, Glaisnock River, Wapiti River, Doon River, McKenzie Burn, Upukerora River
- Primary outflows: Waiau River
- Basin countries: New Zealand
- Max. length: 65 km (40 mi)
- Surface area: 344 km^{2} (133 sq mi)
- Average depth: 168.8 m (554 ft)
- Max. depth: 425 m (1,394 ft)
- Water volume: 58.06 km^{3} (13.93 cu mi)
- Surface elevation: 210 m (690 ft)
- Settlements: Te Anau

Lake Te Anau (Māori: Te Ana-au) is in the southwestern corner of the South Island of New Zealand. The lake covers an area of 344 km^{2} (133 sq mi), making it the second-largest lake by surface area in New Zealand (after Lake Taupō) and the largest in the South Island. It is the second largest lake in Australasia by fresh water volume. The main body of the lake runs north-south, and is 65 km in length. Three large fiords form arms to the lake on its western flank: North Fiord, Middle Fiord and South Fiord. These are the only inland fiords that New Zealand has, the other 14 are out on the coast. Several small islands lie in the entrance to Middle Fiord, which forks partway along its length into northwest and southwest arms. The surface of the lake is at an altitude of 210 m. It has a maximum depth of 425 m, so much of its bed lies below sea level, with the deepest part of the lake being 215 metres below sea level.

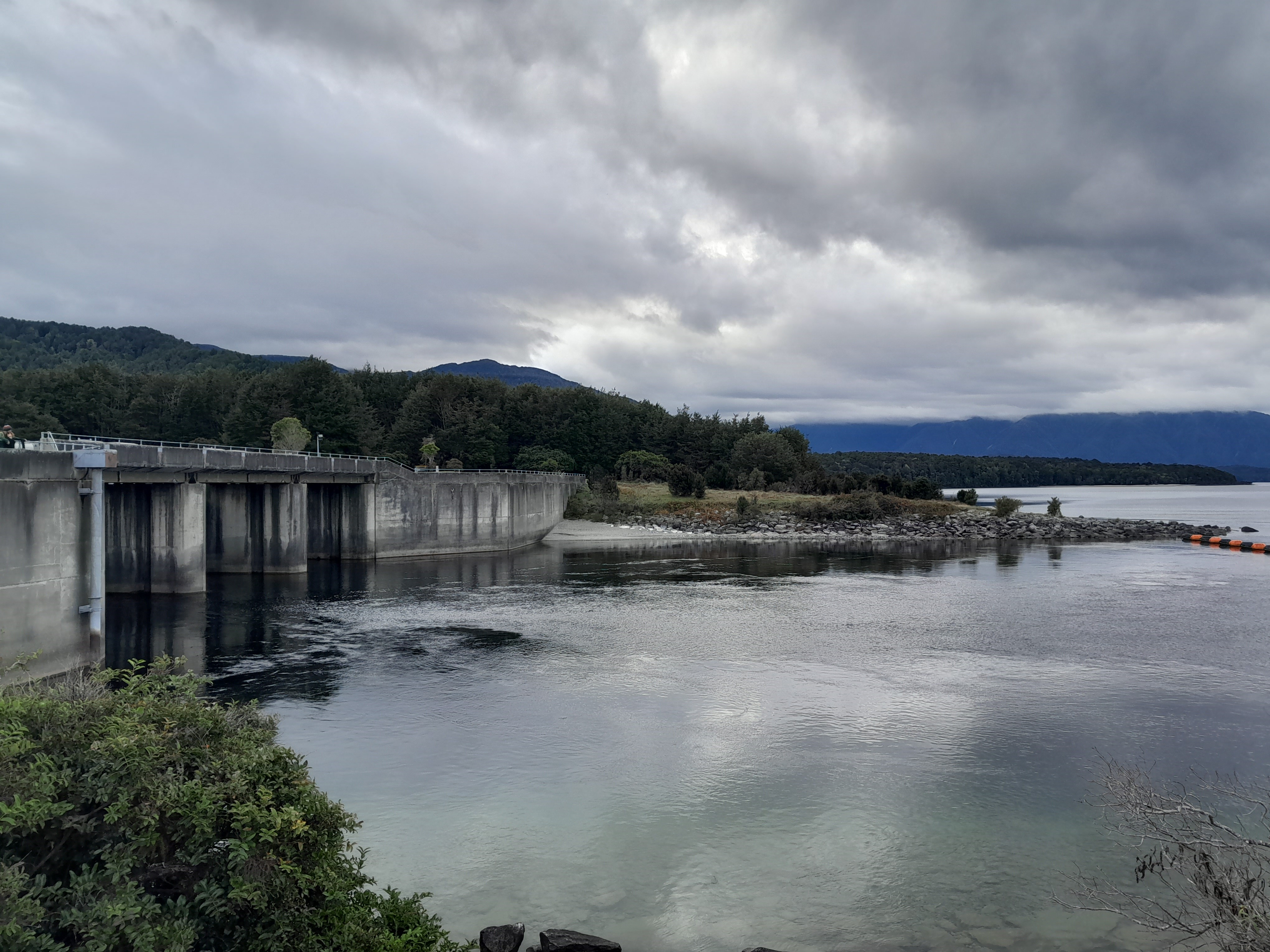
The Lake Te Anau control gates which control the flow of water from Lake Te Anau into the Waiau river and maintain the water level between 201.5 and 202.7 metres above sea level.

Several rivers feed the lake, of which the most important is the Eglinton River, which joins the lake from the east, opposite the entrance to North Fiord. The outflow is the Waiau River, which flows south for several kilometres into Lake Manapouri. The town of Te Anau lies at the south-eastern corner of the lake, close to the outflow.

Most of the lake is within Fiordland National Park and the Te Wahipounamu World Heritage Site, the latter of which was officially recognised internationally in 1990. Other than the Te Anau township, the only human habitation close to the lake is the farming settlement of Te Anau Downs, close to the mouth of the Eglinton River. Between these two settlements the land is rolling hill country, but elsewhere the land is mountainous, especially along its western shore, where the Kepler and Murchison Mountains rise 1,400 m above the surface of the lake.

Lake Te Anau is important for the Ngāi Tahu iwi, (Note: The Māori word for tribe) in pre-European times, prior to being displaced by European encroachment, the area was a traditional stopping point on their trails between the east and west coasts of the South Island of New Zealand, where they obtained food and resources. The lake was first discovered by Europeans in 1852, by explorers Charles Nairn and William Stephen.

Two New Zealand Great Walks start at the lake. The Milford Track starts at the northern tip of the lake and the Kepler Track starts and ends at the south tip of the lake at the Waiau River.

== Name ==
The English translation of the Māori name Te Anau has been disputed. It was supposed by many that Te Anau was the name of the granddaughter of Hekeia, a chief of the Waitaha tribe, whose name now belongs to a mountain on the Longwood Range. When the Te Ana-au Caves were rediscovered in 1948, earlier explanations of the name were replaced by the interpretation of the full name Te Ana-au, Māori for 'The cave of swirling water'.

== Flora and fauna ==
Numerous species of wildlife and vegetation are found in the watershed of Lake Te Anau. Vegetative understory includes numerous fern species including the crown fern, Blechnum discolor.

Several species of endangered birds live around the shores of Lake Te Anau, notably the takahē (Notornis hochstetteri). An area between the Middle and South Fiords called the Murchison Mountains is a sanctuary set aside for these birds. The western shore of the lake also features the Te Ana-au Caves.

== Recreation ==
Throughout summer the lake is used for boating, fishing, kayaking, swimming and access to Fiordland National Park. The lake is home to both the Marakura Yacht Club and the Te Anau Boating Club. Every year on the weekend of Labour Day a fishing competition is held.

== See also ==
- List of lakes in New Zealand

== Sources ==
- Fiordland (Map) (5th ed.). 1 : 255,000. Parkmap. Cartography by GeoSmart (NZ) Ltd. New Zealand Department of Conservation. 2004.
- C. Michael Hogan. 2009. Crown Fern: Blechnum discolor, Globaltwitcher.com, ed. N. Stromberg
