= Waiau River (Southland) =

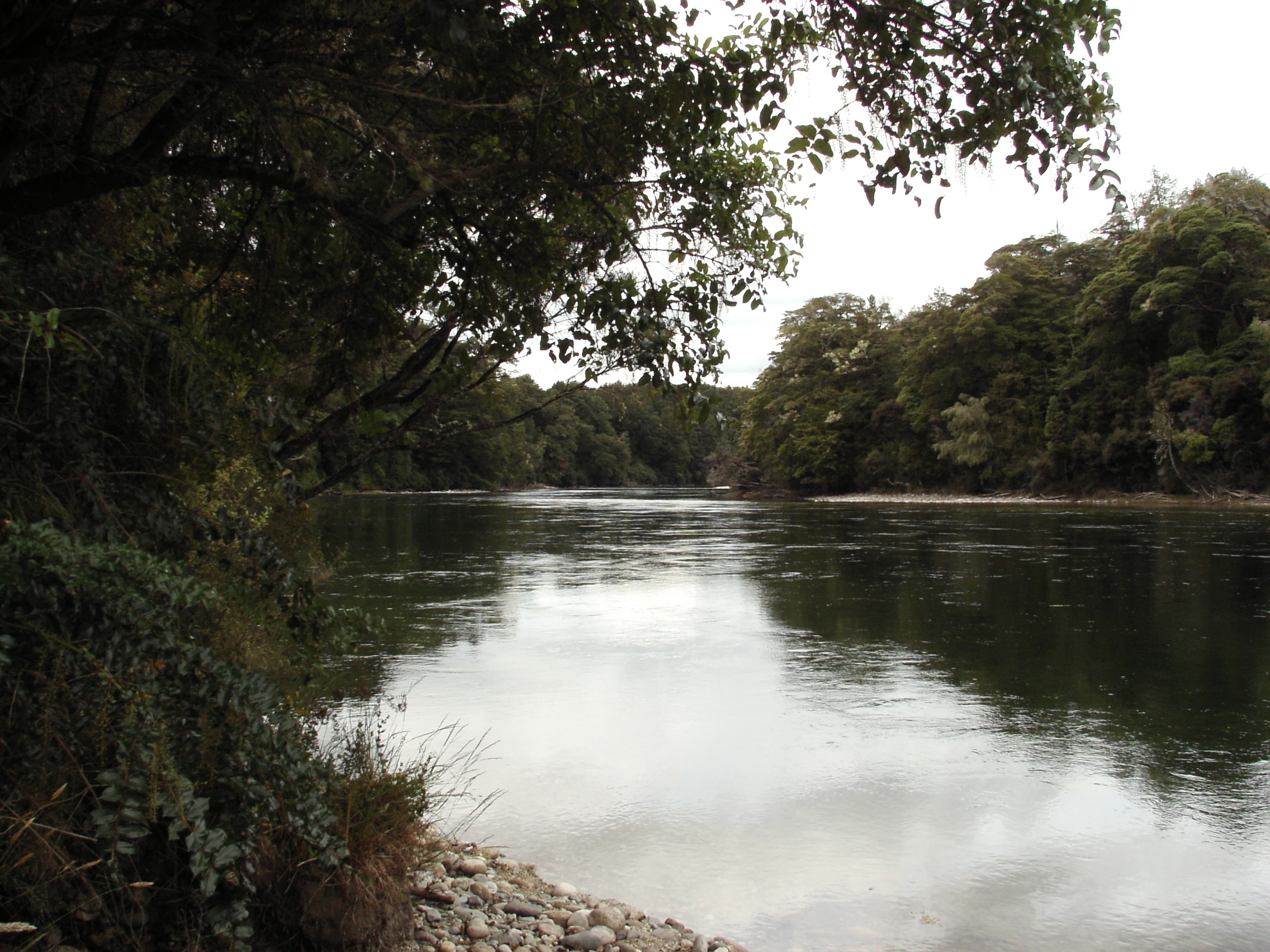
- Looking out on the Waiau River
- Route of the Waiau River
- Mouth of the Waiau River Waiau River (Southland) (South Island) Waiau River (Southland) (New Zealand)

Location
- Country: New Zealand

Physical characteristics
- Source: The Outlet
  - location: Lake Te Anau
  - coordinates: 45°26′26″S 167°41′13″E
  - elevation: 184 m (604 ft)
- Mouth
  - location: Te Waewae Bay, Foveaux Strait
  - coordinates: 46°11′40″S 167°36′53″E
  - elevation: 0 m (0 ft)

Basin features
- Progression: Waiau River → Te Waewae Bay → Foveaux Strait
- Tributaries
  - left: Home Creek, Mararoa River, Excelsior Creek, Whare Creek, Little Creek, Redcliff Creek, Waicoe Creek, Makarewa Stream, McIvor Creek, Wairaki River, Merton Creek, Orauea River, Boundary Creek, Camp Creek
  - right: Forest Burn, Borland Burn, Monowai River, Diggers Creek, Dean Burn, Lill Burn, Alton Burn
- Waterbodies: Yerex Reach, Queens Reach, Rainbow Reach, Wairoa, Balloon Loop, Boulder Reach, Lake Manapouri
- Bridges: Rainbow Reach Bridge, Clifden Suspension Bridge, Waiau River Bridge,
- Inland ports: Pearl Harbour

The Waiau River is the largest river in the Southland region of New Zealand. 'Waiau' translates to 'River of Swirling Currents'. It is the outflow of Lake Te Anau, flowing from it into Lake Manapouri 10 kilometres (6 mi) to the south, and from there flows south for 70 kilometres (43 mi) before reaching the Foveaux Strait 8 kilometres (5 mi) south of Tuatapere. It also takes water from Lake Monowai.

The Upper Waiau River that flows between Lakes Manapouri and Te Anau doubled as the fictional River Anduin at the end of the first film of The Lord of the Rings film trilogy, for the scenes where the Uruk-hai chase the Fellowship along the river banks. A proposal that a 2-kilometre (1.2 mi) stretch of river below the area known as Balloon Loop be named the Anduin Reach to honour New Zealand film maker Peter Jackson for his use of the area as the River Anduin was rejected by the New Zealand Geographic Board in April 2009.

== Geography ==
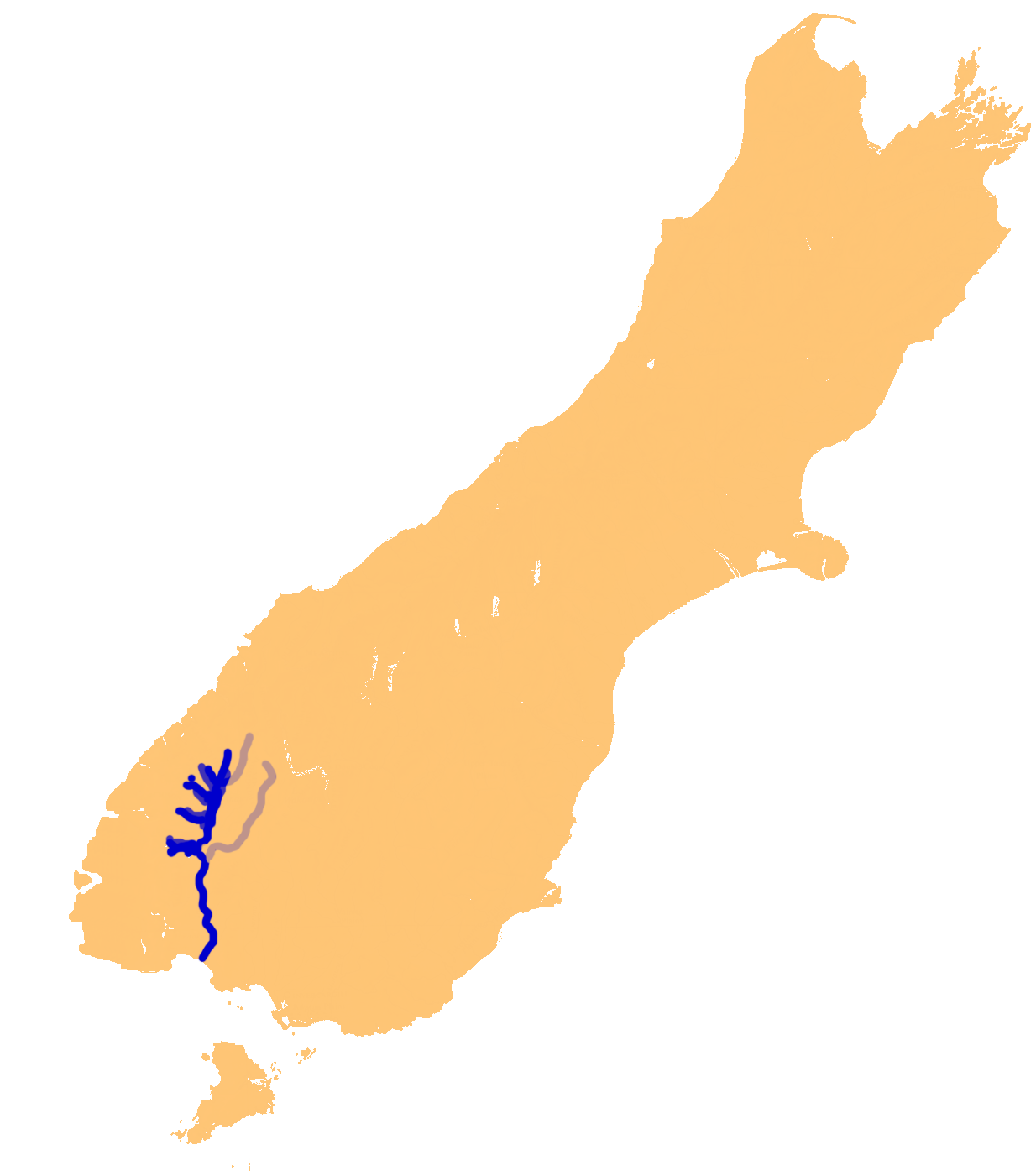
The Waiau River system

The Waiau River is the largest river system in the southwestern corner of the South Island. It has its sources in the Eglinton and Clinton Rivers, both of which are major inflows to Lake Te Anau, one of the two large lakes formed from glaciation which are part of the Waiau's system. Other rivers to flow into Te Anau include the Glaisnock River, Wapiti, Doon, and Upukerora Rivers, as well as numerous burns, of which the largest are the Junction, Woodrow, Ettrick, Snag, and Mackenzie Burns.

The Waiau, so named, flows from the southern tip of Te Anau and meanders for some 12 kilometres along the western edge of a small plain before entering the northeastern corner of Lake Manapouri, the second of the two large lakes in the Waiau system. Manapouri is also fed by the Spey and Grebe Rivers, as well as the Freeman, Awe, and Iris Burns. The Waiau flows out of the lake in the southeast, close to the small town of Manapouri, and shortly thereafter is joined by the waters of the Mararoa River.

From here, the Waiau continues south across a relatively narrow plain, fed by numerous small creeks and burns, the largest of which are the Excelsior, Whare and Redcliff Creeks and the Borland Burn. At Monowai it is met by the Monowai River, the outflow of a further glacially formed lake, also named Monowai. At the Waiau's junction with the small Wairaki River the plain widens. From here the Waiau is fed by numerous other streams and burns, notably the Lill Burn close to Clifden and the Alton Burn, as well as the Orauea River, close to Tuatapere. As the river nears the coast it widens, with several small low-lying islands contained within its channels At its mouth on Te Waewae Bay, the river forms a long tidal lagoon separated from the sea by a narrow sandbar which extends along the coast for several kilometres.

== Geology ==
The Waiau River and several places connected to it have given their names to stages of the New Zealand geologic time scale. These are the Altonian (after Alton Burn), Clifdenian (after Clifden), Lillburnian (after Lill Burn), and Waiauan stages, which consecutively run from 18.7 to 11.01 million years ago.

== Flora and fauna ==
There are diverse species in the forested catchment basin of the Waiau River. Vegetative understory within most of the Fiordland National Park includes numerous fern species including the crown fern (Lomaria discolor).

Several species of endangered birds live around the shores of Lake Te Anau, and the upper Waiau River, notably the Takahē (Notornis hochstetteri). An area between the Middle and South Fiords called the Murchison Mountains is a sanctuary set aside for these birds. The western shore of Lake Te Anau also holds the Te Ana-au Caves, from which Lake Te Anau derives its name.

Toxic levels of the algae benthic cyanobacteria were found in December 2018 where the Waiau River runs by Tuatapere. High levels of nutrients or sediment run off into waterways combined with high summer temperatures and low summer flows are the main factors that lead to the growth of toxic algae.

In Summer 2019 and 2018 the Waiau River had high levels of Escherichia coli, Environment Southland gave the river an 'amber' warning, advising caution if swimming. E-Coli comes from the intestines of humans or animals and is introduced to the environment through feces.

In December 2019 the New Zealand Government set up the 'Thriving Southland' Change and Innovation Project, allocating nine million dollars across Southland's 21 river catchment groups to help farmers and growers lift their environmental sustainability.

== Fisheries and wildlife ==
Near the mouth of the Waiau River is the Te Wae Wae wetlands, built by the Waiau Fisheries and Wildlife Habitat Enhancement Trust on 25 hectares of land leased from Meridian Energy and the Department of Conservation. This wetland habitat allows juvenile whitebait to grow to maturity and other wetland species to breed. It is the largest of several wetland areas developed by the trust to increase the diversity and habitat of Waiau native species and improve the water quality of the river. The area was historically wetland which was drained to convert into farm land.

The Waiau Fisheries and Wildlife Habitat Enhancement Trust was established in 1996 to mitigate the effects of the Manapōuri Hydro Electric Power Scheme. The trust works with landowners and farmers to improve waterways. "Farming has had an impact on the Waiau catchment so it was important for the Trust to engage with individual farmers and Landcorp who have several farms on the river." said Trust Field Officer Mark Sutton. By filtering agricultural run-off in smaller streams and ponds and fencing stock off from waterways, the overall health of the Waiau River is able to improve. An estimated 90% of New Zealand wetlands have been lost over the last 150 years due to being drained or filled. The lower Waiau River still has very few wetlands.

150–200 of New Zealand's endangered Black-Billed Gulls were found dead in the lower Waiau River in 2019, autopsies showed the gulls had died from starvation.

== Tourism ==
In March 2007, the Fiordland Trails Trust was established to build a cycle trail along the banks of the Upper Waiau, linking the Township of Te Anau to the Township of Manapouri.

A survey of the “Anduin Reach” was conducted in 2007, and landmark names were proposed based on the Lord of the Rings film trilogy. It was decided that Anduin Reach should be the place name to help promote the future prospects of the Cycle Trail Project.

Twelve wetlands are publicly accessible for walking and recreation.

The Upper Waiau River is a popular spot for fishing for brown trout and salmon.

In 2017, both the Southern Scenic Jetboat company and the Fiordland Jet Company started running jetboats on the Waiau River.

== Gallery ==
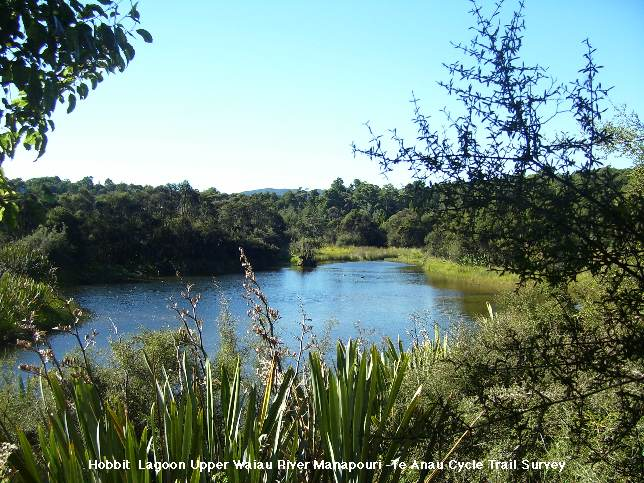
Hobbit Lagoon Upper Waiau River

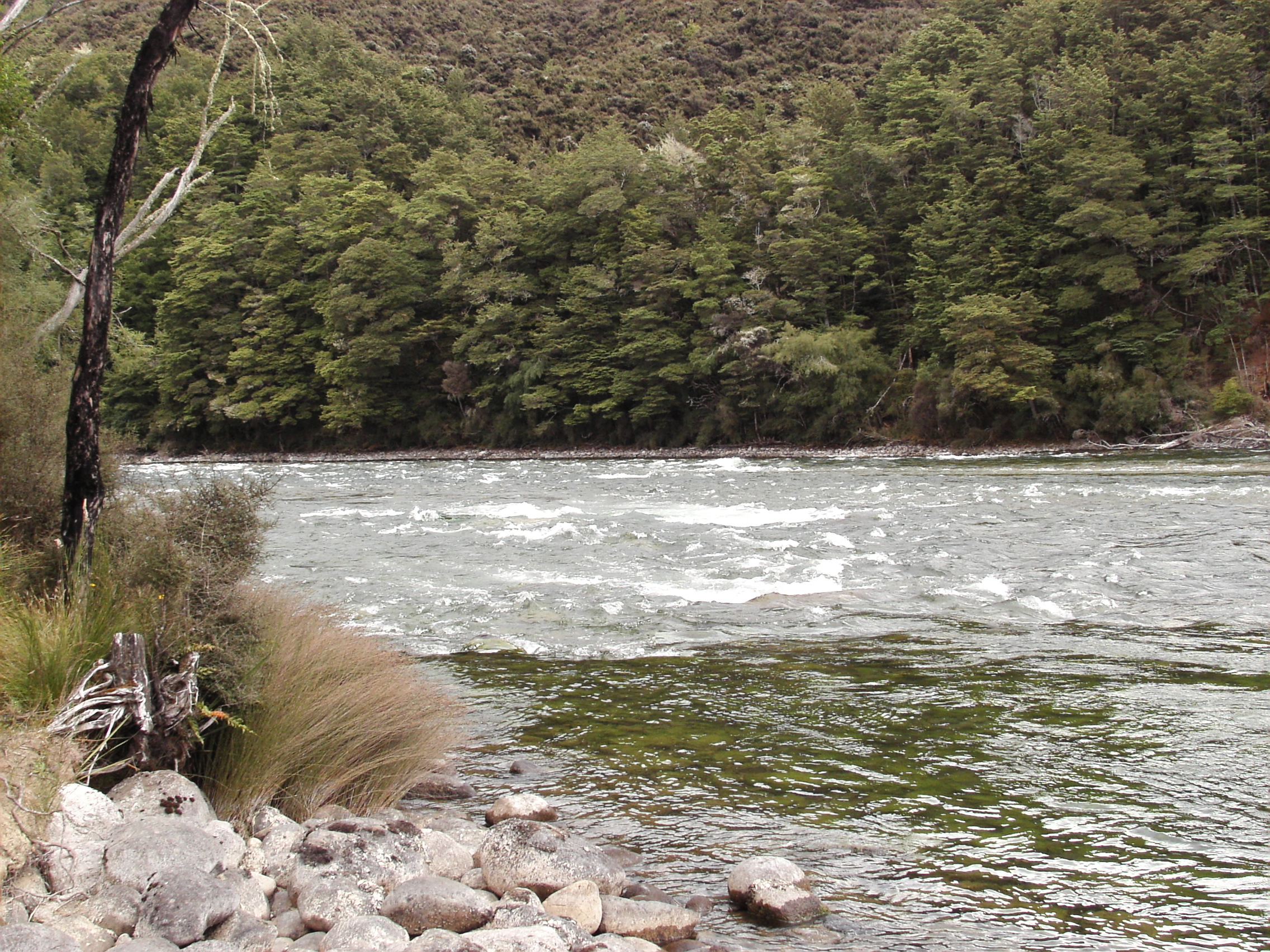
Shallows on the Waiau River

Clifden Suspension Bridge
