= Clifden Limestone Caves =

Cave system in the south of New Zealand

Coordinates: 46°1′6″S 167°44′27″E

Location of Clifden Cave System on the South Island of New Zealand.

The Clifden Limestone Cave System is in the Western Southland Region of New Zealand, on private land close to the hamlet of Clifden.

== Geology ==
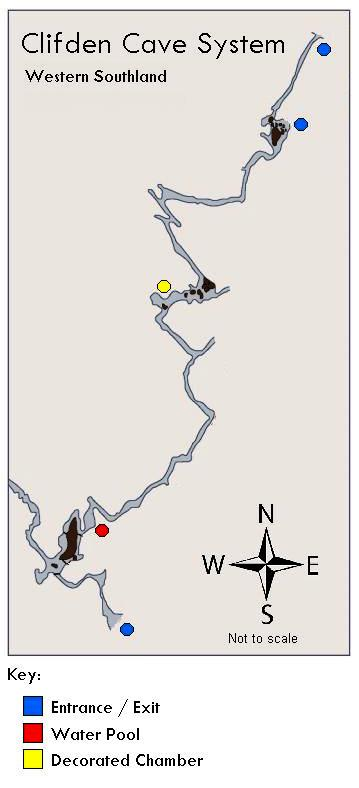

The cave is formed in Miocene limestone created from the accumulation of shell fragments, sand and pebbles in the Epeiric Zealandia sea. It is a solutional cave.

== Ecology ==
Glow worms or titiwai (Arachnocampa luminosa) find a natural habitat in the Clifden Cave System because of its damp environment with little or no wind.

== Recreation ==
The cave system runs about 300 metres (980 ft). A marked through route with fixed ladders is available for properly equipped people who wish to experience caving, and other passages are accessible for experienced cavers.

== See also ==
- List of caves in New Zealand
