= Glaisnock River =

- Route of the Glaisnock River
- Mouth of the Glaisnock River Glaisnock River (South Island)

Location
- Country: New Zealand

Physical characteristics
- Source
  - coordinates: 44°55′33″S 167°35′45″E
- Mouth
  - location: Lake Te Anau
  - coordinates: 44°59′56″S 167°42′06″E

Basin features
- Progression: Glaisnock River → Narrows → North Fiord → Lake Te Anau → Waiau River → Foveaux Strait
- Tributaries
  - left: Taheke Creek, Kakapo Creek, Nitz Creek, Newton Creek
  - right: Midnight Creek, Henderson Burn

The Glaisnock River is a river in the Southland Region of New Zealand. It arises between the Stuart and Franklin Mountains, and flows east and south-east into the North Fiord of Lake Te Anau.

== See also ==
- List of rivers of New Zealand
