= Ross Tannock =

Scottish footballer

Personal information
- Date of birth: 30 August 1971 (age 55)
- Place of birth: Kilmarnock, Scotland
- Position: Midfielder

Senior career*
Years	Team	Apps	(Gls)
1989–1991	Motherwell	0	(0)
1991–1994	K.V. Oostende	6	
1994	Fort Lauderdale Strikers	20	
1994–1996	Ayr United	39	(4)
1996–1997	Albion Rovers	10	(0)
1997	Orlando Sundogs	5	(1)
2000	Palm Beach Pumas	5	
- * Club domestic league appearances and goals

Ross Tannock (born April 30, 1971 in Kilmarnock) is a Scottish retired footballer who currently lives in Florida.

Tannock played for Motherwell FC, K.V Oostende and Ayr United FC. In the spring of 1994, Tannock signed with the Fort Lauderdale Strikers of the American Professional Soccer League. Tannock left later in 1994. In 1997, Tannock signed with the Orlando Sundogs of the USISL. In 2000, he played for the Palm Beach Pumas. As late as 2002, he was still kicking in the Palm Beach amateur leagues.
