= Clifden Suspension Bridge =

Bridge in New Zealand

Coordinates: 46.030086°S 167.715075°E

The bridge looking southwest over the Waiau River

The Clifden Suspension Bridge is a historic suspension bridge near Clifden, New Zealand, with a single lane. Built in 1899, it spans the Waiau River and is 111.5 m long.

Designed by the Southland County Engineer C H Howarth, it is a fine example of a 19th-century solid vehicular suspension bridge, with high standard of civil, mechanical and bridge carpentry design. It still has its historic wooden decking and beams that were made from seasoned core totara wood. It was built during 1898-99 taking about ten months to complete and was opened on 5 April 1899 by Sir Joseph Ward.

The bridge is now accessible only to pedestrians since a two lane new concrete bridge was opened downstream in 1978. In April 2010 the bridge was closed to pedestrian traffic due to safety concerns outlined in a report commissioned by the New Zealand Historic Places Trust (now Heritage New Zealand), the organization that cares for the bridge. The safety issues were identified after a routine inspection of the bridge after an earthquake the previous year. After repairs, the bridge was re-opened to pedestrians in November 2013.

The bridge, constructed with twenty-seven steel cables attached to concrete pillars (clad to resemble stone pillars), still has its historic wooden decking. It is listed as a Category I Historic Place by Heritage New Zealand.

Design is somewhat similar to, but a much smaller version of the famous Clifton Suspension Bridge over the Avon Gorge of the river Avon in Bristol, Britain. Before the bridge was constructed, settlers depended on a ferry to get stock and supplies across the river which was always a challenging feat given the huge volume of gushing water of the river at that time.

This bridge should not be confused with the smaller Waiau Suspension Bridge on Lake Monowai Rd, upstream of this location.
