= Clifden, New Zealand =

Clifden
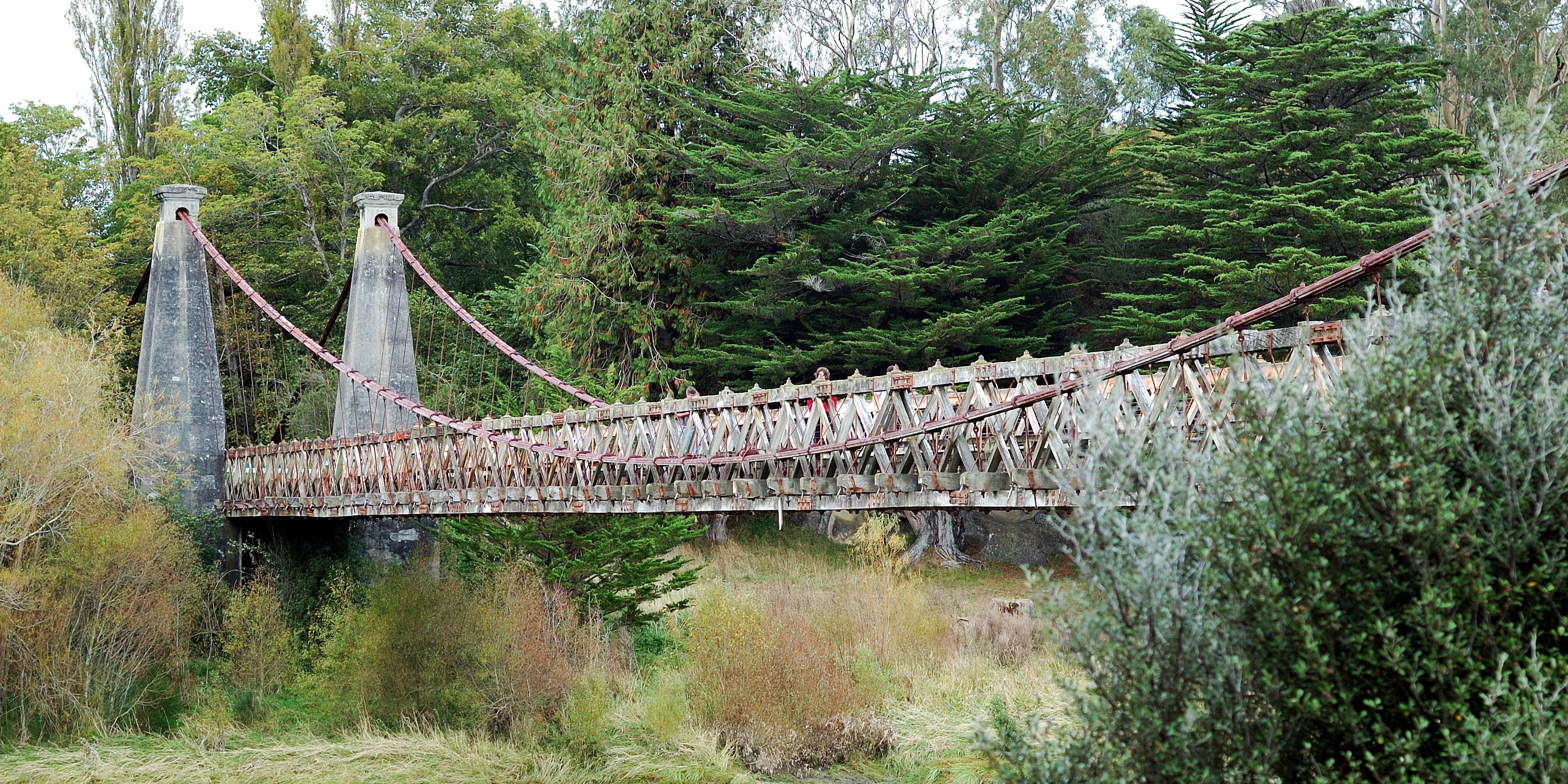
- Clifden Suspension Bridge

- Location within New Zealand
- Coordinates: 46°2′0″S 167°43′0″E
- Country: New Zealand
- Region: Southland
- Time zone: UTC+12:00 (NZST)
- Local iwi: Ngāi Tahu

Clifden, New Zealand is a small rural community on the Waiau River, Southland, New Zealand.

The Clifden Suspension Bridge, a government Category I historic site, features the Clifden war memorial, located near State Highway 99 north of Tuatapere. It contains the names of local soldiers who fought and died in World War I. The Clifden Limestone Caves has been a tourist attraction since early European settlement.

== Education ==
Hauroko Valley Primary School is a state contributing primary school with a roll of 74 as of July 2026. It expanded from Year 1 to 6, to Year 1 to 8, in 2017.
