= Wairaki River =

River in New Zealand

- Location within New Zealand
- Location: Southland, New Zealand
- Coordinates: 45.852°S 167.829°E

Wairaki River, Makarewa, or Mangarewa (all names unofficial), is a river in Southland, New Zealand. The name Wairaki literally translates to water (wai), north (raki), and also means "meandering river".
