= David Tannock =

New Zealand horticulturist (1873–1952)

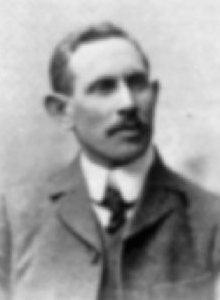
Tannock, c. 1905

David Tannock OBE (1873–1952) was a New Zealand horticulturist, landscape architect, superintendent of reserves and silviculturist. He was born in Tarbolton, Ayrshire, Scotland, in 1873.

In the 1948 King's Birthday Honours, Tannock was appointed an Officer of the Order of the British Empire for services to horticulture.
