= Upukerora River =

Coordinates: 45.396°S 167.7413°E

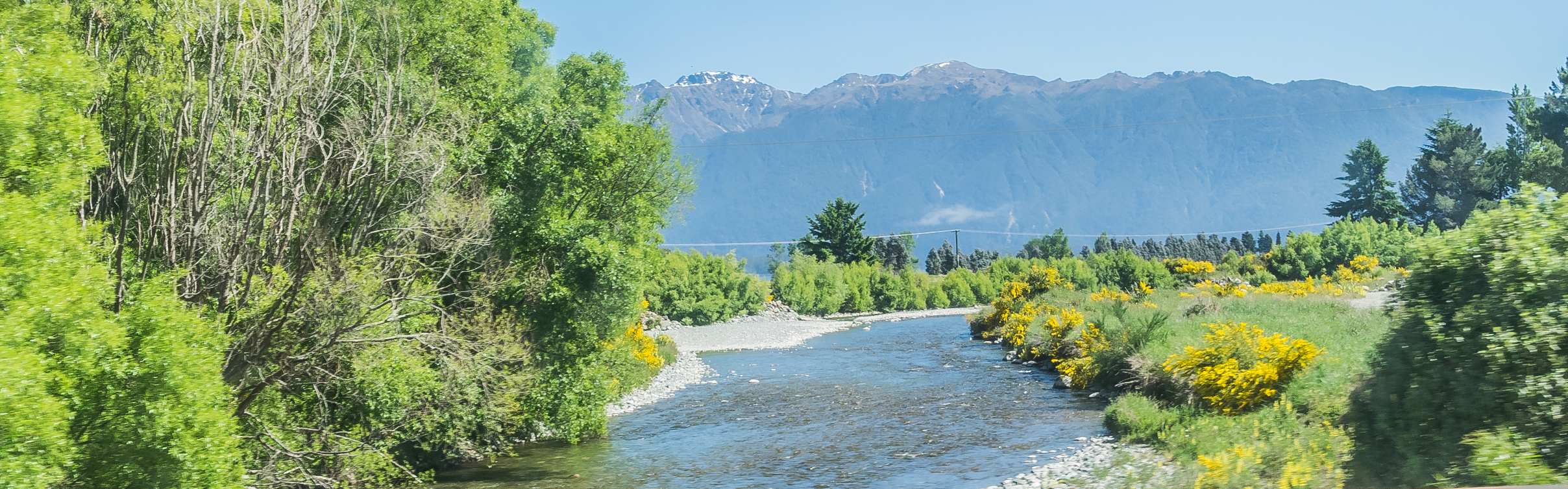

Location
- Country: New Zealand

The Upukerora River is a river in New Zealand, flowing into Lake Te Anau north of Te Anau township.

== History ==
The name Upukerora River is derived from a variation of the Māori name for the New Zealand trout pike, which is known as Upokororo in the Māori language. However, the Māori refer to the river as Marakura.

== See also ==
- List of rivers of New Zealand
