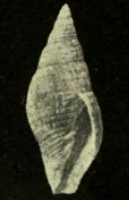
- Shell of Vexillum eusulcatum (holotype)

Scientific classification
- Kingdom: Animalia
- Phylum: Mollusca
- Class: Gastropoda
- Subclass: Caenogastropoda
- Order: Neogastropoda
- Superfamily: Turbinelloidea
- Family: Costellariidae
- Genus: Vexillum
- Species: †V. eusulcatum

Binomial name
- †Vexillum eusulcatum (Finlay, 1924)

Synonyms
- † Costellaria eusulcata (Finlay, 1924); † Mitra eusulcata Finlay, 1924

= Vexillum eusulcatum =

Extinct species of gastropod

Vexillum eusulcatum is an extinct species of sea snail, a marine gastropod mollusk, in the family Costellariidae, the ribbed miters.

== Description ==
The length of the shell attains 16.5 mm, its diameter 6 mm.

(Original description) The shell is narrowly biconic, rather thin. The protoconch consists of 3·½ smooth whorls, high, regularly coiled, bluntly pointed, and not distinctly marked off from brephic stage. The first whorl shows 3, following whorls with 4, subequal spirals, increasing, through grooving of main ribs, to 8 unequal ribs on penultimate whorl. The body whorl has about 24 unequal spirals, a few of which are grooved medially. The ribs are low and flattish, with much narrower interstices, finer and wider apart near beak. There is no axial sculpture. The punctures in the interstices seem also to be absent, but as both shells are slightly worn this cannot be determined for certain. The spire is acutely conical, lower than the aperture, the outlines are straight, very slightly scalar. The shell contains about 9 whorls, flat and regularly increasing. The body whorl is bluntly angled at its periphery, thence tapering quickly to the beak. The suture is straight, slightly oblique. Whorls worn in its neighbourhood so that it seems slightly subcanaliculate. It is also uncertain whether it is margined. The aperture is slightly oblique, long and narrow, slightly channelled above, with short open and truncated siphonal canal below. The outer lip is convex, acute, smooth within. The columella is subvertical, slightly twisted below, with 3 plaits in young shell, 4 in larger specimen; the plaits rapidly decrease in strength anteriorly, the last being very weak, they are truncated by the edge of the inner lip, which also stops the spiral sculpture. The fasciole is fairly distinct.

== Distribution ==
Fossils from this marine species were found in Southland, New Zealand.
