= John Laughton (missionary) =

Scottish missionary (1891–1965)

John George Laughton CMG (2 December 1891 – 3 July 1965) was a New Zealand Presbyterian missionary. He was born in the parish of Holm in Orkney, Scotland, on 2 December 1891.

In the 1948 King's Birthday Honours, Laughton was appointed a Companion of the Order of St Michael and St George, in recognition of his service as a member of the Māori Mission Department of the Presbyterian Church.
