= Amy Hutchinson (reformer) =

New Zealand maternity reformer

Amy May Hutchinson MBE (née Scott, 2 July 1888 – 11 June 1985) was a New Zealand maternity reformer. She was born in London, England, on 2 July 1888.

In the 1948 King's Birthday Honours, Hutchinson was appointed a Member of the Order of the British Empire in recognition of her role as secretary of the Auckland branch of the Society for the Protection of Women and Children.
