= Monowai River =

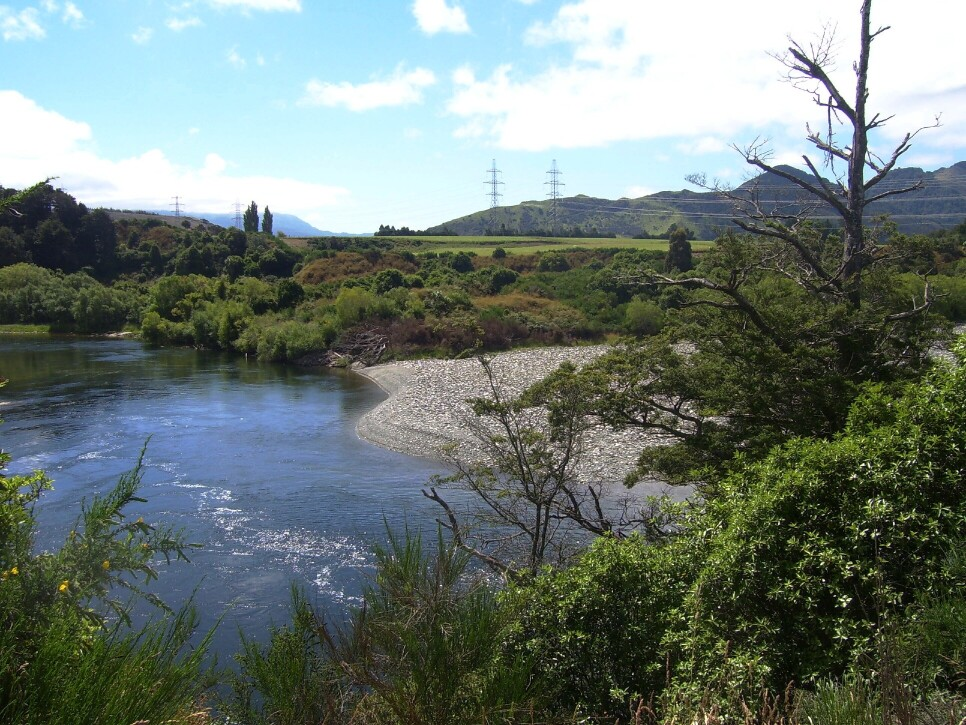
- Route of the Monowai River
- Mouth of the Monowai River Monowai River (South Island) Monowai River (New Zealand)

Location
- Country: New Zealand

Physical characteristics
- Source
  - location: Lake Monowai
  - coordinates: 45°48′40″S 167°31′27″E
  - elevation: 180 m (590 ft)
- Mouth
  - coordinates: 45°46′32″S 167°37′00″E

Basin features
- Progression: Monowai River → Waiau River → Foveaux Strait

The Monowai River is a river in New Zealand, draining Lake Monowai into the Waiau River and feeding the Monowai Power Station.

== See also ==
- List of rivers of New Zealand
