= Frederick Kissel =

New Zealand engineer and engineering administrator (1881–1962)

Frederick Templeton Manheim Kissel ISO (27 March 1881 – 15 July 1962) was a New Zealand engineer and engineering administrator. He was born in Templeton, New Zealand, on 27 March 1881.

In the 1948 King's Birthday Honours, Kissel was appointed a Companion of the Imperial Service Order.
