= Lake Monowai =

Lake in Southland Region, New Zealand

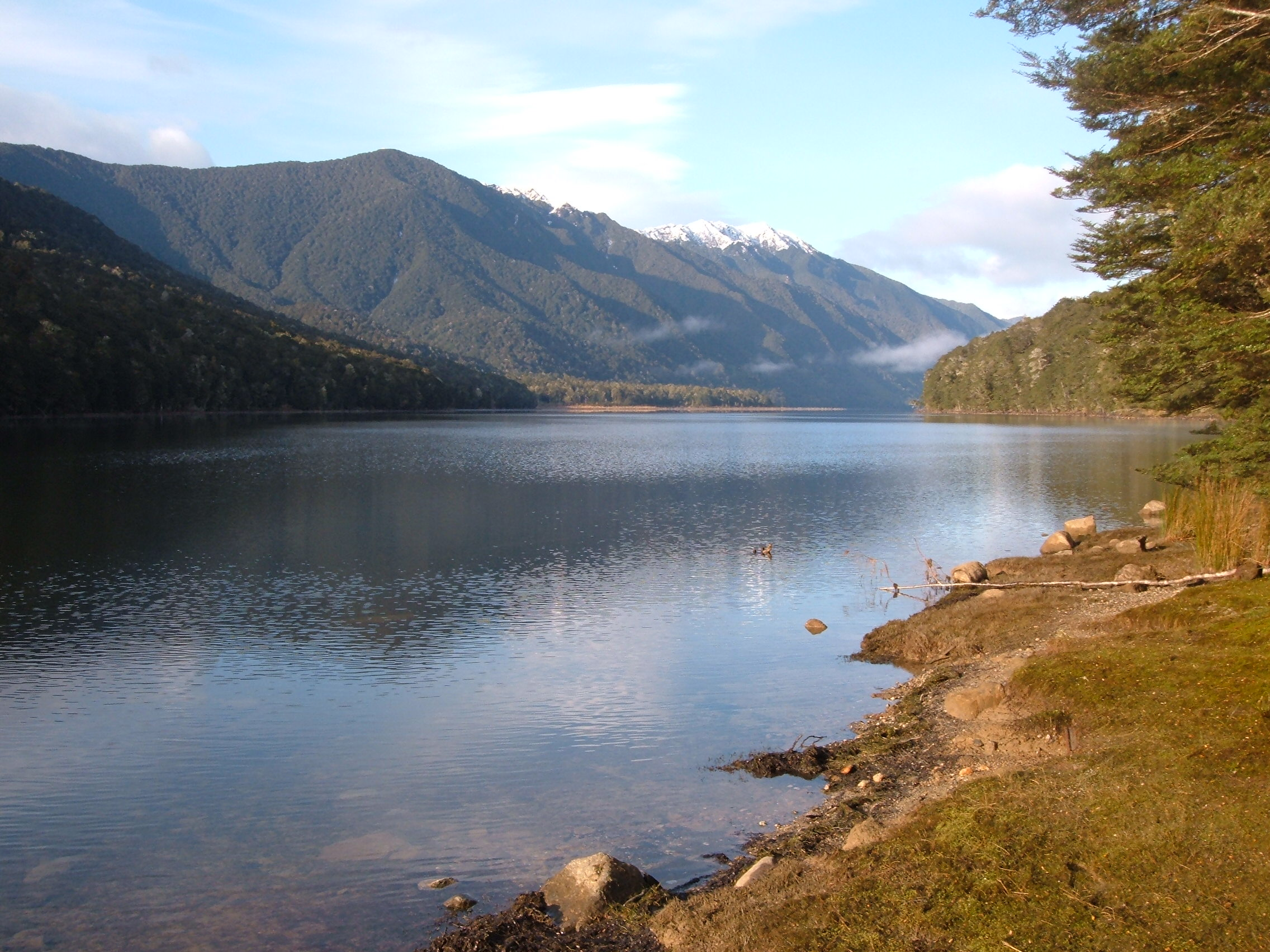
- Lake Monowai

- Location within New Zealand Location within South Island
- Interactive map of Lake Monowai
- Location: Southland District, Southland Region, South Island
- Coordinates: 45°52′S 167°27′E
- Primary outflows: Monowai River
- Basin countries: New Zealand
- Max. length: 19 km (12 mi)
- Max. width: 1.6 km (0.99 mi)
- Surface area: 31 km^{2} (12 sq mi)
- Average depth: 71 m (233 ft)
- Max. depth: 158.5 m (520 ft)
- Water volume: 2.2 km^{3} (0.53 cu mi)
- Surface elevation: 196 m (643 ft)

Lake Monowai (officially Monowai Lake; Māori: Manokīwai) is a large lake (31 square kilometres or 12 square miles) in the southern part of Fiordland National Park, in New Zealand's South Island, 120 kilometres northwest of Invercargill. At an altitude of 196 metres in a long curved valley, the lake appears on maps shaped like a letter "U". The western part of the lake is set in beautiful mountainous country. It is drained in the northeast by the short Monowai River, which enters the Waiau River eight kilometres to the northeast.

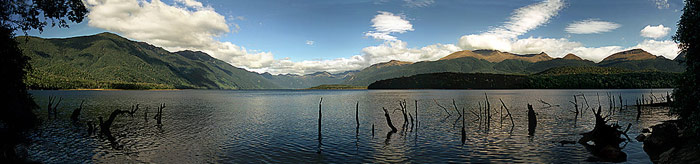
Lake Monowai panorama

== Power station ==
One of the South Island's oldest hydroelectric stations is powered by the waters of the Monowai. It is located at the junction of the Waiau and Monowai Rivers and was opened in 1925.

As a result of the Save Manapouri campaign, plans to raise the level of the lake to create more hydroelectric power were shelved by the Labour government of Norman Kirk in the 1970s, and an independent body, the Guardians of Lake Manapouri, Monowai, and Te Anau was created to oversee management of the lake levels (more information at Manapouri Power Station).
