= Lesley Cantwell =

New Zealand racewalker (1987–2013

Personal information
- Born: Lesley Judith Cantwell; 22 February 1987 Te Anau, New Zealand
- Died: 7 June 2013 (aged 26) Papeete, French Polynesia

Sport
- Country: New Zealand
- Sport: Racewalking
Medal record
Women's athletics
Representing New Zealand
Oceania Championships
Gold medal – first place	2013 Papeete	5000 m

Lesley Judith Cantwell (22 February 1987 – 7 June 2013) was a New Zealand racewalker. Cantwell won the gold medal in the women's 5000 m road walk at the 2013 Oceania Athletics Championships in Tahiti on 4 June 2013. While waiting for the medal ceremony, she felt unwell and collapsed. She was taken to a local hospital where she died three days later. Cantwell died on 7 June 2013, aged 26, from a suspected subarachnoid haemorrhage.

Cantwell was born in Te Anau on 22 February 1987, and was educated at Fiordland College. Her father, Shaun Cantwell, coached athletics and taught at Fiordland College. Her mother, Judith Cantwell, also an athlete, won the New Zealand national 1500 metres title in 1989.
