= Te Anau Aerodrome =

Former airport in New Zealand

Te Anau aerodrome
- IATA: none; ICAO: none

Summary
- Location: Te Anau, New Zealand
- Opened: 1940s
- Closed: 2010
- Built: 1940s
- Coordinates: 45°27′43″S 167°42′01″E
- Interactive map of Te Anau aerodrome

Te Anau Aerodrome was established in the 1940s, located beside State Highway 95 just south of the lakeside town. A compacted grass strip of approximately 800m long allowed light aircraft to land. Amphibian aircraft that serviced the lake also used the small airport if weather conditions on the lake were unfavourable. The site was considered too restrictive for larger aircraft to land.

A large powerstation project in the 1960s at nearby Lake Manapouri saw a new paved strip built 12 km to the south of Te Anau to service the work force. This airport was owned by Mount Cook Airline and was used for their services into the region.

Te Anau Aerodrome continued to be used as the local airport with flightseeing, aerial topdressing, and helicopter operations based there. The airport was managed by the Southland District Council.

In 2006 the larger Manapouri airport was sold to the Southland District Council, and as this was considered a far better facility, was developed into a full jet capable airport in 2010 and rebranded Manapouri/Te Anau Airport.

The Te Anau Aerodrome was closed to the public accordingly and the runway 'disabled' with large 'X' crosses and bollards placed on it. It has since been sold into private hands and obliterated.
