= Lake Fergus =

Lake in the South Island of New Zealand

- Pupapa
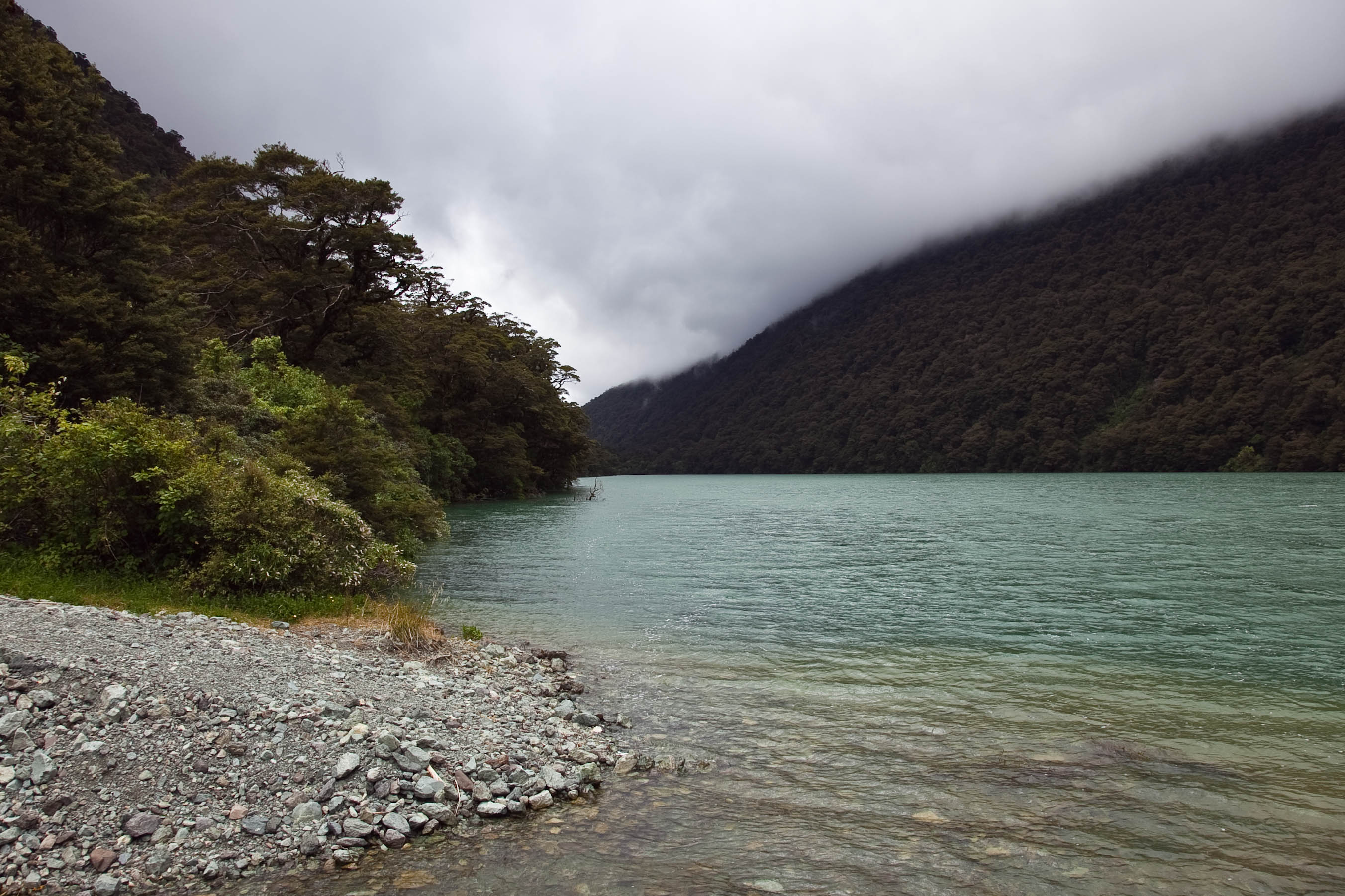
- Lake Fergus in 2011

- Location within Fiordland
- Interactive map of Lake Fergus
- Location: Fiordland National Park
- Coordinates: 44°50′42″S 168°6′40″E
- Etymology: named after Thomas Fergus
- Primary outflows: Eglinton River West Branch
- Max. length: 2.4 kilometres (1.5 mi)
- Max. width: 330 metres (1,080 ft)
- Surface area: 53.4 hectares (132 acres)
- Surface elevation: 483 metres (1,585 ft)

Lake Fergus (Māori: Pupapa) is a lake in the South Island of New Zealand, located in northeastern Fiordland National Park.

== Geography ==
A small lake between Lake Te Anau and Milford Sound, it lies adjacent to the State Highway 94 (SH94; the Milford Sound Road). The lake is within the boundary of the Fiordland National Park, and is surrounded by native bush. The west branch of the Eglinton River flows through the lake, and it drains into Lake Gunn located south of it.

== History ==
The first Europeans to explore the valley were David McKellar and George Gunn in 1861, two runholders from Southland. William H. Homer (after whom the Homer Tunnel is named) and George Barber explored the area in search of a route from Lake Wakatipu to Milford Sound in 1889, setting off from Glenorchy and travelling via the Greenstone Valley. They saw the lake on 4 January, named it after Thomas Fergus, the Member of Parliament for the Wakatipu electorate at the time, and left the following inscription in a log:

This lake was seen and named on January 4th, 1889, 'Lake Fergus', by W. H. Homer and G. Barber.

On this journey, the explorers found what they called the Homer Saddle on 27 January. Homer suggested that a tunnel through the saddle would provide access to the Milford area. The Eglington Valley Road past Lake Fergus, now known as SH94, was completed in 1935, giving easy access to the lake for the first time. The Homer Tunnel opened to traffic in 1953, giving visitors reason to drive past Lake Fergus.
