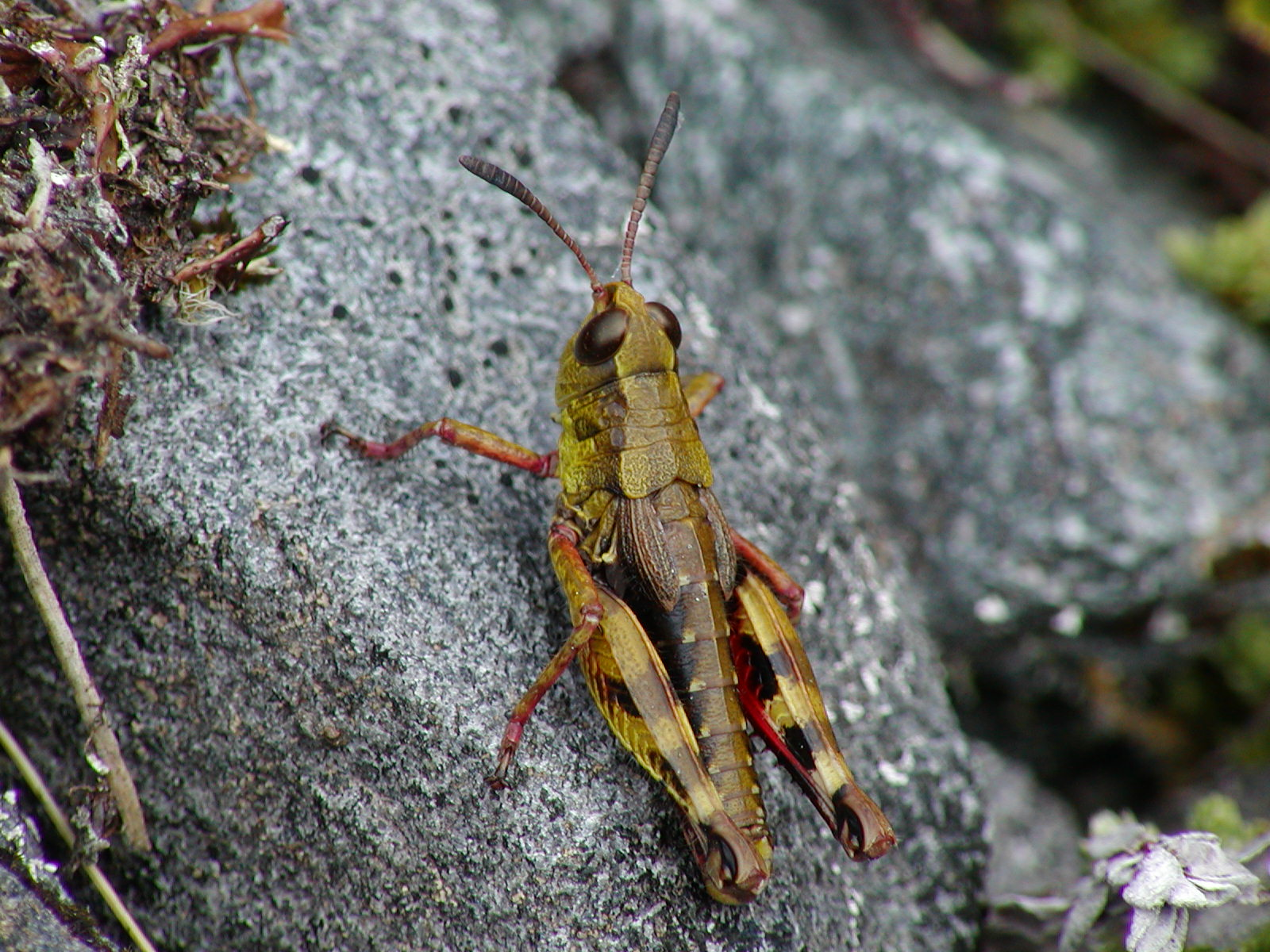
- A male Sigaus homerensis

Scientific classification
- Kingdom: Animalia
- Phylum: Arthropoda
- Clade: Pancrustacea
- Class: Insecta
- Order: Orthoptera
- Suborder: Caelifera
- Family: Acrididae
- Genus: Sigaus
- Species: S. homerensis

Binomial name
- Sigaus homerensis Morris, 2003
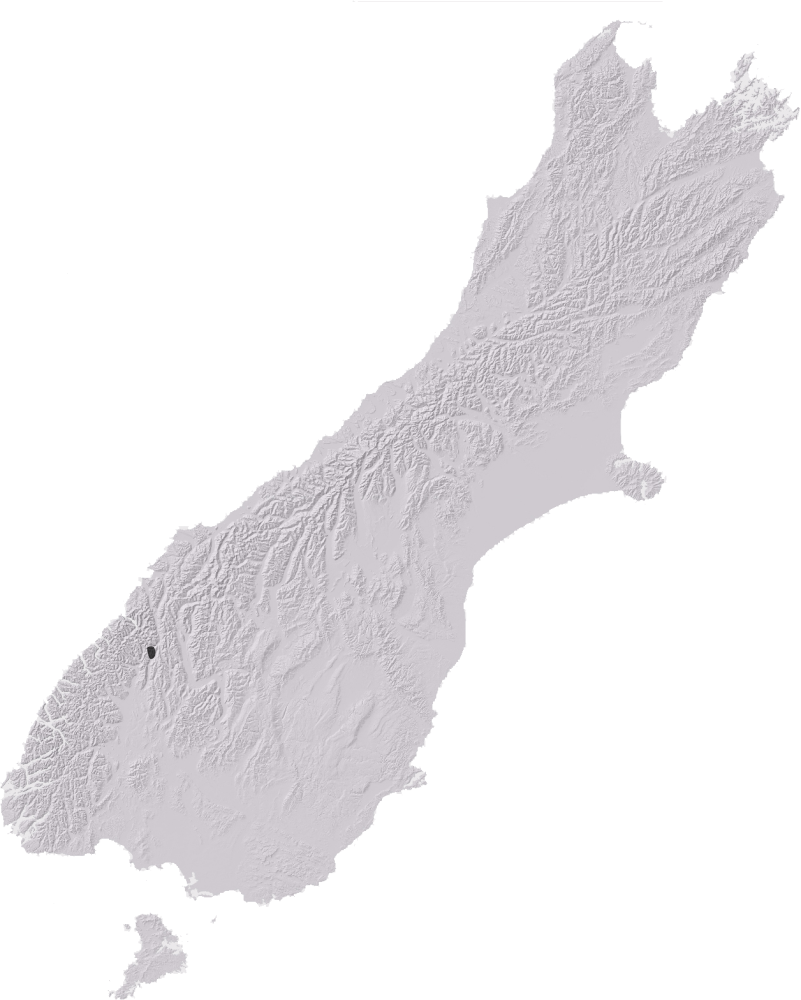
- The distribution of S. homerensis in New Zealand

= Sigaus homerensis =

Homer grasshopper

Species of grasshopper

Sigaus homerensis is a grasshopper endemic to the southern South Island of New Zealand. It is known only from three isolated populations in Fiordland.

== Distribution and habitat ==
The distribution of S. homerensis is not known to overlap with that of any other grasshopper species and it is known only from the Earl Mountains. S. homerensis is one of three known alpine grasshoppers found in Fiordland, the other species being Alpinacris tumidicauda and Sigaus takahe. Known sites of S. homerensis are regularly swept clear of tall plants by avalanches, making these areas more sparsely vegetated than the surrounding. Similar terrain and vegetation is found outside the known distribution, however, S. homerensis are not found in these areas. A possible explanation of this could be associated with avalanches, vegetation height and sunshine hours. This region receives high rainfall (about 8000 mm/year) coupled with the lowest sunshine hours in New Zealand (1400 to 1600 h/year). It appears that these small cleared areas are better for S. homerensis than avalanche-free areas with their taller vegetation. New Zealand Acrididae are diurnal sun-baskers and require basking surface to become active for the day. S. homerensis prefer altitudes between 900–1,000 metres (3,000–3,300 ft), however, it can be found as low as 639 metres (2,096 ft) and as high as 1,257 metres (4,124 ft).

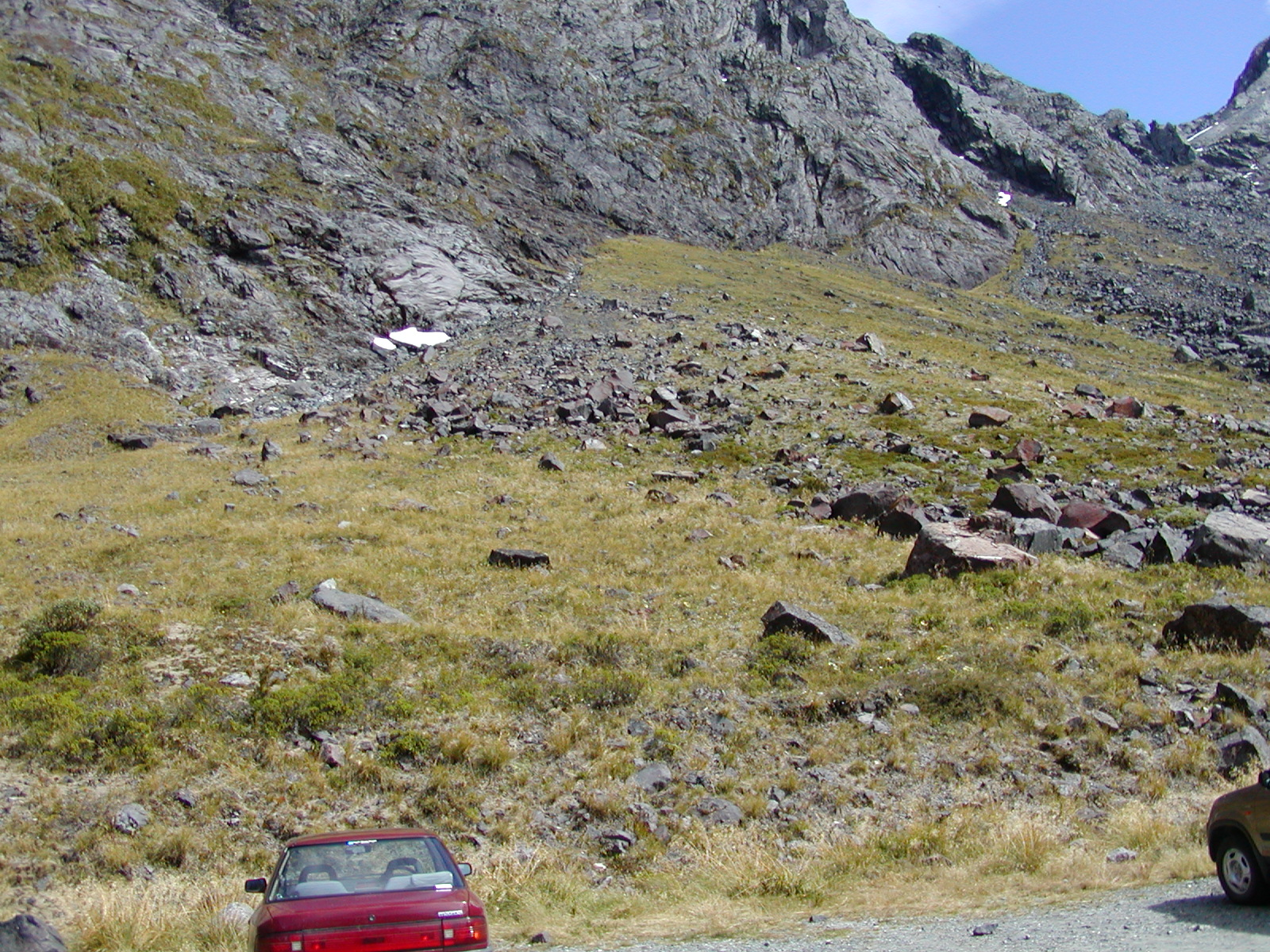
A overview of the S. homerensis habitat.

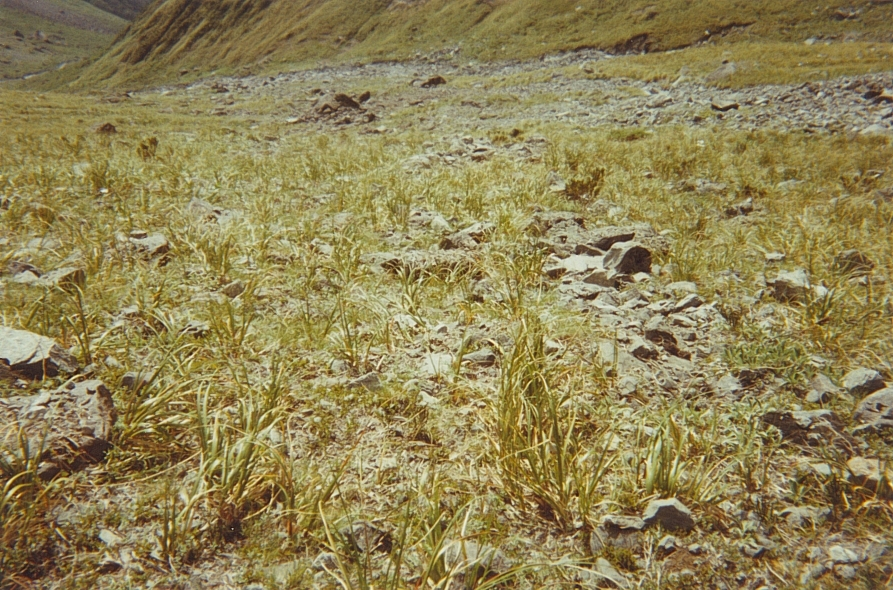
A closeup view of the S. homerensis habitat.

== Species description ==
The wings on S. homerensis are micropterous (small wings) between 2–4 millimetres (0.079–0.157 in) making this species flightless like most of New Zealand grasshoppers. Male body length 19–21 millimetres (0.75–0.83 in); Female body length 28–38 millimetres (1.1–1.5 in).

== Type information ==
- Morris, S.J. 2003: Two new species of Sigaus from Fiordland, New Zealand (Orthoptera: Acrididae). New Zealand entomologist, 26: 65–74. PDF
- Type locality: Homer Tunnel, 1,052 metres (3,451 ft), Fiordland. 45°12′35″S 169°29′26″E
- Type specimen: Male; 28 February 2003; Simon J Morris; Holotype is deposited in the Canterbury Museum, Christchurch and Paratype are deposited in the Canterbury Museum, Christchurch and Otago Museum, Dunedin.

== Polymorphism ==
Two colour morphs are known for adults S. homerensis, 'Drab gold' and 'Dark blue-grey'. Approximately two-thirds of the adults S. homerensis are of the 'Drab Gold' colour morph.

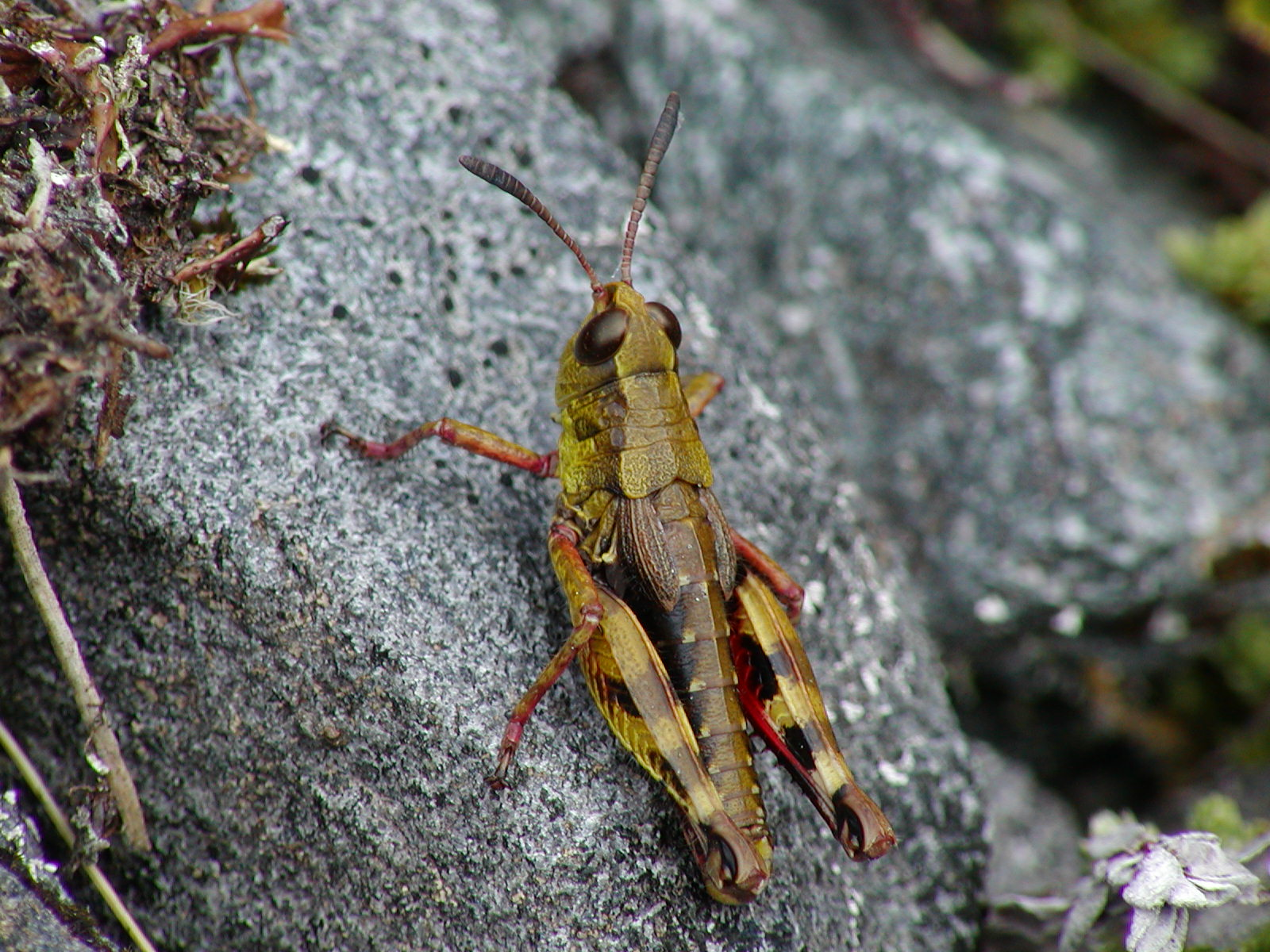
Colour morphs 'Drab gold'.

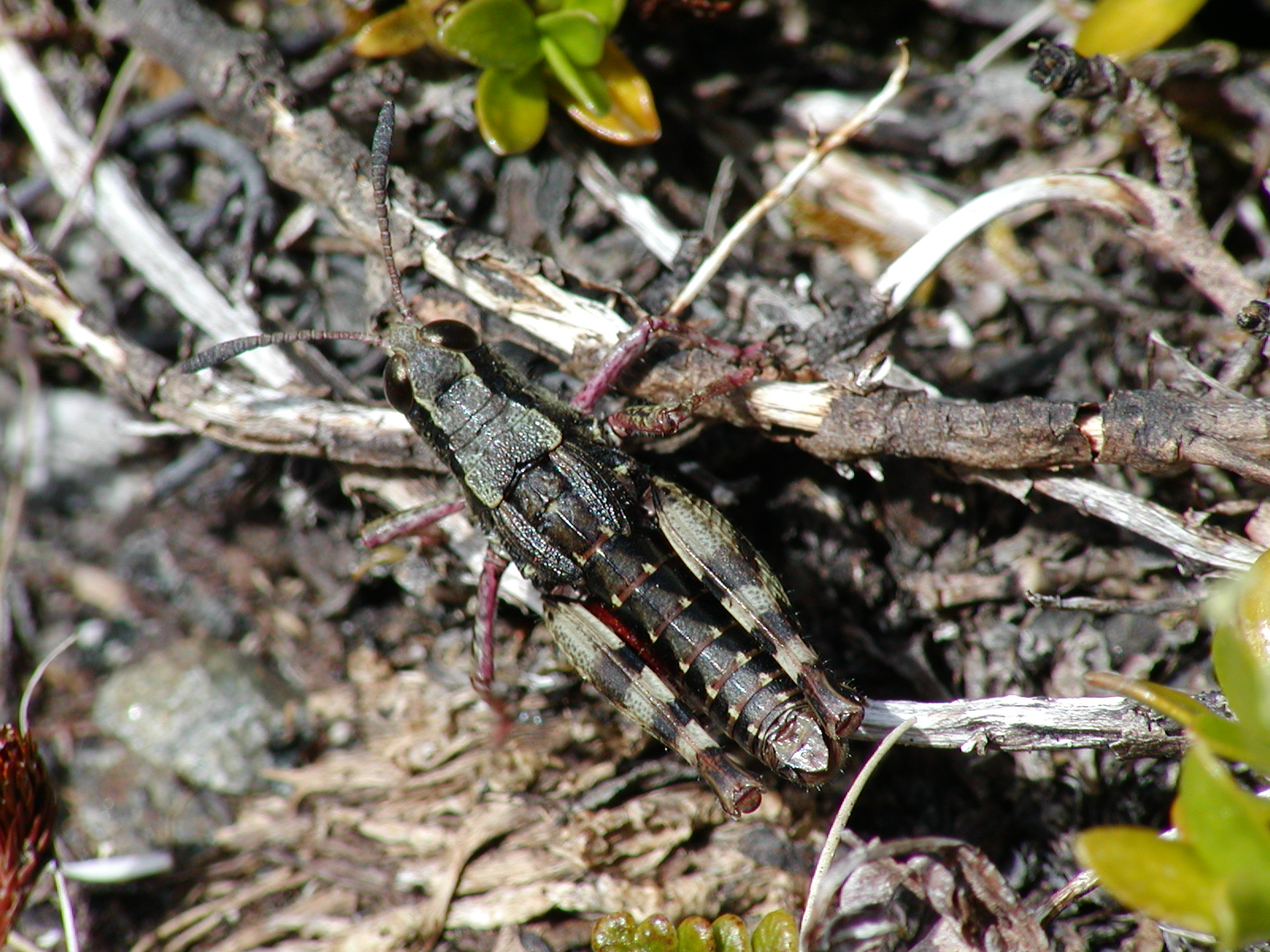
Colour morphs 'Dark blue-grey'.
