= Mirror Lakes =

Set of lakes in New Zealand

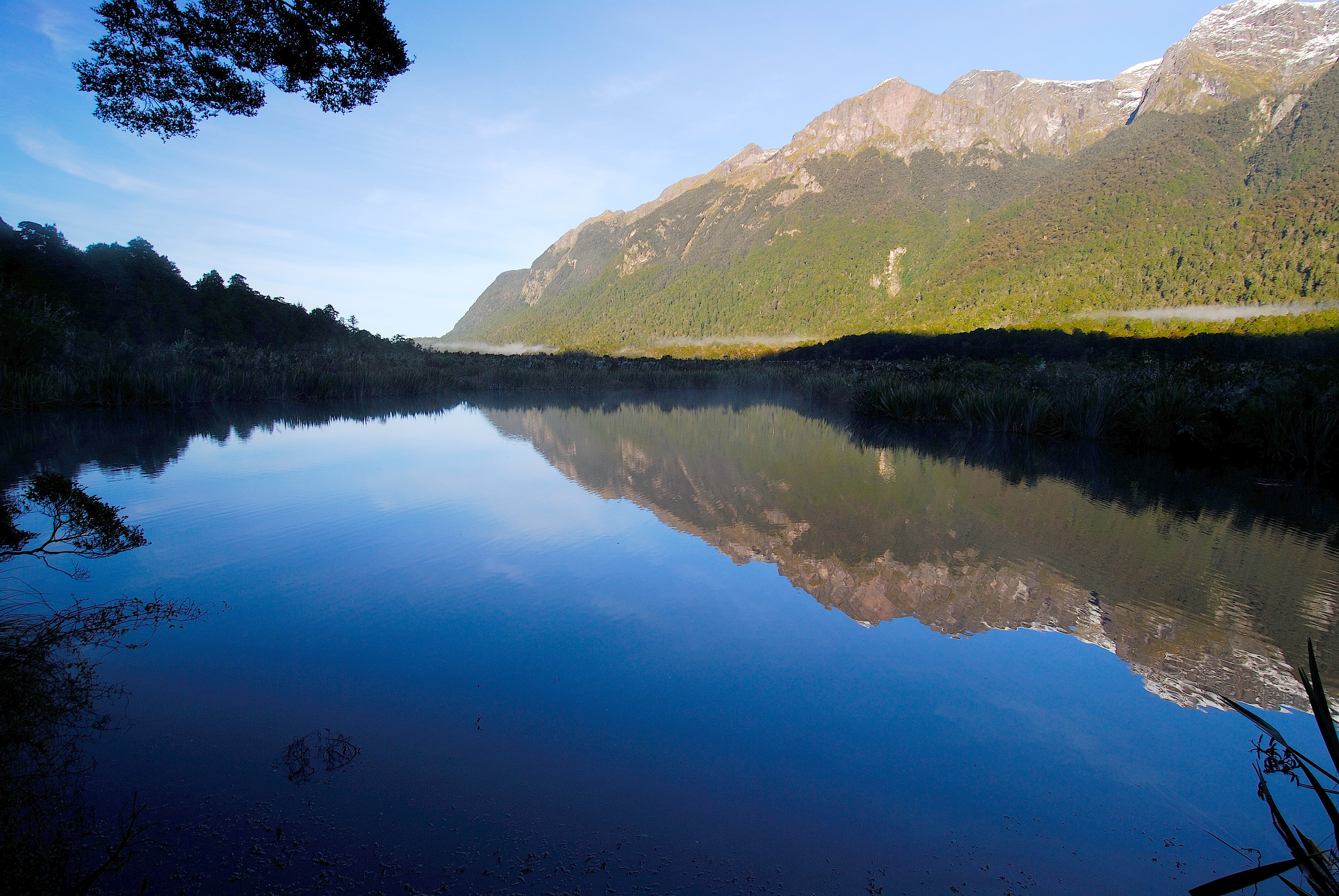
- Mirror Lakes

- Location within New Zealand
- Coordinates: 45°01′43″S 168°00′39″E

Mirror Lakes are a set of lakes lying north of Lake Te Anau and immediately to the west of the road from Te Anau to Milford Sound in New Zealand.

At 56 kilometres (35 mi) north of Te Anau, the lakes are about halfway to Milford Sound and the car park right next to State Highway 94 is a popular stop for tour buses on route to Milford Sound.

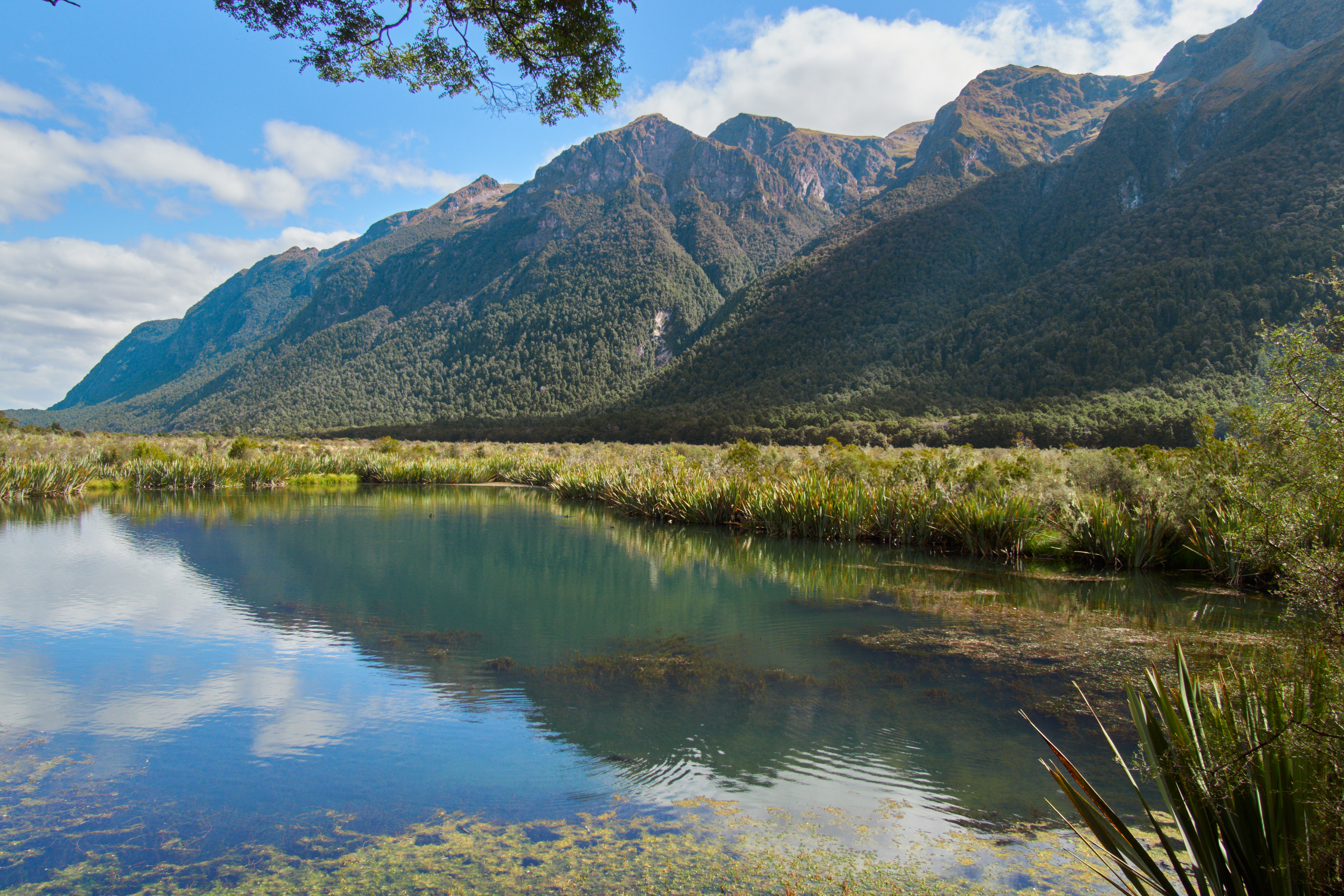
Mirror Lakes reflect the Earl Mountains

The lakes are only a 5-minute walk away from the car park along a wheelchair-friendly boardwalk. A wooden viewing platform and short walking track run along the lakes, one of which has a deliberately mirrored sign mounted just above the water's surface, so that the name "Mirror Lakes" is shown correctly in its reflection. On a calm day, Mount Eglinton and the Earl Mountains can be seen reflected in the water.
