= Mararoa =

Rural area in Southland, New Zealand

- Interactive map of Mararoa
- Coordinates: 45.545°S 167.893°E
- Country: New Zealand
- Island: South Island
- Region: Southland region
- Territorial authorities of New Zealand: Southland District
- Ward: Mararoa Waimea Ward
- Community: Fiordland Community
- Electorates: Southland; Te Tai Tonga (Māori)

Government
  - Territorial authority: Southland District Council
  - Regional council: Southland Regional Council
  - Mayor of Southland: Rob Scott
  - Southland MP: Joseph Mooney
  - Te Tai Tonga MP: Tākuta Ferris

Area
  - Total: 2,717.39 km^{2} (1,049.19 sq mi)

Population (June 2025)
  - Total: 890
  - Density: 0.33/km^{2} (0.85/sq mi)
- Local iwi: Ngāi Tahu

Mararoa is a rural area in New Zealand's Southland District. The area broadly corresponds to the course of the Mararoa River and the eastern part of Te Anau Basin, and includes the Mavora Lakes and the settlement of Manapouri.

The local primary school is located at The Key, at the intersection of State Highway 94, the Southern Scenic Route and the Mararoa River.

== Demographics ==
The Mararoa statistical area covers 2,717.39 km^{2} (1,049.19 sq mi) and had an estimated population of 890 as of June 2025, with a population density of 0.33 people per km^{2}.

Historical population
Year	Pop.	±% p.a.
2006	789	—
2013	714	−1.42%
2018	774	+1.63%

Mararoa had a population of 774 at the 2018 New Zealand census, an increase of 60 people (8.4%) since the 2013 census, and a decrease of 15 people (−1.9%) since the 2006 census. There were 309 households, comprising 402 males and 375 females, giving a sex ratio of 1.07 males per female. The median age was 44.2 years (compared with 37.4 years nationally), with 138 people (17.8%) aged under 15 years, 123 (15.9%) aged 15 to 29, 402 (51.9%) aged 30 to 64, and 108 (14.0%) aged 65 or older.

Ethnicities were 95.0% European/Pākehā, 9.3% Māori, 0.8% Asian, and 1.9% other ethnicities. People may identify with more than one ethnicity.

The percentage of people born overseas was 13.6, compared with 27.1% nationally.

Although some people chose not to answer the census's question about religious affiliation, 60.5% had no religion, 30.6% were Christian, 0.4% were Hindu, 0.4% were Buddhist and 1.9% had other religions.

Of those at least 15 years old, 105 (16.5%) people had a bachelor's or higher degree, and 111 (17.5%) people had no formal qualifications. The median income was $37,800, compared with $31,800 nationally. 93 people (14.6%) earned over $70,000 compared to 17.2% nationally. The employment status of those at least 15 was that 405 (63.7%) people were employed full-time, 117 (18.4%) were part-time, and 3 (0.5%) were unemployed.

== Education ==
Mararoa School is a full primary school serving years 1 to 8 with a roll of 28 students as of July 2026. It opened in 1914.
