= State Highway 94 (New Zealand) =

Road in New Zealand

State Highway 94

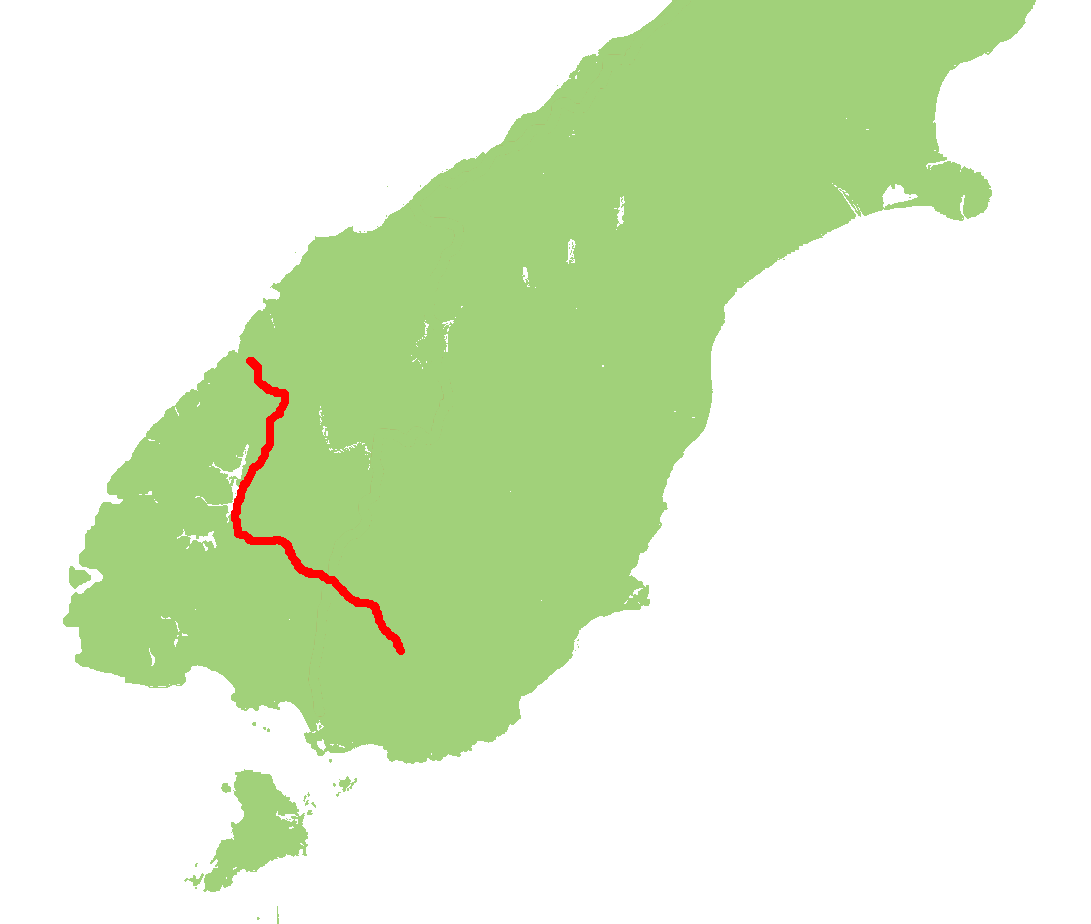

Route information
- Maintained by NZ Transport Agency Waka Kotahi
- Length: 254.4 km (158.1 mi)
- Tourist routes: Southern Scenic Route between Mossburn and Te Anau

Major junctions
- Southeast end: SH 1 (Main Street/Hokonui Drive) at Gore
- Northwest end: Milford Sound

Location
- Country: New Zealand
- Primary destinations: Riversdale, Lumsden, Mossburn, Te Anau, Homer Tunnel

Highway system
- New Zealand state highways; Motorways and expressways; List
← SH 93	→ SH 95

State Highway 94 is a New Zealand state highway connecting the large Southland town of Gore with one of New Zealand's most popular destinations, Milford Sound. It also passes the significant townships of Lumsden and Te Anau as well going through the Homer Tunnel (in this area it is also called the 'Milford Road', with the section from Te Anau up to the Sound being 119 kilometres or 74 miles). The road also goes through Fiordland and crosses the Main Divide of the Southern Alps.

It is regarded as one of the most scenic roads in New Zealand, and with a peak elevation of 940 metres (3,080 ft), the country's third highest highway after the Desert Road (SH 1) and the Lindis Pass (SH 8). However, the "Milford Road" part is also one of the more dangerous public roads in New Zealand, with injury crash rates around 65% higher than the rest of New Zealand's network, and a fatality crash rate of almost twice average (per vehicle kilometre travelled), making it the third most dangerous section of New Zealand's State Highway network (as of 2008).

== History ==
The road alignment was first surveyed in 1890 by London-born engineer Robert Holmes, who later became the Engineer-in-Chief of the Public Works Department. Holmes initially preferred a route starting at Lake Wakatipu and running northwest, but the decision was instead made to start from Te Anau.

However, the project then languished in planning for 40 years, possibly because in 1889 road building had been removed from the brief of the Public Works Department, and only reinstated with much more limited authority in 1909. It took until 1935 to construct a rough road to the entrance of what would become Homer Tunnel. The tunnel itself was excavated by pick and shovel, mostly by workers directed there by the government during the Great Depression. Life for the workers was harsh, and avalanches claimed some lives in the mid 1930s. While the breakthrough was achieved in February 1940, the labour shortage caused by World War II caused significant delays, and it was not until 1953 that the tunnel was finally completed.

Long stretches of Milford Road, including the tunnel, remained gravel-surfaced until the 1980s. Improvements to the Homer Tunnel portals are ongoing and remain on the NZ Transport Agency's plans, with the aim of reducing closures of this important tourist route. The latest construction project to minimise the impact of avalanches was an extension of the western tunnel entrance portal.

== Route ==
As of 2020, this is the route SH 94 takes.

=== Gore to Te Anau ===
In Gore, SH 94 begins as Hokonui Drive and passes through the northern parts of Gore. Outside of Gore, the highway changes name to Waimea Highway and passes to the north of the Hokonui Hills, a place historically known for illicit moonshine distilling. On the other side of the hills lies Mandeville. The road then veers right and bisects the Waimea Plains to pass through the settlements of Riversdale (where the road names changes to Newcastle Street and then Lumsden Riversdale Highway once leaving the town) and Balfour. The road proceeds in a northwesterly direction to arrive in Lumsden (where it changes name to Flora Road).

From Lumsden, as Flora Road and Five Rivers Lumsden Highway, SH 94 merges with SH 6 and runs concurrently with SH 6 towards Queenstown for 2.5 kilometres between the Ōreti River and the hills to the east before turning left to cross the river and back onto the plains as Mossburn Lumsden Highway. The road runs for a further 20 km towards Mossburn, the self-proclaimed deer capital of New Zealand (name change to Devon Street). Tourist traffic from Queenstown turn onto SH 94 here from SH 97. Beyond Mossburn, the road changes name to Te Anau Mossburn Highway, and runs underneath a terrace carved by the Ōreti River to the north before passing through more arable farmland and the turnoff to go to Mavora Lakes, one of the locations used in The Lord of the Rings film trilogy. After the turnoff, the road heads into the hills and passes through undulating tussocklands and valleys before emerging back onto the plains at The Key. From The Key, the road proceeds on a more-or-less north-westerly direction across the plains before arriving at the lakeside resort of Te Anau.

=== Te Anau to Milford Sound – The Milford Road ===
In Te Anau, the road changes name to Luxmore Drive as it proceeds towards the town centre. Once there, the road swings to the right and becomes Milford Road, once outside the town limits the road changes name to Te Anau Milford Highway. The road then hugs the shoreline of Lake Te Anau for about 29 km, skirting the edge of the Fiordland National Park until it reaches Te Anau Downs. From Te Anau Downs, the road veers right and joins the Eglinton Valley. The road then enters the national park (45 km north of Te Anau) and runs parallel to the right side of the Eglinton River for 33 km while it passes through Knobs Flat. A car park at the Mirror Lakes on the northbound side is a popular stopping point for tour buses, as it is roughly halfway between Te Anau and Milford Sound.

At Cascade Creek, the closest camping ground to Milford Sound, the road emerges onto the shorelines of Lake Gunn and Lake Fergus. The road then passes through a saddle at "The Divide", where a car park is situated at the end of the Routeburn Track. The Divide marks the line of the Southern Alps' drainage divide between the west coast and the east coast, which at this point is at an altitude of only 532 metres (1,745 ft). Following that pass, Milford Road emerges at the upper section of the Hollyford Valley and after turning west descends into that valley to the turn-off point to the Lower Hollyford Road, a gravel road leading north to the start of the Hollyford Track.

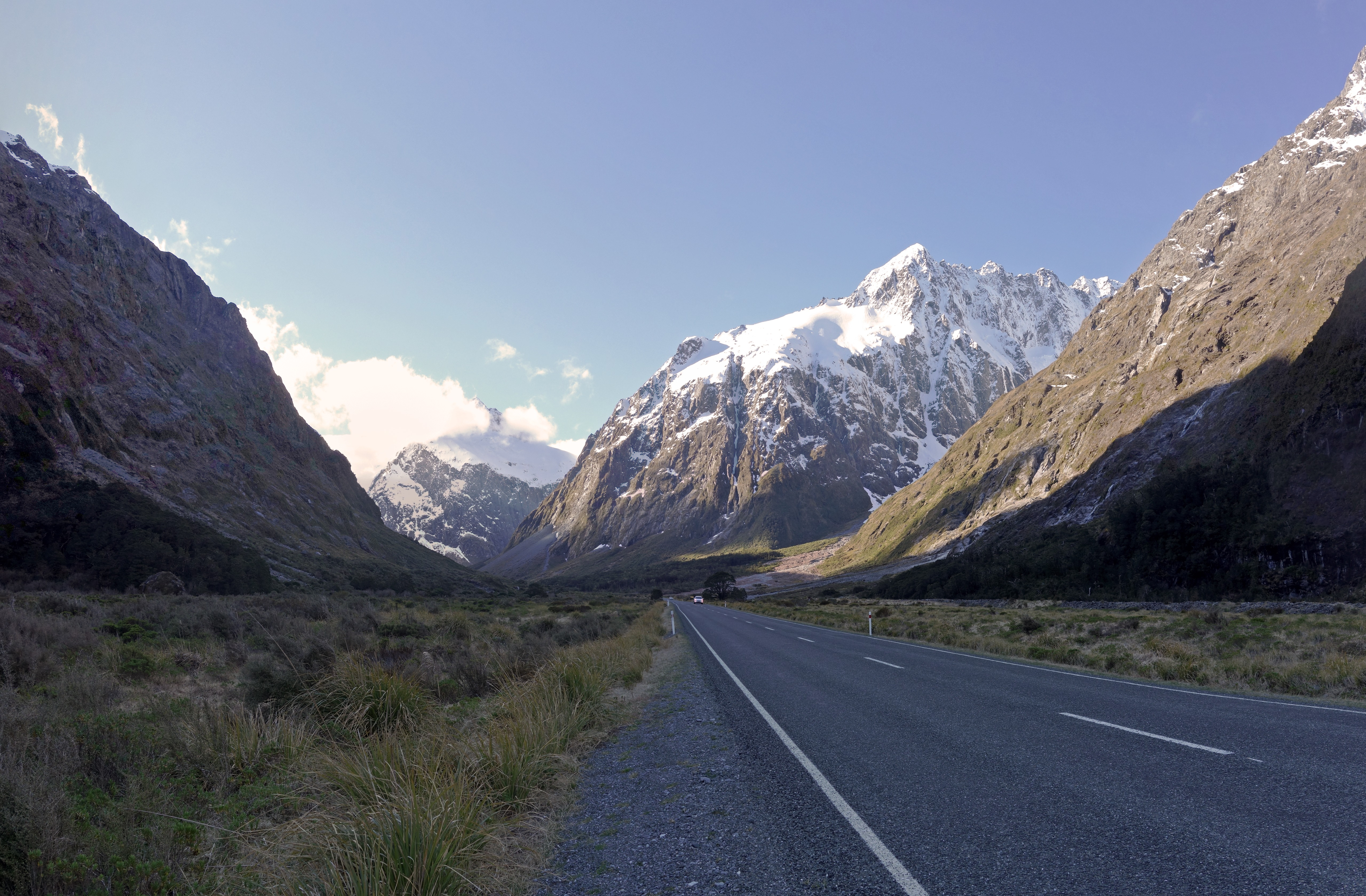
State Highway 94 as it travels through the Hollyford Valley.

Continuing from there, the road rises steadily to the head of the valley, a large cirque surrounded by sheer cliffs of the towering mountains around it. This point, at the eastern portal of Homer Tunnel is the highest point of Milford Road at 945 metres (3,100 ft). Although the tunnel is wide enough for two lanes, traffic lights control traffic to one direction at a time over the peak period of the summer months, which can cause delays of up to 20 minutes. At 1,270 metres (4,170 ft) long, Homer Tunnel is the third-longest road tunnel in New Zealand (after the Waterview Tunnel and the Lyttelton road tunnel).

On the western side of the tunnel, the road emerges at the head of the Cleddau Valley, a U-shaped valley typical for the valleys and fiords of the west coast of Fiordland. After descending steeply via three hairpin turns, the road follows the valley floor for its last 16 kilometres down to sea level at Milford Sound, passing one last car park at The Chasm along the way. At the road's end at Milford Sound, public car parking is provided for over 300 vehicles, as well as parking for tour buses at the visitor terminal next to the wharf.

== Tourist attractions ==
The Milford Road section began in 1926 when a local Station Owner, started making his own road from Te Anau Downs Harbour south to the Te Anau Hotel, starting a project which turned into the most scenic highway in New Zealand including iconic landmarks the Mirror Lakes, the Avenue of Disappearing Mountain, Lake Gunn, the Key Summit, Mount Christina, Mount Talbot, the Homer Tunnel, The Chasm, Mount Tūtoko and Mitre Peak. Before the sealing of the road in the 1980s, it was treated as a day's adventure from the township of Te Anau and Milford Sound the climax of the journey. Modern marketing and faster buses have made Milford Sound a destination from Queenstown involving 8 hours of bus transit, a round trip with few stops. This route is part of the Te Waipounamu Wilderness Area.

The Eglinton Mountains above Lake Gunn were used as a location in the Peter Jackson movie The Fellowship of the Ring where the actors walk along a mountain path with the Key Summit evident in the distance. The mountains here were also used in the Fellowship of the Ring introduction to represent the Misty Mountains. Emily Peak on the Routeburn Track can also be seen in this movie, as well as the Mavora Lakes near Mossburn. Ironically, Peter Jackson picked an area that once contained New Zealand's only place names from J. R. R. Tolkien that was removed from the official maps in the 1980s, as they were deemed inappropriate for this region.

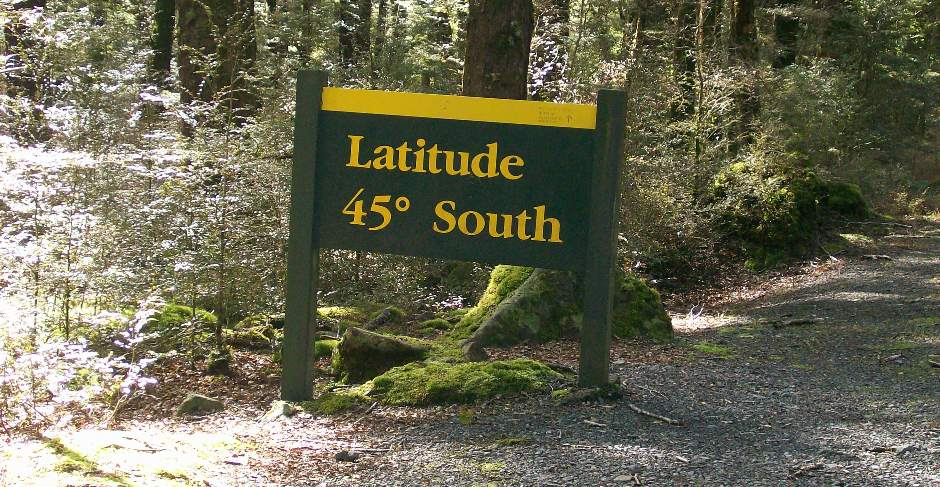
Crossing the Parallel

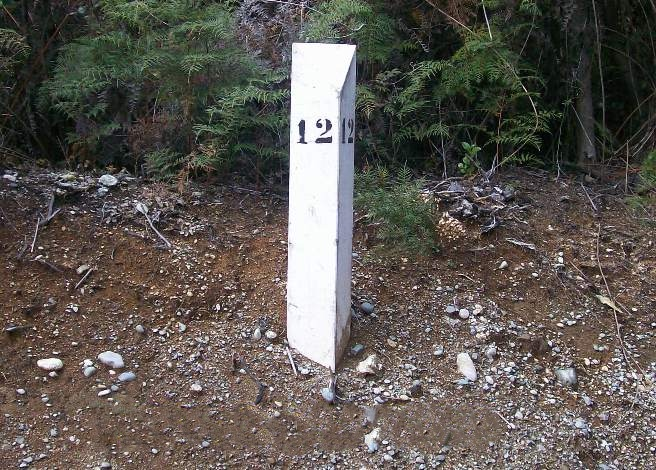
The 12 Mile Post

There are many places of Local History not signposted by Transit New Zealand, such as the Cleddau Horse Bridge, the Hollyford Hydro Powerstation remains, the Old Homer Tunnel construction village site, however, Transit New Zealand has kept the historic White Mile Posts that are a feature of the early days of the Milford Road Construction. The Department of Conservation has kept up the Latitude 45 South Marker but has abandoned the Avenue of the Disappearing Mountain to history as the avenue of trees beside the Road has become overgrown.

The Ōreti, Mataura and Waiau Rivers that dominate the flatter regions of SH 94 between Gore and Te Anau are popular fishing spots for brown trout. Care should be taken while fishing to prevent the spread of Didymosphenia geminata.

== Tourism ==
Tourists to Milford Sound arrive mainly via coach over the length of SH 94 from Mossburn, a predominantly high mountain road which is prone to avalanches in winter. The road was only opened in 1953, after the Homer Tunnel was finished, after almost 20 years of intermittent work. The road is one of the more dangerous public roads in New Zealand, with injury crash rates around 65% higher than the rest of New Zealand's network, and a fatality crash rate of almost twice average (per vehicle kilometre travelled), making it the third most dangerous section of New Zealand's State Highway network (as of 2008). Stopping is prohibited on long stretches due to rock or snow avalanche dangers, and the road is often closed in winter, with the carrying of snow chains mandatory during snow conditions. Helicopters are used during winter to drop explosives onto snow buildup zones above the road in order to cause controlled avalanches. However, this does not eliminate the danger that road traffic may be hit by an uncontrolled event, especially in the area of the Homer Tunnel portals.

== Weather conditions ==
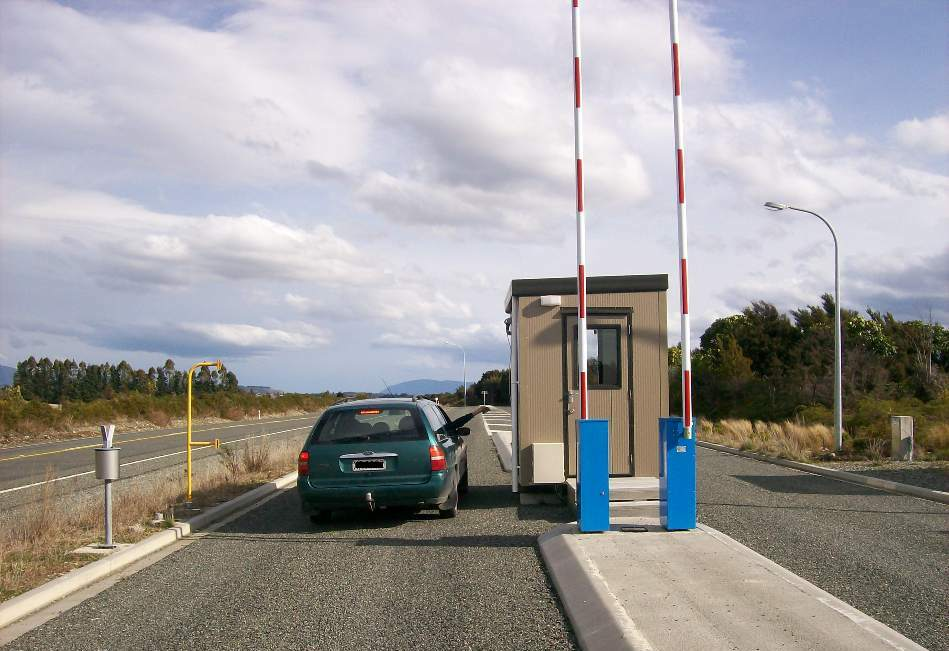
Vehicle Inspection Site on State Highway 94

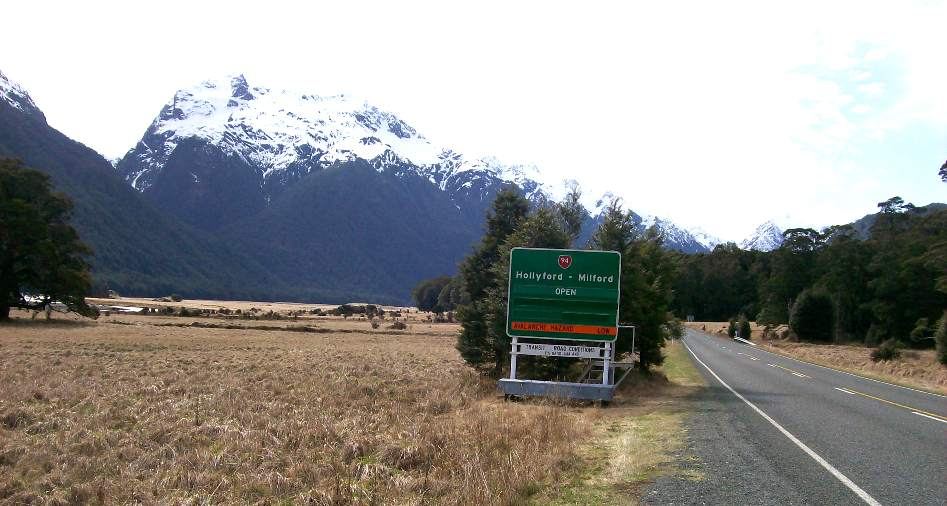
Road Status Sign at Knobs Flat Rest Area

Avalanches are a winter hazard in the high mountains above the Milford Road and snow and ice affect the road surface in the winter months; transit signs inform motorists of conditions and a Transit New Zealand check point has been built to make sure road users carry chains for safe passage to Milford Sound. Metal gates are positioned across the Milford Road in the Hollyford and Cleddau Valleys when the road is closed at times of peak avalanche probability. The road is closed an average 8 days a year, mainly during the winter months, when the entire length of SH 94 is susceptible to snowfall. Snow can fall on higher parts of the road any time of the year, and due to the nature of the Fiordland environment, the road can be closed at any time of year from landslips, treefalls and washouts. Care should be taken year-round, especially on the hillier regions between Mossburn and Milford Sound. Flooding can also occur at any time along the road especially around rivers.

== Literature on the Milford Road ==
Building the Milford Road section of SH 94 has been the subject of several books: Harold Anderson's 1975 Men of the Milford Road, a detailed account of the project from his perspective as a Public Works Department Paymaster; Wilson Campbell's 2000 Novel When stars were brightly shining about a fictional murder in one of the works camps; John Hall-Jones's, Milford Sound An Illustrated History of the Sound, the Track and the Road, which covers in detail the history of the road with ample historic photographs; and Amy McDonalds 2005 Below the Mountains, a young girl's diary of living on the Milford Road 1935 to 1936. And there are mountain climbing books that cover this area in detail, such as Jack Ede's 1988 "Mountain Men of Milford" and Anita Crozier's 1950 Beyond the Southern Lakes.

== Major junctions ==
Territorial authority	Location	km	mi	Destinations	Notes
Gore	Gore	0	0.0	SH 1 east (Medway Street) – Clinton, Dunedin; SH 1 south (Main Street) – Mataura, Invercargill	SH 94 southeastern terminus at roundabout.
Southland	Lumsden	61	38	SH 6 south (Diana Street) - Winton, Invercargill	SH 94/SH 6 concurrency begins.
Southland	Lumsden	64	40	SH 6 north (Five Rivers Lumsden Highway) – Athol, Queenstown	SH 94/SH 6 concurrency begins.
Ōreti River		64.5	40.1	Ōreti River Bridge	
Southland	Mossburn	80	50	SH 97 (Essex Street; Southern Scenic Route) – Queenstown	Southern Scenic Route concurrency begins.
Mararoa River		115	71	Mararoa River Bridge	
Southland	The Key	124	77	Hillside Manapouri Road – Manapouri, Clifden	
Southland	Te Anau	138	86	SH 95 (Manapouri Te Anau Highway; Southern Scenic Route) – Lake Te Anau, Manapouri	
Southland	Fiordland National Park	238	148	Homer Tunnel; 1,270 m (4,170 ft) length	
Southland	Milford Sound	256	159		SH 94 northern terminus. Southern Scenic Route concurrency terminus
1.000 mi = 1.609 km; 1.000 km = 0.621 mi: Concurrency terminus

== See also ==
- List of New Zealand state highways
