= Eglinton River =

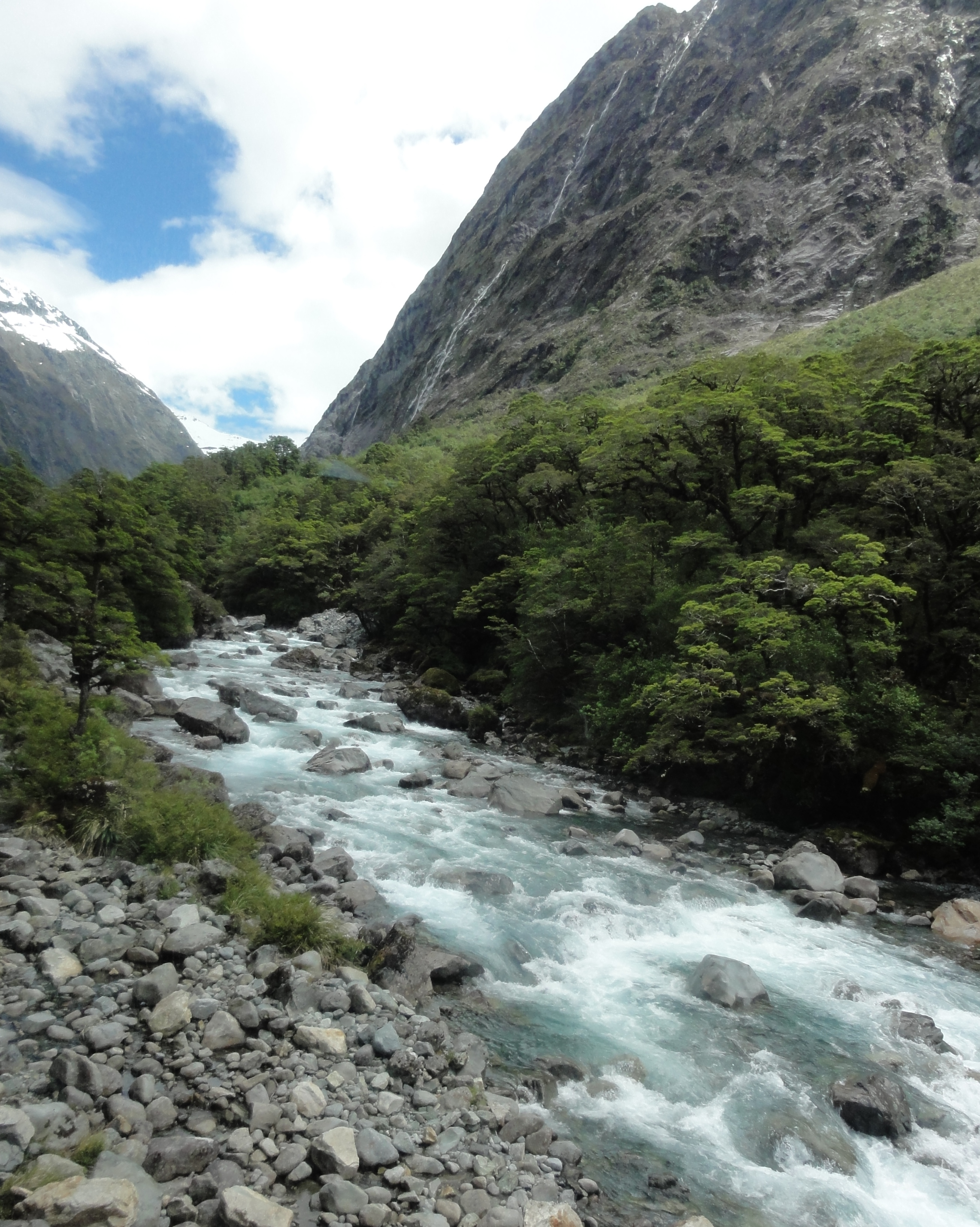
- Route of the Eglinton River
- Mouth of the Eglinton River Eglinton River (South Island)
- Native name: Upokororo

Location
- Country: New Zealand

Physical characteristics
- Source: West Branch
  - location: Lake Fergus
  - coordinates: 44.8918°S 168.0799°E
- 2nd source: East Branch
  - coordinates: 44.9327°S 168.1046°E
- Mouth
  - location: Lake Te Anau
  - coordinates: 45°08′34″S 167°29′27″E
  - elevation: 204 m (669 ft)
- Length: 50 km (31 mi)

Basin features
- Progression: Eglinton River → Lake Te Anau → Waiau River → Foveaux Strait
- Tributaries
  - left: Annear Creek (East Branch), Cascade Creek (West Branch), Plato Creek (West Branch), Smithy Creek (West Branch), Kiosk Creek (West Branch), Wesney Creek (West Branch), Black Creek (West Branch), Mackay Creek, Walker Creek, Boyd Creek, Dunton Creek, Retford Stream
  - right: Mistake Creek (West Branch), Hut Creek (West Branch), Waterfall Creek (West Branch), Murcott Burn (West Branch)
- Waterbodies: Lake Gunn

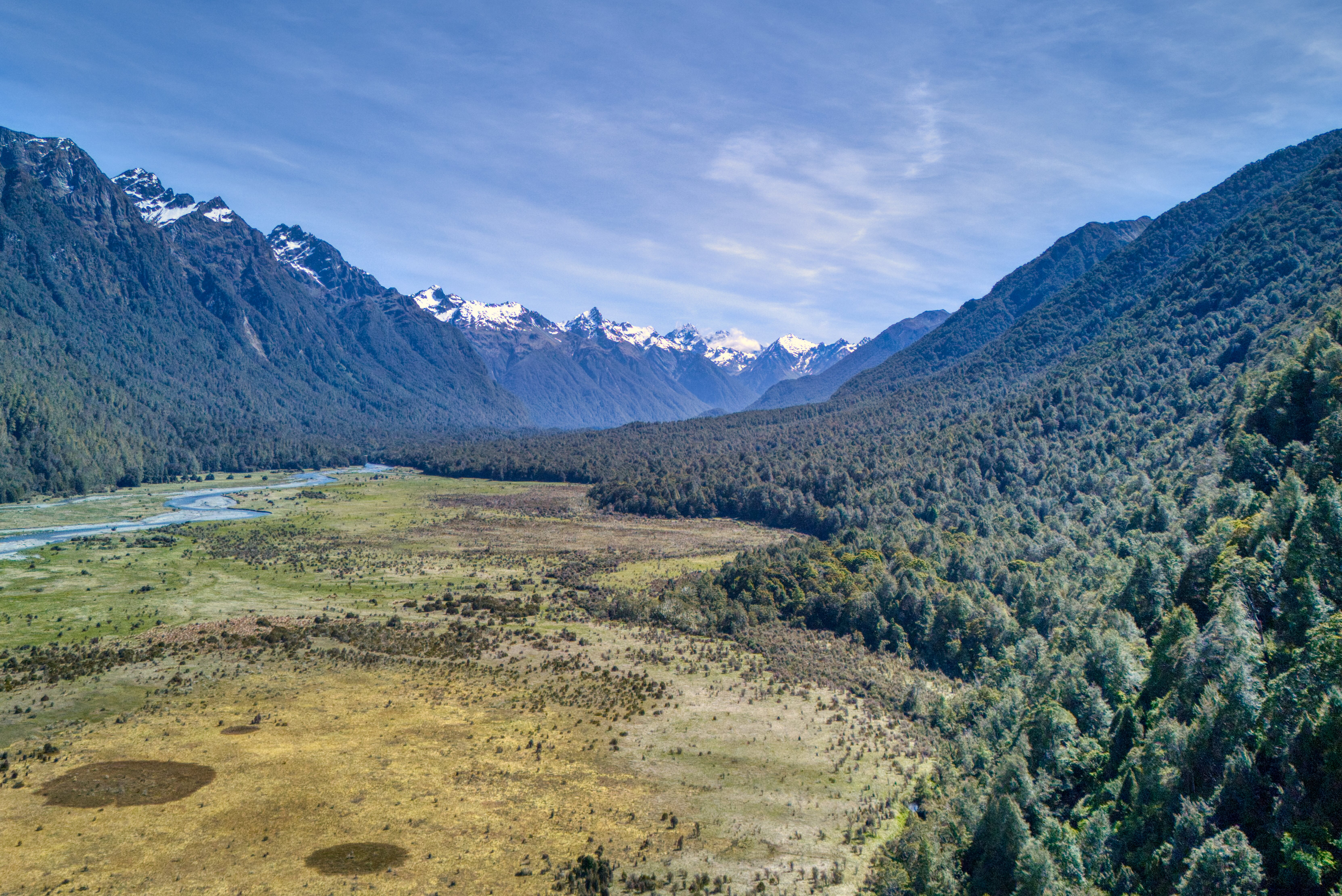
Eglinton Valley

The Eglinton River is located in the region of Southland in the southwest of New Zealand. It flows through Fiordland National Park for 50 kilometres (31 mi). Its headwaters are at Lake Gunn, 25 kilometres (16 mi) east of Milford Sound, and it flows generally south before entering Lake Te Anau along the lake's eastern shore opposite the entrance to North Fiord.

For much of its length the Eglinton is accompanied by the only road in the region, State Highway 94 from Te Anau to Milford Sound. The southern end of the Milford Track is located close to the Eglinton River.

The first Europeans to explore the river were David McKellar and George Gunn, in 1861. The river was named after Archibald Montgomerie, 13th Earl of Eglinton by James McKerrow, an Otago surveyor. The road which is now Highway 94 was built in 1935, opening up the valley to visitors.

The river flow is small leaving Lake Gunn but is greatly increased by Cascade Creek, which joins it just south of the lake. There are short gorges between Lake Gunn and Cascade Creek, and below the junction with Walker Creek. While the river has been kayaked from Cascade Creek, there is not usually sufficient water at this point and whitewater kayaking is more common from the junction with the East Branch. Rainbow and brown trout are available in the river up to Cascade Creek. Deer are hunted throughout the area, and wild pigs can be found near the river mouth.

== Climate ==
Climate data for Eglinton Knobs Flat, elevation 365 m (1,198 ft), (1991–2020)
Month	Jan	Feb	Mar	Apr	May	Jun	Jul	Aug	Sep	Oct	Nov	Dec	Year
Mean daily maximum °C (°F)	19.8 (67.6)	20.0 (68.0)	17.7 (63.9)	14.1 (57.4)	10.7 (51.3)	7.9 (46.2)	7.4 (45.3)	9.9 (49.8)	12.2 (54.0)	14.4 (57.9)	16.3 (61.3)	18.8 (65.8)	14.1 (57.4)
Daily mean °C (°F)	14.1 (57.4)	14.0 (57.2)	12.1 (53.8)	9.1 (48.4)	6.7 (44.1)	3.8 (38.8)	3.4 (38.1)	5.1 (41.2)	7.1 (44.8)	8.8 (47.8)	10.7 (51.3)	13.1 (55.6)	9.0 (48.2)
Mean daily minimum °C (°F)	8.4 (47.1)	8.0 (46.4)	6.5 (43.7)	4.2 (39.6)	2.6 (36.7)	−0.2 (31.6)	−0.5 (31.1)	0.3 (32.5)	1.9 (35.4)	3.2 (37.8)	5.1 (41.2)	7.5 (45.5)	3.9 (39.1)
Average rainfall mm (inches)	224.5 (8.84)	155.6 (6.13)	143.5 (5.65)	214.1 (8.43)	264.0 (10.39)	144.1 (5.67)	227.5 (8.96)	127.7 (5.03)	210.0 (8.27)	220.1 (8.67)	175.4 (6.91)	162.8 (6.41)	2,269.3 (89.36)
Source: NIWA
