= State Highway 95 (New Zealand) =

Road in New Zealand

State Highway 95

Route information
- Maintained by NZ Transport Agency Waka Kotahi
- Length: 20.5 km (12.7 mi)
- Tourist routes: Southern Scenic Route

Major junctions
- North end: SH 94 (Te Anau Mossburn Highway) at Te Anau
- South end: Manapouri

Location
- Country: New Zealand

Highway system
- New Zealand state highways; Motorways and expressways; List
← SH 94	→ SH 96

State Highway 95 is a New Zealand state highway connecting the town of Manapouri with Te Anau at State Highway 94. The highway is a major tourist road and skirts the eastern border of Fiordland National Park between Lake Te Anau and Lake Manapouri. The entire length of the road lies on the Southern Scenic Route between Queenstown and Dunedin via Invercargill. The road itself is largely flat and passes through agricultural land, but affords views of the scenic mountain ranges of Fiordland.

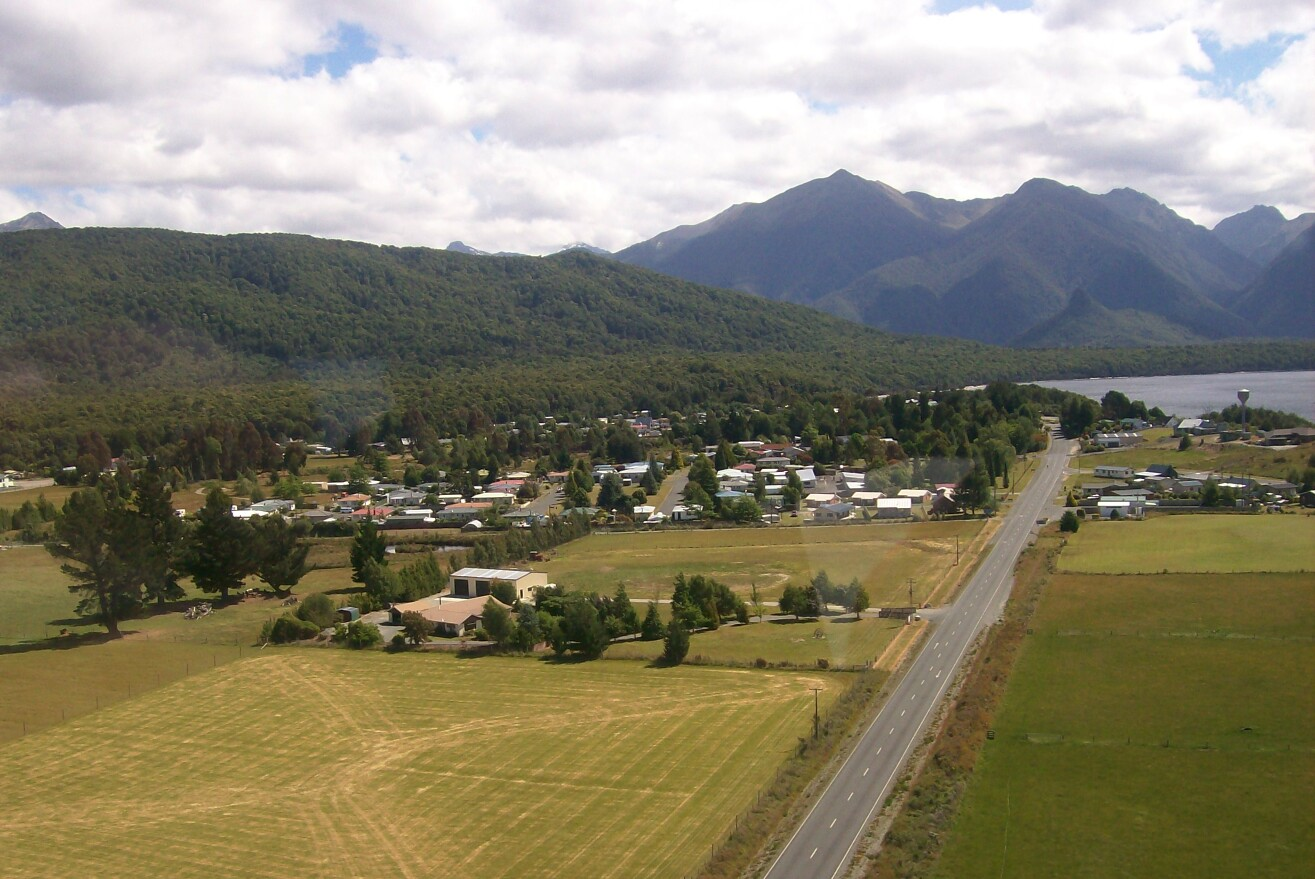
SH 95 leading into the township of Manapouri

== See also ==
- List of New Zealand state highways
