= Lake Gunn =

Lake in New Zealand

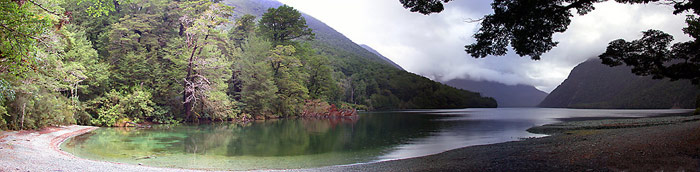
- Lake Gunn in the morning

- Location within New Zealand Location within South Island
- Interactive map of Lake Gunn
- Location: South Island
- Coordinates: 44°53′S 168°05′E
- Primary inflows: west branch of the Eglinton River
- Primary outflows: west branch of the Eglinton River
- Basin countries: New Zealand
- Max. length: 4 km (2.5 mi)
- Surface area: 6 km^{2} (2.3 sq mi)
- Surface elevation: 480 m (1,570 ft)

Lake Gunn is a lake in the South Island of New Zealand, located at 44°53′S 168°05′E.

== Geography ==
A small lake between Lake Te Anau and Milford Sound / Piopiotahi, it lies close to the New Zealand State Highway 94 (the Milford Road) and the Divide of the Southern Alps / Kā Tiritiri o te Moana. The small tramping camp of Cascade Creek lies close to the lake's southern end. The west branch of the Eglinton River flows through the lake. There is a Department of Conservation campsite located within.

The lake is within the boundary of the Fiordland National Park, and is surrounded by native bush. Several smaller lakes lie nearby, including Lake Fergus and Lake McKellar. Several mountains stand close to the lake's western shore, notably Melita Peak (1680 m) and the former Consolation Peak (1760 m) which in December 2012 was nominated to be named after Author JRR Tolkien to the New Zealand Geographic Board to mark two historic events. "The Divide", the saddle between the valleys of the Eglinton and Hollyford Rivers, lies four kilometres north of the lake.

== History ==
The lake was named after George Gunn, a runholder, who was regarded as the first European to visit the lake, in 1861. the name Consolation Peak originated from local Mountaineer Sir Erskine Bowmar but due to an administrative error was placed on the wrong mountain. In 1980 The Name Consolation Peak was moved to another nearby mountain bearing a JRR Tolkien name Mount Gondor (submitted in 1973 at the time of JRR Tolkien's death). Mount Gondor was subsequently omitted from Land Information New Zealand maps from 1980 onwards

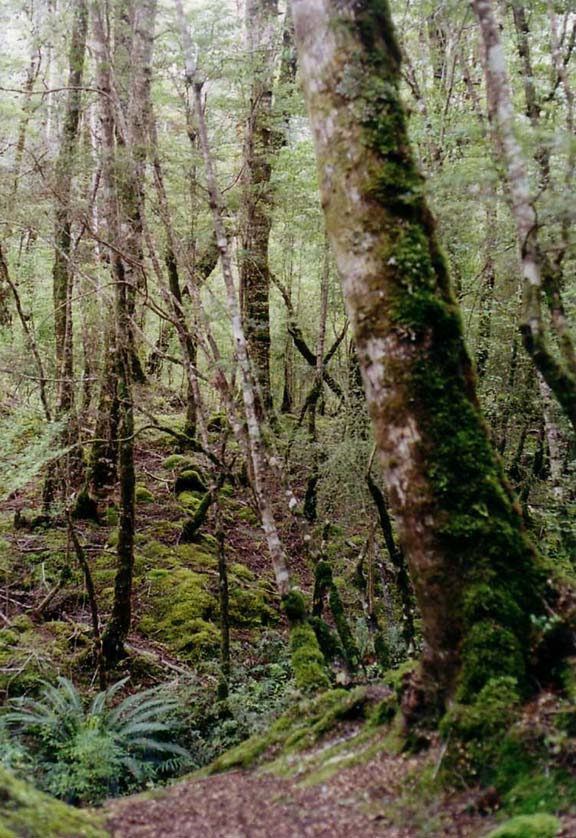
Bush surrounding the lake

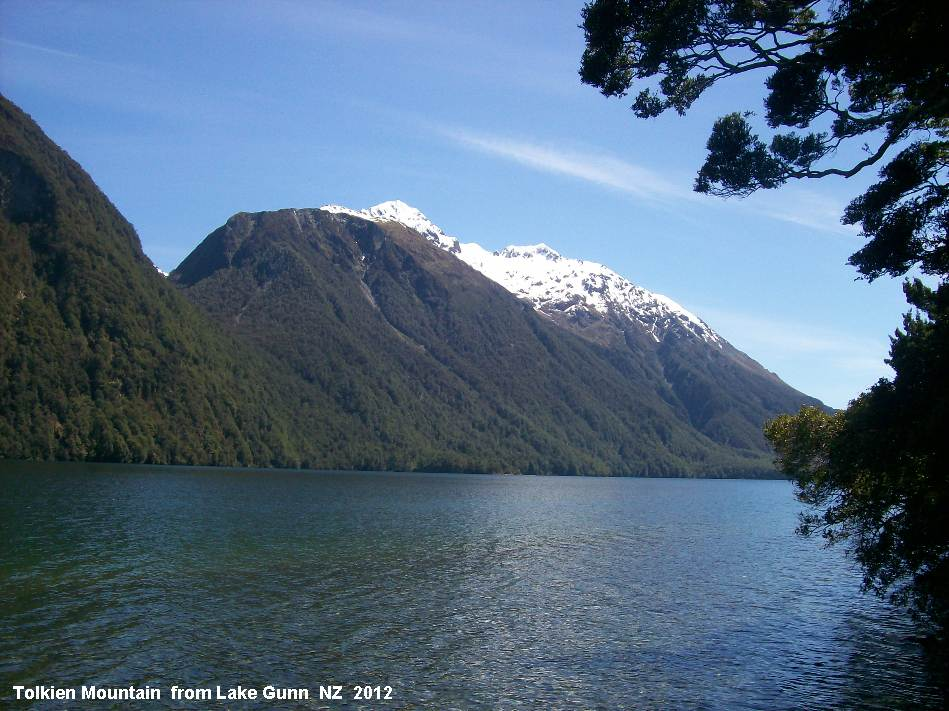
Lake Gunn New Zealand
