= Te Anau Airport, Manapouri =

- IATA: TEU; ICAO: NZMO

Summary
- Airport type: Public
- Owner: Southland District Council
- Operator: Southland District Council
- Serves: Te Anau, Manapouri & Milford Sound (larger aircraft)
- Location: Manapouri
- Elevation AMSL: 687 ft / 209 m
- Coordinates: 45°31′59″S 167°39′00″E
- Website: teanauairport.co.nz

Map
- Location of Te Anau Airport, Manapouri within New Zealand

Runways
Direction	Length		Surface
Direction	ft	m	Surface
08/26	5,229	1,594	Asphalt
14/32	3,179	969	Grass

Te Anau Airport, Manapouri (IATA: TEU, ICAO: NZMO) serves the towns of Te Anau and Manapouri. It is not to be confused with the former and now closed Te Anau Aerodrome located just south of that town.

Te Anau Airport, Manapouri is located 15 km south of Te Anau and 5 km north of Manapouri, on State Highway 95.

== History ==
The airport was originally constructed by Mount Cook Airline as a base for the large Manapouri Powerstation project created in the 1960s.

The airport was sold to the Southland District Council in 2002. They set out a plan to rebuild the airport facilities to modern passenger standards expected today. A new passenger terminal was completed in 2009, replacing the spartan building that still stands as a facilities maintenance building.

The Council widened and lengthened the sealed main runway out to 1600 metres to encourage a return of scheduled services. (that ended in 2000). The sealed runway is equipped with an APAPI system, available only by pre-booking with the airport manager. The terminal building is also only available with prior notice. There is no runway lighting at present. A non-directional beacon is located 2.5NM/6.5 km northeast of the airport.

== Operations ==
Scheduled services have been operated from Queenstown to Te Anau in the past, with Mount Cook Airline's Hawker Siddeley HS 748 and de Havilland DHC-6 Twin Otter aircraft. Air New Zealand ATR-72 aircraft operated when the HS748s and DHC-6s were retired but low passenger numbers saw the service cancelled. Air New Zealand had plans to resume a daily Christchurch service prior to the 2011 earthquake but cancelled the proposal due to a drop in tourist numbers. Since then, the possibility of resuming scheduled air services to Te Anau is occasionally brought up, such as in 2013 when Air New Zealand mentioned the possibility of extending an afternoon return flight from Christchurch to Queenstown on to Te Anau.

Tauck World Discovery Travel currently charters an ATR72-500 aircraft operated by Air Chathams to fly to the airport as part of their New Zealand tours. For 2019 tours, the aircraft flies to Te Anau from Blenheim's Woodbourne Airport, and flies out to Queenstown. From the end of 2014 until February 2019, Tauck chartered a Fokker 50, VH-FKO from Alliance Airlines, which was replaced in the last few weeks with a Fokker 70. Until the end of 2014, Tauck chartered an Air Chathams Convair 580 and, in previous years, they chartered a Vincent Aviation Bae 146-200 "Whisper Jet" to fly from Christchurch to Te Anau return each Wednesday. In October 2015, Kiwi Regional Airlines expressed an interest in flying to Te Anau, but these plans have been scrapped due to the airline ceasing operations (30 July 2016).

The airport is also home to several scenic and charter flight operators which provide flights in and around Fiordland National Park. Air Chathams operates charter flights between Te Anau and the Chatham Islands using their Convair 580 aircraft during the summer months.

Air Fiordland and Fly Fiordland operate from Te Anau to Milford Sound.

== See also ==
- List of airports in New Zealand
- List of airlines of New Zealand
- Transport in New Zealand
