= Fiordland College =

Location
- 4 Howden Street, Te Anau; 45°24′33″S 167°43′26″E

Information
- Type: State co-ed secondary (years 7–13)
- Motto: Reward for effort
- Established: 1976
- Status: Open
- Ministry of Education Institution no.: 400
- Chairperson: Robert Kempthorne
- Principal: Steven Mustor
- Enrolment: 299 (July 2026)
- Socio-economic decile: 9Q
- Website: www.fiordland.school.nz

Fiordland College is a co-educational state secondary school for years 7–13 students. It is one of the two schools in Te Anau, New Zealand. Te Anau is situated on the shores of Lake Te Anau, at the gateway to Fiordland National Park, New Zealand's largest national park. Fiordland College is very involved in environmental education. It has been involved in the Kids Restore the Kepler project for a number of years. Through this, students are offered a vast range of opportunities including wildlife encounters, conservation projects and personal developments opportunities. Fiordland College also has a range of sporting teams such as netball, rugby, field hockey, and kī-o-rahi.

== Notable alumni ==
- Ayesha Verrall – physician and politician
