= Homer Tunnel =

Road tunnel in New Zealand

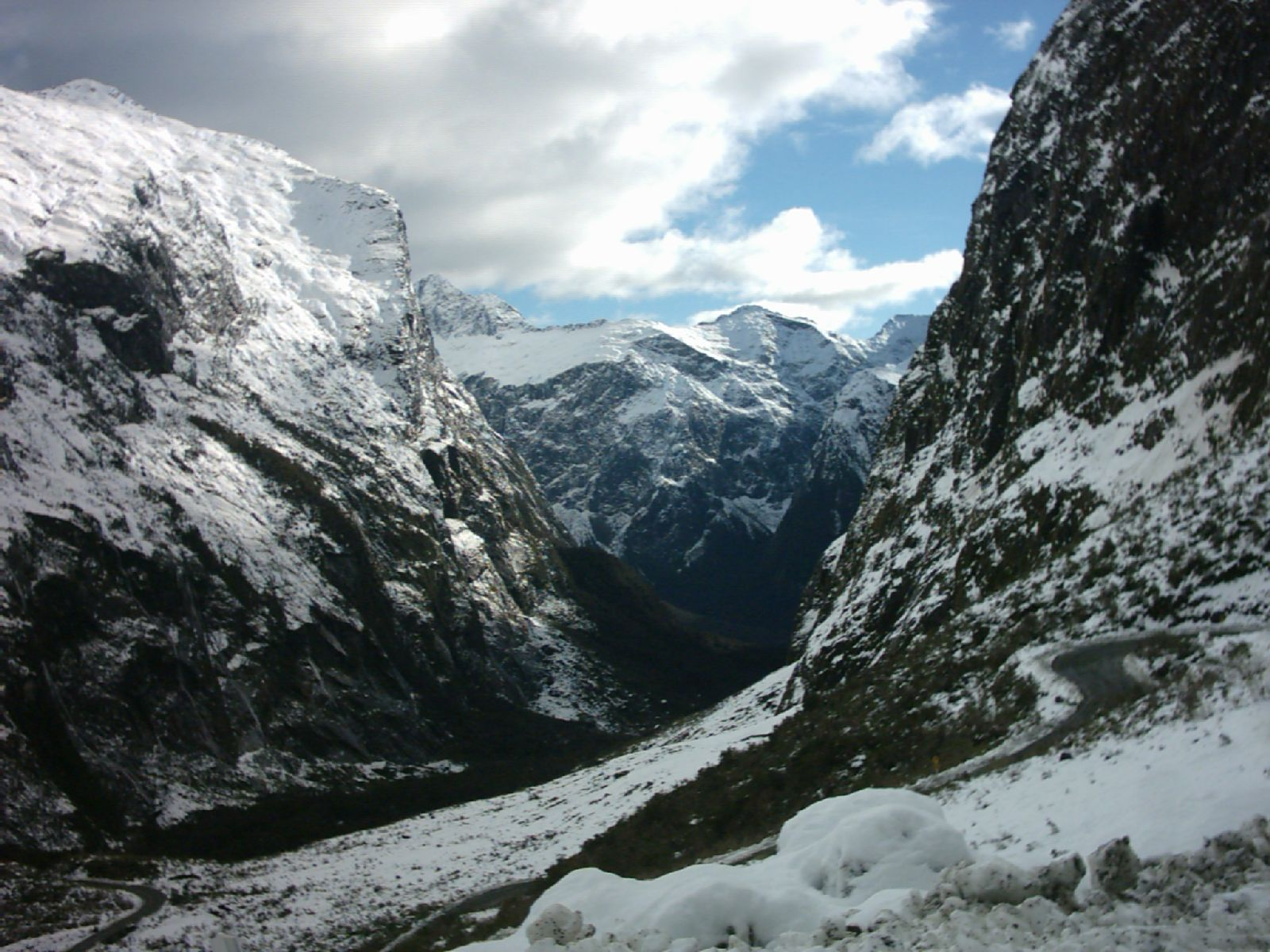
- Winter view from west portal of Homer Tunnel
- Interactive map of Homer Tunnel

Overview
- Location: Fiordland
- Coordinates: 44.764313°S 167.989556°E
- Status: Open
- Route: New Zealand State Highway 94

Operation
- Opened: 1953
- Owner: Waka Kotahi
- Toll: nil

Technical
- Length: 1.2 kilometres (3,900 ft)
- No. of lanes: two

The Homer Tunnel is a 1.2 km (0.75 miles) long road tunnel in the Fiordland region of the South Island of New Zealand, opened in 1953. New Zealand State Highway 94 passes through the tunnel, linking Milford Sound to Te Anau and Queenstown, by piercing the Darran Mountains at the Homer Saddle. It connects between the valley of the Hollyford River to the east and that of the Cleddau to the west.

The tunnel is straight and was originally single-lane and gravel-surfaced. The tunnel walls remain unlined granite. The east portal end is at 945 m elevation; the tunnel runs 1270 m at approximately a 1:10 gradient down to the western portal. Until it was sealed and enlarged it was the longest gravel-surfaced tunnel in the world.

== History ==
William H. Homer and George Barber discovered the Homer Saddle on 27 January 1889. Homer suggested that a tunnel through the saddle would provide access to the Milford area.

Government workers began the tunnel in 1935 after lobbying by J. Cockburn of the Southland Progress League, and the completion of at least a rough road to the eastern portal site in the same year. The tunnel and the associated Milford Road were built by relief workers during the Depression, initially just starting with five men using picks and wheelbarrows. The men had to live in tents in a mountainous area where there might be no direct sunlight for half of the year. At least three were killed by avalanches over the coming decades.

Progress was slow, with difficult conditions including fractures in the rock bringing water from snow melt into the tunnel. Compressors and a powerhouse in the nearby river were eventually built to pump out 40,000 litres of water per hour. Work was also interrupted by World War II (though the actual piercing of the mountain had successfully been achieved in 1940), and an avalanche in 1945 which destroyed the eastern tunnel portal. These problems delayed the tunnel's completion and opening until 1953.

== Safety ==
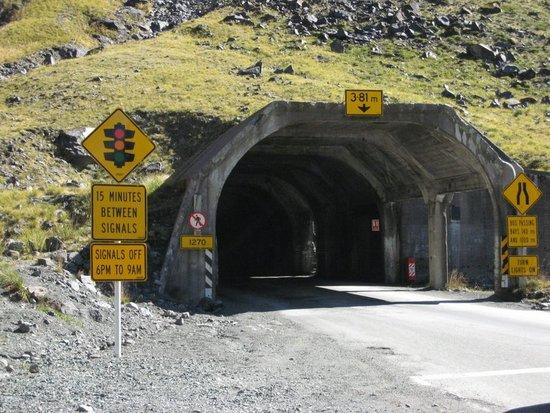
The eastern entrance to the tunnel

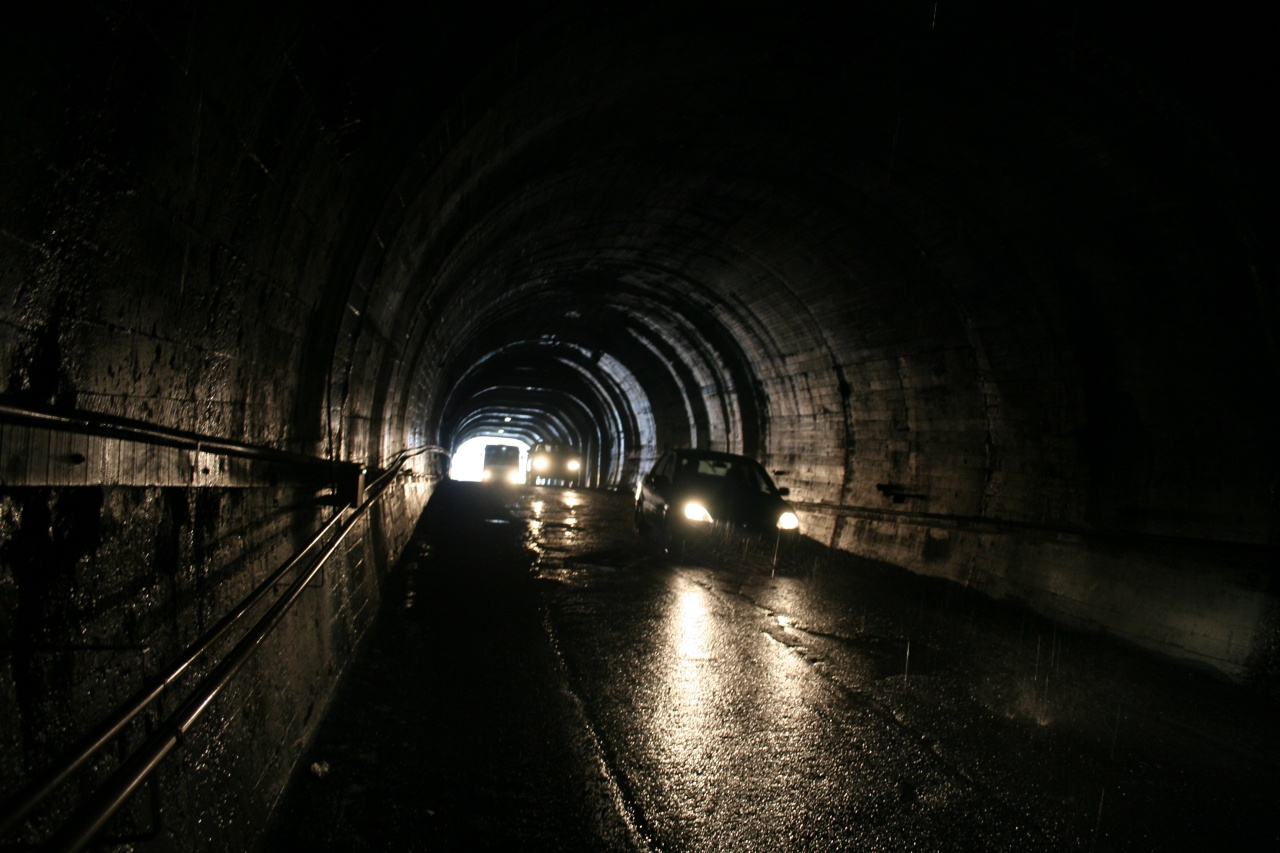
100 metres inside the Homer Tunnel

In 2002 a tour bus carrying tourists from Singapore caught fire inside the tunnel, halting 150m from the eastern portal. The passengers and the bus driver had to walk through the pitch-dark and smoke-filled tunnel to safety with the help of high beams from vehicular traffic at the entrance of the eastern portal. However, two passengers got separated and made their way to the Milford end. Three people were flown to Southland Hospital and observed for about an hour after inhaling smoke from the burning bus. As a result of this incident a satellite phone and fire extinguishers were installed in the tunnel.

Two tourist buses were destroyed by fire outside the tunnel in January and March 2008, though the fires were not related to the tunnel.

Roof lighting was fitted and traffic lights reintroduced in 2004 to reduce capacity constraints and safety issues. Although the tunnel is large enough for a bus and a smaller vehicle to pass, meetings involving two coaches or campervans are problematic. This is alleviated by the fact that the traffic is very tidal, towards Milford Sound in the morning and toward Te Anau in the afternoon. The traffic lights operate only during the day during the peak summer season, since the avalanche risk makes it unsafe to stop and queue at the portals in winter and spring. With increasing traffic on the road, it is expected that the risk to vehicles waiting at the portal will also increase.

A widening of the tunnel, to allow for true two-laning, has been discussed many times. While this would make it unnecessary to force cars to wait in the avalanche areas, the high costs make this unlikely, especially for a road which (in national-level terms) carries little traffic—even if it is of very high importance for the tourism industry. Avalanche warning systems in the area are also considered to meet typical worldwide standards. In addition, Transit New Zealand (as of 2005) had the realignment of the Homer east portal avalanche shed as one of the 'large activity priorities' on its planning list. The project would have cost around NZ$14–15 million and was unlikely to start before the end of that decade. In 2010, it was again reported that the tunnel may be widened.

In 2020 widening was not in scope when the New Zealand Government announced $25 million in funding for tunnel safety improvements through its rejuvenation package and the works were commenced, expecting to be completed by 2023. However in 2021 it was reported that budget constraints meant that the upgrades would need to be scaled back.

Other proposals have been made to bypass the Homer tunnel entirely to reduce the journey time from Queenstown, including a Milford Dart tunnel, which was declined in 2013.

== See also ==
- Transport in Milford Sound
