= Te Anau =

Town in Southland, New Zealand

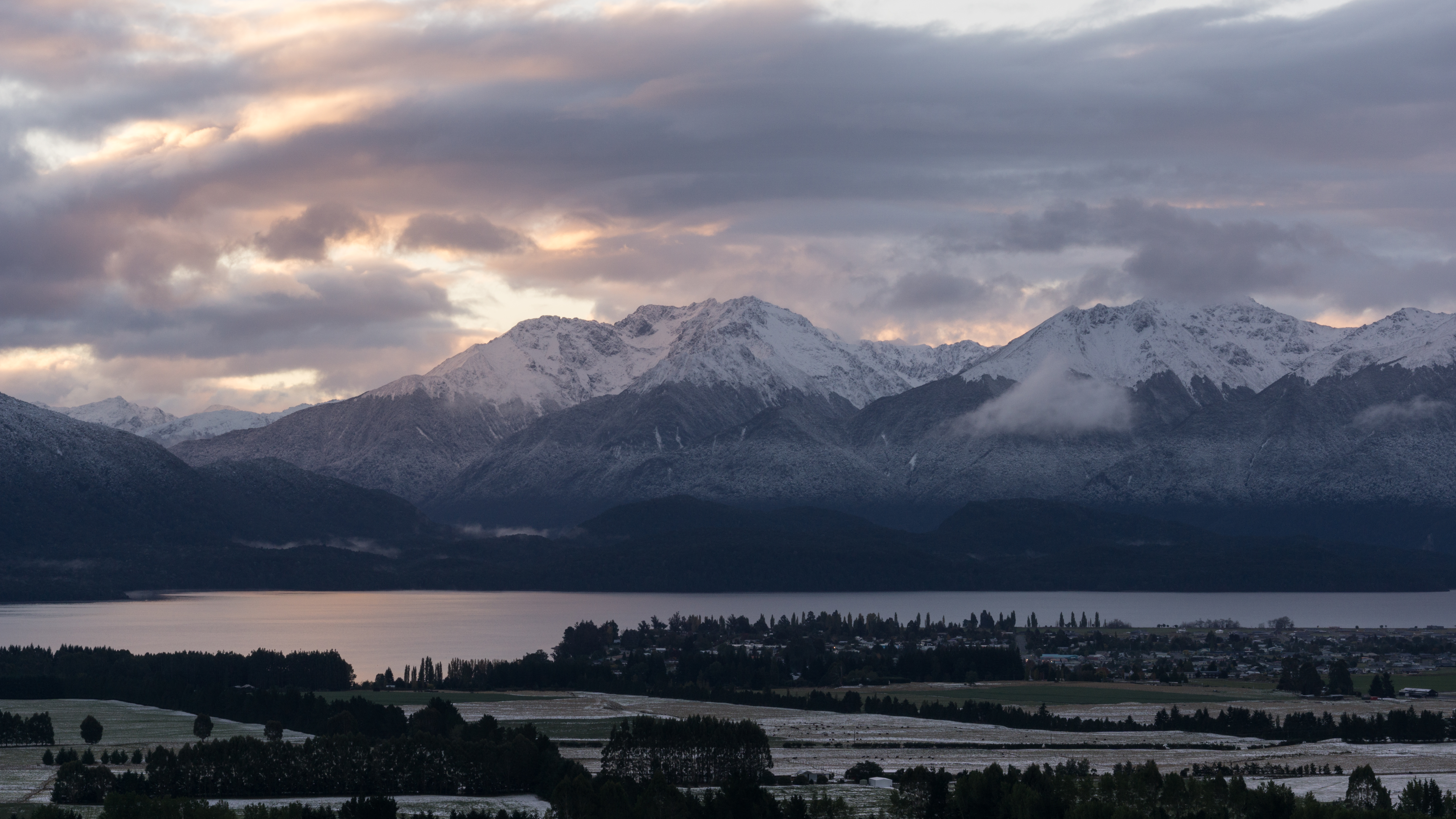
- Interactive map of Te Anau
- Coordinates: 45°25′S 167°43′E
- Country: New Zealand
- Island: South Island
- Region: Southland region
- Territorial authorities of New Zealand: Southland District
- Ward: Mararoa Waimea Ward
- Community: Fiordland Community
- Electorates: Southland; Te Tai Tonga (Māori)

Government
  - Territorial authority: Southland District Council
  - Regional council: Southland Regional Council
  - Mayor of Southland: Rob Scott
  - Southland MP: Joseph Mooney
  - Te Tai Tonga MP: Mananui Ramsden

Area
  - Total: 6.64 km^{2} (2.56 sq mi)

Population (June 2025)
  - Total: 2,920
  - Density: 440/km^{2} (1,140/sq mi)
- Postcode(s): 9600
- Area code: 03

Te Anau is a town in the Southland region of the South Island of New Zealand. In Māori, Te-Anau means the Place of the Swirling Waters. It is on the eastern shore of Lake Te Anau in Fiordland. Te Anau is 155 kilometres north of Invercargill and 171 kilometres to the southwest of Queenstown (via state highway 6). Manapouri lies 21 kilometres to the south. Te Anau lies at the southern end of the Milford Road, (State Highway 94) 117 kilometres to the south of Milford Sound.

== History ==
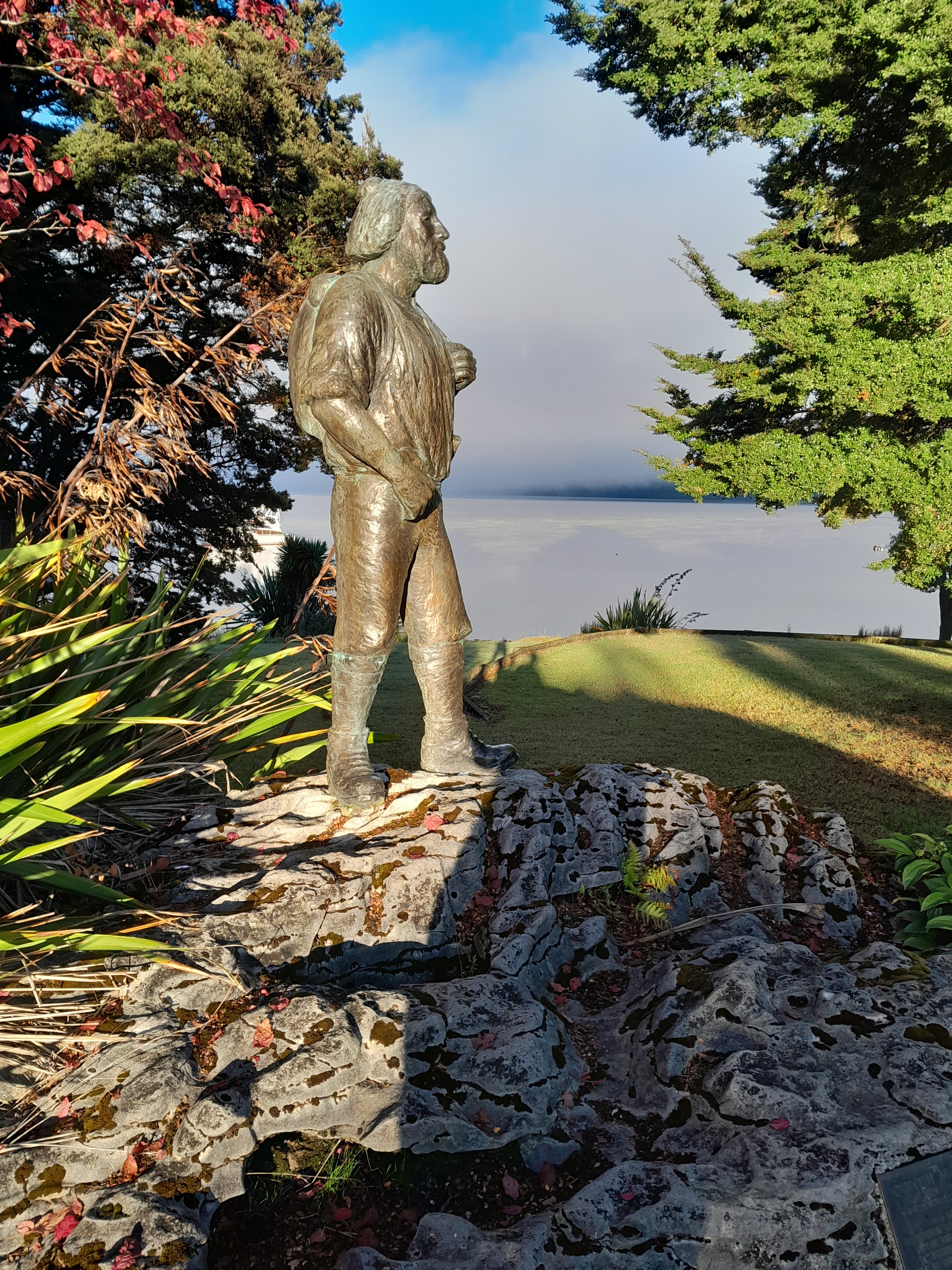
Statue of explorer Quintin MacKinnon on Lakefront Drive with Lake Te Anau in the background.

The first Europeans (C.J. Nairn and W.J. Stephen) to visit the lake were led by Māori guides in 1852. The lake was formally surveyed first in 1863. The township was surveyed in 1893. This was soon after the Milford Track opened. The town only really started to grow after the opening of the Homer Tunnel and road route to Milford in 1953.

== Demographics ==
Te Anau covers 6.64 km^{2} (2.56 sq mi) and had an estimated population of 2,920 as of June 2025, with a population density of 440 people per km^{2}.

Historical population
Year	Pop.	±% p.a.
1971	1,642	—
1976	2,384	+7.74%
1981	2,610	+1.83%
1986	2,518	−0.72%
1991	2,604	+0.67%
1996	1,785	−7.27%
2001	1,857	+0.79%
2006	1,935	+0.83%
2013	2,001	+0.48%
2018	2,538	+4.87%
Populations before 2006 are for a slightly smaller area. Source:

Before the 2023 census, Te Anau had a smaller boundary, covering 5.53 km^{2} (2.14 sq mi). Using that boundary, Te Anau had a population of 2,538 at the 2018 New Zealand census, an increase of 537 people (26.8%) since the 2013 census, and an increase of 603 people (31.2%) since the 2006 census. There were 987 households, comprising 1,263 males and 1,278 females, giving a sex ratio of 0.99 males per female. The median age was 39.4 years (compared with 37.4 years nationally), with 441 people (17.4%) aged under 15 years, 453 (17.8%) aged 15 to 29, 1,221 (48.1%) aged 30 to 64, and 423 (16.7%) aged 65 or older.

Ethnicities were 82.9% European/Pākehā, 8.4% Māori, 1.1% Pasifika, 11.8% Asian, and 3.8% other ethnicities. People may identify with more than one ethnicity.

The percentage of people born overseas was 25.2, compared with 27.1% nationally.

Although some people chose not to answer the census's question about religious affiliation, 58.9% had no religion, 30.6% were Christian, 0.1% had Māori religious beliefs, 1.4% were Hindu, 0.5% were Muslim, 0.7% were Buddhist and 2.0% had other religions.

Of those at least 15 years old, 387 (18.5%) people had a bachelor's or higher degree, and 354 (16.9%) people had no formal qualifications. The median income was $33,900, compared with $31,800 nationally. 249 people (11.9%) earned over $70,000 compared to 17.2% nationally. The employment status of those at least 15 was that 1,287 (61.4%) people were employed full-time, 345 (16.5%) were part-time, and 18 (0.9%) were unemployed.

=== Whitestone ===
Whitestone is a statistical area which surrounds Te Anau and covers 89.94 km^{2} (34.73 sq mi). It had an estimated population of 640 as of June 2025, with a population density of 7.1 people per km^{2}.

Historical population for Whitestone
Year	Pop.	±% p.a.
2006	378	—
2013	540	+5.23%
2018	618	+2.74%

Before the 2023 census, Whitestone had a larger boundary, covering 91.17 km^{2} (35.20 sq mi). Using that boundary, Whitestone had a population of 618 at the 2018 New Zealand census, an increase of 78 people (14.4%) since the 2013 census, and an increase of 240 people (63.5%) since the 2006 census. There were 231 households, comprising 315 males and 303 females, giving a sex ratio of 1.04 males per female. The median age was 48.9 years (compared with 37.4 years nationally), with 108 people (17.5%) aged under 15 years, 81 (13.1%) aged 15 to 29, 309 (50.0%) aged 30 to 64, and 120 (19.4%) aged 65 or older.

Ethnicities were 96.1% European/Pākehā, 10.2% Māori, 1.9% Asian, and 1.9% other ethnicities. People may identify with more than one ethnicity.

The percentage of people born overseas was 14.1, compared with 27.1% nationally.

Although some people chose not to answer the census's question about religious affiliation, 60.7% had no religion, 33.5% were Christian, 0.5% were Buddhist and 0.0% had other religions.

Of those at least 15 years old, 111 (21.8%) people had a bachelor's or higher degree, and 90 (17.6%) people had no formal qualifications. The median income was $43,600, compared with $31,800 nationally. 132 people (25.9%) earned over $70,000 compared to 17.2% nationally. The employment status of those at least 15 was that 318 (62.4%) people were employed full-time, and 99 (19.4%) were part-time.

== Economy ==
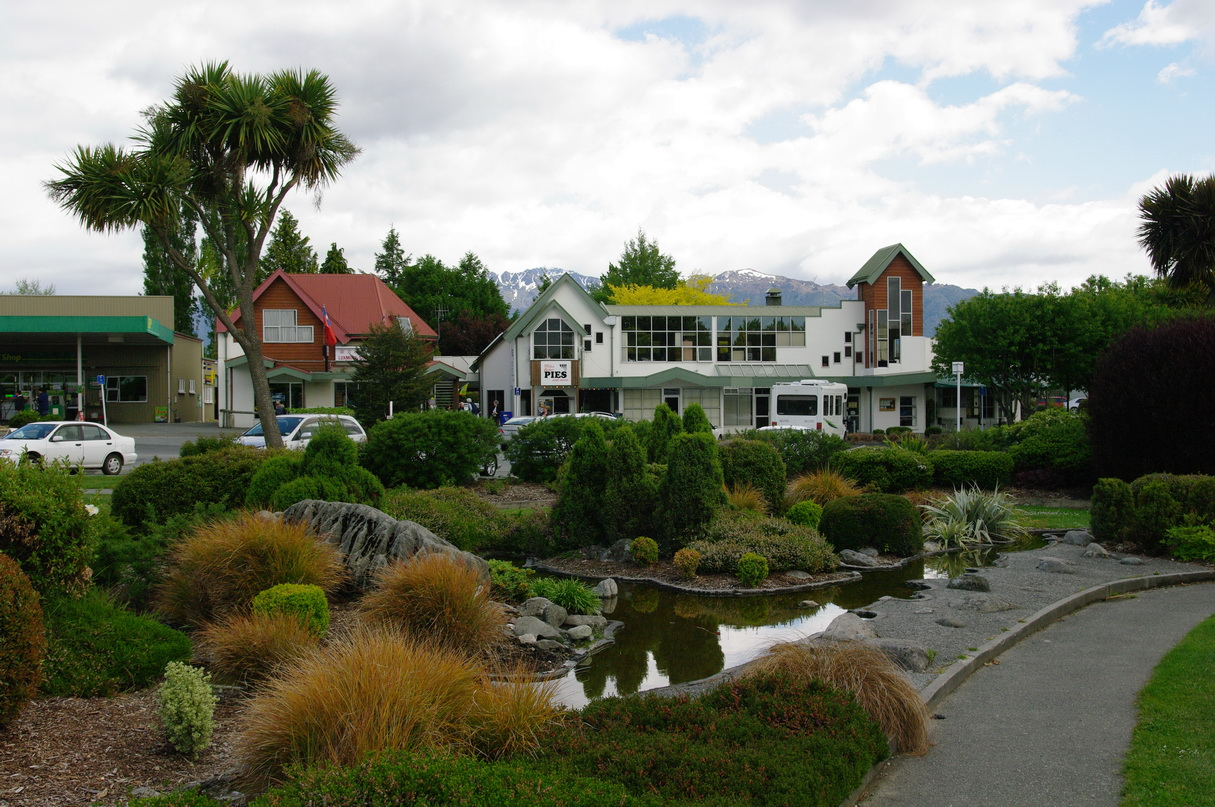
Te Anau

Tourism and farming are the predominant economic activities in the area. Lying as it does at the borders of Fiordland National Park, it is the gateway to a wilderness area famed for tramping and spectacular scenery. Many tourists come to Te Anau to visit the famous nearby fiords Milford Sound / Piopiotahi and Doubtful Sound / Patea. Visitors to the area also partake in activities such as kayaking, cycling, jet boat riding, fishing and hunting, farm tours and seaplane/helicopter sightseeing. In 2014, readers of New Zealand's Wilderness magazine voted Te Anau as the best location in New Zealand for tramping (hiking) opportunities. The town has a wide range of accommodation, with over 4,000 beds available in summer.

== Geography ==
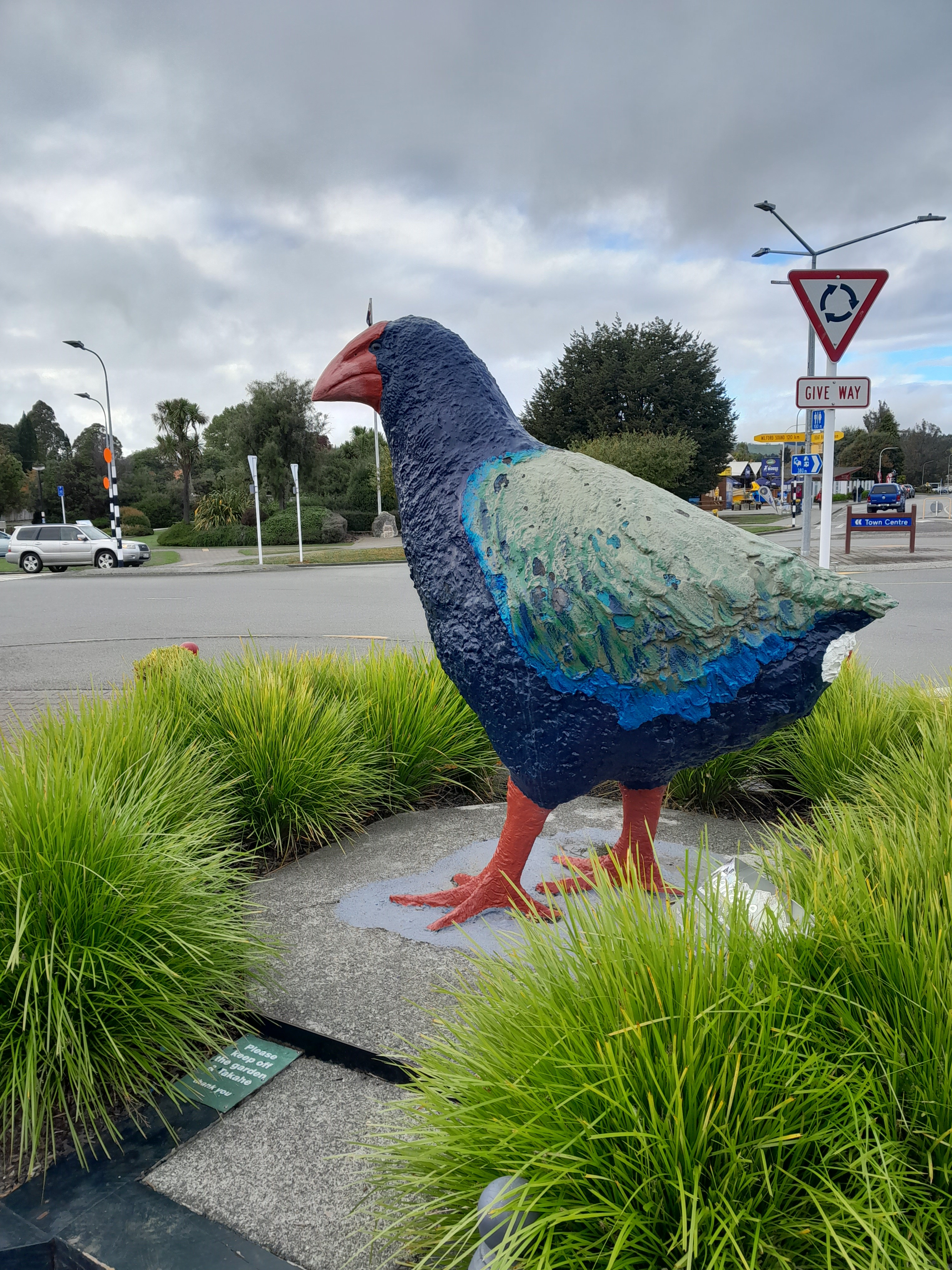
A statue of a Takahē, located in central Te Anau (2023)

Lake Te Anau is the largest lake in the South Island and within New Zealand second only to Lake Taupō. Rising on the west side of Lake Te Anau, the Kepler and Murchison mountain ranges are evident from most of Te Anau. Many species of bird life are also found locally. The Department of Conservation office in Te Anau is active in protecting endangered native birds

== Climate ==
Climate data for Te Anau, elevation 560 m (1,840 ft), (1981–2010)
Month	Jan	Feb	Mar	Apr	May	Jun	Jul	Aug	Sep	Oct	Nov	Dec	Year
Mean daily maximum °C (°F)	20.0 (68.0)	20.1 (68.2)	18.1 (64.6)	15.1 (59.2)	11.7 (53.1)	8.9 (48.0)	8.4 (47.1)	10.4 (50.7)	13.0 (55.4)	14.9 (58.8)	17.1 (62.8)	19.0 (66.2)	14.7 (58.5)
Daily mean °C (°F)	14.8 (58.6)	14.6 (58.3)	12.7 (54.9)	10.4 (50.7)	7.6 (45.7)	5.3 (41.5)	4.8 (40.6)	6.0 (42.8)	8.1 (46.6)	9.7 (49.5)	11.6 (52.9)	13.5 (56.3)	9.9 (49.9)
Mean daily minimum °C (°F)	9.5 (49.1)	9.1 (48.4)	7.3 (45.1)	5.7 (42.3)	3.5 (38.3)	1.8 (35.2)	1.1 (34.0)	1.6 (34.9)	3.3 (37.9)	4.5 (40.1)	6.2 (43.2)	8.0 (46.4)	5.1 (41.2)
Average rainfall mm (inches)	165.3 (6.51)	91.9 (3.62)	104.8 (4.13)	80.3 (3.16)	90.8 (3.57)	112.1 (4.41)	82.7 (3.26)	85.2 (3.35)	73.4 (2.89)	133.8 (5.27)	74.5 (2.93)	107.7 (4.24)	1,202.5 (47.34)
Mean monthly sunshine hours	177.0	167.9	141.9	126.8	83.4	63.5	59.8	111.7	136.4	172.1	183.4	169.8	1,593.7
Source: NIWA

== Attractions ==
=== Fiordland vintage machinery museum ===
The Fiordland vintage machinery museum has, in its collection, displays of Te Anau's early history, a blacksmith shop, 60 working tractors, road graders, motor bikes and Te Anau's first school building.

=== Tramping ===
The town is often used as a base for trampers undertaking the Milford Track and the Kepler Track, the latter being a 4-day loop from Te Anau.

=== Kepler Challenge ===
Te Anau hosts the Kepler Challenge in early December each year.

=== Glow worm caves ===
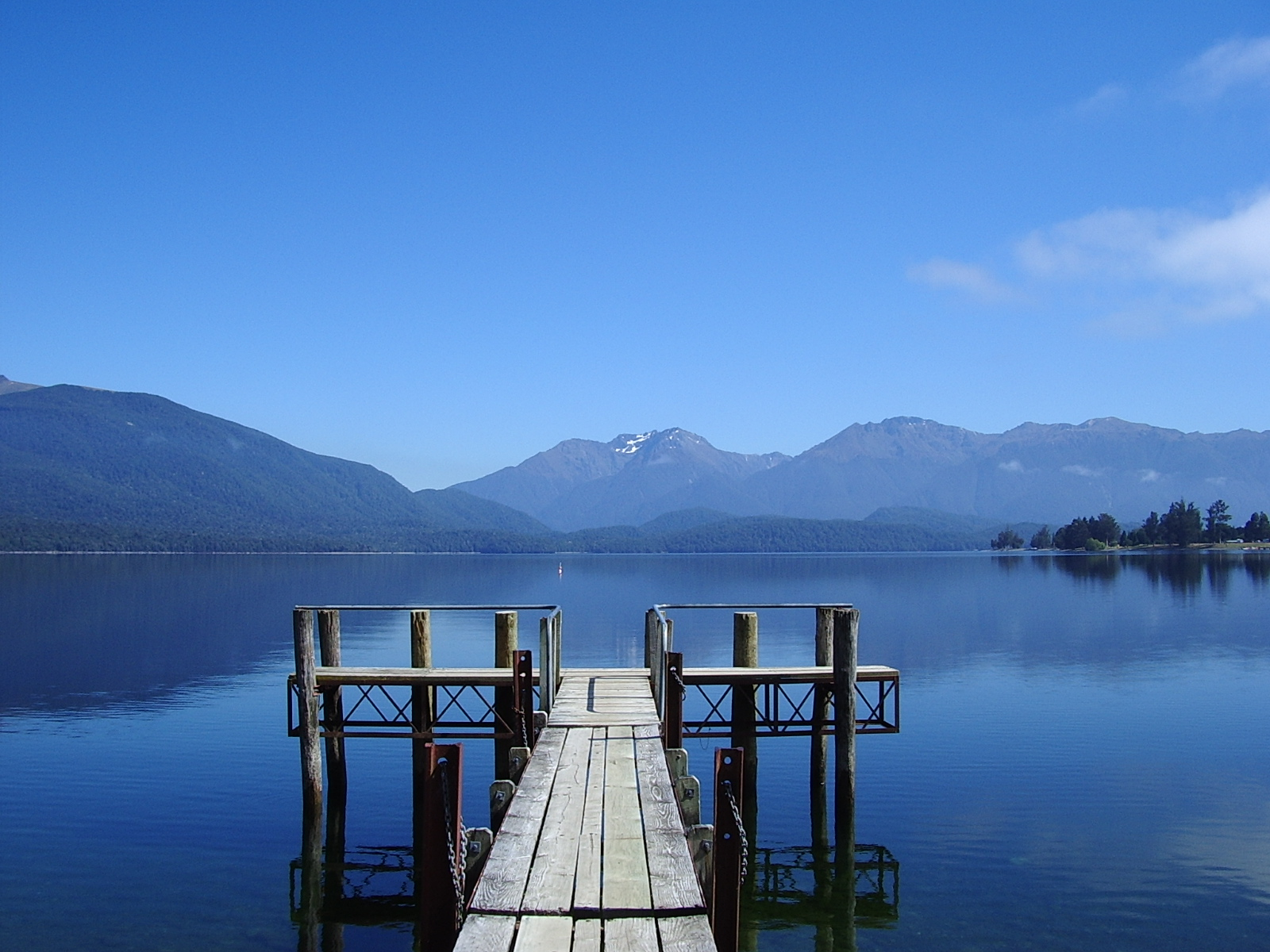
Jetty overlooking Lake Te Anau, New Zealand.

A local attraction is the Te Ana-au Caves across Lake Te Anau from the town. The caves include an underground glowworm grotto, which can be viewed from a punt during daily guided tours.

=== Te Anau bird sanctuary ===
The Te Anau bird sanctuary or Punanga Manu o Te Anau is located on the southern shore of Lake Te Anau. it is possible to see takahē, kākā, Antipodes Island parakeets, blue duck (whio) and other native birds.

=== Lake2Lake trail ===
The Lake2Lake trail is a cycle trail that starts at Te Anau and follows the Waiau River to Lake Manapouri. The trail is 28.5 kilometres long.

== Amenities ==
=== Fiordland Community Events Centre ===
The RealNZ Fiordland Community Events Centre has a 300 square metre climbing wall, bouldering wall, indoor courts for sports such as netball, basketball, volleyball, badminton. It also has a stage and meeting rooms.

=== Te Anau golf club ===
The Te Anau golf club is located at 169 Golf Course Road and the 18 hole golf course overlooks Lake Te Anau.

=== Perenuka mountain bike park ===
The mountain bike park has a range of trails. It is located at 2 Sinclair road.

=== Fiordland community swimming pool ===
The Fiordland community swimming pool is a 25 metre heated indoor pool. It is located on Howden Street.

=== Te Anau Disc Golf ===
The Te Anau disc golf course is located within the Ivon Wilson Recreational Reserve.

== Education ==
Fiordland College is a co-educational secondary school for years 7 to 13 with a roll of 299 students as of July 2026.. The college was established in 1976.

Te Anau School – Te Kura o Te Anau is a co-educational contributing primary school for years 1 to 6 with a roll of 273 students as of July 2026.. The school first opened in 1937.

== Transport ==
Te Anau is served by Te Anau Airport which is 15 km (9.3 mi) south of the town on State Highway 95. It was proposed in 2016 to develop the airport in order to enable commercial flights in from Christchurch in order to boost tourism.

State Highway 94 approaches the town from the east and is the most important corridor connecting Te Anau and its surrounds to the rest of the South Island highway network. SH94 also connects through to Milford sound.

There are a number of private bus operators that connect Te Anau to; Invercargill, Queenstown, smaller nearby towns, and various trailheads or tourist attractions in the area. Timetables are often seasonal with more in summer and less in winter. There are also a large number of buses that travel through Te Anau while going between Queenstown and Milford Sound as a part of one-day package experiences.

The Southern Scenic Route, a signposted route travelling on a number of different State Highways and local roads travels through Te Anau.
