= Kepler Track =

New Zealand tramping track

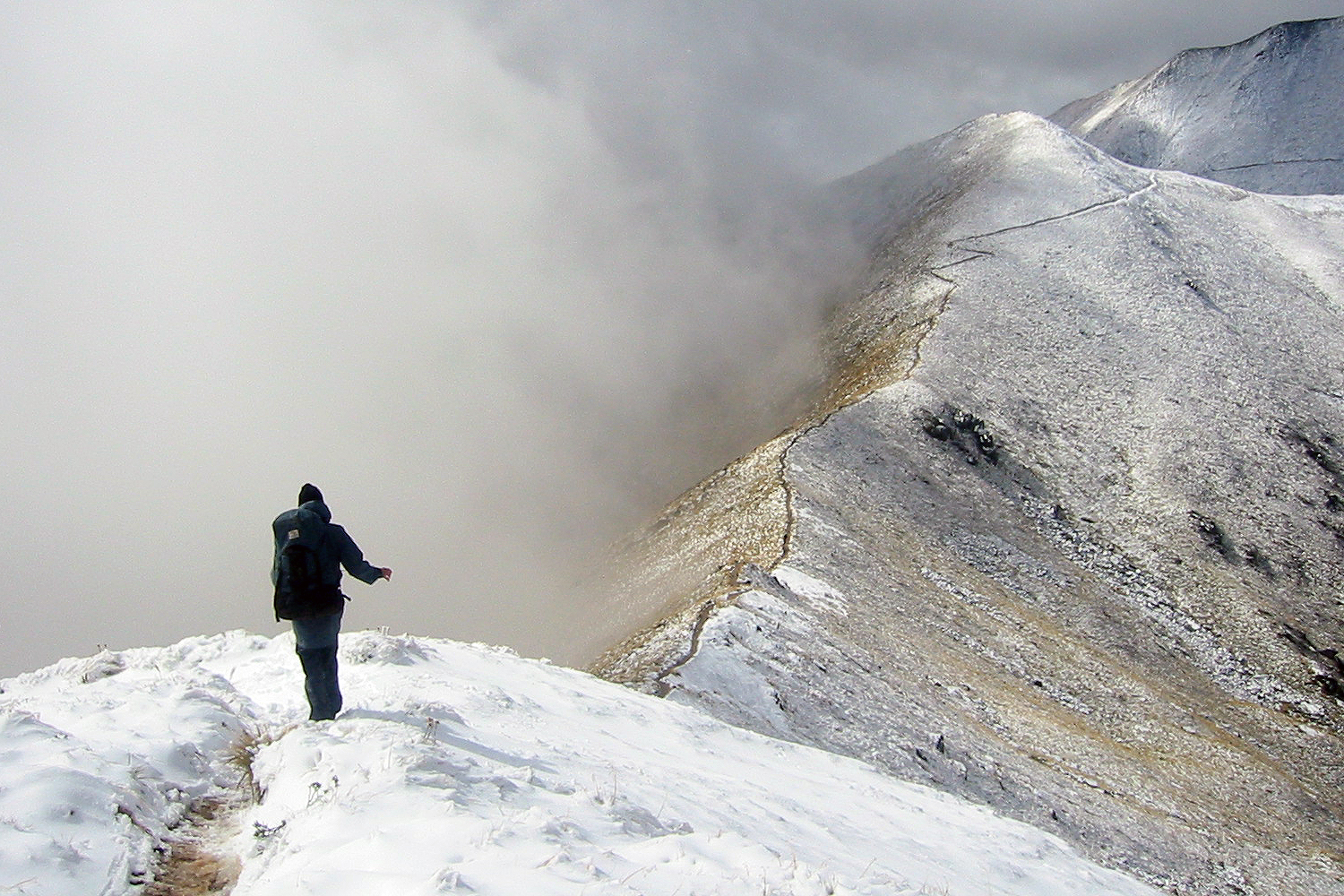
- An alpine section of the Kepler Track
- Length: 60 km (37 mi)
- Location: Fiordland National Park, Southland, New Zealand
- Designation: New Zealand Great Walk
- Trailheads: Lake Te Anau control gates, Rainbow Reach, Brod Bay
- Use: Hiking, running
- Highest point: Luxmore Saddle 1,400 m (4,600 ft)
- Lowest point: Lake Manapouri, 178 m (584 ft)
- Difficulty: medium
- Season: Summer to Autumn
- Months: Late October to mid April Possible to walk in winter months too, but for experienced hikers only
- Sights: Ridgetop alpine views, lakes, wetlands, forests, rivers, waterfalls
- Hazards: Hypothermia, sunburn, high winds

The Kepler Track is a 60 km (37 mi) circular hiking track which travels through the landscape of the South Island of New Zealand and is situated near the town of Te Anau. The track passes through many landscapes of the Fiordland National Park such as rocky mountain ridges, tall mossy forests, lake shores, deep gorges, rare wetlands, tussock grasslands, and rivers. Like the mountains it traverses, the track is named after Johannes Kepler. The track is one of the New Zealand Great Walks and is administered by the Department of Conservation (DOC).

Compared with other tracks in New Zealand, this walking track is constructed to a very high standard. Most streams are bridged, boardwalks cover boggy areas and the very steep sections have steps. It is a moderate walking track that takes three to four days to complete.

The Kepler Track is also home to the Kepler Challenge, an annual running race that traverses the whole 60 kilometres (37 mi), which the winners complete in less than five hours.

== History ==
Māori legend has it that Rākaihautū, the legendary leader of the Māori migration canoe Uruao, is said to have named the great lakes while exploring the interior of the South Island. During a period of wet weather, his party found a large and beautiful lake which they named Te Ana Au, meaning cave of rain, and just south of it another lake which Rākaihautū named Roto Ua, the lake where rain is constant, today known as Lake Manapouri. The Kepler is situated between the two lakes.

Richard Henry, Fiordland's first ranger, lived at the southern end of Lake Te Anau for many years and often explored the Kepler area. Surveyor James McKerrow named the range after the 17th-century German astronomer Johannes Kepler.

Early tracks up onto Mount Luxmore were cut by Jack Beer to provide summer grazing for his sheep. Many tracks in New Zealand have evolved from Māori trails or pioneer exploration routes.

The idea for the track was first proposed by Alf Excell and Les Henderson. In 1984 in preparation for the National Parks Centennial in 1988, the National Parks Authority (now Department of Conversation) asked all New Zealand National Parks Boards to propose suitable projects to celebrate the Centennial. Project funds would come from the New Zealand Tourist and Publicity Department.

Alf Excell and Les Henderson, two members of the Fiordland National Park Board, came up with the idea of a track they called the “Around the Mountain Walk”. The track would join two existing tracks, going from Te Anau Lake control structure joining with the track to the Luxmore Mountain Meadows and skirt northern face of Luxmore and take a zig-zag down to the Iris Burn Valley. It would then travel down the Iris Burn Valley to Lake Manapouri and join with the track from Shallow Bay to Rainbow Reach Bridge and a new track from the bridge along the western side of the Upper Waiau back to the Te Anau Control Structure.

The project was accepted and the Kepler track was established in 1988 and opened in February of that year as a Great Walk as part of the Fiordland National Park Centennial celebrations. It was designed to ease the strain on the popular Milford and Routeburn Tracks. The track had a considerable contribution from the International Expedition Operation Raleigh during 1986/87 when expeditions from around the world constructed much of the walkways and the Iris Burn and Mount Luxmore huts. The caves at Mt Luxmore were also mapped and Mount Raleigh was named above the Iris Burn.

== Tramping ==
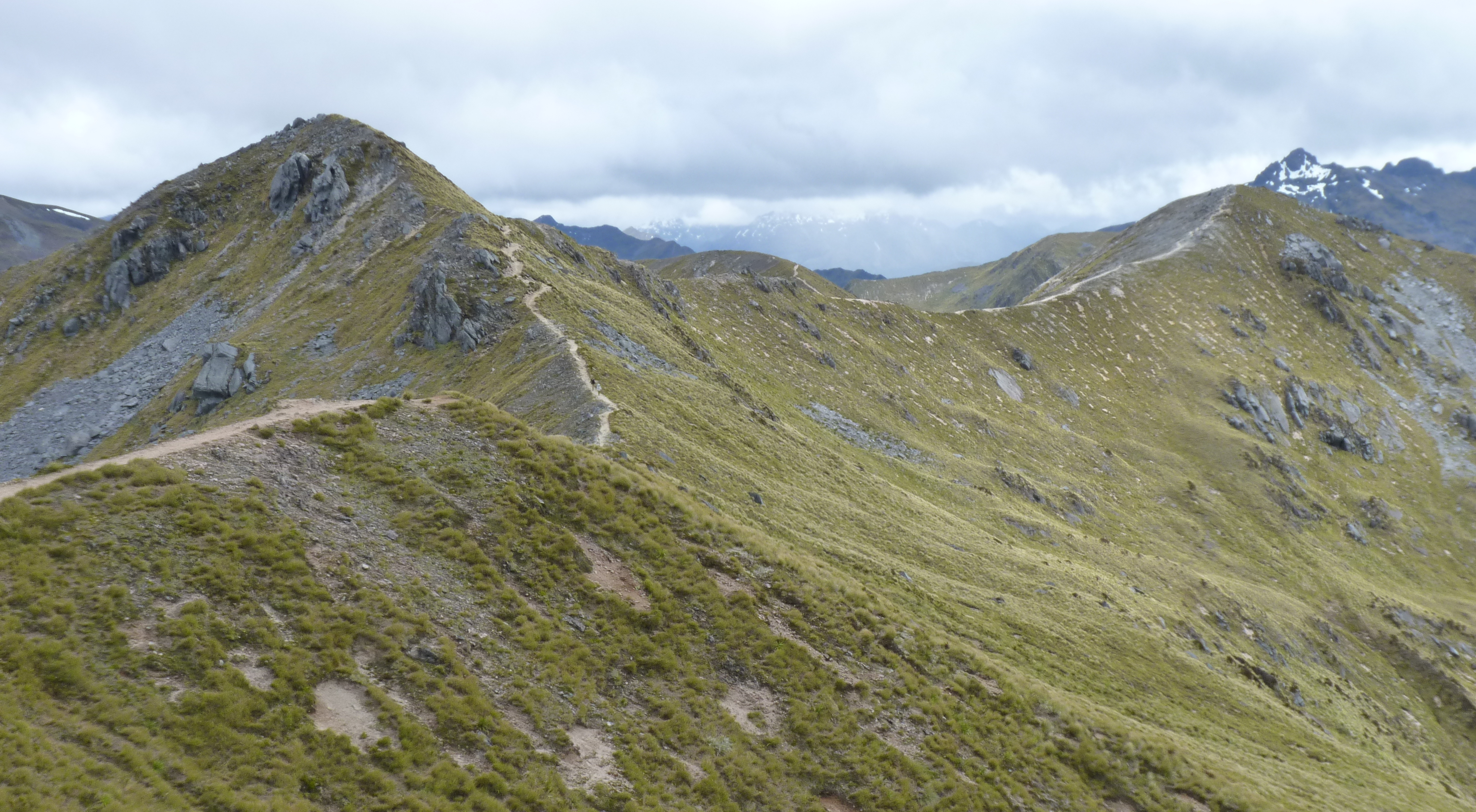

The track is usually recommended to be walked in this route from the Lake Te Anau Control Gates but it can be walked in either direction. If time is short, the track can be shortened to three days by exiting or entering at the Rainbow Reach swing bridge using a car or bus.

While it is possible to complete the Kepler whilst camping this requires a 10-hour hike between Brod Bay and Iris Burn campsites. A much easier option is to stay at Luxmore Hut on the first night, then continue on to Iris Burn campsite for the second night, completing the track to Rainbow Reach on day three. New Zealand Mountain Safety Council's video on the Kepler Track

The price and availability of accommodation varies considerably between the peak season (summer) and the off-season (winter).

Kepler Track Typical 3 and 4 Day Walks
Place	Day (Full)	Day (Short)	Distance	Time	Description
Lake Te Anau Control Gates; 45°26′30.5″S 167°41′23″E	1		5.6 km (3.5 mi)	1.5 hours	The track follows the shores of Lake Te Anau in beech forest to sandy Brod Bay where camping is permitted, and where it is possible to enter or exit the track by an arranged shuttle boat.
Brod Bay	1		5.6 km (3.5 mi)	1.5 hours	The track follows the shores of Lake Te Anau in beech forest to sandy Brod Bay where camping is permitted, and where it is possible to enter or exit the track by an arranged shuttle boat.
Brod Bay	1	1	8.2 km (5.1 mi)	3.5 – 4.5 hours	From Brod Bay, the track climbs up past limestone bluffs (at 747 m or 2,451 ft) to Luxmore Hut (1,085 m or 3,560 ft) on Mt Luxmore. A short walk from the hut leads to a cave, one of about 30 in the area, of which many are still unexplored.
Luxmore Hut	1	1	8.2 km (5.1 mi)	3.5 – 4.5 hours	From Brod Bay, the track climbs up past limestone bluffs (at 747 m or 2,451 ft) to Luxmore Hut (1,085 m or 3,560 ft) on Mt Luxmore. A short walk from the hut leads to a cave, one of about 30 in the area, of which many are still unexplored.
Luxmore Hut	2	2	14.6 km (9.1 mi)	5 – 6 hours	A gradual climb from the hut to Luxmore Saddle (1,400 m or 4,600 ft) which is the highest point on the main trail, offering extensive views of the park. There is an opportunity to climb to the peak of Mount Luxmore (1,472 m or 4,829 ft) for a 360 degree view including Lake Te Anau. Emergency shelters are located at Forrest Burn and Hanging Valley – though overnight stays are expressly forbidden, except in an emergency. The path then follows a long, open ridge toward the Iris Burn and descends via a series of zigzags into a hanging valley. The track descends through forest, and provides a view of a large natural landslide. The Iris Burn Hut (497 m or 1,631 ft) is sited in a large tussock clearing 1.5 km (0.93 mi) from Iris Burn waterfall.
Iris Burn Hut	2	2	14.6 km (9.1 mi)	5 – 6 hours	
Iris Burn Hut	3	3	16.2 km (10.1 mi)	5 – 6 hours	The track climbs over a low saddle and wanders through mixed forest to the large slip formed during heavy rain in January 1984. The track sidles through a gorge to come out on river flats near the mouth of the Iris Burn. It follows the lakeshore around Shallow Bay to Moturau Hut, situated beside a beach with views of Lake Manapouri.
Moturau Hut; 45°28′54″S 167°36′37″E	3	3	16.2 km (10.1 mi)	5 – 6 hours	The track climbs over a low saddle and wanders through mixed forest to the large slip formed during heavy rain in January 1984. The track sidles through a gorge to come out on river flats near the mouth of the Iris Burn. It follows the lakeshore around Shallow Bay to Moturau Hut, situated beside a beach with views of Lake Manapouri.
Moturau Hut; 45°28′54″S 167°36′37″E	4	3	6 km (3.7 mi)	1.5 – 2 hours	This short section crosses many small streams, before running next to the Waiau River until it reaches the Rainbow Reach swing bridge, where there is a carpark, and tramper bus services.
Rainbow Reach Swing Bridge; 45°29′27″S 167°39′45″E	4	3	6 km (3.7 mi)	1.5 – 2 hours	This short section crosses many small streams, before running next to the Waiau River until it reaches the Rainbow Reach swing bridge, where there is a carpark, and tramper bus services.
Rainbow Reach Swing Bridge; 45°29′27″S 167°39′45″E	4		9.5 km (5.9 mi)	2.5 – 3.5 hours	The undulating track here traverses mixed forest and crosses many small streams, arriving back at the Control Gates.
Lake Te Anau Control Gates	4		9.5 km (5.9 mi)	2.5 – 3.5 hours	The undulating track here traverses mixed forest and crosses many small streams, arriving back at the Control Gates.

The Lake Te Anau Control Gates are approximately 4.6 kilometres (2.9 mi) from the DOC visitors centre in Te Anau.

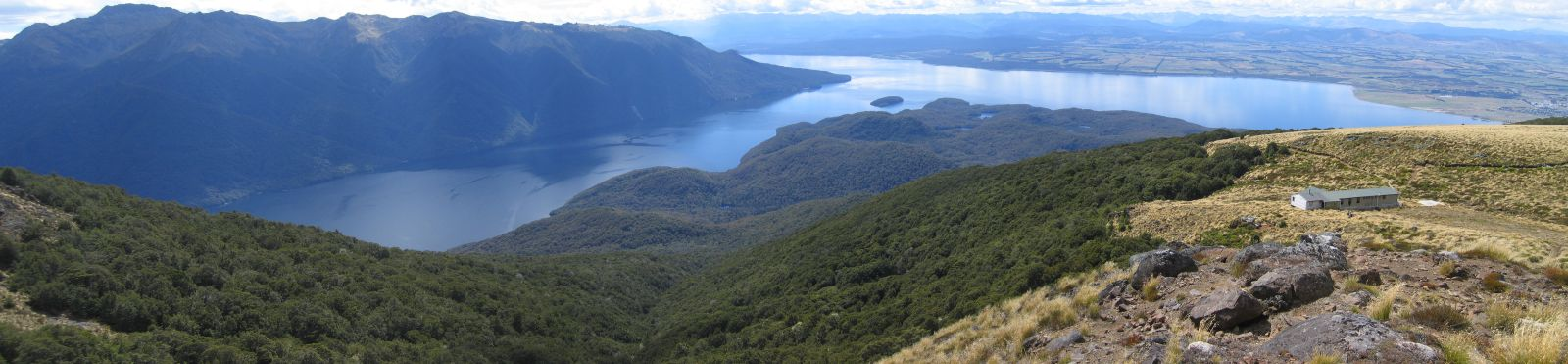
Luxmore Hut and Lake Te Anau from the Kepler Track

== Location ==
The Kepler Track is located in the south west of the South Island. The nearest townships of Te Anau (4.6 km or 2.9 mi away) and Manapouri have a full range of accommodation and shops catering to all tramping needs.

The Kepler Track is accessed from the Lake Te Anau Control Gates, either by road or a 50-minute walk from the Fiordland National Park Visitor Centre in Te Anau, or over the swingbridge across the Waiau River at Rainbow Reach, a ten-minute (12 km or 7.5 mi) drive from Te Anau.

Shuttle buses also operate during the summer months to entry and exit points on the track and a scheduled boat service provides access to Brod Bay.

== Huts and campsites ==
=== Brod Bay campsite ===
This campsite is situated on Lake Te Anau and is the first campsite for hikers who started the trek from the control gates.

=== Luxmore Hut ===
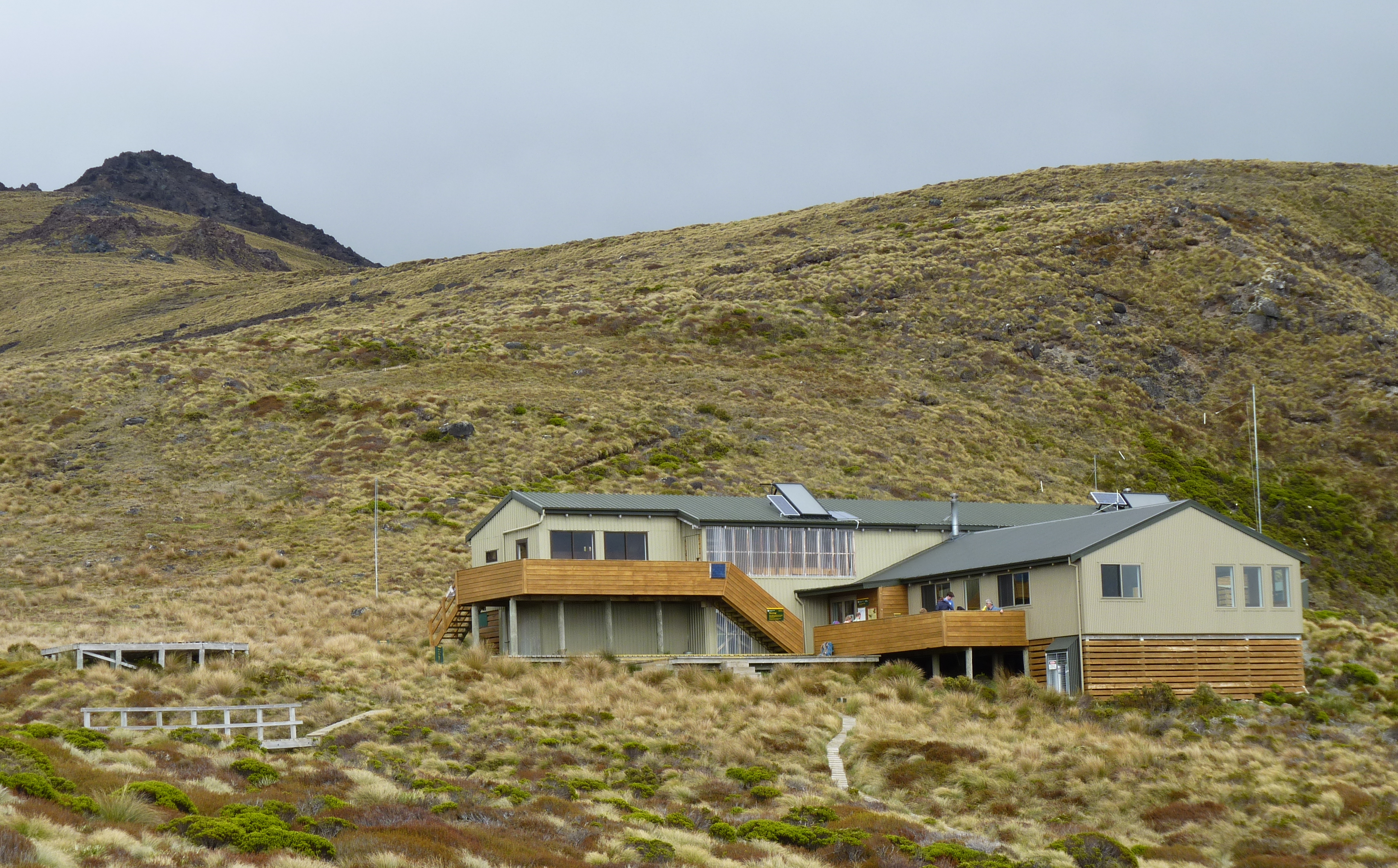
Luxmore Hut

This hut sleeps 54 in bunk style rooms with mattresses and is equipped with stoves and tables inside for cooking as well as an outside deck area. There is a large bunk room and a smaller bunk room that faces Lake Te Anau. Camping is not permitted at this site. The Luxmore Caves, an extensive cave system are located nearby.

=== Iris Burn Hut ===
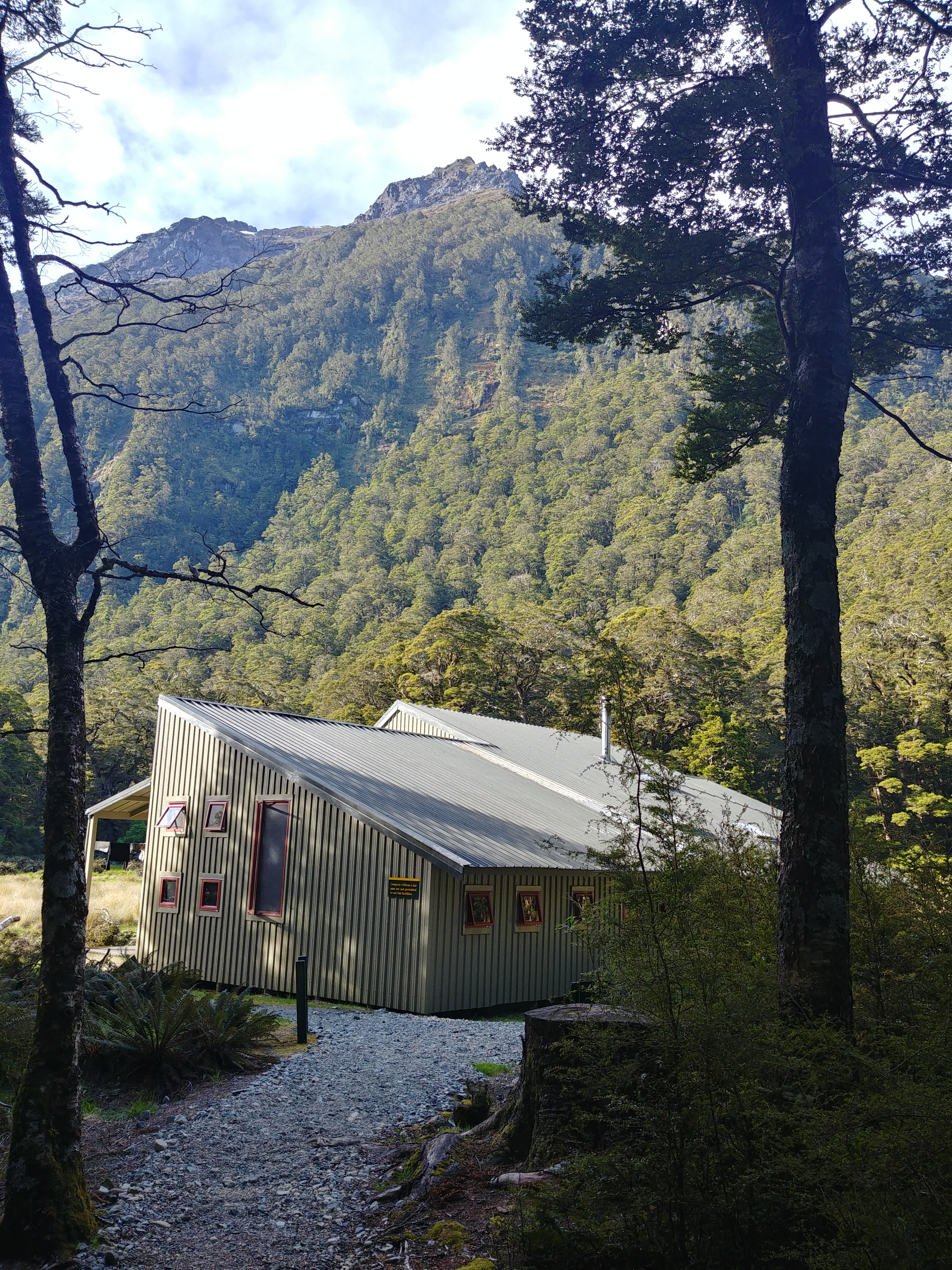
Iris Burn Hut

This hut sleeps 50 in 3 separate bunk rooms with mattresses and provides the same amenities as the Luxmore. The hut is situated near a small field where there is a small river. About a 20-minute walk from the hut is the Iris Burn Waterfall where swimming is possible.

=== Iris Burn campsite ===
There are several campsites provided in the shaded area of the trees near the hut and by the stream. It has been advised to not camp in the field as the Kea (alpine parrots) are known to pester tents that are situated in the field.

=== Moturau Hut ===
Situated on Lake Manapouri, this hut sleeps 40 in bunk beds with mattresses. In summer swimming in the lake and outdoor picnic tables are available.

=== Logistics ===
Like most of New Zealand's Great Walks, huts must generally be booked through the Department Of Conservation (DOC) New Zealand in advance. Showers and waste collection are not provided. It is recommended to bring bug spray in summer months as sand flies are abundant.

Along the trail there are shelters that can be used for day time picnic and rest stop use and a few that are set up to be used in emergencies during the winter months.
