= Luxmoore =

Luxmoore, also Luxmore, is an English language surname. Notable people with these names include:

- Sir Fairfax Luxmoore (1876–1944), British barrister and judge
- Charles Scott Luxmoore (1794–1854), Anglican priest
- Christopher Luxmoore (1926–2014), Bishop of Bermuda
- Ernest Marshall Luxmoore (1883–1972), prominent member of Adelaide Hunt Club
- John Luxmoore or Luxmore (1766–1830), English bishop, father of Charles Luxmoore
- Percy Luxmoore, briefly captain of HMS Malabar (1866)
- Philip Bouverie Luxmoore, remembered in Mount Luxmore on the South Island of New Zealand
- T. J. Luxmore, Canadian ice hockey referee

The Luxmoore family was prominent in Stafford, Dolton
