= Shag River =

Shag River may refer to one of two rivers in southern New Zealand:

- Shag River (Otago)
- Shag River (Fiordland), on Resolution Island
