= Cooper Island (New Zealand) =

Island in New Zealand

Native name: Ao-ata-te-pō
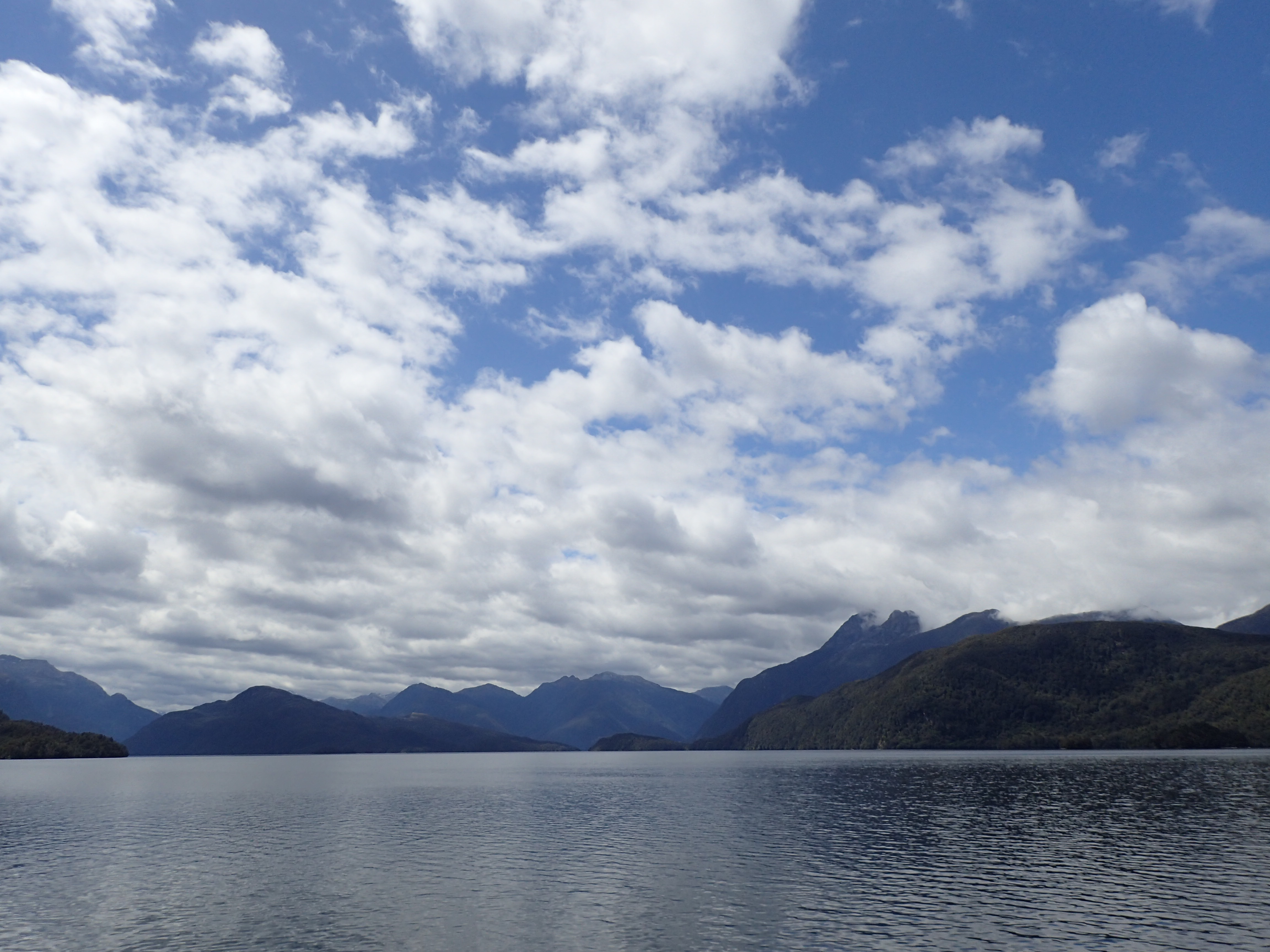
- Cooper Island (high and left of centre) and Long Island (right-hand side)

- Location within New Zealand

Geography
- Location: Fiordland
- Coordinates: 45°44′S 166°50′E
- Area: 17.79 km^{2} (6.87 sq mi)
- Highest elevation: 523 m (1716 ft)

Administration
- New Zealand

Demographics
- Population: 0

Cooper Island, or Ao-ata-te-pō is an island in Fiordland, in the southwest of New Zealand's South Island. It lies within Tamatea / Dusky Sound, east of Long Island. The island is part of Fiordland National Park and is the third-largest island in the park with no possums present.

== See also ==
- Desert island
- List of islands
