= Indian Island (New Zealand) =

Island in Dusky Sound, a southern island of New Zealand

Native name: Mamaku
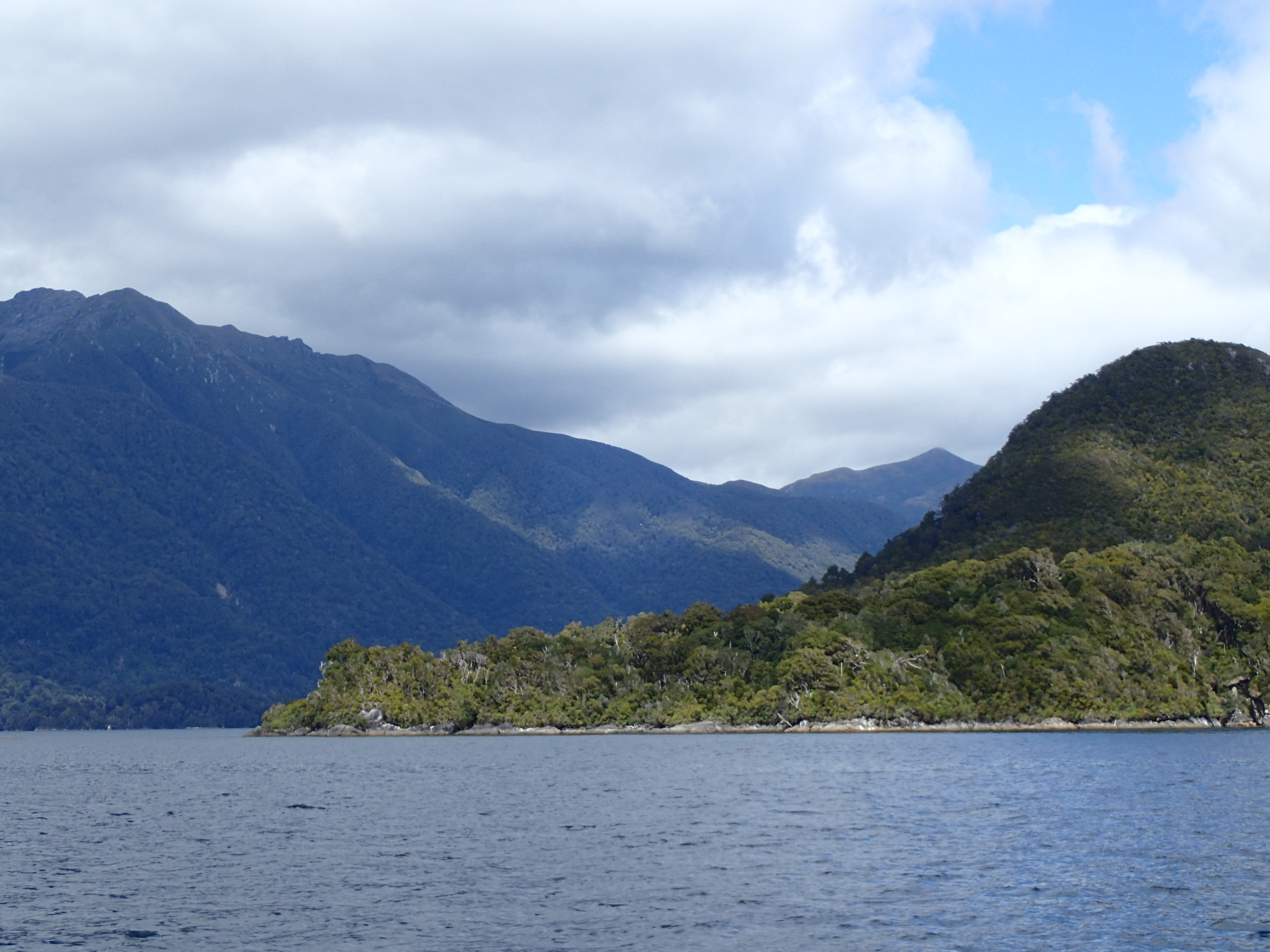
- Eastern End of Indian Island

- Location within New Zealand

Geography
- Location: Dusky Sound
- Coordinates: 45°46′40″S 166°35′20″E
- Area: 1.68 km^{2} (0.65 sq mi)
- Highest elevation: 196 m (643 ft)

Administration
- New Zealand

Demographics
- Population: 0

Indian Island (Māori: Mamaku) is an island in Dusky Sound in Fiordland. Its name stems from first sightings of indigenous people on the island by James Cook in 1773.

The island is situated southeast of Anchor Island and west of Long Island, and is part of Fiordland National Park.

Pest control of introduced animal species such as stoats and rats from 1999 onwards led to the island to be declared pest-free in 2012. The island is one of only nine completely pest-free islands in Fiordland and provides another buffer to Anchor Island, which is critical to the survival of kākāpō.

== See also ==
- List of islands of New Zealand
- Desert island
