= Fiordland National Park =

National park on the South Island of New Zealand

- IUCN category II (national park)
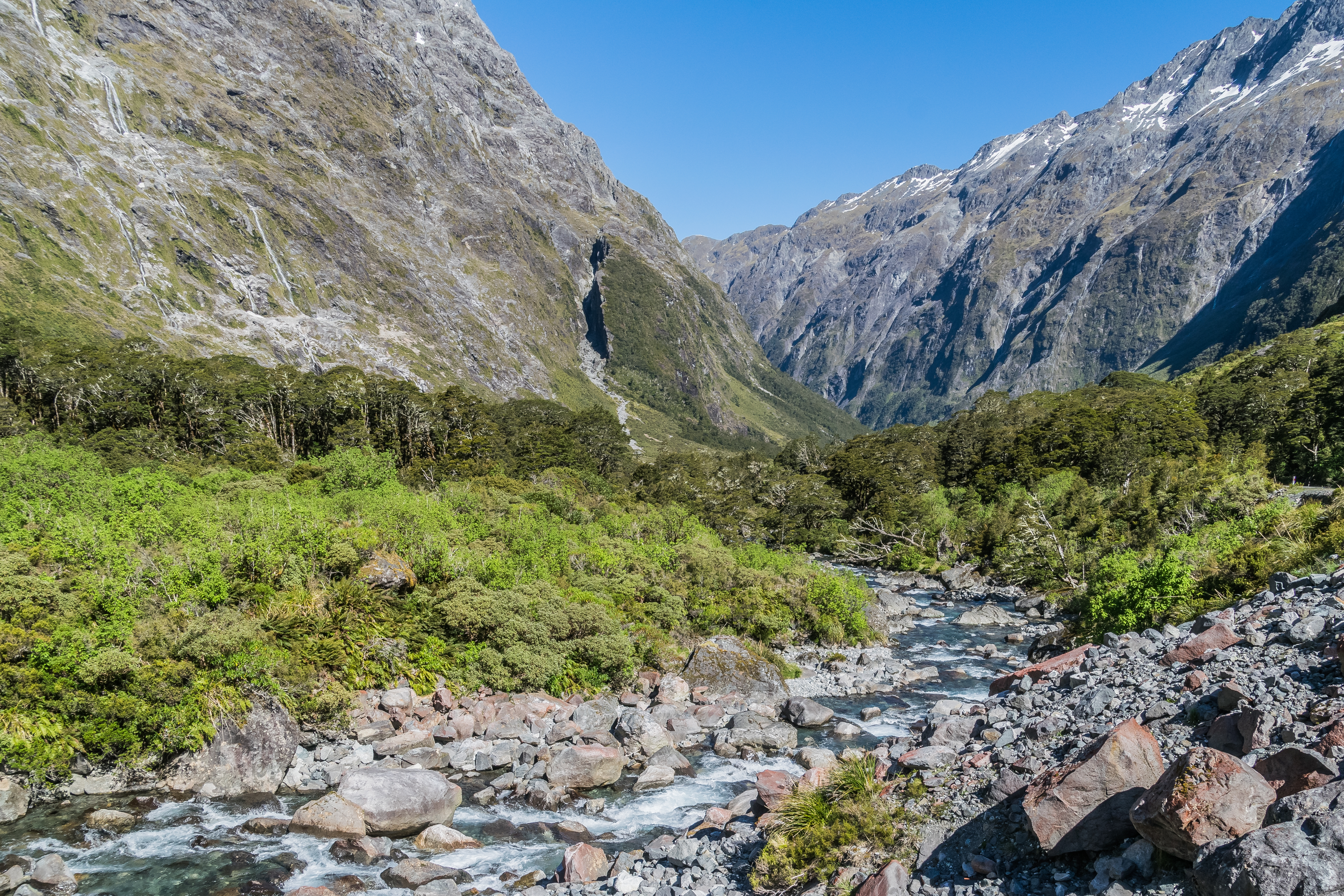
- Hollyford River in 2017
- Interactive map of Fiordland National Park
- Location: Southland, New Zealand
- Nearest town: Te Anau, New Zealand
- Coordinates: 45°25′S 167°43′E
- Area: 12,607 km^{2} (4,868 sq mi)
- Established: 1952
- Governing body: Department of Conservation

UNESCO World Heritage Site
- Official name: Te Wāhipounamu – South West New Zealand
- Type: Natural
- Criteria: vii, viii, ix, x
- Designated: 1990 (14th session)
- Reference no.: 551
- Region: Oceania

Fiordland National Park is a national park in the south-west corner of South Island of New Zealand. It is the largest of the 13 national parks in New Zealand, with an area of 12,607 km^{2} (4,868 sq mi). The park occupies almost half of the area of Te Wāhipounamu, a UNESCO World Heritage Site established in 1990, and is administered by the Department of Conservation (DOC). The park is the largest Dark Sky park in the Southern Hemisphere, and the third largest in the world. The southern ranges of the Southern Alps cover most of Fiordland National Park, combined with the deep glacier-carved valleys.

The park is a refuge for many threatened native animals, ranging from dolphins and bats to reptiles, insects, and endangered species of birds endemic to New Zealand, such as the takahē, mōhua, kākāpō, and southern brown kiwi.

== History ==
=== Māori history ===
One of the earliest settlers on the South Island was the Waitaha people, who are believed to have settled directly on the South Island from Hawaiki on the Uruao canoe. Later migrations of Kāti Māmoe came from the North Island. Similarly, Ngāi Tahu later migrated from the North Island and joined the Kāti Māmoe iwi. The Māori history of Fiordland can be traced back more than 600 years with the creation of Ngāi Tahu. Its fiords, which are waterways, were intended to provide havens along its rugged coastline, which was rich in forests and birds to sustain travellers. Fiordland offered many other resources to maintain groups on their expeditions, such as kākāpō and shellfish.

In Māori mythology, the fiords are created by the craft of Tū Te Rakiwhanoa, who carved indentations into the coastline to make it habitable. But habitation in Fiordland has always been thin, although Māori made seasonal visits here to fish, hunt, and collect greenstone from Milford Sound. Tribal groups found sanctuary here, living amid the penguins and seals. In Māori mythology, a legend named Hine-nui-te-pō created sandflies to keep people from becoming idle in Fiordland to protect people from its "beauty".

=== European history ===
Captain James Cook, a British explorer, circumnavigated the South Island with his crew of HMS Endeavour in March 1770. They advanced towards the southwest Fiordland but sailed away since it was late. Although they did not enter Dusky Sound on their first voyage to New Zealand, Cook noted the presence of a promising harbour here, and gave it the name "Dusky Bay". They managed to shelter at Dusky Sound during their second voyage aboard HMS Resolution, and Cook met some Māori families while they were sheltered here. Andreas Reischek, an Austrian naturalist, explored Fiordland in the late 1880s. His collection of bird skins from the area was destroyed after being waterlogged as a result of inadequate stowage aboard the Stella. Despite his contributions to the study of New Zealand natural history, Reischek is remembered for his theft of taonga from Māori hosts.

10,000 square kilometres (3,900 sq mi) of Fiordland were set aside as a national reserve in 1904, following suggestions by then-future Prime Minister Thomas Mackenzie and Southland Commissioner of Crown Lands, John Hay, that the region should be declared a national park.

The area had already become a destination for trampers, following the opening up of the Milford Track from Lake Te Anau to Milford Sound in 1889 by New Zealand explorers Quintin McKinnon and Donald Sutherland, which received significant publicity from a 1908 article in the London Spectator describing it as the "Finest Walk in the World".

The Fiordland "public reserve" was created as a park administered by the Department of Lands and Survey, in practical terms, similar to a National Park. The only two officially named "national parks" in New Zealand at the time, Tongariro National Park and Egmont National Park, were administered by park boards. Consolidation of park management led to the National Parks Act of 1952, which brought Fiordland National Park into the fold, formally making it the third National Park in New Zealand. Fiordland National Park's establishment in the early 1950s occurred at the same time with the opening of the Homer Tunnel for public use, which provided road access to Milford Sound.

== Geography ==
During the cooler past, glaciers carved many deep fiords, the most famous (and most visited) of which is Milford Sound / Piopiotahi. Other notable fiords include Doubtful Sound / Patea and Tamatea / Dusky Sound. The retreat of the glaciers after the ice age left behind U-shaped valleys with sheer cliffs, and as a result, Fiordland's coast is steep and crenellated, with some of the 15 fiords reaching as far as 40 kilometres (25 mi) inland.

The southern ranges of the Southern Alps cover most of Fiordland National Park and, combined with the deep glacier-carved valleys, present a highly inaccessible landscape. At the northern end of the park, the Darran Mountains contain several peaks rising to over 2,500 metres (8,200 ft), with views of Mount Aspiring / Tititea to the north in the neighbouring Mount Aspiring National Park. Further south, the Franklin Mountains, Stuart Mountains, and Murchison Mountains reach around 2,000 metres (6,600 ft), with the peaks diminishing in height from north to south. The Kepler, Dingwall, Kaherekoau, Princess, and Cameron Mountains further south only reach 1,500–1,700 metres (4,900–5,600 ft).

The glacial carving has cut off islands from the mainland, leaving two large uninhabited offshore islands, Secretary Island and Resolution Island, as well as many smaller ones. Although these glaciers are long-gone, a few small glaciers and permanent snow fields remain, with the southernmost glacier situated below Caroline Peak.

Several large lakes lie wholly or partly within the park's boundaries, notably Lake Te Anau and Lake Manapouri, both on the western boundary of the national park, as well as the southern lakes Lake Monowai, Lake Hauroko, and Lake Poteriteri. All of these lakes exhibit the topography typical of glacier-carved valleys, with Lake Te Anau and Lake Manapouri in particular having several arms that are similar in appearance to the fiords on the west coast of the park.

The Sutherland Falls, to the southwest of the Sound on the Milford Track, are among the world's highest waterfalls. Other tall waterfalls in the park include Browne Falls, Humboldt Falls, Lady Alice Falls, and Bowen Falls, as well as countless temporary waterfalls in the fiords that come to life after rainfall.

=== Climate ===
Prevailing westerly winds blow moist air from the Tasman Sea onto the mountains; the cooling of this air as it rises produces a large amount of rainfall, exceeding seven metres in many parts of the park. This supports the temperate rainforests of the Fiordland temperate forests ecoregion.

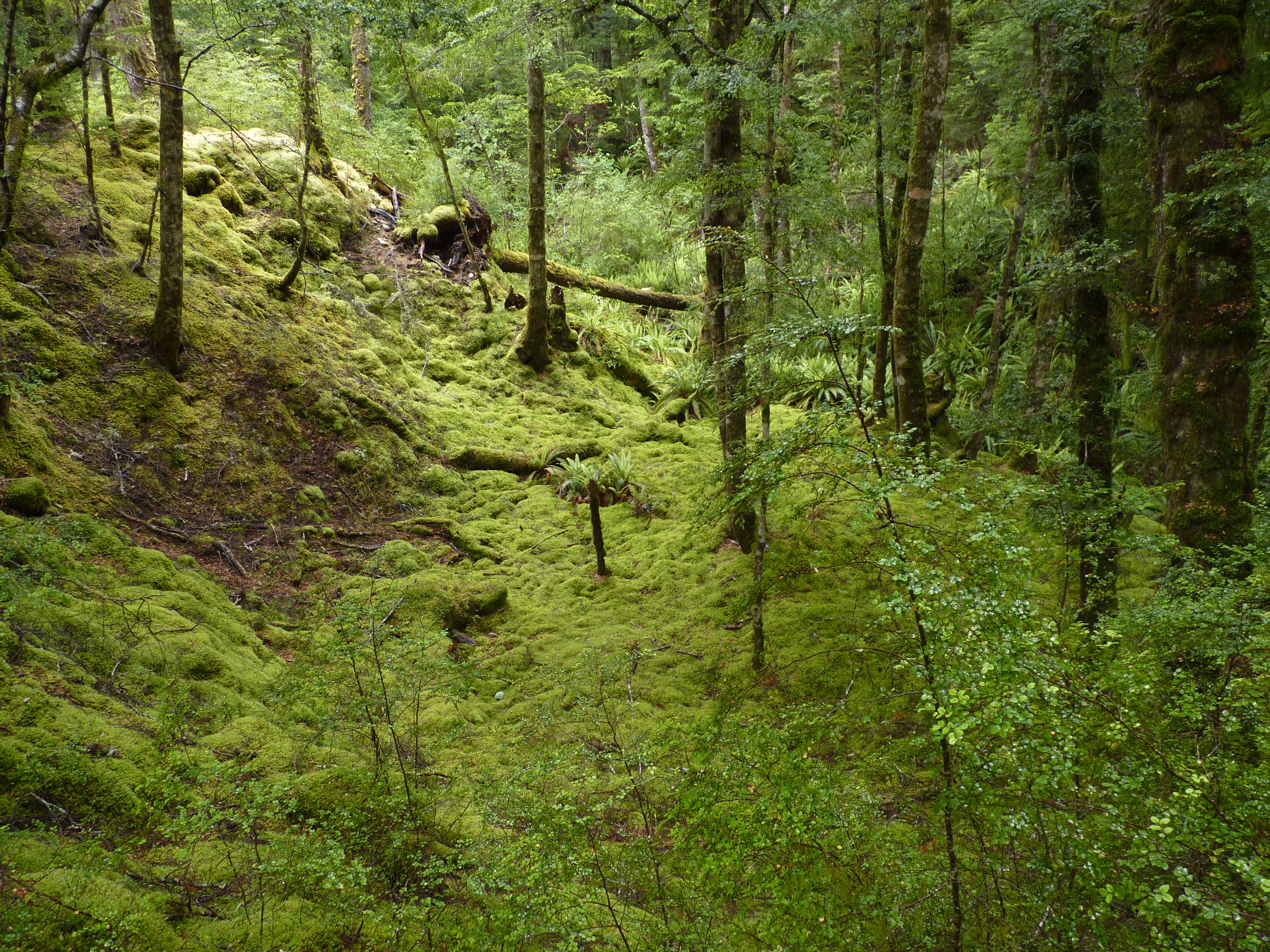
Understory with shrubs, ferns and mosses

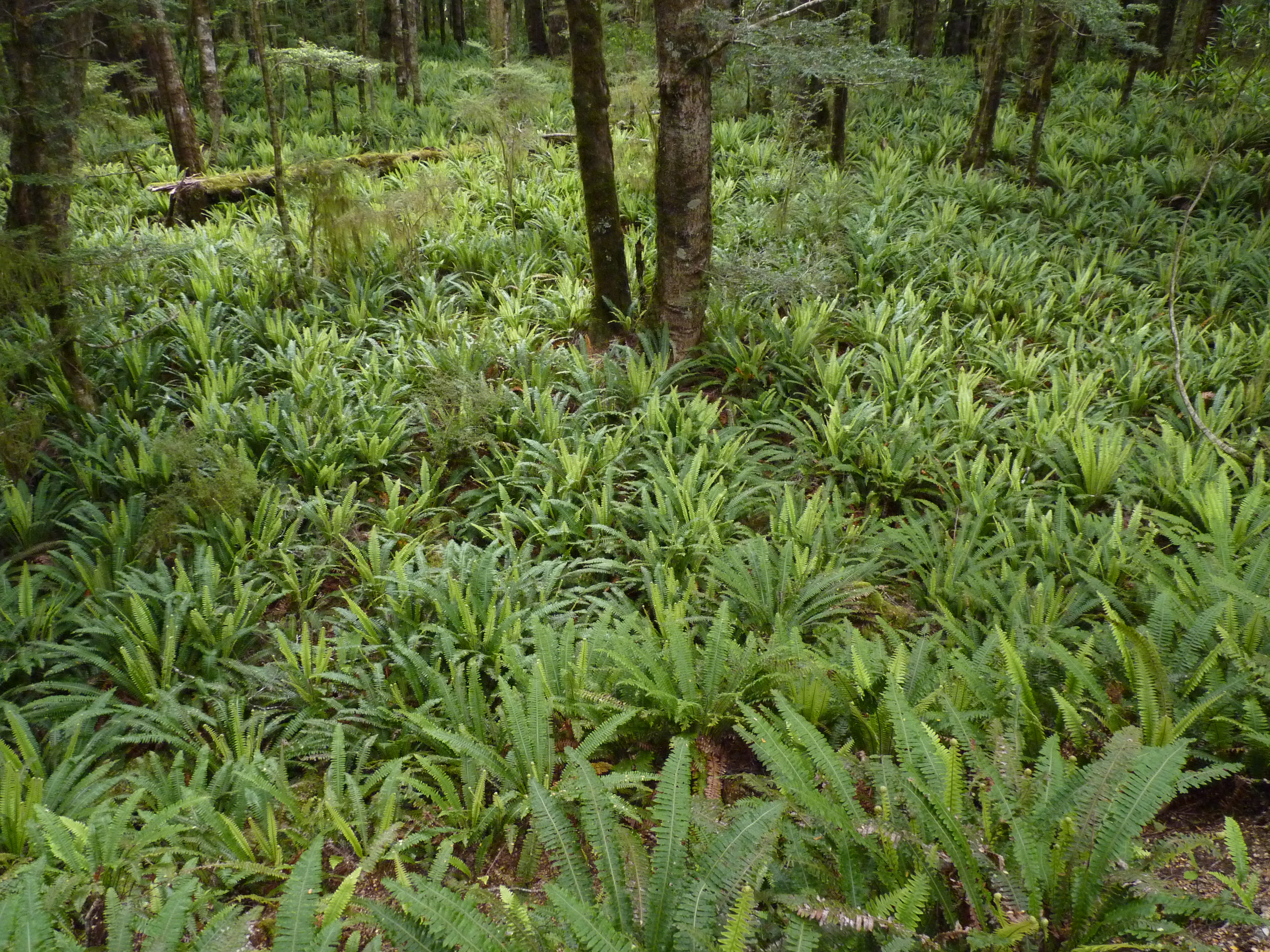
Crown ferns

== Ecology ==
=== Flora ===
Fiordland National Park contains the largest area of unmodified vegetation in New Zealand. The dense forests, often clinging to steep valley sides, comprise mostly silver beech and mountain beech, but also podocarps. A large variety of shrubs and ferns, often dominated by crown fern, make up a rich understory of plants, with the forest floor covered in mosses and liverworts. The abundant vegetation is supported by the high rainfall, but continues to be damaged by introduced species such as red deer and possum.

=== Fauna ===
The park is also a significant refuge for many threatened native animals, including dolphins, bats, reptiles, insects, and birds. Among the birds are several endangered species endemic to New Zealand, such as the takahē, mōhua (Yellowhead), and the critically endangered kākāpō, the only flightless parrot in the world. The vulnerable Fiordland crested penguin and southern brown kiwi are also almost exclusively found within the park.

The special nature of the Fiordland area for conservation was recognised in the late 1890s by Richard Henry, pioneering the transfer of threatened species such as kākāpō and kiwi to islands in Dusky Sound. Conservation work and management of endangered species continues via many programmes by the Department of Conservation. The Takahē Recovery Programme ensures the survival of the last wild population of takahē. This unique bird, the largest living member of the rail family, was once thought to be extinct. After the rediscovery of the takahē in the Murchison Mountains in 1948, a special area of 500 square kilometres (190 sq mi) was set aside in Fiordland National Park for its conservation, and the population reached 300 birds in 2016. Although the National Park comprises 15% of New Zealand's conservation estate, it receives less than 1% of the Department of Conservation's pest-control budget.

Several offshore islands belonging to Fiordland National Park are dedicated sanctuaries for threatened native species:

- Anchor Island - kākāpō, little spotted kiwi, tīeke (saddleback), mōhua
- Bauza Island - tīeke
- Breaksea Island - tīeke, mōhua, knobbled weevil, Fiordland skink
- Chalky Island - Te Kakahu skink, tīeke, mōhua, kākāpō, little spotted kiwi, orange-fronted kākāriki
- Coal Island - tokoeka (Haast brown kiwi), mōhua
- Indian Island
- Passage Islands
- Resolution Island - New Zealand rock wren, mōhua, tīeke, knobbled weevil
- Secretary Island - Fiordland crested penguin, kiwi/tokoeka, rock wren, kōkako, takahē, mōhua, endemic mistletoe species

Mōhua and tokoeka (Haast brown kiwi) have also been released on Pomona Island in Lake Te Anau, and the Eglinton Valley contains significant populations of long-tailed bats.

In addition to these sanctuaries, there are also three sizeable possum-free islands in the fiords of the national park: Cooper Island and Long Island in Dusky Sound / Tamatea, and Great Island in Taiari / Chalky Inlet. However, these islands are still occupied by stoats, rats, or mice, compromising their suitability as bird sanctuaries.

== Conservation and human interaction ==
Fiordland became the scene of one of New Zealand's most significant conservation debates when, in the 1960s, it was proposed to raise the level of Lake Manapouri to assist hydro-electricity production at West Arm. The ensuing battle resulted in the government ultimately bowing to the weight of petitions and passing a bill in the 1970s that gave the lake statutory protection.

In 1986, Fiordland National Park was individually recognised as a World Heritage Site, and in 1990, together with three other national parks to the north, as part of the Te Wāhipounamu World Heritage Area.

The park's protected area includes all of the islands along its coast, as well as the remote Solander Islands. Although the park's seaward boundary is at the mean high-water mark, 10 adjoining marine reserves protect large areas of water in several fiords. The most recent expansion of Fiordland National Park was the 1999 addition of the 482 square kilometres (186 sq mi) Waitutu Forest. Possible future additions are Big Bay, parts of the Livingston/Eglinton Ranges, and the Dean/Rowallan catchment area.

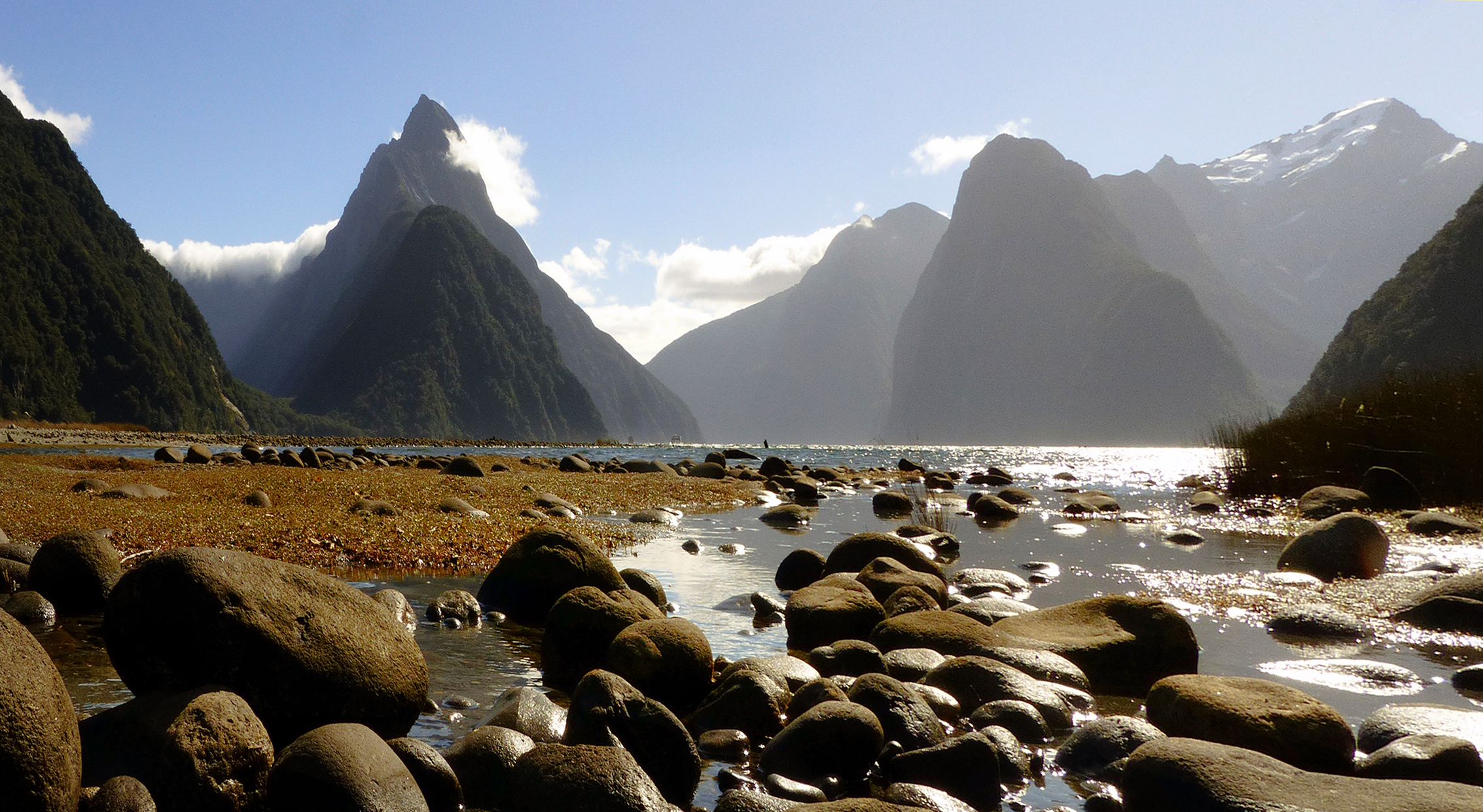
Milford Sound / Piopiotahi: Mitre Peak, the mountain on the left, rises 1692 m above the fiord, Mount Pembroke on the right rises 2,015 m

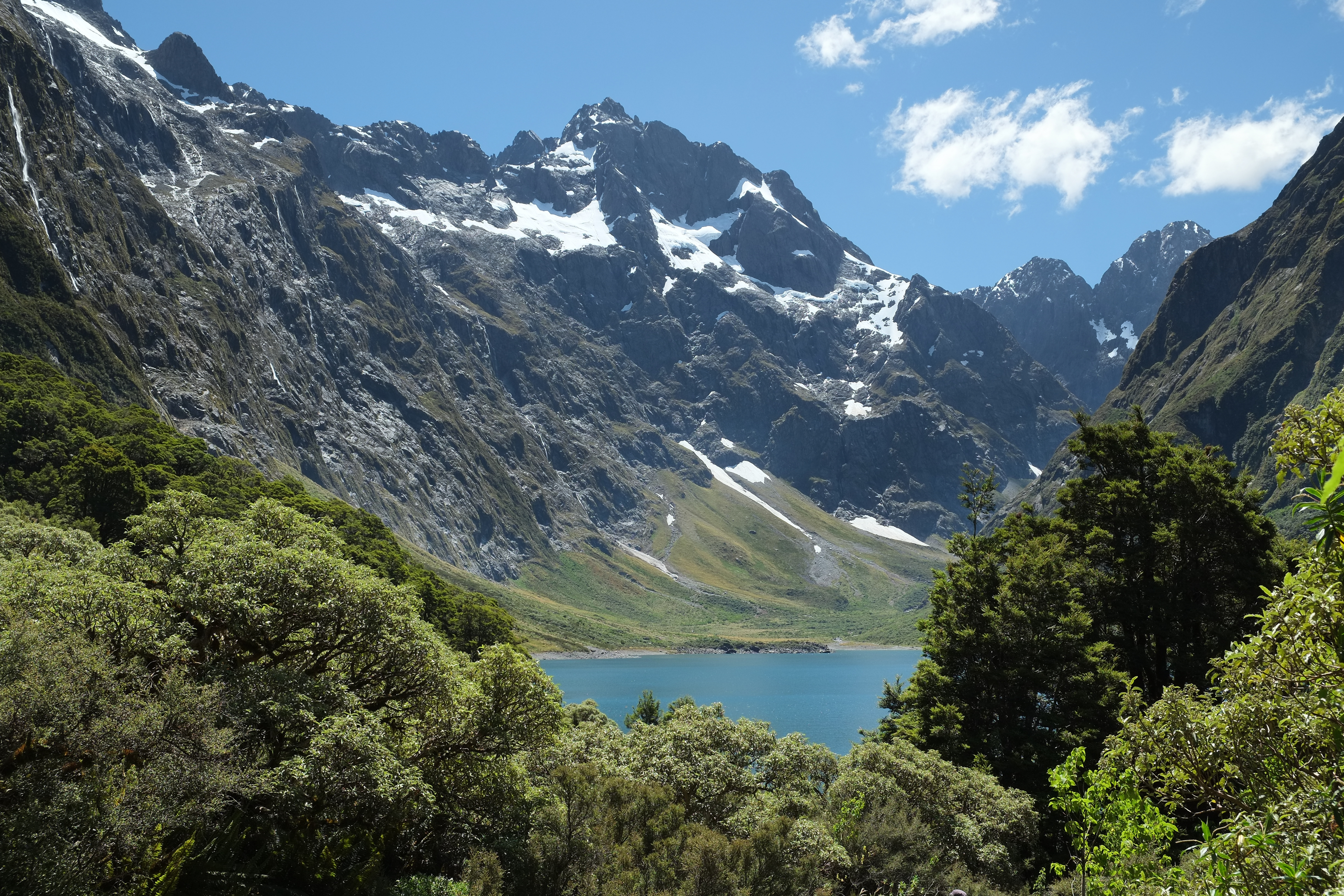
Lake Marian and Mount Crosscut in the Darran Mountains

=== Access ===
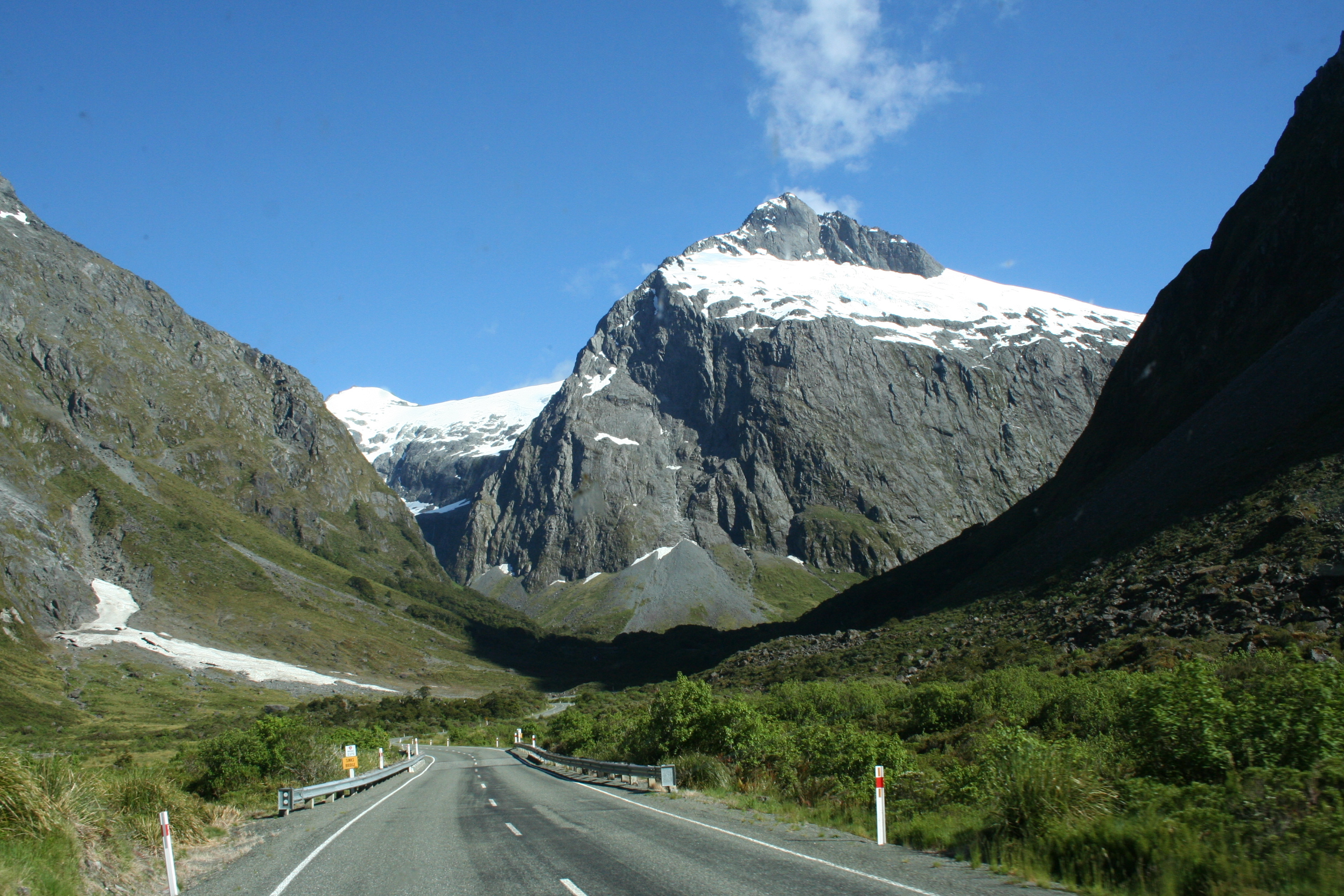
Milford Road east of Homer Pass, featuring Mount Talbot

Main road access into Fiordland National Park is limited to the Milford Road (SH 94), which runs north from Te Anau, skirting the edge of the park before entering the park as the highway joins the valley of the Eglinton River just north of Te Anau Downs. From there, the road continues to the northwest corner of the park, passing through the Hollyford Valley and then through the Homer Tunnel on the descent to the terminus of the road at Milford Sound / Piopiotahi, where there is a large car park, a wharf for the tour boats, and a visitor centre.

A handful of other roads provide access to various entry points into the national park:

- An unsealed side road in the upper Hollyford Valley leads to the start of the Hollyford Track
- State Highway 95 runs close to the park's boundary between Te Anau and Manapouri, with minor side roads to two entry points along the Kepler loop track,
- A narrow winding gravel road runs along the Borland and the Grebe Valley, providing access to three tramping tracks and to a campsite at Lake Manapouri's South Arm,
- A short unsealed access road leads to a campsite at Lake Monowai and the start of two tramping tracks,
- another unsealed road runs up the Lill Burn Valley and to tramping tracks in the area south of Lake Hauroko, including a track to Lake Poteriteri, the largest lake in New Zealand with no road access.

A gravel road not connected to the rest of the public road network links Doubtful Sound / Patea with the western edge of Lake Manapouri via Wilmot Pass. That road is only used by shuttle buses for Doubtful Sound tours from Manapouri, which include a boat transfer across Lake Manapouri and a bus transfer over Wilmot Pass to tour boats awaiting at a small jetty in Doubtful Sound.

Light aircraft and helicopter services link with Milford Sound, which also has a small boat marina.

Parts of Fiordland National Park are a designated Wilderness Area, and aircraft landings are not permitted. The Wilderness Areas award special protection for large tracts of wild land containing natural features of such significance that they are preserved in their natural condition, without any artificial structures or facilities. Entry is usually restricted to foot travel, there are typically no tramping tracks, and in some cases, special permits are required, such as for several offshore islands and the Takahē Specially Protected Area in the Murchison Mountains.

=== Activities ===
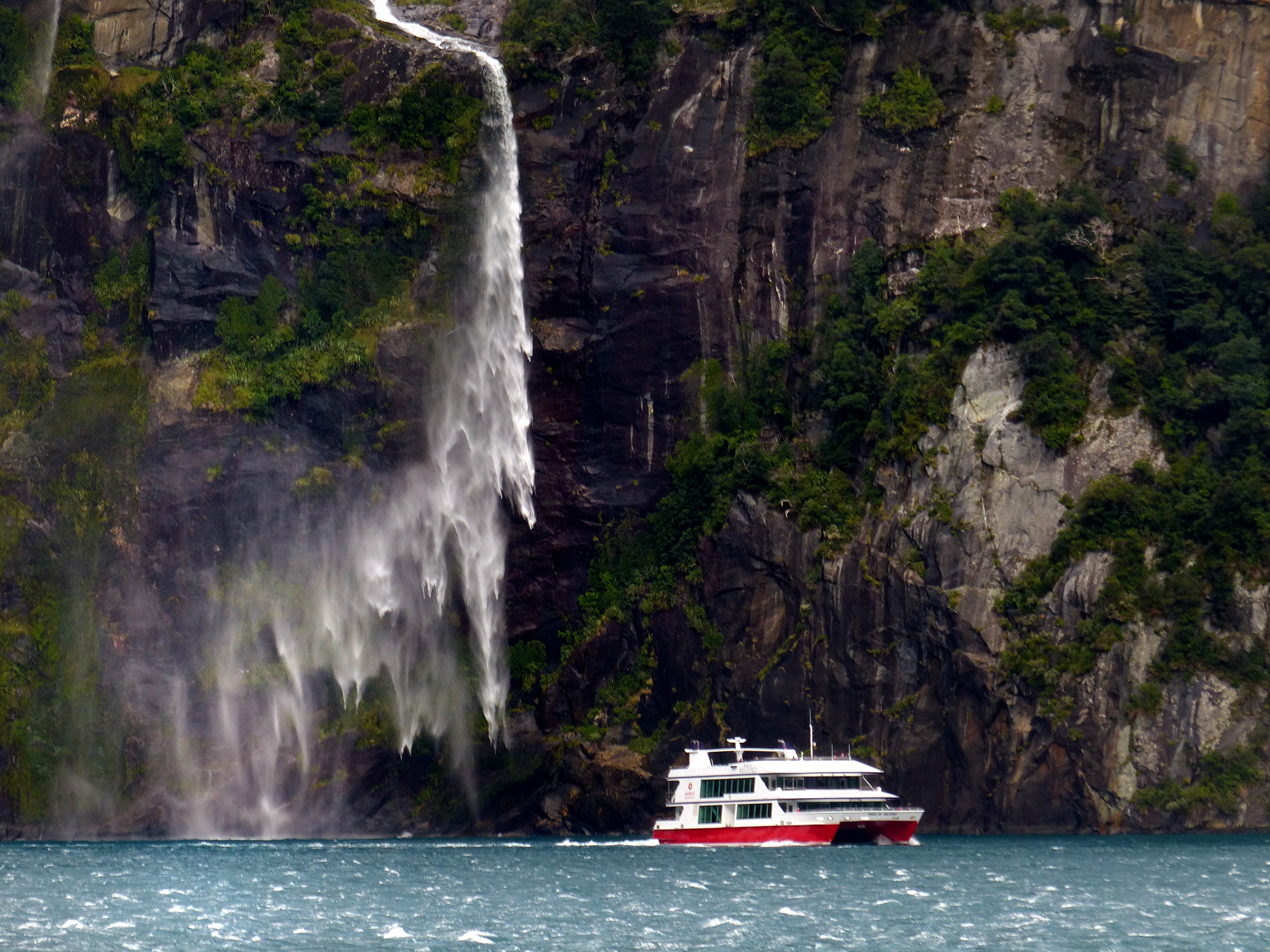
Tour boat in Milford Sound / Piopiotahi

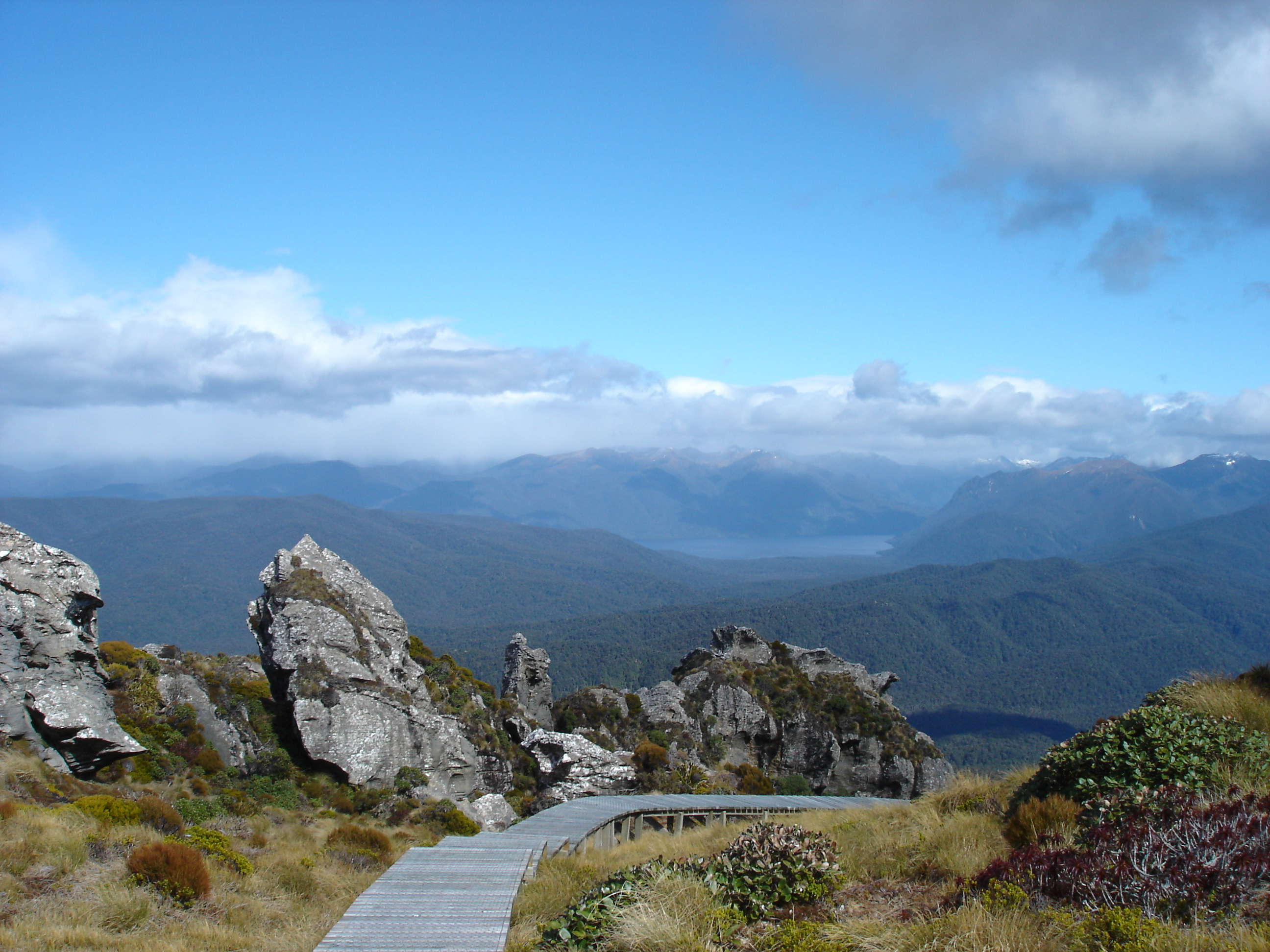
View from Hump Ridge Track towards Lake Poteriteri

Fiordland National Park is the most popular national park in New Zealand for international visitors. Well over half a million people visit the national park every year, however, the visitor numbers are almost exclusively concentrated in the park's northern and eastern corridor from Te Anau to Milford Sound.

Most tourists are drawn to the national park's easily accessible areas, such as Milford Sound, where boat tours of the fiord and kayaking are the most popular activities. Some boat tour packages include a visit to the Milford Discovery Centre & Underwater Observatory. Along the Milford Road from Te Anau, there are also camping grounds and several short walks, some wheelchair accessible. Popular stopping points along the road are at the Mirror Lakes, the Homer Pass area immediately to the east of the tunnel, and The Chasm.

Te Anau, situated on the shores of Lake Te Anau, is the closest town to the national park and offers many accommodation options, along with all the amenities expected of a small town. The only other settlement close to the park is the much smaller Manapouri.

Doubtful Sound also offers boat tours. These day-long tours depart from Manapouri and include a return boat transfer across Lake Manapouri and a bus transfer over Wilmot Pass to get to Doubtful Sound. From Te Anau, boat trips across the lake to the Te Ana-au Caves are available.

Fiordland National Park is also a popular destination for alpine climbers and especially for trampers, with the multi-day Milford, Kepler and Hollyford tracks, and half of the Routeburn Track within the park. The latter three can also be walked in and out as day walks, whereas access to both ends of the Milford Track is only via boat and must be pre-booked, particularly during the summer peak season.

Aside from these major tramping tracks, which also offer guided walks, dozens of lesser known tracks are maintained by the Department of Conservation, ranging from tracks requiring intermediate skills, such as the Hump Ridge Track and the Lake Marian track to advanced multi-day hikes like the Dusky Track and several routes that should only be attempted by experienced trampers. Fiordland is a challenging tramping destination, and given the size of the national park, there are few tracks. Off-track travel by expert trampers often relies on following deer trails. Sandflies, flooding, and poor weather are hazards, and being stranded for a day or two due to flooded river crossings is not uncommon on tracks like the Dusky Track. Trampers on these remote tracks also face three-wire bridges, tree falls, and rough terrain where mud can be knee-deep.

Milford Sound / Piopiotahi, Te Houhou / George Sound, Doubtful Sound / Patea, and Dusky Sound / Tamatea are the only fiords accessible via tracks or routes. Inland, the southern lakes of Lake Monowai and Lake Hauroko have road access to campsites and tracks, and Lake Poteriteri can be reached via a tramping track.

The steep granite peaks of the Darran Mountains are popular with mountain climbers. The park is also a renowned destination for rainbow trout and brown trout fly fishing.

=== Management of invasive species ===
Red deer were introduced to New Zealand in the 1850s, and they subsequently colonised the Fiordland Park area. By the 1920s, the large herds of wild deer in the NZ back country competing with sheep and cattle for feed resulted in pressure on the NZ government from the farming community, and the Internal Affairs department employed deer cullers to shoot deer in an effort to reduce the population indiscriminately. Costs were recouped from the sale of deer hides.

During the early 1960s, an international market for wild venison was established. With no restrictions on hunting, market hunters established themselves in the rugged park country and used pack horses, jetboats, and fixed-wing aircraft to get the carcasses out to market. Experiments with shooting wild deer from helicopters were highly successful and a competitive industry was based on this technique. By the late 1970s, the deer population in Fiordland had been severely reduced, and combined with a flourishing deer farming industry this has reduced the impact of aerial hunting over the national park. Market helicopter-based hunting in Fiordland continues today in a reduced fashion, with the largest market being Germany.

The Department of Conservation also uses helicopters to poison the invasive possum population with aerial dropping of 1080 poison, despite some public opposition.

=== Dark Sky Accreditation ===
In 2026, Fiordland was recognized as an International Dark Sky Park by DarkSky International. The park is the third largest such park in the world, after Greater Big Bend International Dark Sky Reserve and Death Valley National Park, both in North America; and the largest park in the Southern Hemisphere to be certified by the organization. The recognition was championed by the organization's president, Nalayini Brito-Davies, and came after a five-year application and inventory process.

== In popular culture ==
The scenic, rugged landscape is known for its natural beauty, making it a very popular sightseeing and filming location. Milford Sound and areas of Fiordland National Park were used to depict the Misty Mountains during filming of The Lord of the Rings. The area was again used extensively in The Hobbit Trilogy. Parts of the 2017 film Alien: Covenant were filmed in the park, as well as X-Men Origins: Wolverine, Mission: Impossible – Fallout, and The Chronicles of Narnia: The Lion, the Witch and the Wardrobe.

== See also ==
- National parks of New Zealand
- Forest parks of New Zealand
- Regional parks of New Zealand
- Protected areas of New Zealand
- Conservation in New Zealand
- Department of Conservation

== Works cited ==
- Fiordland, National Park (1986). The story of Fiordland National Park : Mountains of Water. Auckland, New Zealand: Department of Lands and Survey, Fiordland National Park. ISBN 0477061400 – via Internet Archive.
