= Mike River =

- Route of the Mike River
- Mouth of the Mike River Mike River (South Island) Mike River (New Zealand)

Location
- Country: New Zealand

Physical characteristics
- Source
  - coordinates: 45°50′41″S 166°52′49″E
- Mouth
  - location: Fanny Bay
  - coordinates: 45°46′29″S 166°51′23″E
  - elevation: 0 m (0 ft)

Basin features
- Progression: Mike River → Fanny Bay → Tamatea / Dusky Sound → Tasman Sea

The Mike River is a river in Fiordland, New Zealand. It rises near Staircase Saddle and drains a number of small lakes, among them Lake Mike and False Lake, into Dusky Sound at Fanny Bay.

== See also ==
- List of rivers of New Zealand
