= Shag River (Fiordland) =

- Route of the Shag River
- Mouth of the Shag River Shag River (Fiordland) (South Island) Shag River (Fiordland) (New Zealand)

Location
- Country: New Zealand

Physical characteristics
- Source
  - coordinates: 45°38′38″S 166°36′19″E
- Mouth
  - location: Goose Cove
  - coordinates: 45°40′38″S 166°33′12″E
  - elevation: 0 m (0 ft)

Basin features
- Progression: Shag River → Goose Cove → Tamatea / Dusky Sound → Tasman Sea

Shag River is a river on Resolution Island in Fiordland, New Zealand. It rises north west of Mount Roa and flows south into the Taumoana (Five Fingers Peninsula) Marine Reserve, part of Tamatea / Dusky Sound.

== See also ==
- List of rivers of New Zealand
