= Seaforth River =

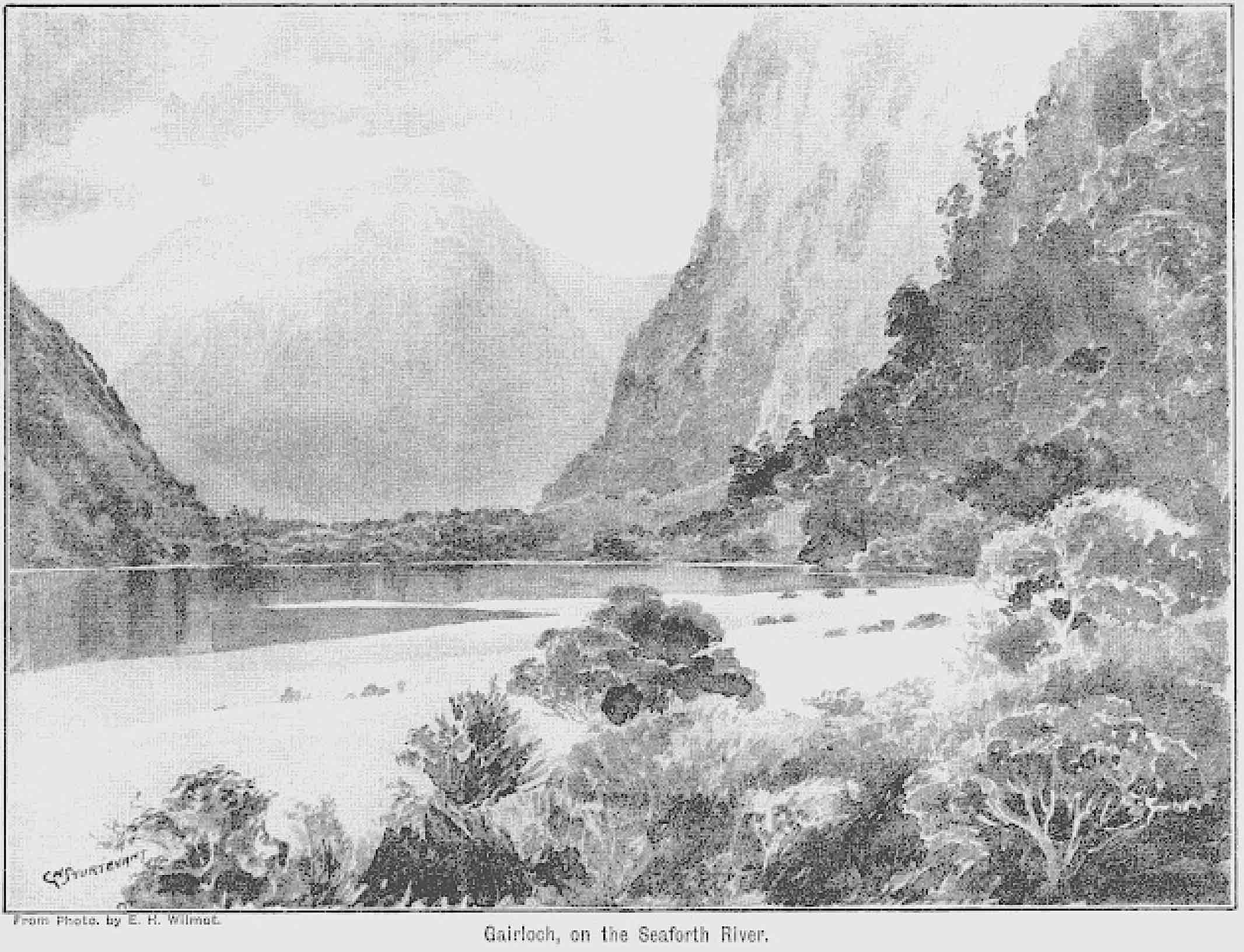
- Gair Loch in 1897, River Seaforth
- Route of the Seaforth River
- Mouth of the Seaforth River Seaforth River (South Island) Seaforth River (New Zealand)

Location
- Country: New Zealand
- Region: Southland
- District: Southland

Physical characteristics
- Source
  - coordinates: 45°31′51″S 167°05′56″E
- Mouth
  - location: Supper Cove, Tamatea / Dusky Sound
  - coordinates: 45°41′51″S 166°57′36″E
  - elevation: 0 metres (0 ft)

Basin features
- Progression: Seaforth River → Supper Cove → Tamatea / Dusky Sound → Tasman Sea
- Tributaries
  - left: Kintail Stream, Bessie Burn, Deadwood Creek, Jane Burn, Roa Stream
  - right: Kenneth Burn, Bishop Burn, Macfarlane Stream, Henry Burn
- Waterbodies: Gair Loch

The Seaforth River is a river in New Zealand, flowing into Dusky Sound. About 9 km (5.6 mi) and 41 m (135 ft) up from Supper Cove in Dusky Sound is Lake Maree. The river rises about another 20 km (12 mi) to the north, on the slopes of the Black Giants, at about 1,300 m (4,300 ft). Like many former British Empire locations, it and its lakes have Scottish names.

The river was first mapped in 1896 by Thomas Mackenzie, who was briefly Prime Minister in 1912. He described cataracts of 10 ft (3.0 m), 25 ft (7.6 m) and 60 ft (18 m) between the Sound and the Loch and named the river after himself. However, in 1897 E. H. Wilmot discovered that the Mackenzie and Seaforth were the same river and removed the former name. The route Mackenzie followed is now part of the Dusky Track. It was thought that few had followed the route until at least 1950.

Carbon dating of beech tree stumps in Lake Maree indicate it was formed when a large rock fall dammed the river during the 1826 earthquake. Near Kintail Hut, Gair Loch is another debris dammed lake. Further debris fell, probably during the 2011 Christchurch earthquake.

Mackenzie described the vegetation as mainly birch, with red-pine, rata, and some totara. He said that there were also ribbon-wood, panax, mikimiki, pepper-tree, mokomoko, tutu, ferns and mosses.

A 1981 survey identified six native fish - Anguilla dieffenbachii, Prototroctes oxyrhynchus, Galaxias maculatus, Galaxias fasciatus, Galaxias brevipinnis and Gobiomorphus huttoni.

Moose were liberated in the valley in 1910, but it is not thought that they survived.

== See also ==
- List of rivers of New Zealand
