= Dusky Sound =

Fiord on New Zealand's South Island

Tamatea / Dusky Sound
- Tamatea (Māori)
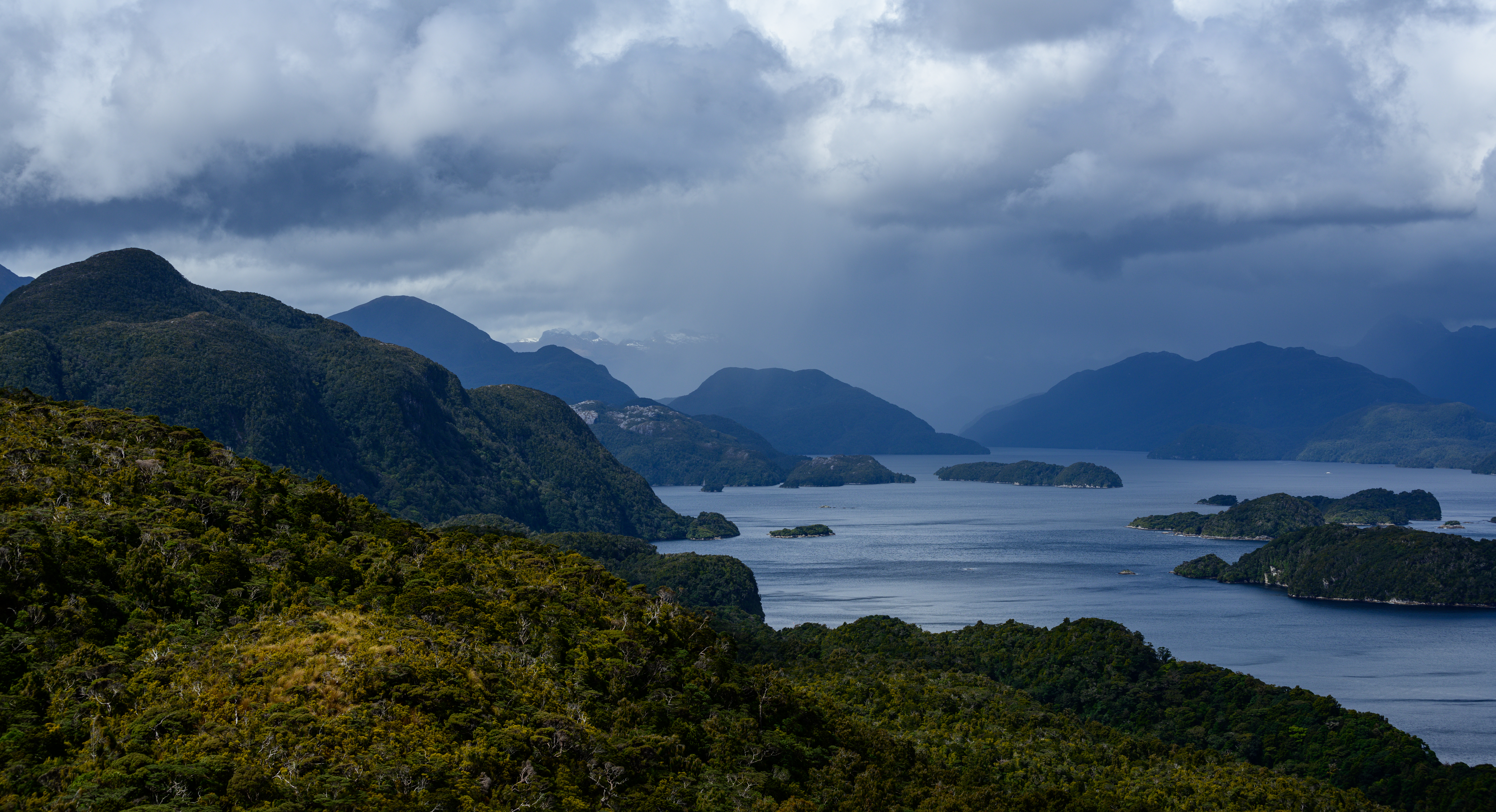
- Tamatea / Dusky Sound from Anchor Island

- Location in New Zealand
- Interactive map of Tamatea / Dusky Sound
- Location: Tasman Sea
- Coordinates: 45.7492°S 166.7866°E
- River sources: Mike River, Seaforth River, Shag River
- Basin countries: New Zealand
- Max. length: 40 km (25 mi)
- Max. width: 8 km (5.0 mi)
- Islands: Anchor Island, Cooper Island, Indian Island, Long Island.

Dusky Sound (officially Tamatea / Dusky Sound) is a fiord on the southwest corner of New Zealand, in Fiordland National Park.

== Geography ==
One of the most complex of the many fiords on this coast, it is also the largest at 40 kilometres in length and eight kilometres wide at its widest point. To the north of its mouth is the large Resolution Island, whose Five Fingers Peninsula shelters the mouth of the sound from the northwest; along the east coast of the island, Acheron Passage connects Dusky Sound with Breaksea Sound, to the north.

Several large islands lie in the sound, notably Anchor Island, Long Island, and Cooper Island. The upper reaches of the sound are steep-sided, and the high precipitation of the region leads to hundreds of waterfalls cascading into the sound during the rainy season. Seals and dolphins are often sighted in the sound's waters and occasionally visited by whales where the area especially nearby Preservation Inlet was one of earliest shore-based whaling ground for southern right whales, while humpback whales show sudden increases. The Seaforth River is the largest of many small rivers and creeks which flow into the sound.

At its mouth, the sound is wide, and is bordered by the Five Fingers Peninsula to the north and by South Cape and Fannin Bay in the south. The south Island's westernmost point, West Cape lies less than 10 kilometres south of the sound's mouth. Immediately inside the sound's mouth lies the large Anchor Island and numerous small islets, among them the Seal, Petrel, and Many Island groups. To the north of Anchor Island lies Resolution Island, and here its coast in indented by a large triangular cove which separates the Five Fingers Peninsula from the rest of the island. A number of small coves punctuate this coast, including Goose Cove and Earshell Cove. Immediately to the southeast of Anchor Island lies the smaller Indian Island.

To the east of Anchor Island, the sound narrows to about five kilometres and splits into two broad channels, separated by the aptly named Long Island, which stretches for some 15 kilometres in length but is only around 2000 metres wide at its widest point. The narrower of the two channels, Cook Channel, lies to the south of Long Island; Bowen Channel lies to the north. Bowen Channel links with Acheron Passage, a north–south channel which separates Resolution Island from the mainland and links with Breaksea Sound to the north.

Inland from Long Island lies Cooper Island, about eight kilometres long and up to five kilometres wide. Dusky Sound narrows to the east of Cooper Island, reaching its end in two small coves, Shark Cove and Supper Cove. The Seaforth River flows into the eastern end of Supper Cove.

=== Important Bird Area ===
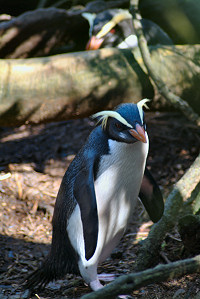
The sound is an important breeding site for Fiordland penguins.

The sound has been identified as an Important Bird Area by BirdLife International because it is a breeding site for Fiordland penguins.

== History ==
It is believed that Māori occasionally camped by the sound's waters while hunting moa in pre-European times.

The inlet was first sighted by Europeans and Captain Cook noted its entrance during his first voyage to New Zealand in 1770. He named it Dusky Bay. On his second expedition he spent two months exploring the sound in March and April of 1773, and used it as a harbour, establishing workshops and an observatory. It is believed his crew brewed the first beer in New Zealand during his stay. He encountered some Māori with whom he had friendly relations. Later they seemed to have disappeared and it was speculated their countrymen had killed them, perhaps for the presents Cook gave them.

A large battle between Ngāti Moi Moi (the lost tribe) and Ngāi Tahu. It is said that Ngāti Moi Moi took their last stand on the beach but were killed.

Cook saw the place as a good harbour for ships entering the Pacific from Europe by the shortest route, highlighting its maritime significance and overlooking its land-locked character. This gave it an unusual prominence in earliest European visits which disappeared as Europeans became more familiar with New Zealand's geography.

Dusky Sound was consequently used as a harbour by other European navigators and merchant ships in the late 18th and early 19th centuries. From 1792 it became a favoured site for seal hunters. Men landed by Captain William Raven from the Britannia in that year built the first European house in New Zealand and the first ship in Australasia, and the first European woman known to have been in New Zealand was recorded as a visitor in 1793. A group of 244 Europeans was stranded in Dusky Sound in 1795, which included two women, Elizabeth Bason and Ann Carey, the first known to have lived ashore. The last of this group left in 1797. The attention of the sealers moved to Bass Strait from 1798 but returned to New Zealand, at Dusky Sound, from 1802. In that year Captain Charles Bishop and George Bass in the Venus spent 14 days in Dusky Sound stripping iron from the hulk of Captain Brampton's old ship the Endeavour. The blacksmith converted the iron into axes which they then used in Tahiti to trade for pork before returning to Sydney by November 1802. Following this, in January 1803, George Bass asked Governor King of New South Wales for a fishing monopoly, from a line bisecting New Zealand from Dusky Sound to Otago Harbour extending south to include the subantarctic Islands. It was not granted, but it indicates the sealers' area of interest and Dusky Sound's place in it. The Matilda under Captain Fowler was on this part of the coast in 1814 when six of his lascar (Indian) seamen absconded in an open boat. It seems it was at Dusky Sound they were set upon by Māori when three were killed and eaten and the others enslaved. One or more of them later lived in what is now the Dunedin district. Sealers continued to visit until the late 1820s when the second sealing boom faded.

An attempt was made in 1903 to construct a road from Dusky Sound to Lake Manapouri, but it was never completed, terminating abruptly at Bishop Burn, on the western side of Loch Maree.

In December 2019, the name of the fiord was officially altered to Tamatea / Dusky Sound.

== Access ==
Access to the sound is by sea or air only, with no roads reaching the coast at this point. However, the Dusky Track stretches to the upper reaches of the sound, at Supper Cove, from lakes Manapouri and Hauroko.

== See also ==
- Tramping in New Zealand
