= Long Island (Southland) =

Island in New Zealand

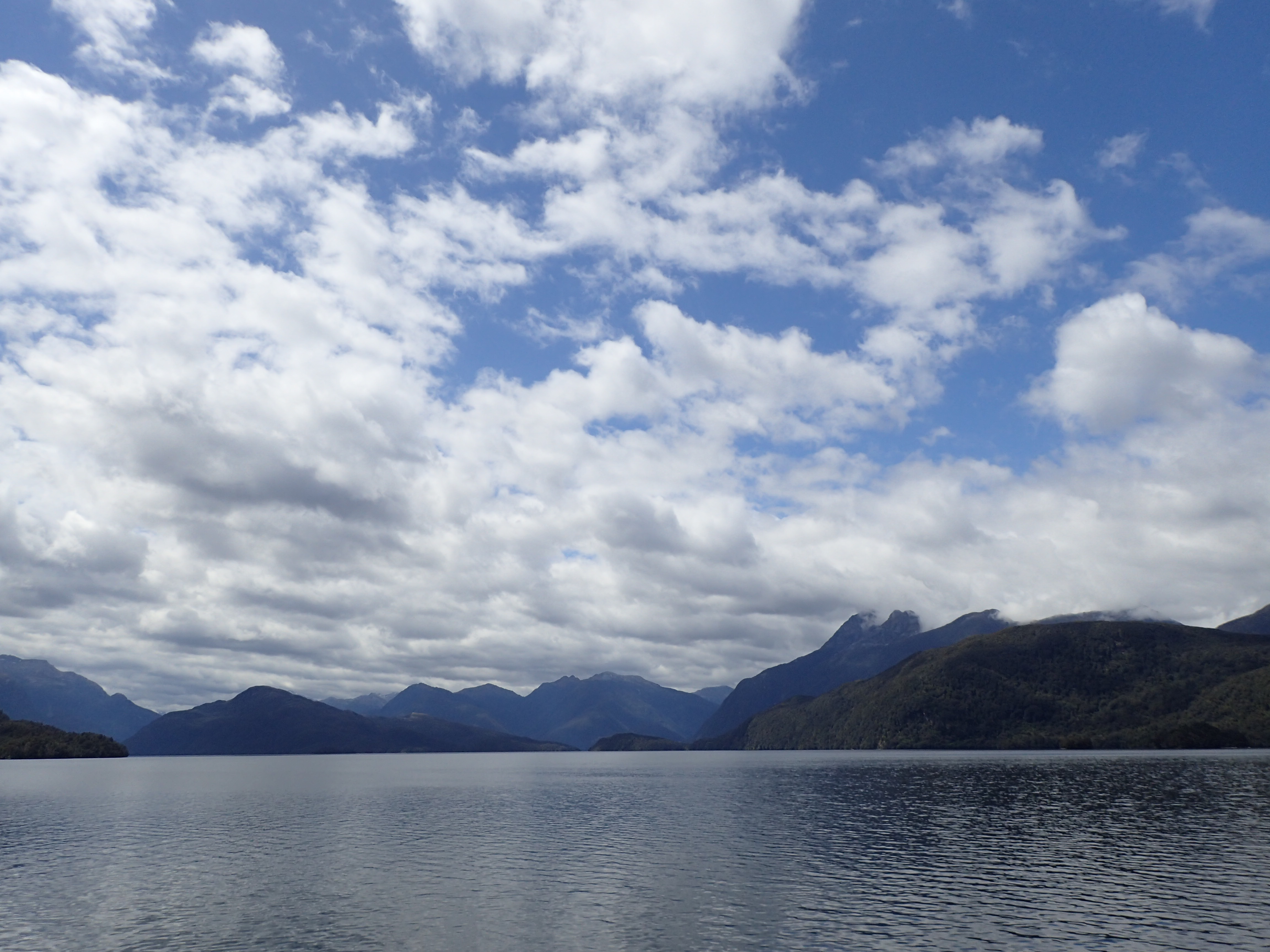
- Cooper Island (high and left of centre) and Long Island on the right

- Location within Fiordland Location within New Zealand

Geography
- Location: Fiordland
- Coordinates: 45°46′S 166°42′E
- Area: 18.99 km^{2} (7.33 sq mi)
- Length: 12 km (7.5 mi)
- Width: 2 km (1.2 mi)
- Highest elevation: 620 m (2030 ft)

Administration
- New Zealand

Demographics
- Population: 0

Long Island is an island in Fiordland, in the southwest of New Zealand's South Island. It lies within Tamatea / Dusky Sound, to the southeast of Resolution Island, and is separated from it and the South island mainland by Bowen Channel to the north, and from the South Island mainland by Cook Channel to the south.

Long Island is almost 19 square kilometres (7.3 sq mi) in size, but distinctively narrow at 12 kilometres (7.5 mi) in length and a maximum of 2 kilometres (1.2 mi) in width. The island is part of Fiordland National Park and is the fourth-largest island in the park with no possums present.

== See also ==
- Desert island
- List of islands
