= Mount Luxmore =

Mountain in Fiordland, New Zealand

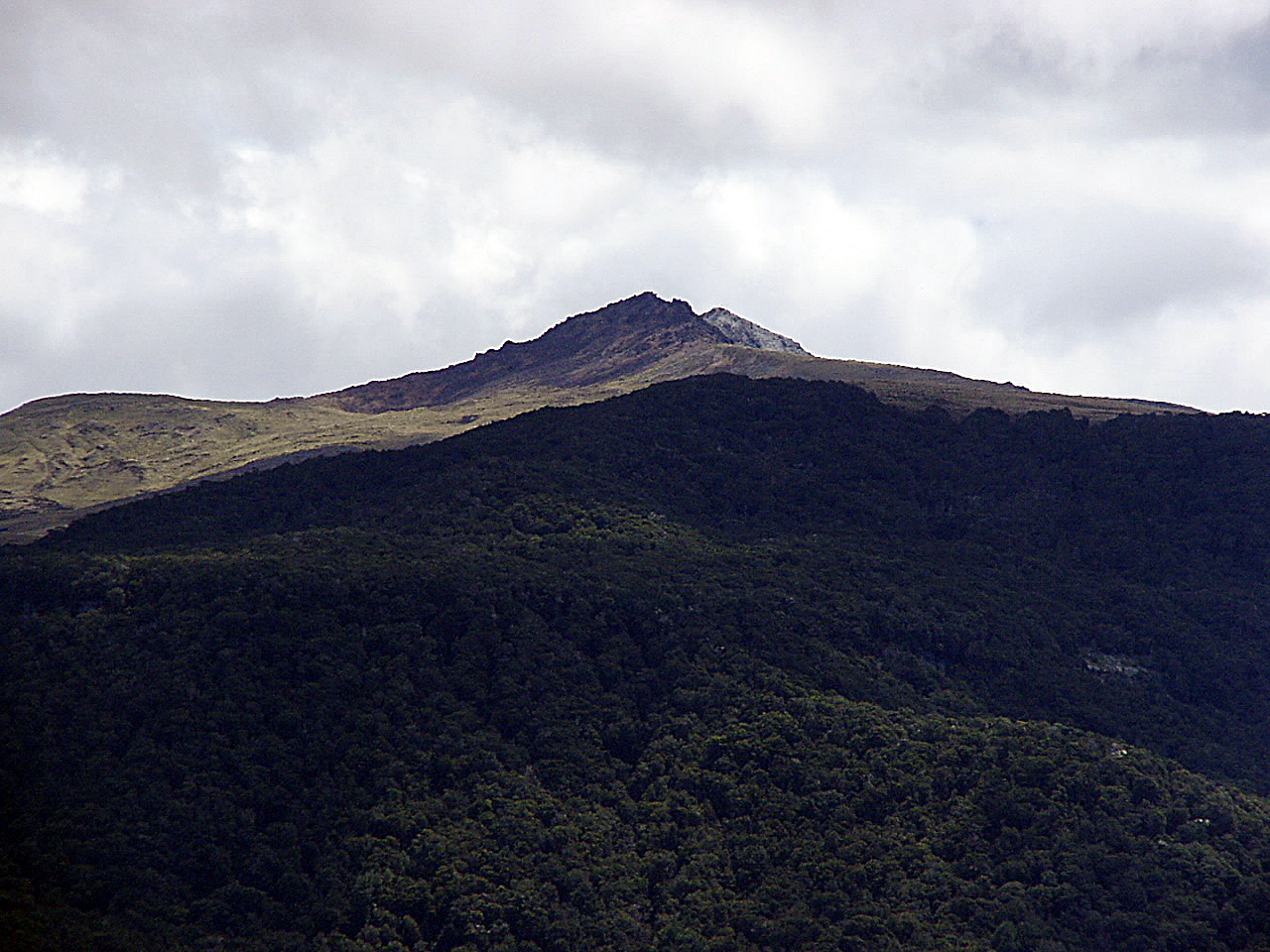
- Mount Luxmore showing a covering of beech forest

Highest point
- Elevation: 1,472 m (4,829 ft)
- Coordinates: 45°23′10″S 167°35′26″E

Geography
- Location within New Zealand
- Location: South Island, New Zealand

Mount Luxmore is a mountain in the South Island of New Zealand visible from the nearby town of Te Anau. The mountain is 1,472 metres (4,829 ft) high. It is part of the Kepler Track with the highest point on the track being the slightly lower Luxmore Saddle at a height of 1,400 metres (4,600 ft).

The mountain was named by James McKerrow after Philip Bouverie Luxmoore of Timaru.

== See also ==
- List of mountains of New Zealand by height
