= Resolution Island (New Zealand) =

Island in New Zealand's Fiordland region

Tau Moana (Māori)
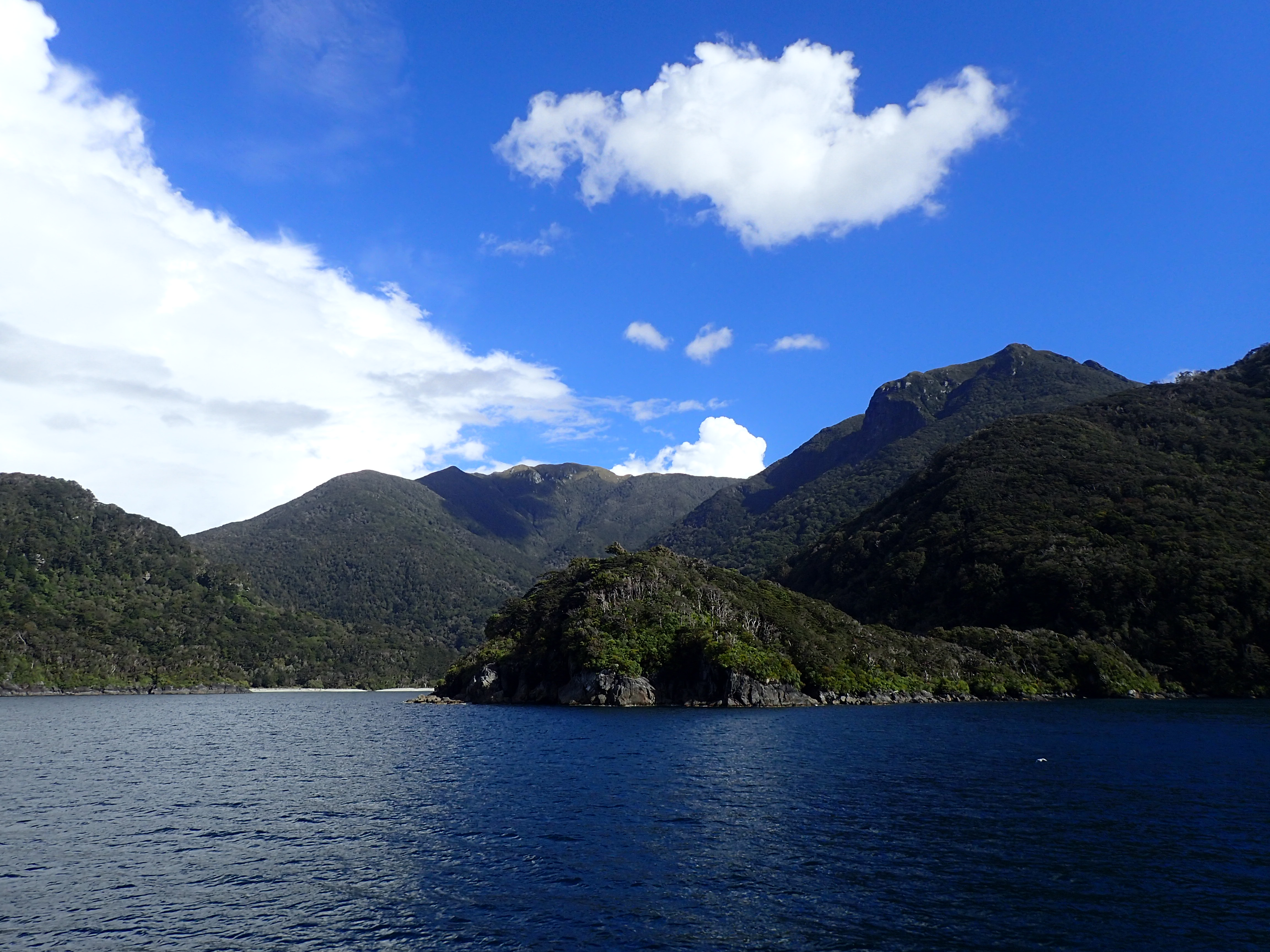
- Resolution from the North - Near the Gilbert Islands

- Location within Fiordland

Geography
- Coordinates: 45°40′S 166°40′E
- Archipelago: New Zealand
- Area: 208.87 km^{2} (80.65 sq mi)
- Highest elevation: 1,069 m (3507 ft)
- Highest point: Mount Clerke

Administration
- New Zealand

Demographics
- Population: 0

Resolution Island or Tau Moana (Māori) is the largest island in the Fiordland region of southwest New Zealand, covering a total of 208 km^{2} (80 sq mi). It is the country's seventh largest island, and the second largest uninhabited island. Resolution Island is separated from the mainland of the South Island by Tamatea / Dusky Sound, Te Puaitaha / Breaksea Sound, and Acheron Passage. The island is part of the Fiordland National Park.

The island is roughly rectangular, with the exception of a long narrow peninsula on the west coast known as Five Fingers Peninsula: an area protected by the Taumoana (Five Fingers Peninsula) Marine Reserve.

The island is named after Captain James Cook's ship Resolution which landed here on Dusky Sound during Cook's Second Voyage in March 1773.

The island was chosen in 2004 to be one of New Zealand's offshore reserves, which are cleared of introduced species to protect native species. This follows a much earlier episode, in 1894, when the Department of Lands and Survey appointed Richard Henry as curator of the island, which was stocked with species such as kākāpō and kiwi that were threatened by mustelids on the mainland. This early attempt at using the island for conservation management failed when stoats reached the island in 1900.

On 15 July 2009, Resolution island was at the epicentre of a magnitude 7.8 earthquake.

== Flora ==
The island is an important sanctuary, not only because it has never been colonised by possums, but also because it contains much ecological diversity in habitats ranging from wetlands to forests to alpine areas, with the highest mountains on the island reaching around 1,000 m. The most widespread forest type on the island is beech-broadleaved forest, while the alpine areas comprise mainly tussock, but also wetlands and tarns. Over 400 indigenous species have been recorded on the island, which is considerably more than on the surrounding mainland. Among the plants are six endangered species, such as several types of endemic mistletoe, and over a dozen nationally uncommon species. Many of these plants suffer elsewhere in Fiordland from browsing by possums.

== Fauna ==
The only introduced mammals on the island are stoats, red deer and mice. Ongoing stoat and rat control since 2008 allows the island to be used as a sanctuary. Pest trapping is being used on the island by laying trap networks including various DOC traps, and Goodnature A24 traps to aid in bringing the pest populations down to improve the environment for threatened bird species such as the mōhua (yellowhead) and tīeke (saddleback). Many other native bird species can be found on the island, including karearea (New Zealand falcon), kaka, kea, and kiwi.

== See also ==
- List of islands of New Zealand
- Lists of islands
- Desert island
