= Richard Henry (conservationist) =

Richard Treacy Henry (4 June 1845 – 13 November 1929) was a New Zealand conservationist and reserve manager who became an expert on the natural history of flightless birds in New Zealand, especially the kākāpō. Born in County Kildare, Ireland, his family migrated to Australia in 1851 where he grew up. He moved to New Zealand in the 1870s, settling in the south-west at Lake Te Anau in 1883 where he worked as a handyman, rabbiter, shepherd, taxidermist, boat-builder, explorer and guide, while studying the birdlife. He also began to write articles on natural history for the Otago Witness and other publications.

By 1891 public and governmental concern that introduced mustelids were having a devastating effect on New Zealand's birdlife led to the gazettal of Resolution Island in Fiordland as a reserve. In 1894 Henry was appointed curator and caretaker of Resolution Island, a position he held for the next 14 years. Over this period he transported numerous flightless birds, including kākāpō, weka and kiwi to Resolution Island, with the hope that they would be safe there. Unfortunately, the attempted translocation of kākāpō was in vain as stoats reached the island around 1900 and kākāpō did not survive there. During the Great War the New Zealand government came and took the iron off Henry's shed.

In 1908 increasing concern about Henry's welfare, due to his age and his isolated position on Resolution, led to his being offered the caretakership of Kapiti Island, a post which he accepted and occupied for the next three years, eventually retiring from government service in 1911. In 1912 he moved to Katikati in the Bay of Plenty where he lived until 1922 before moving for the last time to Helensville, north of Auckland. He died in 1929 of senile decay and heart failure. Only the local postmaster attended the funeral. He was buried at the Hillsborough Cemetery.

A male kākāpō, captured in Fiordland in 1975, and at that point the only remaining member of the species originating from the South Island, was named "Richard Henry" in his memory. This bird was found dead on 24 December 2010.

== Publications ==
Richard Henry wrote many short articles on natural history for newspapers such as the Otago Witness and the Kaipara and Waitemata Echo, and for scientific journals such as the Transactions of the New Zealand Institute, as well as letters and reports to his employers when working for the Department of Lands and Survey and the Department of Tourist and Health Resorts. He also published a book:

- Henry, R. (1903). The Habits of the Flightless Birds of New Zealand; With Notes on Other New Zealand Birds. Government Printer: Wellington.
