= Mount Balloon =

Mountain in New Zealand

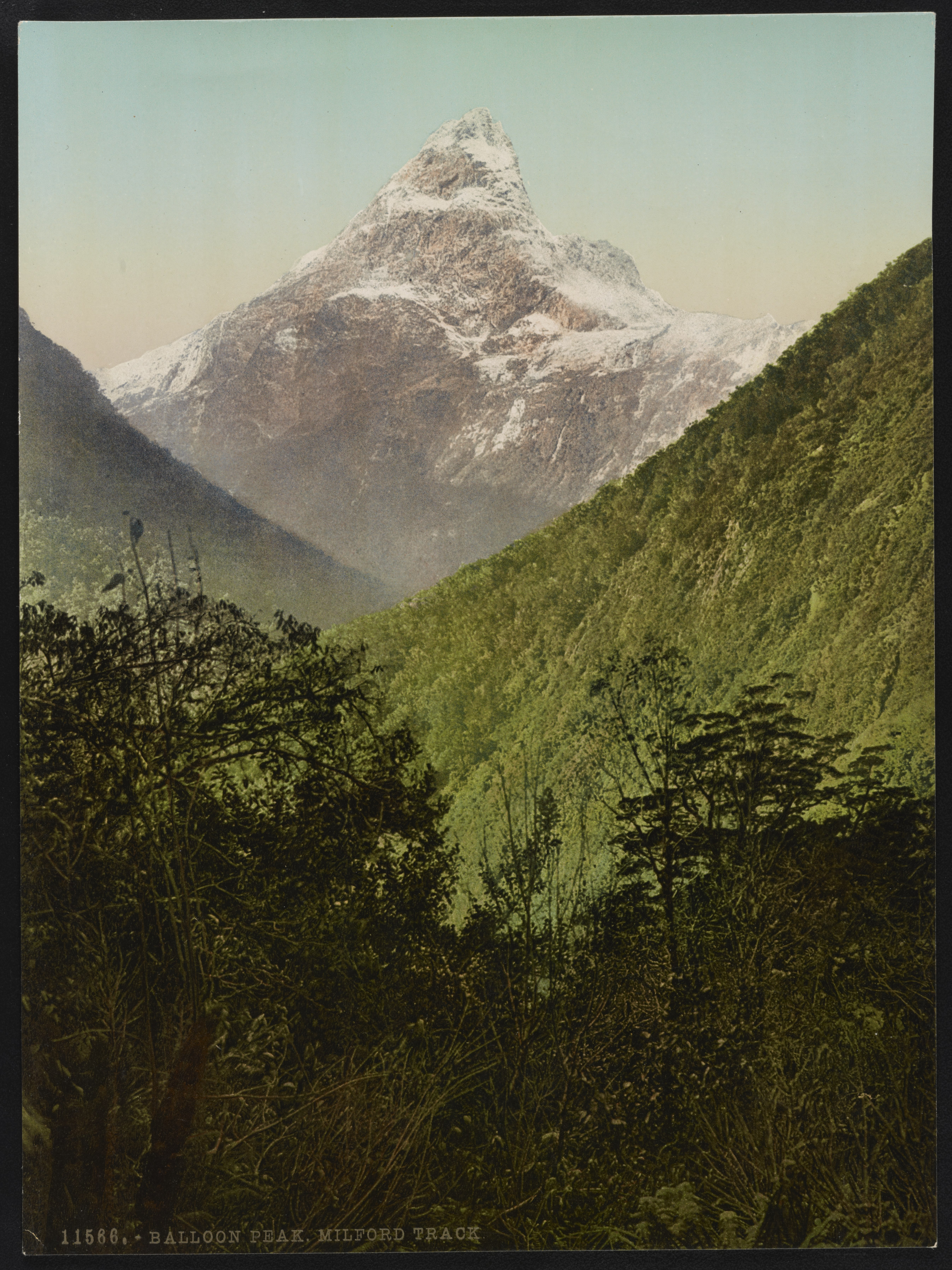
- West aspect

Highest point
- Elevation: 1,847 m (6,060 ft)
- Prominence: 260 m (853 ft)
- Isolation: 2.23 km (1.39 mi)
- Coordinates: 44.79976°S 167.78795°E

Geography
- Location within New Zealand
- Interactive map of Mount Balloon
- Location: South Island
- Country: New Zealand
- Region: Southland
- Protected area: Fiordland National Park
- Parent range: Wick Mountains
- Topo map(s): NZTopo50 CB08; NZMS260 D41

Geology
- Rock type: Metamorphic rock (Orthogneiss)

Climbing
- First ascent: 1911

Mount Balloon is an 1,847-metre-elevation (6,060-foot) mountain in Fiordland, New Zealand.

== Description ==
Mount Balloon is part of the Wick Mountains and is situated in the Southland Region of the South Island. It is set within Fiordland National Park which is part of the Te Wahipounamu UNESCO World Heritage Site. The peak is a prominent landmark along the Milford Track when crossing the McKinnon Pass, with the track traversing the lower west slope of the peak. Precipitation runoff from the mountain's west slope drains to the Arthur River, whereas the northeast slope drains into the North Branch Clinton River, and the south slope drains into the Clinton River's West Branch. Topographic relief is significant as the summit rises 1,250 metres (4,101 feet) above Clinton Canyon in one kilometre. The nearest higher neighbour is Mount Elliot, 2.23 kilometres to the north.

== Climbing ==
The first ascent of the summit was made in January 1911 by William Grave, Bert Lyttle, and Arthur Talbot via the North Ridge. There is also an established route on the Southeast Ridge which was first climbed in January 1953 by Barraclough, Black, and Conway.

== Etymology ==
This mountain's toponym was applied by Donald Sutherland who said the peak was sticking out of the mist like a balloon to the east of McKinnon Pass. William Grave, who made the first ascent, humorously wrote that "I have heard it said that the peak was so called because it was thought that no one would reach its summit except in a balloon."

== Climate ==
Based on the Köppen climate classification, Mount Balloon is located in a marine west coast climate zone. Prevailing westerly winds blow moist air from the Tasman Sea onto the mountains, where the air is forced upward by the mountains (orographic lift), causing moisture to drop in the form of rain or snow. The months of December through February offer the most favourable weather for viewing or climbing this peak.

== Gallery ==
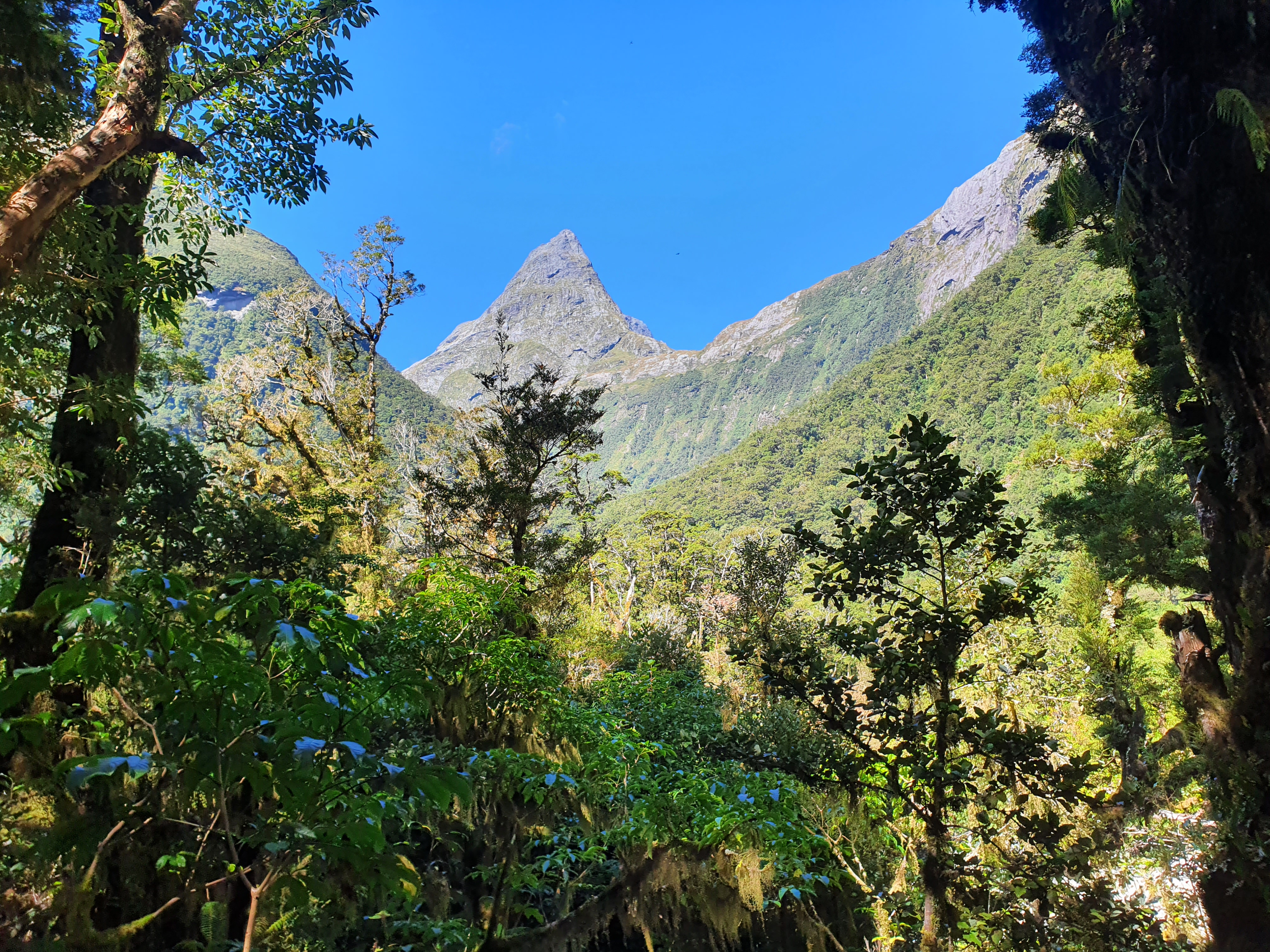
Looking up at Mount Balloon and McKinnon Pass from Milford Track near Quintin Lodge

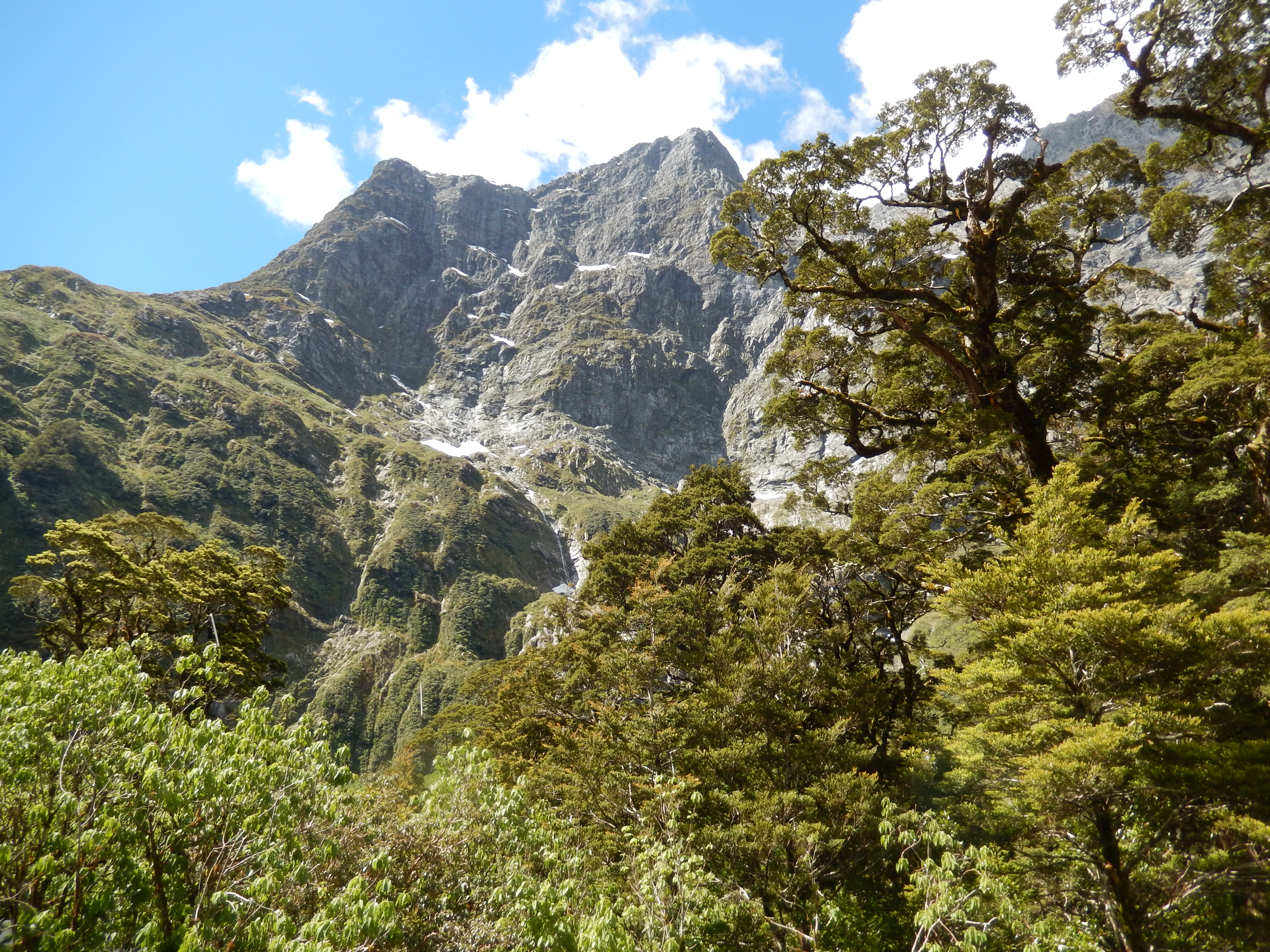
South aspect, from Mintaro Hut on the Milford Track

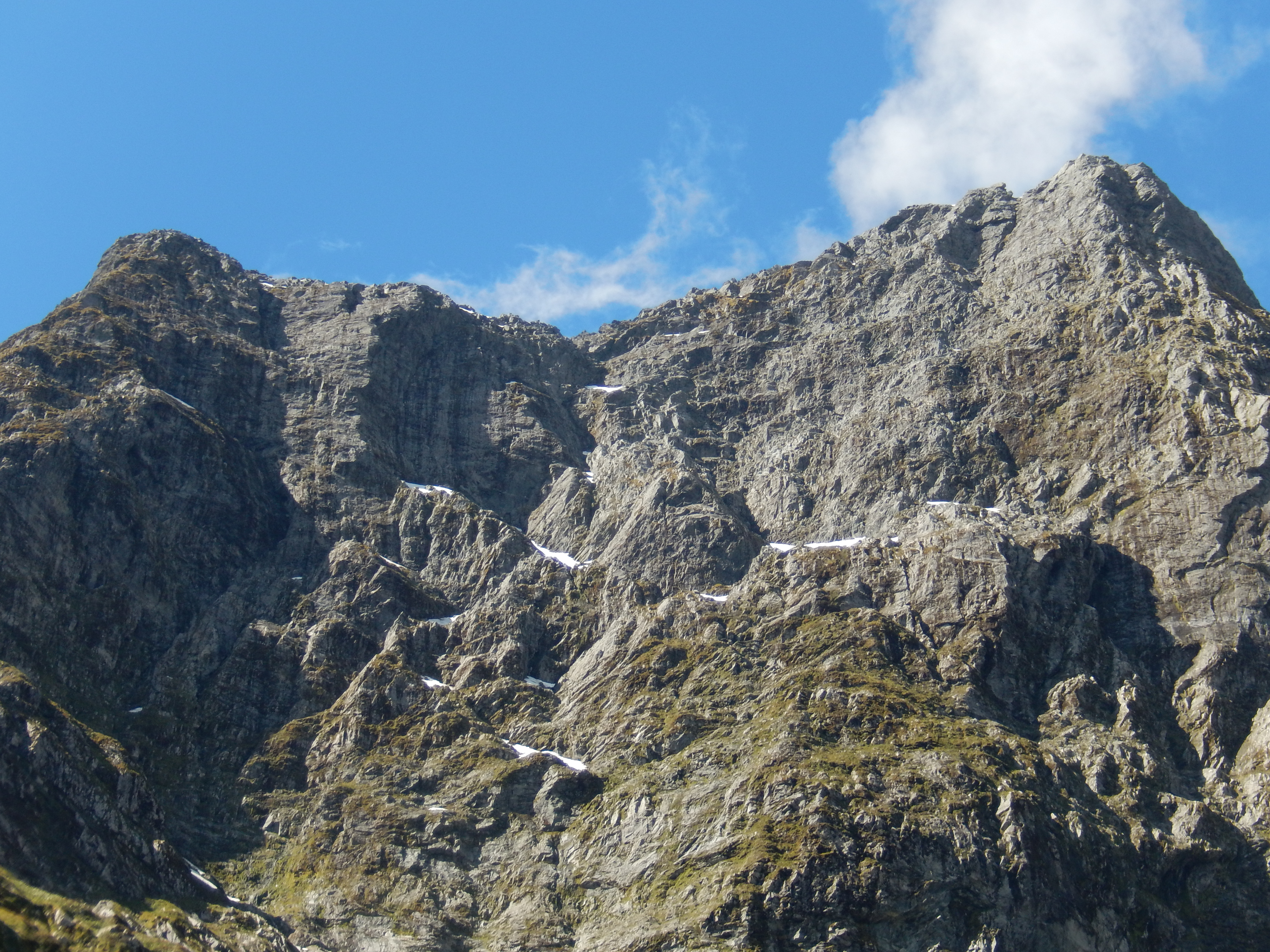
South aspect, from Lake Mintaro

== See also ==
- List of mountains of New Zealand by height
