= Wick Mountains =

Mountain range in New Zealand

- The Wick Mountains are shaded purple. This map also shows the approximate extent of the geological magma origin Darran Suite of gabbronorite and dioritic orthogneiss in red shading which composes most of the mountains.

Highest point
- Peak: Mount Elliot
- Elevation: 1,990 m (6,530 ft)
- Coordinates: 44.79431°S 167.89604°E

Geography
- Location: Fiordland, South Island, New Zealand

Climbing
- Normal route: Homer Tunnel
- Access: State Highway 94 (New Zealand)

The Wick Mountains are a range within New Zealand's Fiordland National Park, the country's biggest national park. Their highest peak is Mount Elliot 1,990 metres (6,530 ft), and this can be seen in fine weather from the Milford Track, a popular tourist walking track.

== Geography ==
The range is bounded by the Arthur River to the west, Milford Sound (Piopiotahi) and the valley of the Cleddau River to the west, the Homer Saddle, which separates them from the Darren Mountains to the north west and the valleys of the Neil Burn and Clinton River to the south. The Homer Tunnel lies under the north eastern extreme of the range.

Sheerdown Peak in the range is at the southern end of Milford Sound rising above the airport flat.

The mountains were named by Donald Sutherland after his birthplace in Caithness, Scotland.

Selected Peaks in Wick Mountains
Peak	Height	Coordinate	Picture
Mount Elliot	1,990 metres (6,530 ft)	44°46′47″S 167°47′06″E	Mount Elliot with Jervois Glacier in 2022.
Mount Belle	1,965 metres (6,447 ft)	44°46′28″S 167°59′06″E	Mount Belle
Mount Moir	1,965 metres (6,447 ft)	44°46′22″S 167°58′38″E	Mount Moir
Mount Anau	1,956 metres (6,417 ft)	44°51′57″S 167°55′18″E	
Mount Mitchelson	1,936 metres (6,352 ft)	44°48′04″S 167°53′27″E	
Mount Gendarme	1,931 metres (6,335 ft)	44°47′08″S 167°56′43″E	
Access Peak	1,865 metres (6,119 ft)	44°44′10″S 167°54′57″E	Access Peak
Mount Balloon	1,847 metres (6,060 ft)	44°47′59″S 167°47′17″E	
Mount Wilmur	1,710 metres (5,610 ft)	44°47′07″S 167°47′46″E	Mount Wilmer is to the right. This picture taken in high summer 2014 also shows to the left Mount Elliot with Jervois Glacier and can be compared to another picture on this page.

== Geology ==
The Wick Mountains are predominantly composed of a biotite from volcanic diorite dated just to their north to 138 ± 2.9 Ma and with younger intusion dykes of say quartz monzodiorite dated at 136 ± 1.9 Ma. These rocks are part of the Median Tectonic Zone that separates the Western and Eastern provinces of Zealandia rocks. They cover an area of about 740 km^{2} (290 sq mi). The mountains also have components to their southwest of orthogneiss.

== Climbing ==
Some of the mountains have known mountain climbing routes on what has been described as "amazing diorite".

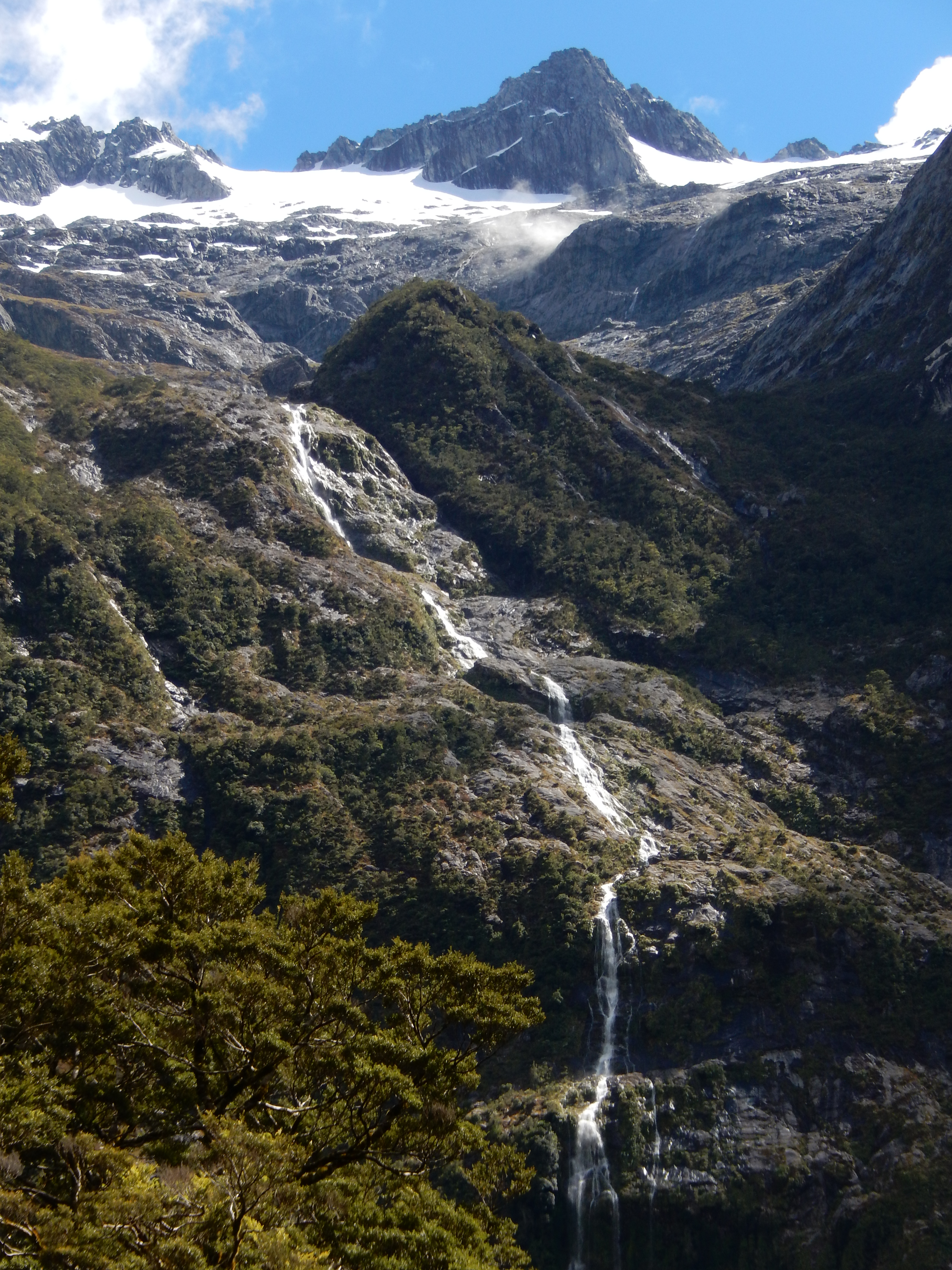
The Hirere Falls on the Milford Track are on the south western extreme of the Wick Mountains. The peaks behind at up to 1,920 metres (6,300 ft) do not have official names.

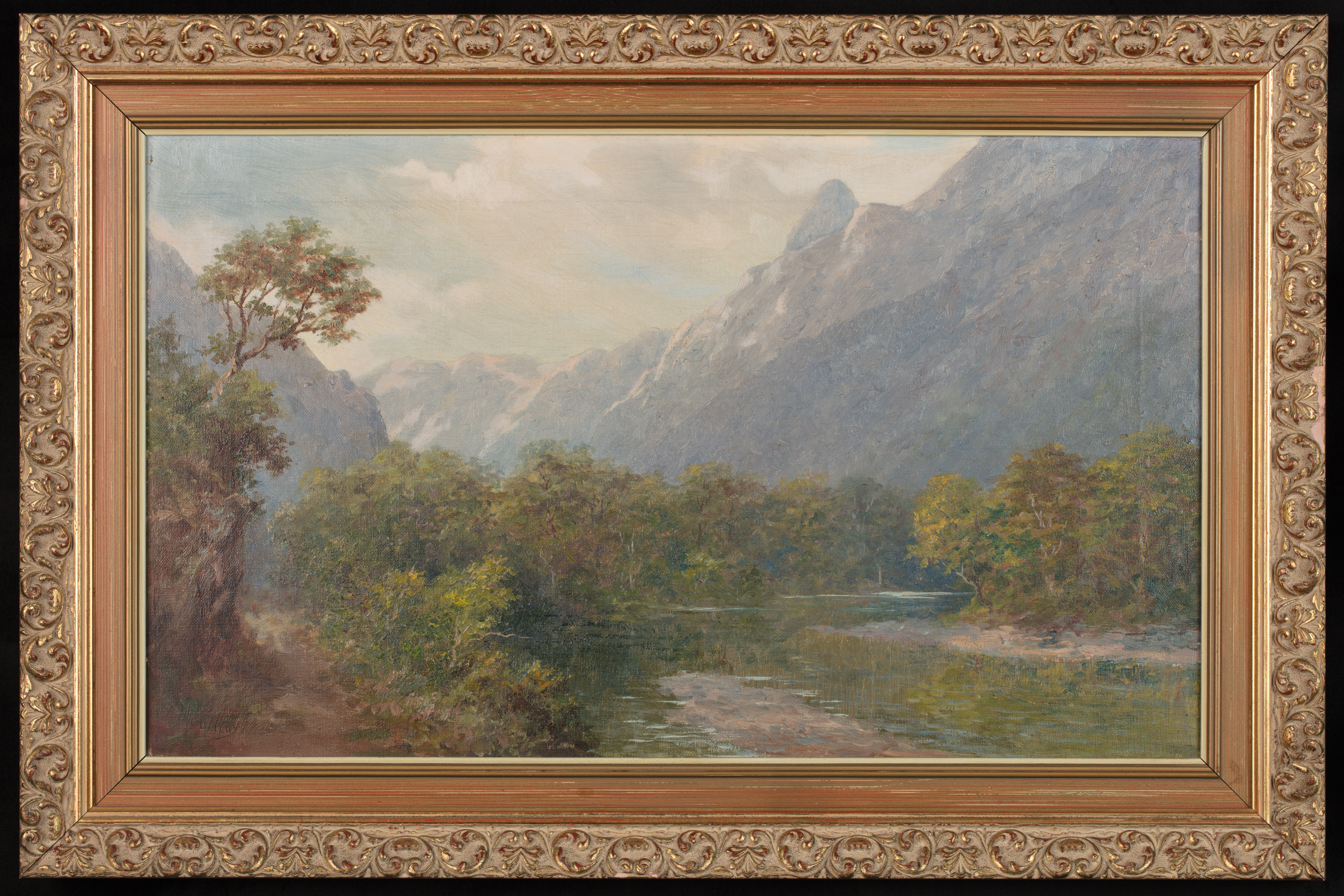
Clinton River Valley showing Wicks Mountains to right in view towards McKinnon Pass (Oil, John Elder Moultray about 1910, Auckland Museum).
