= Mount Moir =

Mountain in Fiordland, New Zealand

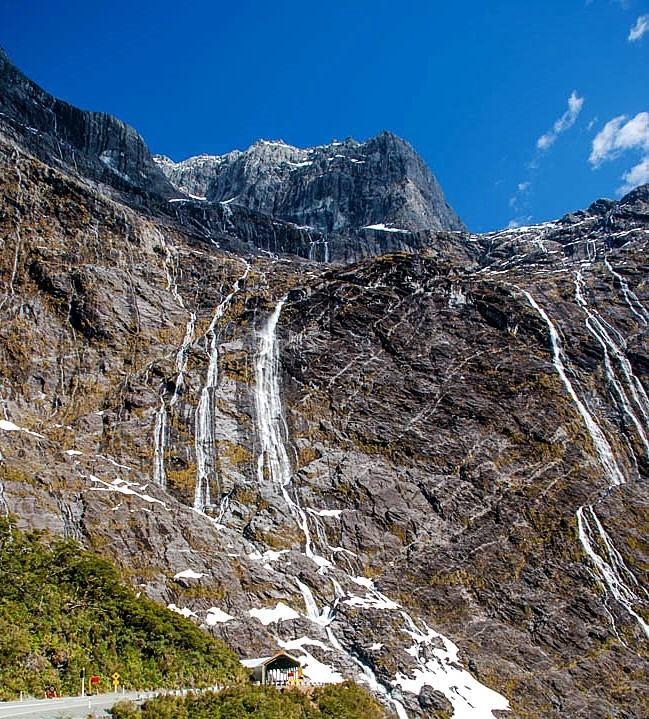
- Northwest aspect

Highest point
- Elevation: 1,965 m (6,447 ft)
- Prominence: 271 m (889 ft)
- Isolation: 2.91 km (1.81 mi)
- Coordinates: 44.77267°S 167.97718°E

Naming
- Etymology: George Morrison Moir

Geography
- Location within New Zealand
- Interactive map of Mount Moir
- Location: South Island
- Country: New Zealand
- Region: Southland
- Protected area: Fiordland National Park
- Parent range: Wick Mountains
- Topo map: Topo50 CB08

Geology
- Rock age: 136 ± 1.9 Ma
- Rock type(s): Gabbronorite, dioritic orthogneiss

Climbing
- First ascent: 1953

Mount Moir is a 1,965-metre-elevation (6,447-foot) mountain in Fiordland, New Zealand.

== Description ==
Mount Moir is part of the Wick Mountains and is situated above the west portal of Homer Tunnel in the Southland Region of the South Island. It is set within Fiordland National Park which is part of the Te Wahipounamu UNESCO World Heritage Site. Precipitation runoff from the mountain's northeast slope drains into the headwaters of the Hollyford River, whereas the northwest slope drains into the headwaters of the South Branch of the Cleddau River, and the south slope drains into Neale Burn which is a tributary of the Clinton River. Topographic relief is significant as the summit rises 1,165 metres (3,822 feet) above State Highway 94 in one kilometre. The nearest higher neighbour is Mount Talbot, 2.9 kilometres to the north-northeast.

== History ==
The first ascent of the summit was made in October 1953 by Bill Gordon, Lloyd Warburton, and Duncan Wilson. The mountain's toponym was applied in 1953 by Lloyd Warburton to honour George M. Moir (1897–1978), who explored much of this area, and led parties on the first ascents of nearby peaks such as Mount Talbot and Mount Christina. The toponym has been officially approved by the New Zealand Geographic Board.

== Climbing ==
Climbing routes with the first ascents:

- Original Route – Bill Gordon, Lloyd Warburton, Duncan Wilson – (1953)
- North Ridge – Bill Gordon, Ralph Miller – (1956)
- West Ridge – Godfrey Reider, Ron Webster, Dick Wood – (1959)
- South East Face – Ken Hyslop, Richard Price – (1975)
- South Ridge – Richard Price, Conway Powell – (1976)
- South Face – Don Bogie, Geoff Gabites – (1978)

== Climate ==
Based on the Köppen climate classification, Mount Moir is located in a marine west coast climate zone. Prevailing westerly winds blow moist air from the Tasman Sea onto the mountain, where the air is forced upward by the mountains (orographic lift), causing moisture to drop in the form of rain and snow. This climate supports a glacieret on the southwest slope. The months of December through February offer the most favourable weather for viewing or climbing this peak.

== See also ==
- List of mountains of New Zealand by height

== Gallery ==
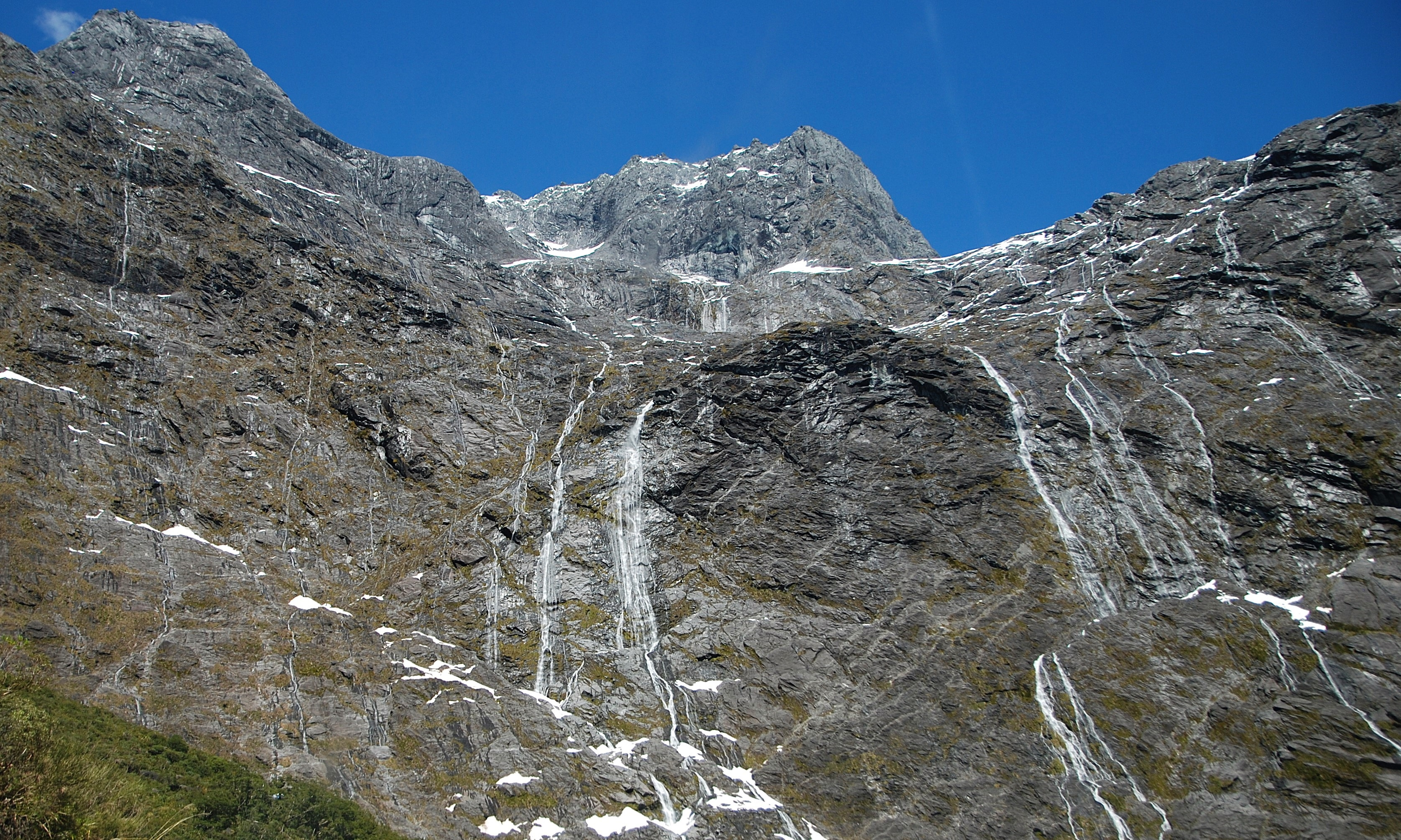

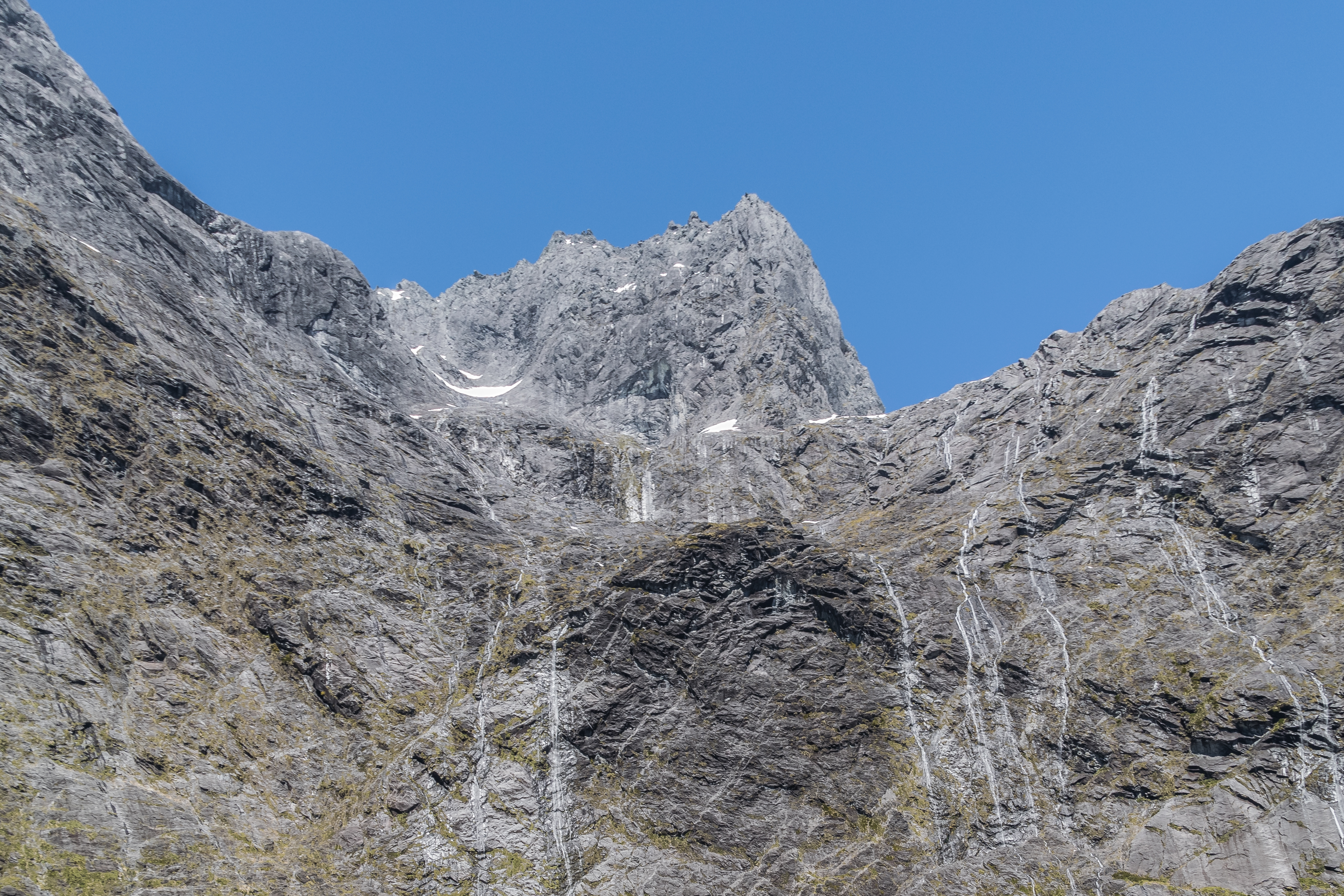

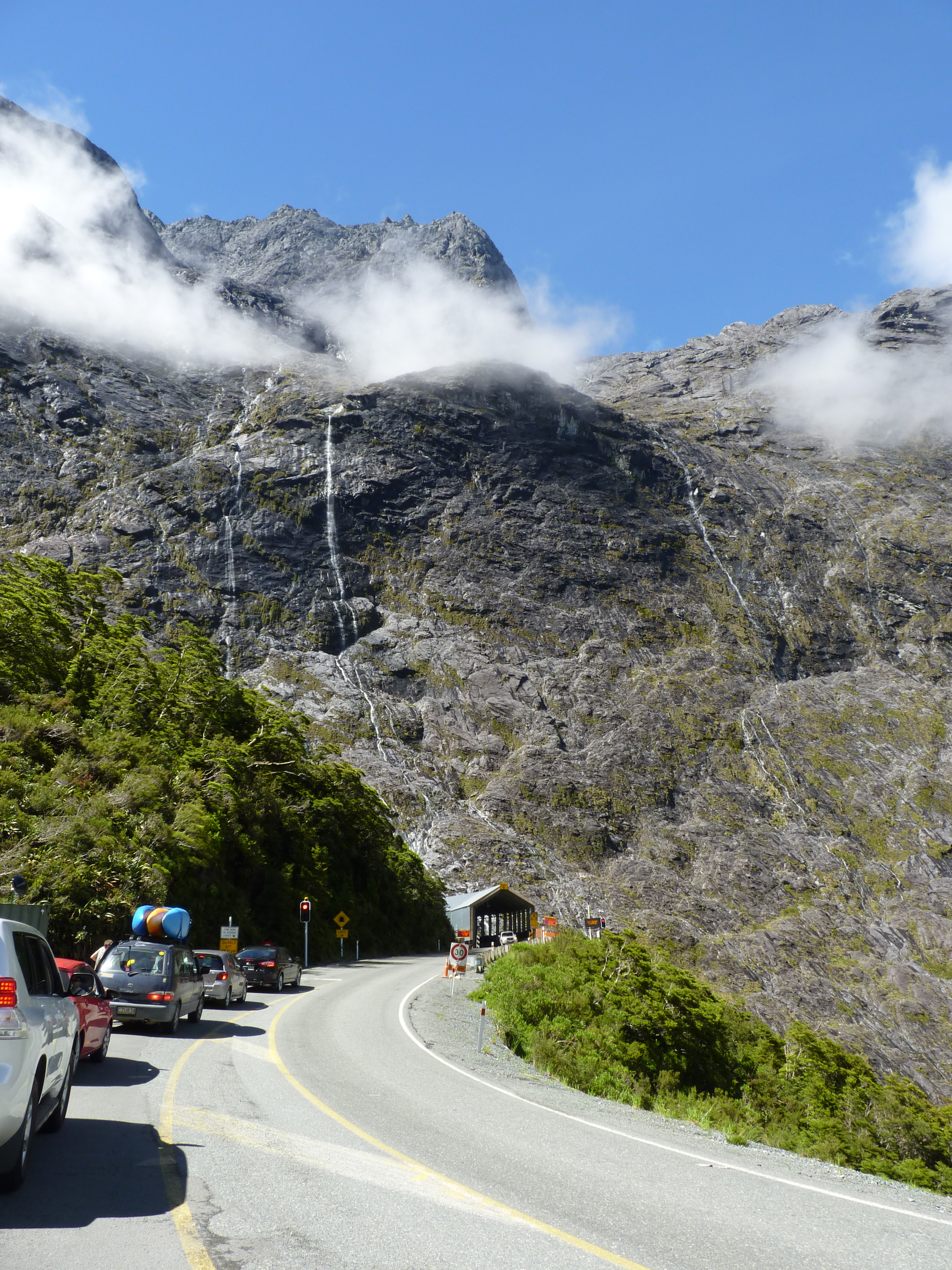
Mount Moir above cars waiting at Homer Tunnel

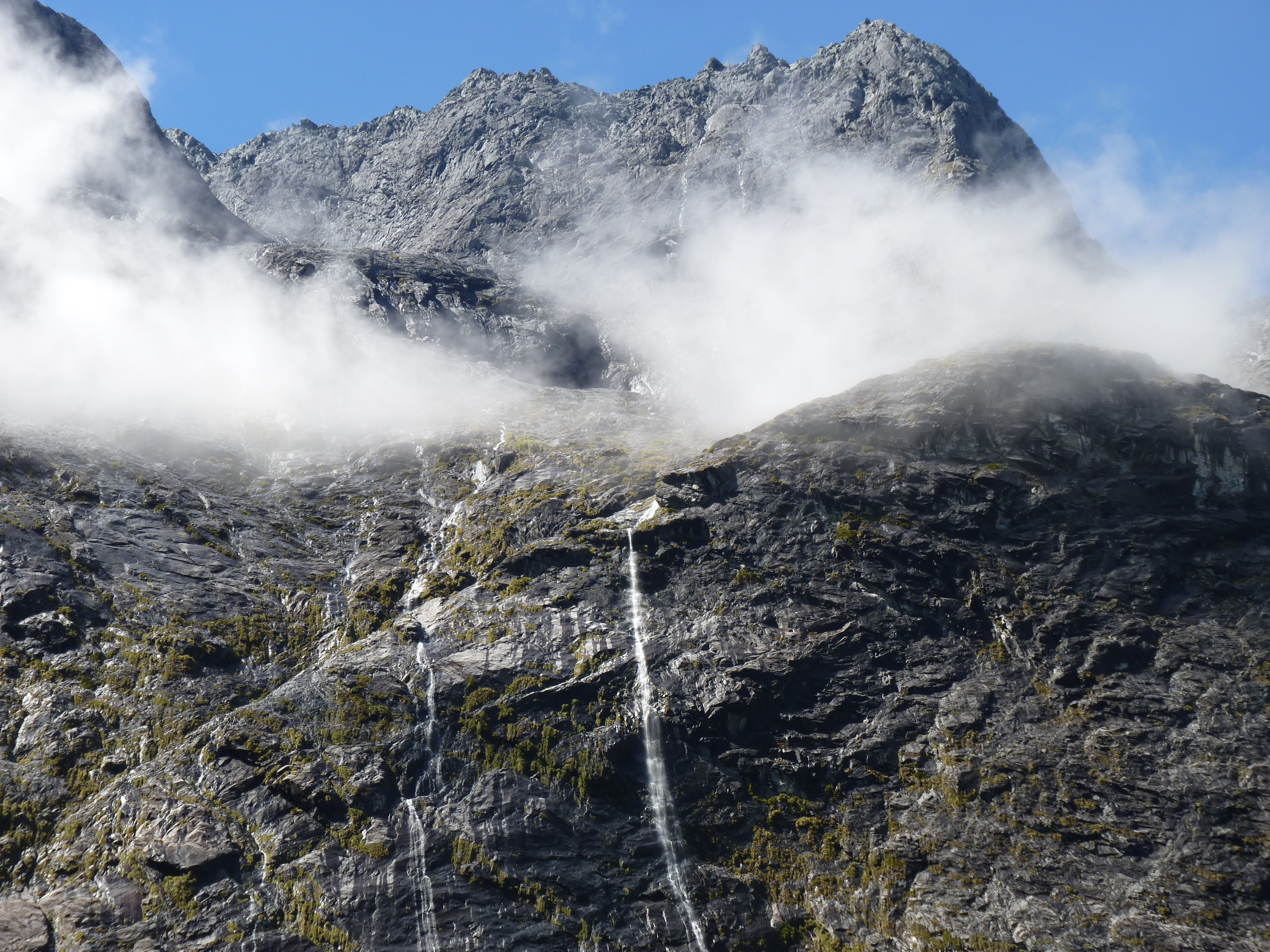

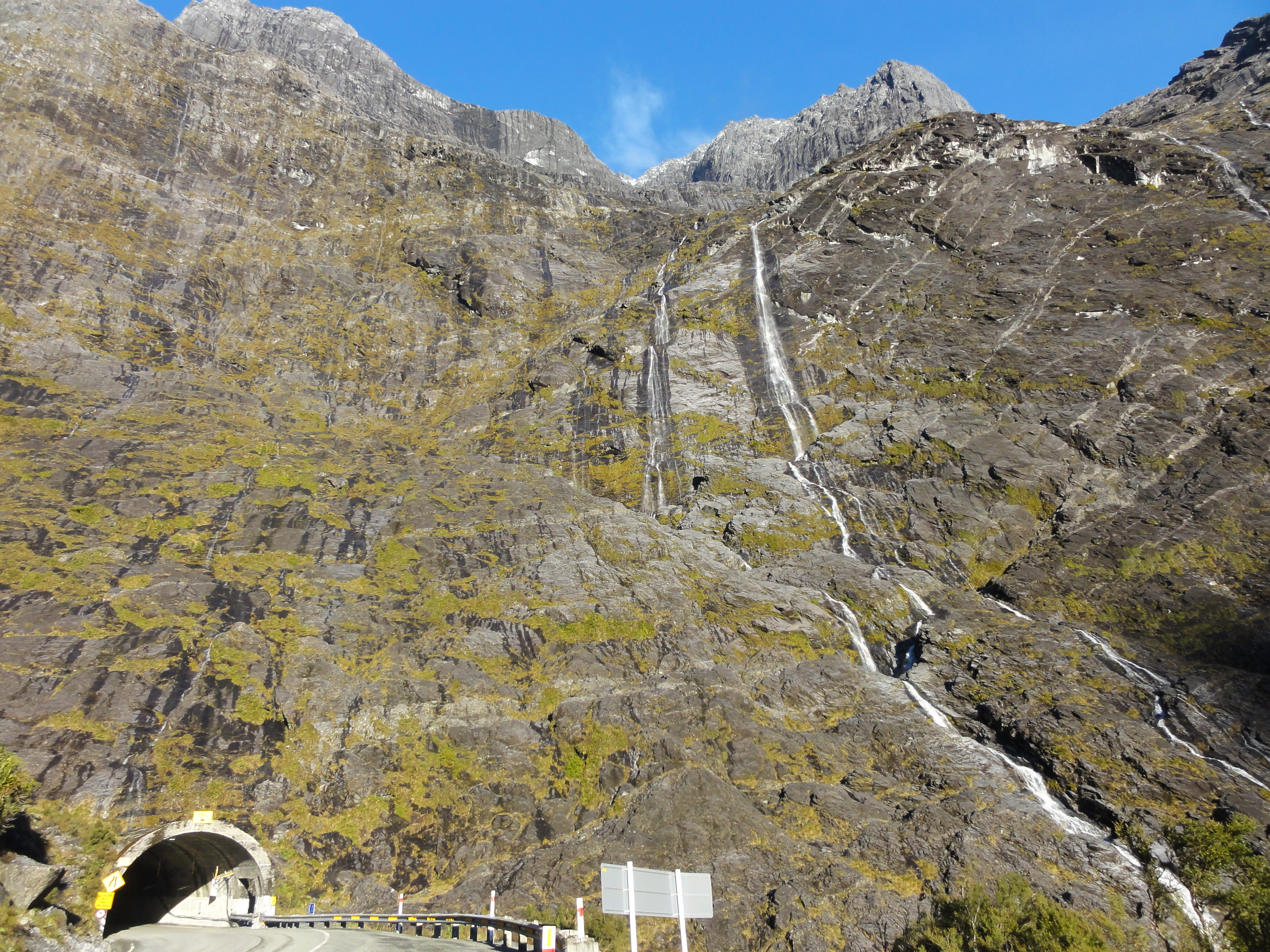
Mount Moir above west portal of Homer Tunnel

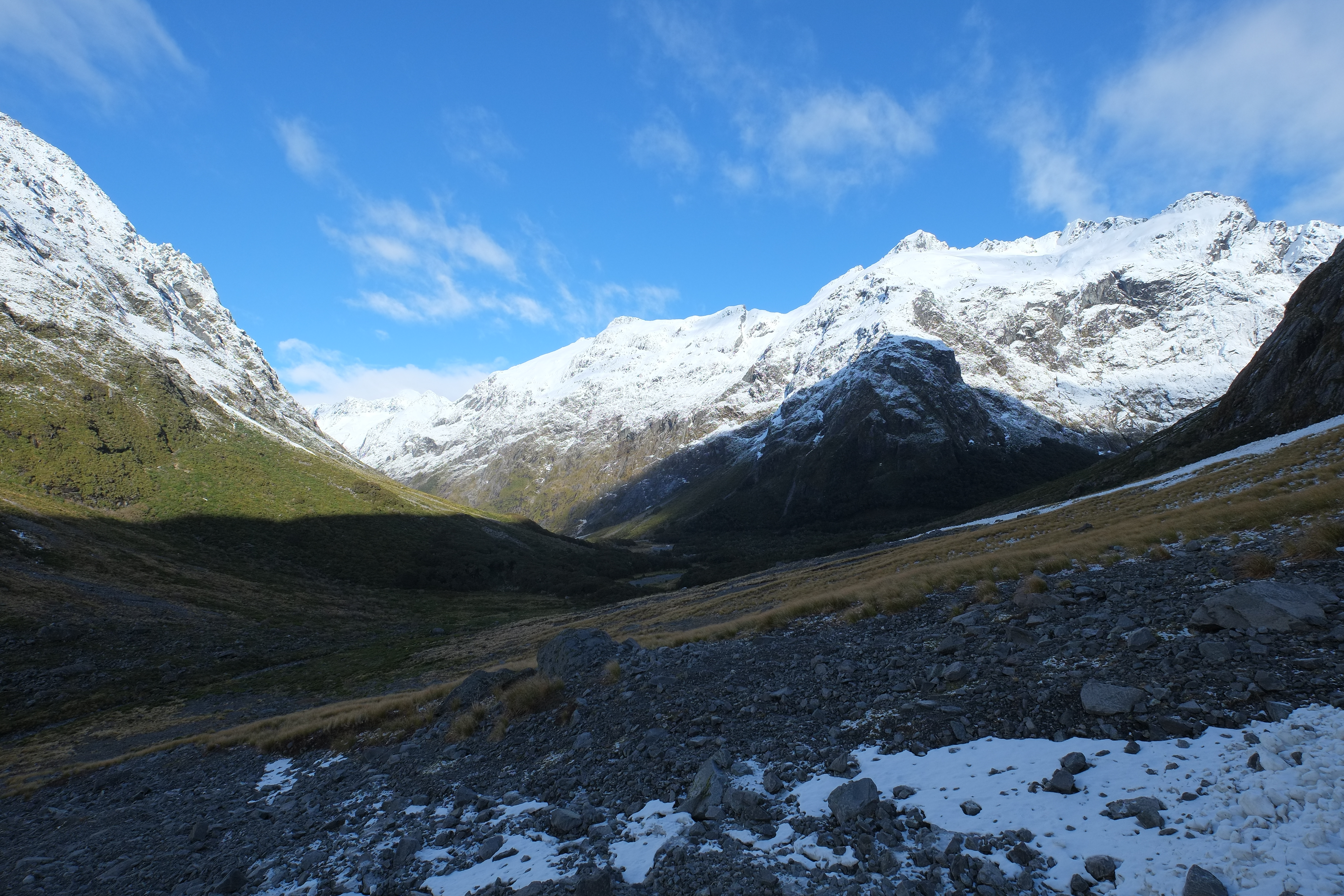
Northeast slope of Mount Moir in upper right corner

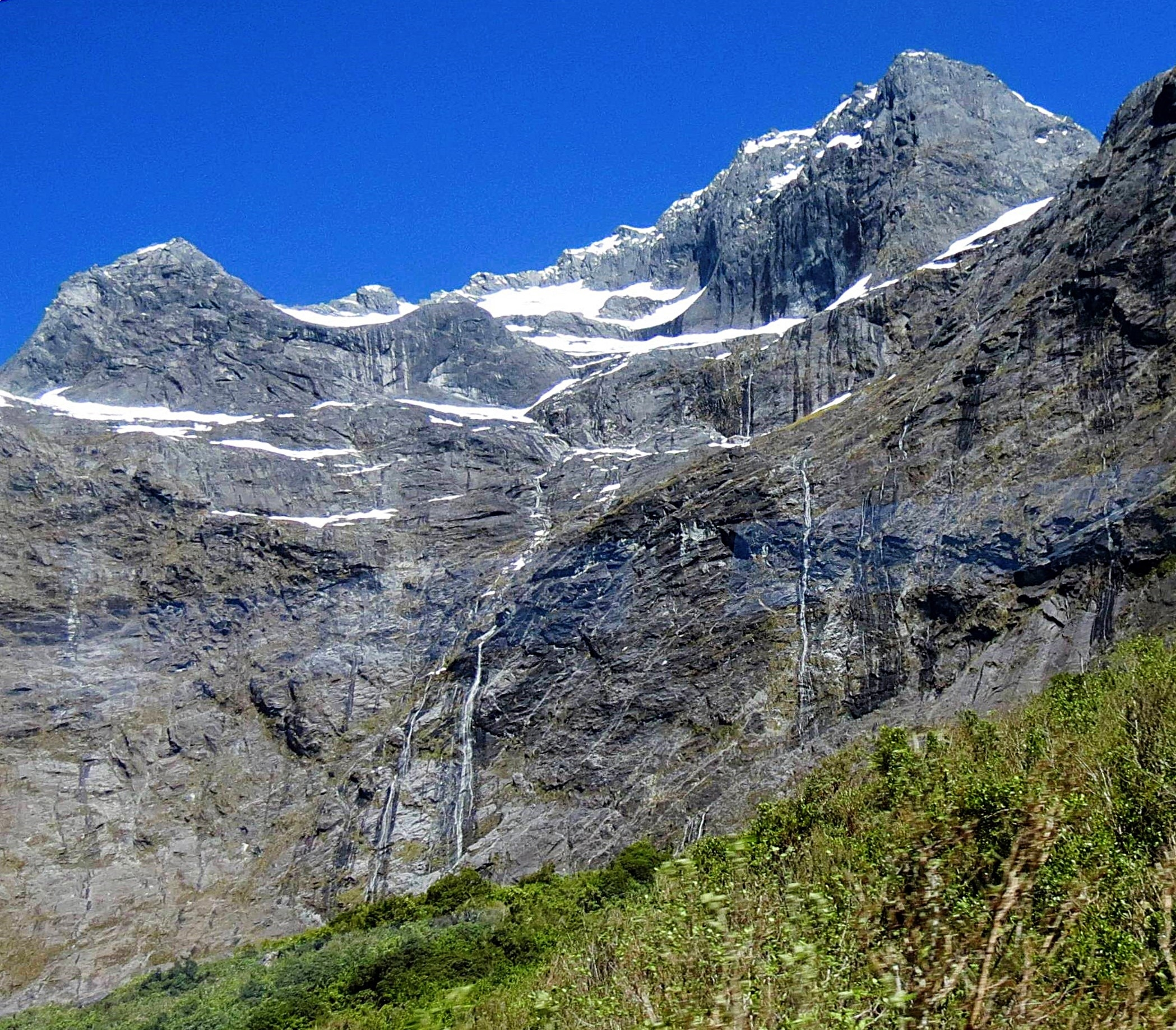

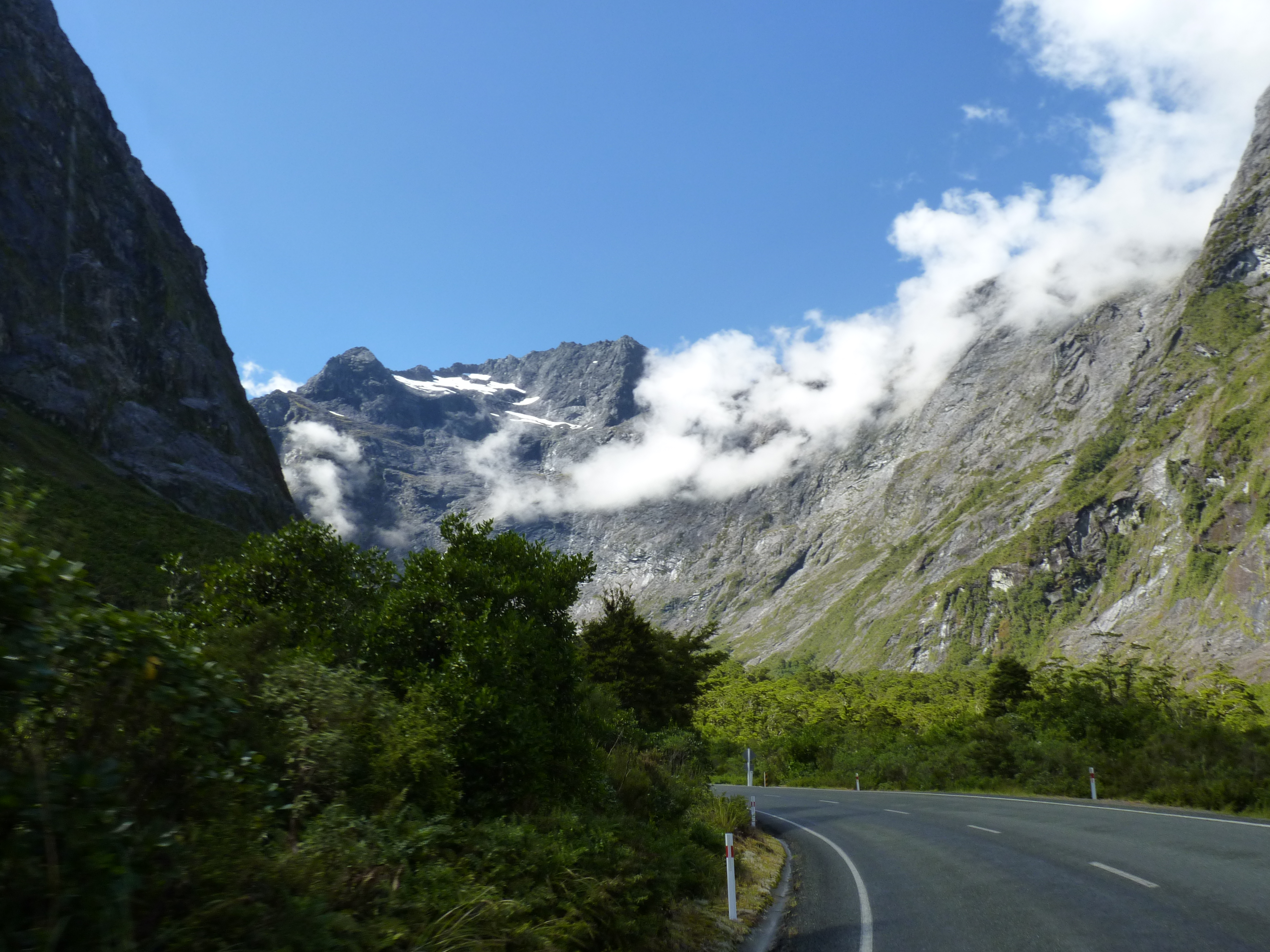
