= Mount Belle =

Mountain in Fiordland, New Zealand

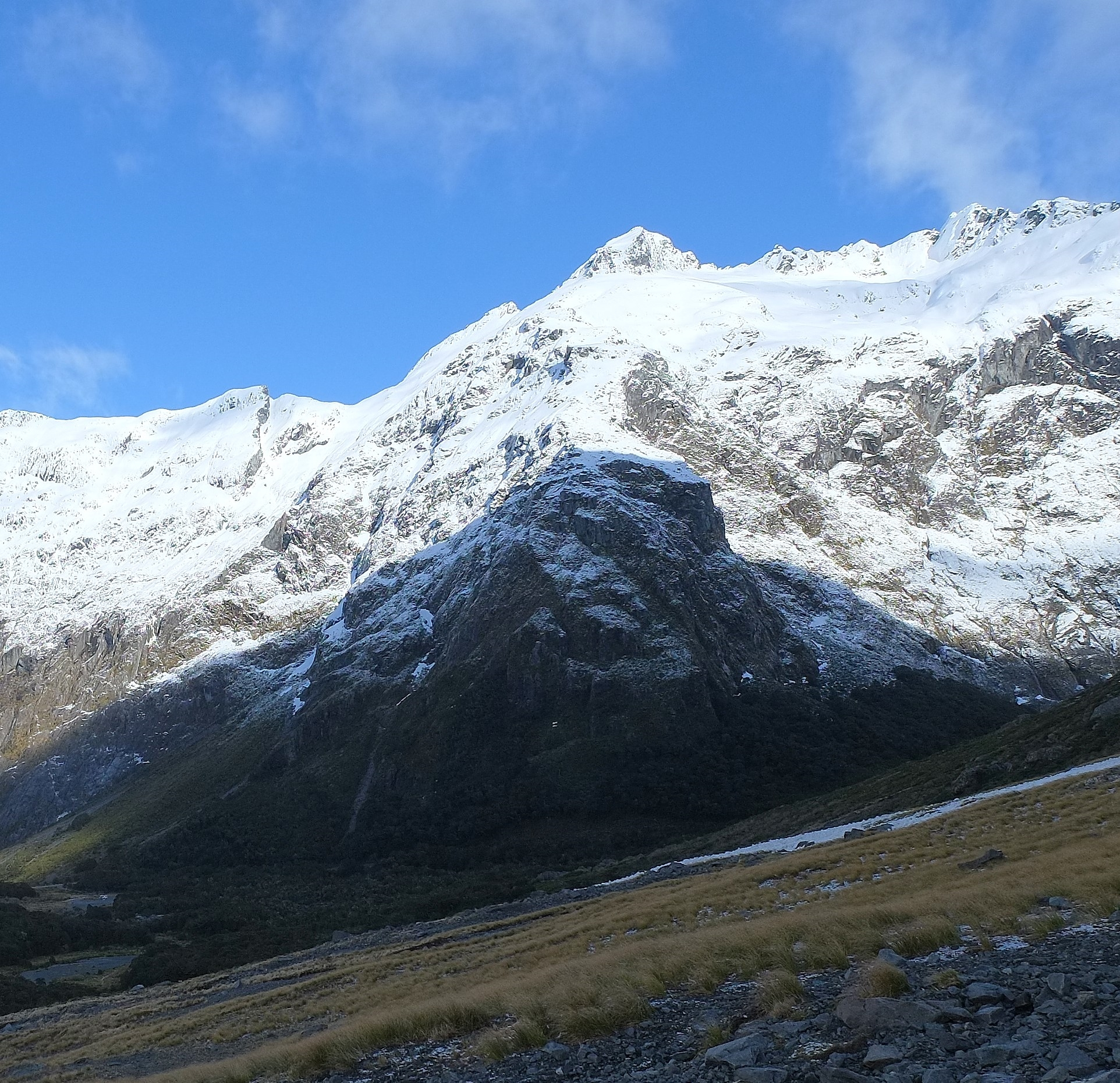
- Northeast aspect

Highest point
- Elevation: 1,965 m (6,447 ft)
- Prominence: 85 m (279 ft)
- Isolation: 2.81 km (1.75 mi)
- Coordinates: 44.77454°S 167.98501°E

Naming
- Etymology: Isabella (Gardner) Macpherson

Geography
- Location within New Zealand
- Interactive map of Mount Belle
- Location: South Island
- Country: New Zealand
- Region: Southland
- Protected area: Fiordland National Park
- Parent range: Wick Mountains
- Topo map(s): Topo50 CB08; NZMS260 D40

Geology
- Rock age: 136 ± 1.9 Ma
- Rock type(s): Gabbronorite, dioritic orthogneiss

Climbing
- First ascent: 1931

Mount Belle is a 1,965-metre-elevation (6,447-foot) mountain in Fiordland, New Zealand.

== Description ==
Mount Belle is part of the Wick Mountains and is situated above the east portal of Homer Tunnel in the Southland Region of the South Island. It is set within Fiordland National Park which is part of the Te Wahipounamu UNESCO World Heritage Site. Precipitation runoff from the mountain's north slope drains into the headwaters of the Hollyford River, whereas the south slope drains into Neale Burn which is a tributary of the Clinton River. Topographic relief is significant as the summit rises over 1,065 metres (3,494 feet) above State Highway 94 in one kilometre, and the south face rises 900 metres (2,953 feet) in one-half kilometre. The nearest higher neighbour is Mount Talbot, 2.8 kilometres to the north.

== History ==
The first ascent of the summit was made in 1931 by Scott Gilkison and Norman Davis. The mountain's toponym was applied in 1912 by surveyor Duncan Macpherson (1873–1954) to honour his wife, Isabella "Belle" Macpherson (1874–1941), who he married in 1896 and they had four children together. Duncan Macpherson was the son of John McPherson and Mount McPherson is situated three kilometres northwest on the opposite side of Homer Tunnel.

== Climbing ==
Climbing routes with the first ascents:

- Original Route from Milford Road – Scott Gilkison, Norman Davis – (1931)
- North Face – Bill Gordon, Ralph Miller, David Henderson – (1960)
- South Face via Biggs Hudson – Barry Biggs, Calum Hudson – (1974)
- South Face via Price Scott – Richard Price, Barry Scott – (1974)

== Climate ==
Based on the Köppen climate classification, Mount Belle is located in a marine west coast climate zone. Prevailing westerly winds blow moist air from the Tasman Sea onto the mountain, where the air is forced upward by the mountains (orographic lift), causing moisture to drop in the form of rain and snow. This climate supports a glacieret on the south slope. The months of December through February offer the most favourable weather for viewing or climbing this peak.

== See also ==
- List of mountains of New Zealand by height
