= Mount Elliot (New Zealand) =

Mountain in New Zealand

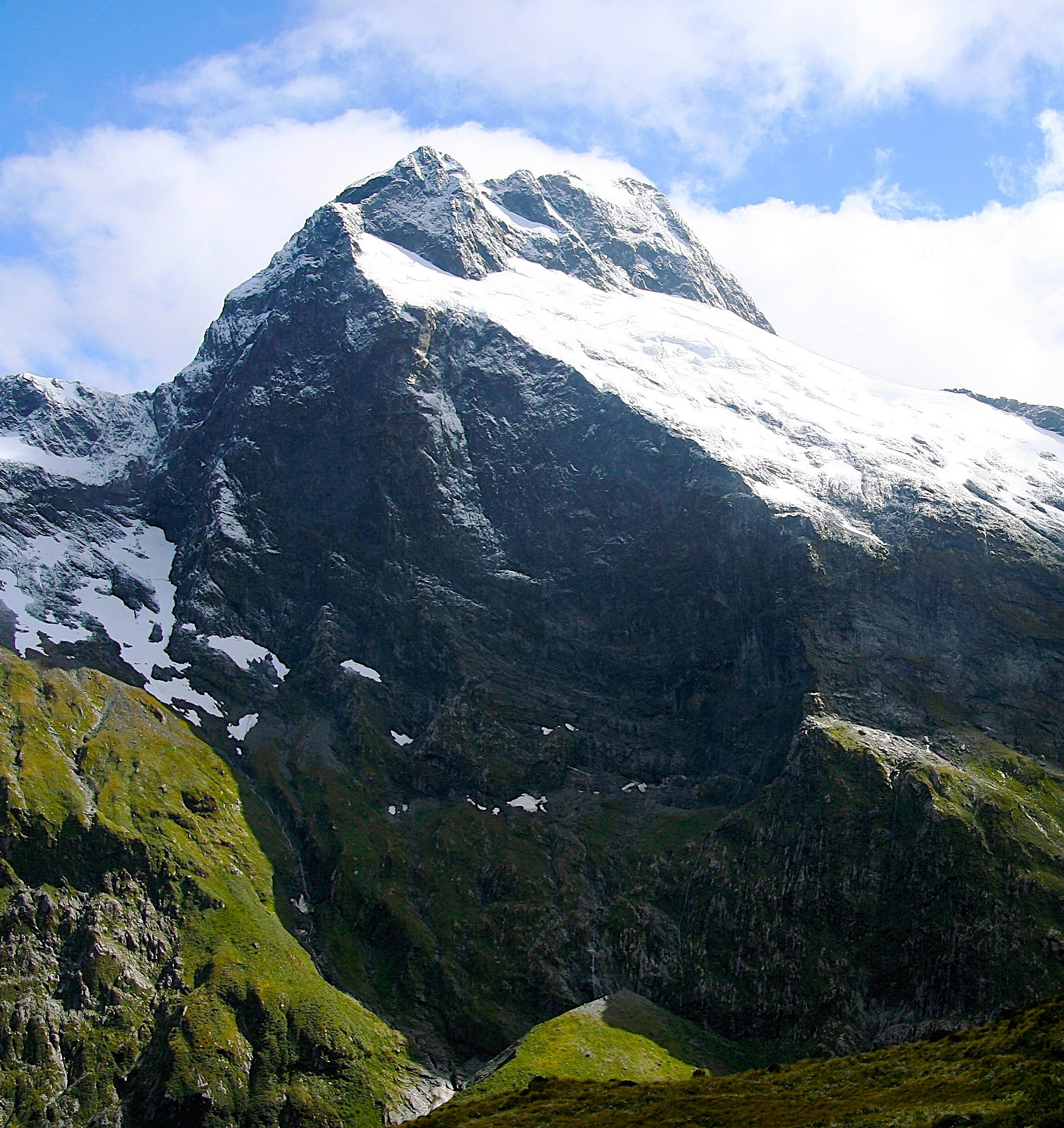
- South aspect

Highest point
- Elevation: 1,990 m (6,529 ft)
- Prominence: 766 m (2,513 ft)
- Isolation: 6.01 km (3.73 mi)
- Coordinates: 44°46′47″S 167°47′06″E

Naming
- Native name: Te Mauiuio-Ruru (Māori)

Geography
- Location within New Zealand
- Interactive map of Mount Elliot
- Location: South Island
- Country: New Zealand
- Region: Southland
- Protected area: Fiordland National Park
- Parent range: Wick Mountains
- Topo map: NZTopo50 CB08

Geology
- Rock type: Igneous rock (Diorite)

Climbing
- First ascent: 21 February 1917

Mount Elliot is a 1,990-metre-elevation (6,529-foot) mountain in Fiordland, New Zealand.

== Description ==
Mount Elliot is part of the Wick Mountains and is situated in the Southland Region of the South Island. It is set within Fiordland National Park which is part of the Te Wahipounamu UNESCO World Heritage Site. The peak is a prominent landmark along the Milford Track when crossing the McKinnon Pass on the way to Quintin Huts, with the track traversing the lower south slope of the peak. Precipitation runoff from the mountain's slopes drains west to the Arthur River, and east into the headwaters of the North Branch Clinton River. Topographic relief is significant as the summit rises 1,900 metres (6,234 feet) above the Arthur River Valley in two kilometres. The nearest higher peak is Pariroa / Castle Mount (2,122 metres), 7.5 kilometres to the south, and also the Wick Mountains' high point.

== Etymology ==
According to historian John Hall-Jones, this mountain was probably named after J. Elliot, chairman of the Lake County Council from 1890 through 1891. This mountain's toponym has been officially approved by the New Zealand Geographic Board. The mountain's Māori name is Te Mauiuio-Ruru which translates as "the weariness of Ruru," wherein Ruru was a lesser god who assisted Tuterangiwhanoa in the formation of the fiord landscape. After attacking McKinnon Pass, he sat down and rested on Mount Elliot, forming the depression that created the Jervois Glacier.

== Climate ==
Based on the Köppen climate classification, Mount Elliot is located in a marine west coast climate zone. Prevailing westerly winds blow moist air from the Tasman Sea onto the mountains, where the air is forced upward by the mountains (orographic lift), causing moisture to drop in the form of rain or snow. This climate supports the Jervois Glacier on the south slope. The months of December through February offer the most favourable weather for viewing or climbing this peak.

== Climbing ==
The first ascent of the summit was made on 21 February 1917 by Jack Murrell and Edgar Williams via the North Couloir. There is also an established route via the North Ridge.

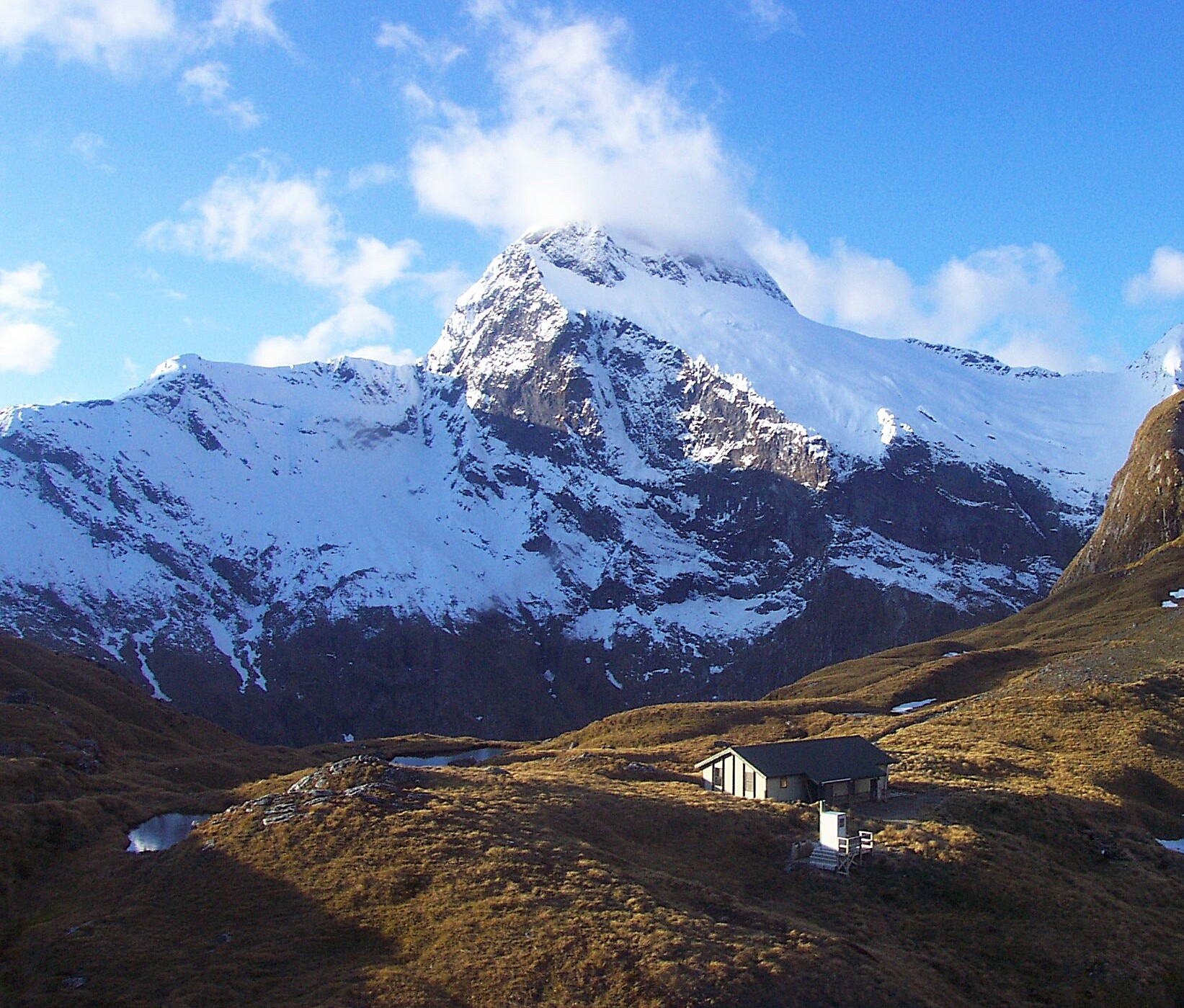
Mount Elliot with McKinnon Pass Shelter

== See also ==
- List of mountains of New Zealand by height
- Fiordland
