= Access Peak =

Mountain in Fiordland, New Zealand

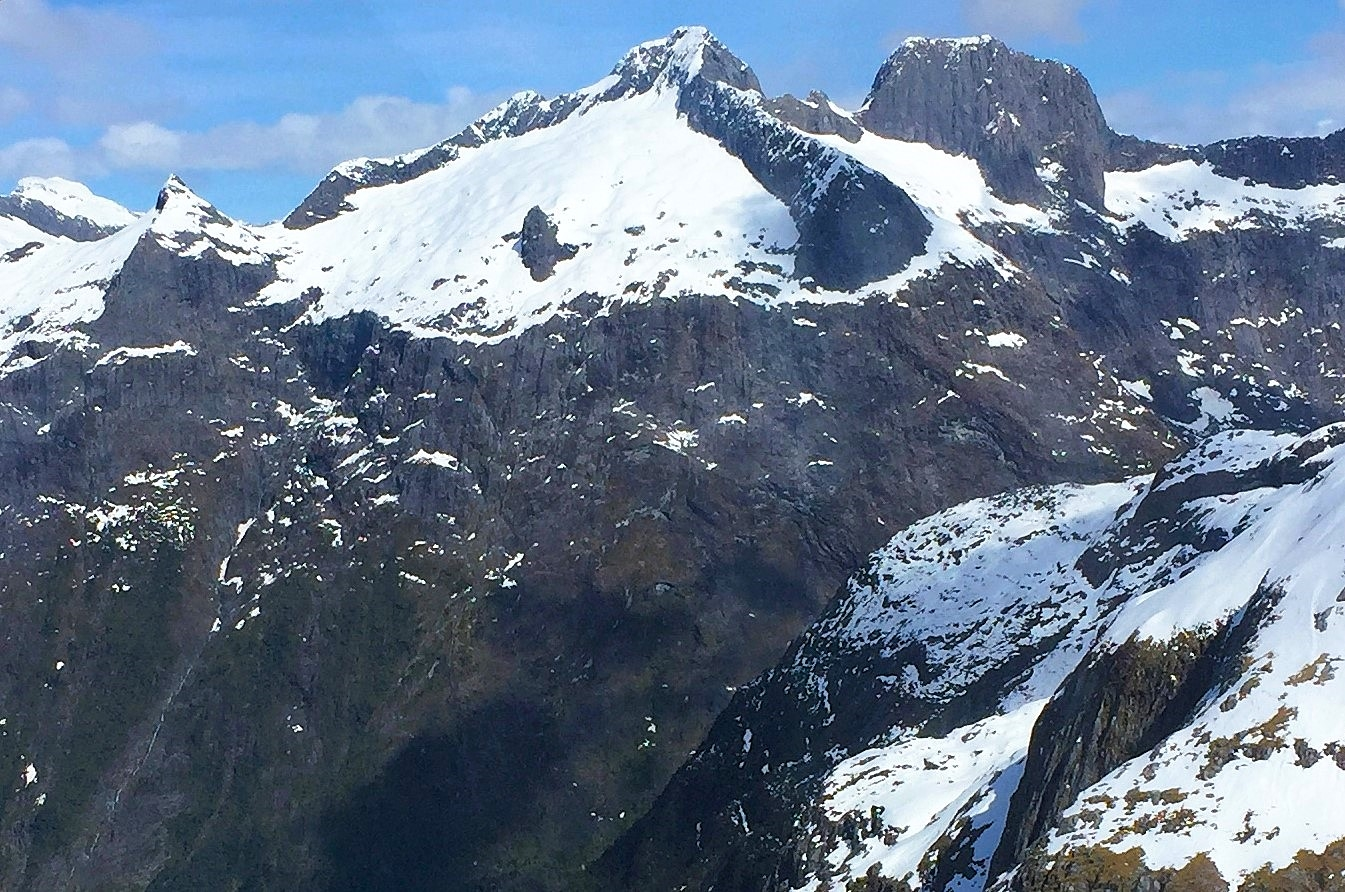
- Aerial view of northeast aspect

Highest point
- Elevation: 1,865 m (6,119 ft)
- Prominence: 292 m (958 ft)
- Isolation: 2.62 km (1.63 mi)
- Coordinates: 44.73623°S 167.91582°E

Geography
- Location within New Zealand
- Interactive map of Access Peak
- Location: South Island
- Country: New Zealand
- Region: Southland
- Protected area: Fiordland National Park
- Parent range: Wick Mountains; Sheerdown Hills
- Topo map: Topo50 CB08

Geology
- Rock age: 136 ± 1.9 Ma
- Rock type(s): Gabbronorite, dioritic orthogneiss

Climbing
- First ascent: 1955

Access Peak is an 1,865-metre-elevation (6,119-foot) mountain in Fiordland, New Zealand.

== Description ==
Access Peak is part of the Wick Mountains and is situated 4.8 km west of the Homer Tunnel in the Southland Region of the South Island. It is set within Fiordland National Park which is part of the Te Wahipounamu UNESCO World Heritage Site. Precipitation runoff from the mountain's north slope drains into the West Branch of the Cleddau River, whereas the south slope drains into the Talbot River, with all of it ultimately emptying into Milford Sound. Topographic relief is significant as the summit rises 1,565 metres (5,135 feet) above the West Branch Cleddau in a little more than one kilometre. The nearest higher neighbour is Mount Ada, 2.63 kilometres to the west-northwest.

== History ==
The first ascent of the summit was made on 26 February 1955 by Gerry Hall-Jones, Lloyd Warburton, Duncan B. Wilson, and Bill Gordon via the Southeast Ridge. The mountain's toponym was applied in 1955 by this first ascent party because a route over the summit of this peak seemed to provide a practical route to several difficult-to-access unclimbed peaks beyond it, hence this suggested the name "Access". The toponym has been officially approved by the New Zealand Geographic Board.

== Climbing ==
Climbing routes with the first ascents:

- Original Route – Gerry Hall-Jones, Bill Gordon, Lloyd Warburton, Duncan Wilson – (1955)
- West Ridge – Hugh van Noorden – (1985)

== Climate ==
Based on the Köppen climate classification, Access Peak is located in a marine west coast climate zone. Prevailing westerly winds blow moist air from the Tasman Sea onto the mountain, where the air is forced upward by the mountains (orographic lift), causing moisture to drop in the form of rain and snow. The months of December through February offer the most favourable weather for viewing or climbing this peak.

== See also ==
- List of mountains of New Zealand by height
