= Talbot River (New Zealand) =

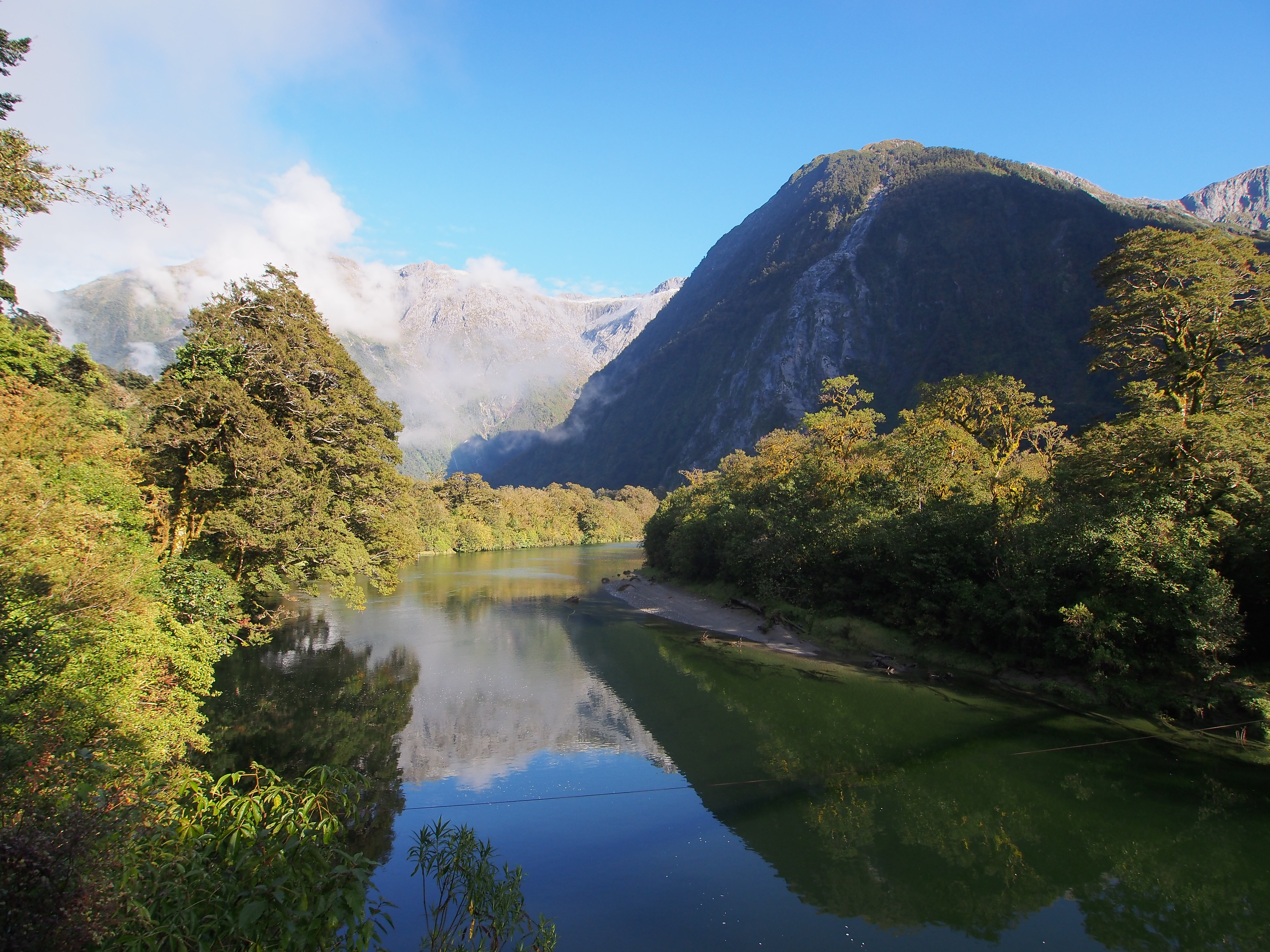
- Arthur River in 2013
- Route of the Arthur River
- Mouth of the Arthur River Talbot River (New Zealand) (South Island) Talbot River (New Zealand) (New Zealand)
- Native name: Te Awa-o-Hine

Location
- Country: New Zealand
- Region: Southland
- District: Southland

Physical characteristics
- Source
  - location: Buttercup Lake
  - coordinates: 44°46′53″S 167°56′06″E
- Mouth
  - location: Joes River
  - coordinates: 44°45′46″S 167°53′21″E

Basin features
- Progression: Talbot River → Joes River → Lake Ada → Arthur River → Milford Sound → Tasman Sea
- Tributaries
  - left: Diamond Creek, Mackay Creek, Poseidon Creek, Camp Oven Creek

The Talbot River is a river in northern Fiordland, New Zealand. A tributary of Joes River, it rises west of Gulliver Peak.

== See also ==
- List of rivers of New Zealand
