= Mount Talbot (New Zealand) =

Mountain in Fiordland, New Zealand

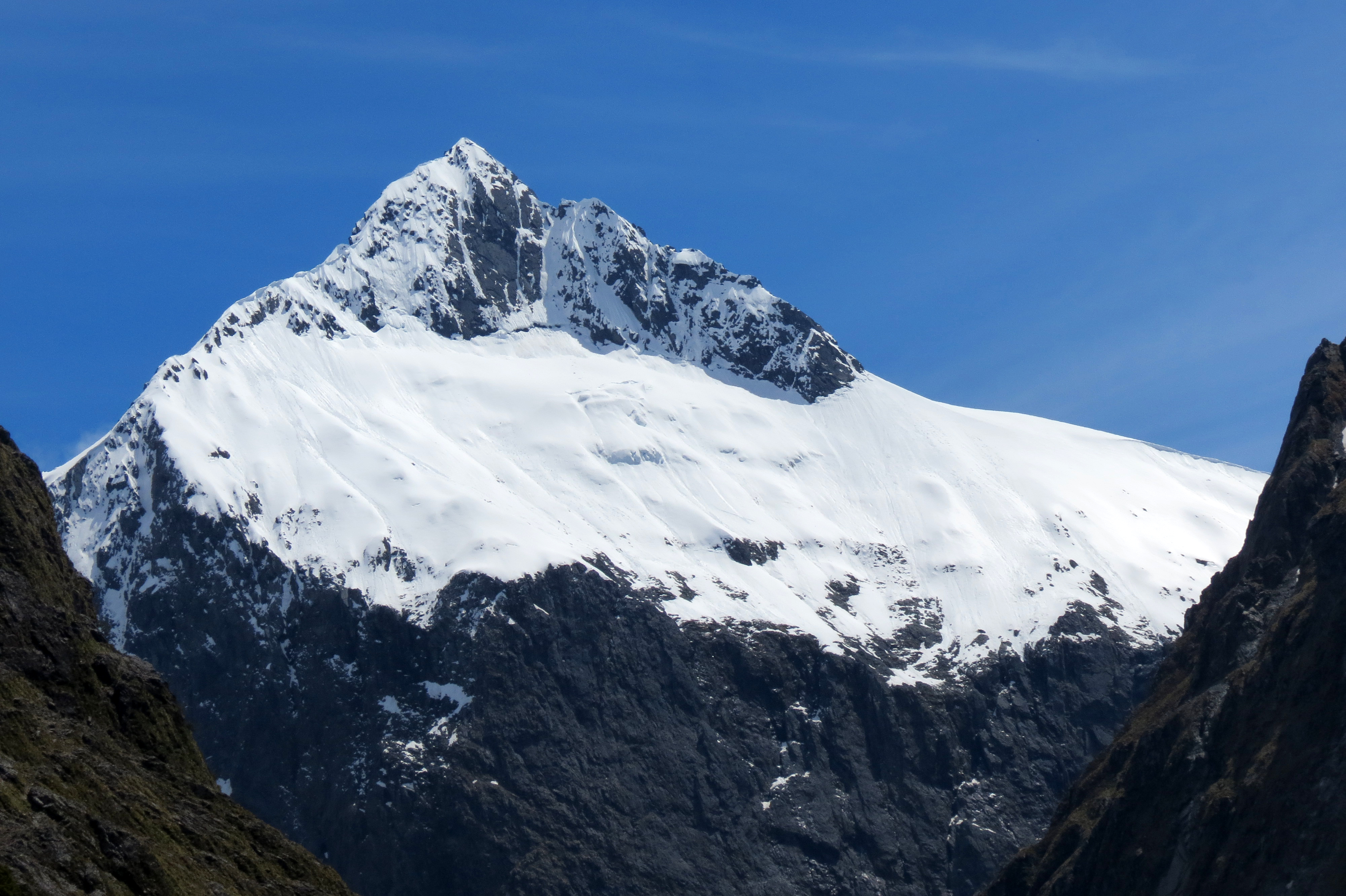
- Southeast aspect

Highest point
- Elevation: 2,105 m (6,906 ft)
- Prominence: 695 m (2,280 ft)
- Isolation: 3.06 km (1.90 mi)
- Coordinates: 44°45′03″S 167°59′51″E

Naming
- Etymology: Arthur Ernest Talbot

Geography
- Location within New Zealand
- Interactive map of Mount Talbot
- Location: South Island
- Country: New Zealand
- Region: Southland
- Protected area: Fiordland National Park
- Parent range: Darran Mountains
- Topo map: Topo50 CB09

Geology
- Rock age: 136 ± 1.9 Ma
- Rock type(s): Gabbronorite, dioritic orthogneiss

Climbing
- First ascent: 1924

Mount Talbot is a 2,105-metre-elevation (6,906-foot) mountain in Fiordland, New Zealand.

== Description ==
Mount Talbot is part of the Darran Mountains and is situated above the Homer Tunnel in the Southland Region of South Island. It is set within Fiordland National Park which is part of the Te Wahipounamu UNESCO World Heritage Site. Precipitation runoff from the mountain drains north into the headwaters of the Gulliver River and south into the headwaters of the Hollyford River. Topographic relief is significant as the summit rises 1,600 metres (5,249 feet) above the Gulliver River in two kilometres and 1,245 metres (4,085 feet) above Gertrude Valley in one kilometre. The nearest higher peak is Mount Crosscut, 3.8 kilometres to the east-southeast.

== History ==
The mountain was named to honour Arthur Ernest Talbot (1876–1917), a New Zealand mountaineer and alpine explorer who was well known for explorations in northern Fiordland, particularly in 1910 discovering a route to Milford near this mountain. He was killed in action in Europe during World War I. This mountain's toponym has been officially approved by the New Zealand Geographic Board. The first ascent of the summit was made in 1924 by George Moir, Ken Roberts, Harry Slater, and Bob Sinclair.

== Climbing ==
Climbing routes with first ascents:

- Couloir Route – George Moir, Ken Roberts, Harry Slater, Bob Sinclair – (1924)
- Notch Route (South Face) – Bill Gordon, Gerry Hall-Jones – (1954)
- Macpherson Cirque – Ralph Miller, Lloyd Warburton, Dick Wood – (1957)
- East Ridge – Bill Blee, Ralph Miller – (1957)
- South West Face – Austin Brookes, Colin Dainty, Ken Hamilton, Ralph Miller – (1965)
- JH Line – Murray Jones, George Harris – (1968)
- Dingle Sissons (South Face) – Graeme Dingle, Noel Sissons – (1972)
- East Ridge Gully – Geoff Gabites, Kevin Rogan – (1973)
- East Ridge Buttress – Pete Moore – (1974)
- Homegrown – Bill Denz, Calum Hudson – (1978)
- Pharaoh – Marty Beare, Lindsay Main – (1980)
- JC Crack – Geoff Gabites, Nigel Perry – (1982)
- Smithereens (North Face) – Leigh Duncan, Calum Hudson, Barry Smith – (1985)
- Neal's Climb (North Face) – Calum Hudson, Barry Smith – (1985)
- Nowhere Man (North Face) – Charlie Hobbs, Calum Hudson – (1985)
- Al Macpherson (South Face) – Allan Uren (solo) – (1992)
- Psychopathy – Matt Evrard, Dave Vass – (1992)
- Psychopath Wall – Gordon Legge, Simon Parsons – (1996)
- Bosshard Ritchie (North Face) – Sam Bosshard, Al Ritchie – (1996)
- Posing for the Paparazzi (South Face) – Allan Uren, Dave Vass – (2000)
- Clearing of Misty Minds (North Face) – Tim Robertson, Rob Wigley – (2000)
- Actions speak loudest – James Edwards, Gary Kinsey, Andrew Young – (2005)
- Geezers Need Excitement (South Face) – S. Fortune, R. Measures – (2012)
- Tears of Papatuanuku – S. Fortune, C. Smith, K. Parsons – (2016)
- Traverse Pass

== Climate ==
Based on the Köppen climate classification, Mount Talbot is located in a marine west coast climate zone. Prevailing westerly winds blow moist air from the Tasman Sea onto the mountain, where the air is forced upward by the mountains (orographic lift), causing moisture to drop in the form of rain and snow. This climate supports small unnamed glaciers on the slopes. The months of December through February offer the most favourable weather for viewing or climbing this peak.

== See also ==
- List of mountains of New Zealand by height
- Fiordland

== Gallery ==
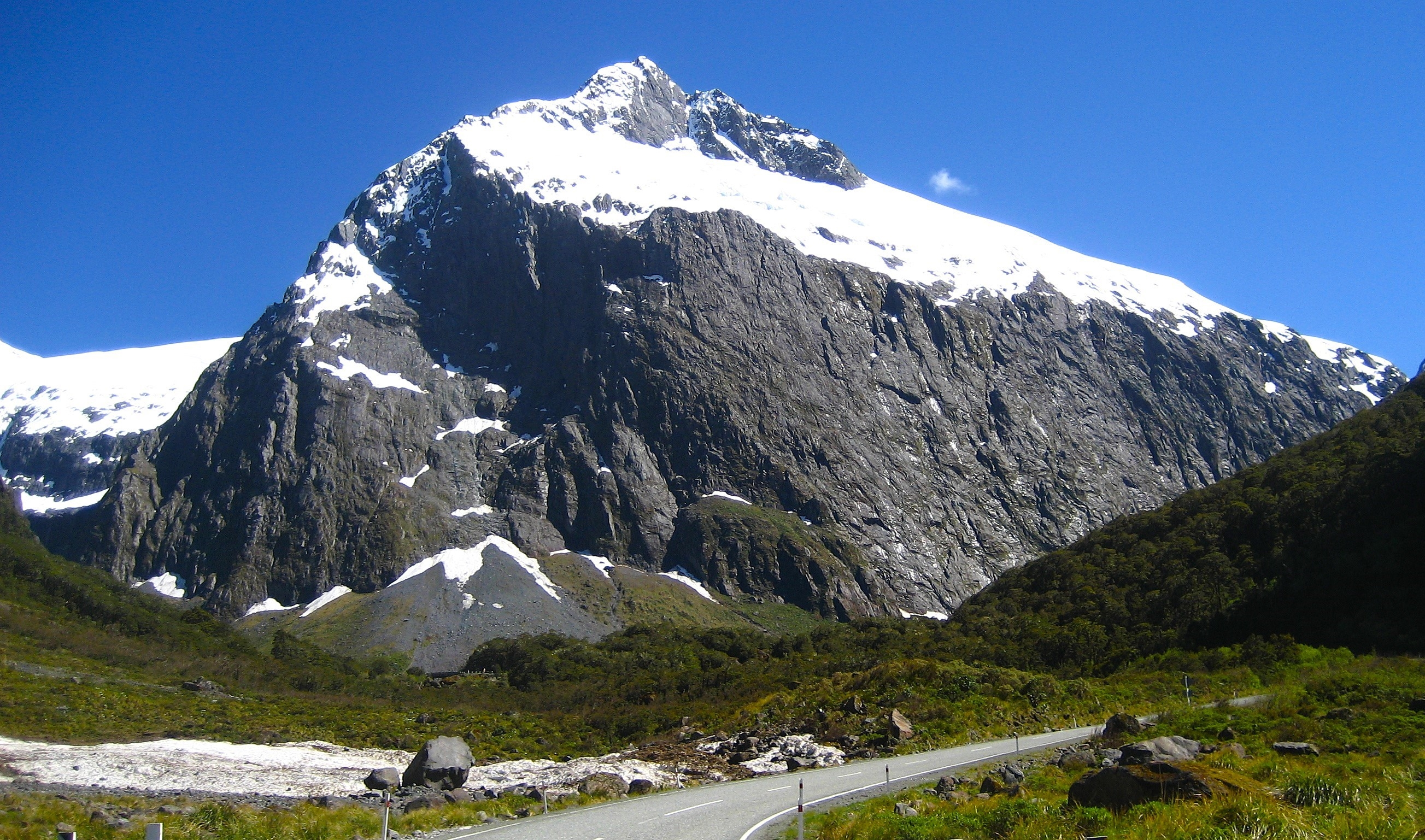

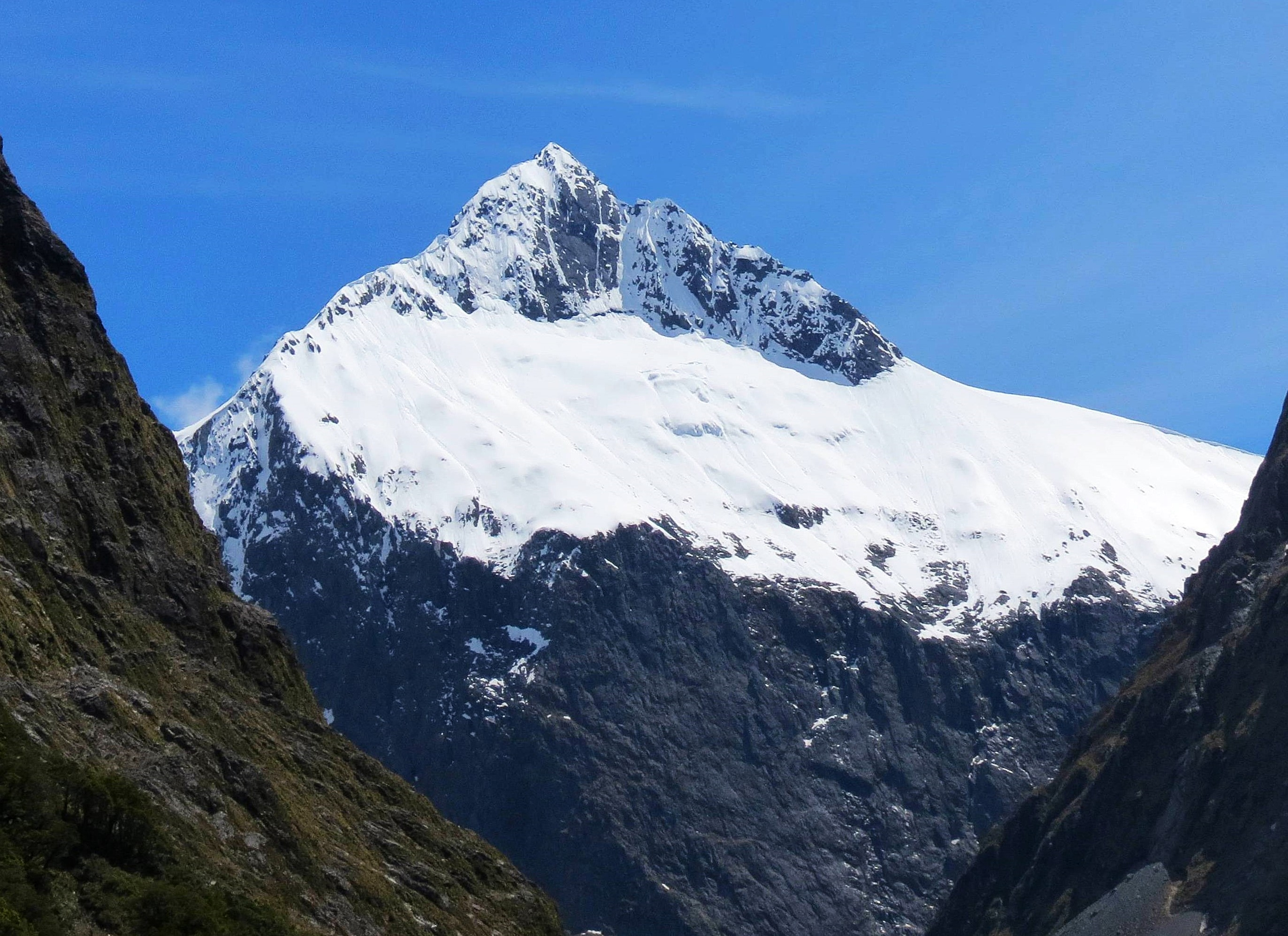

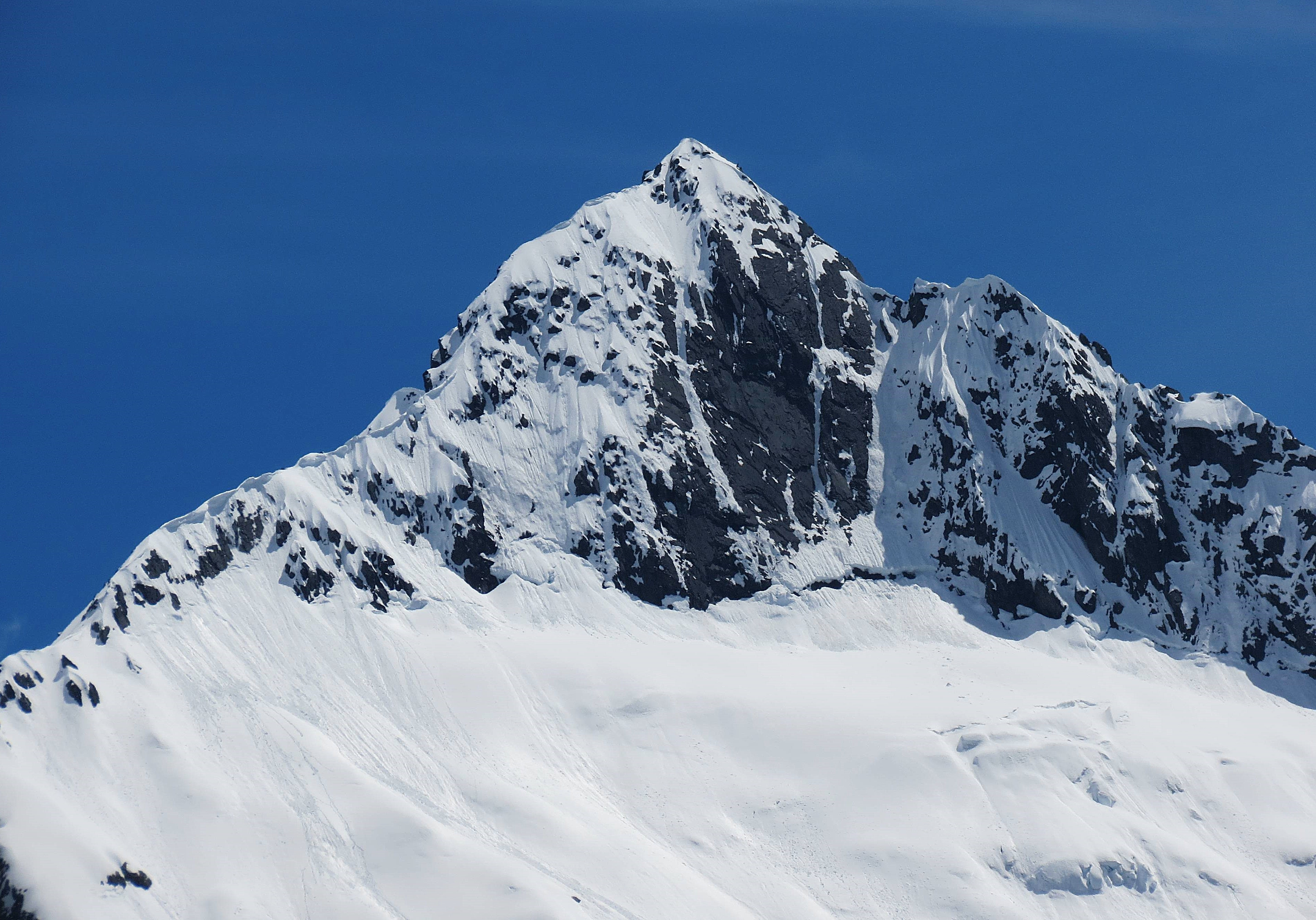

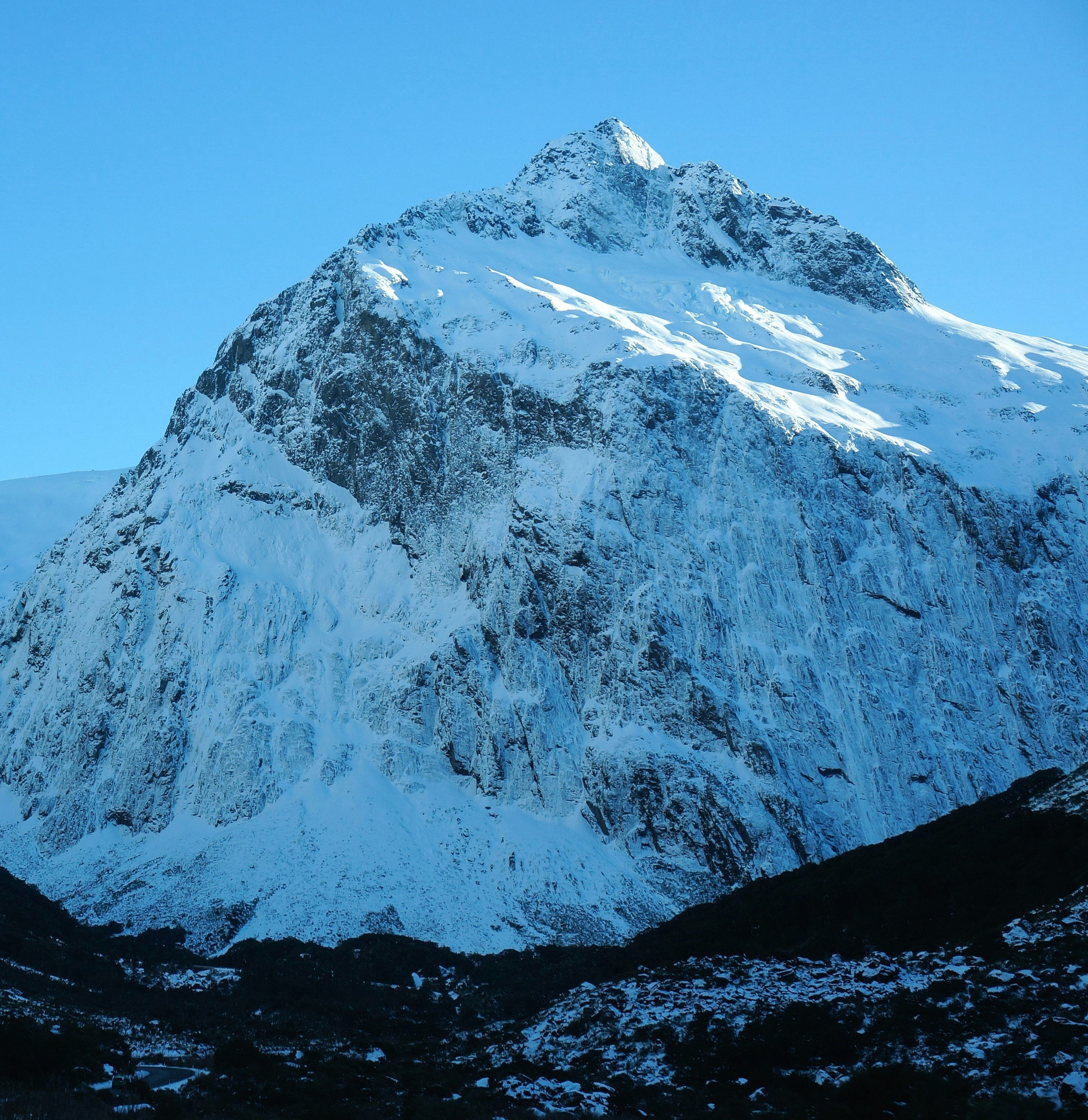

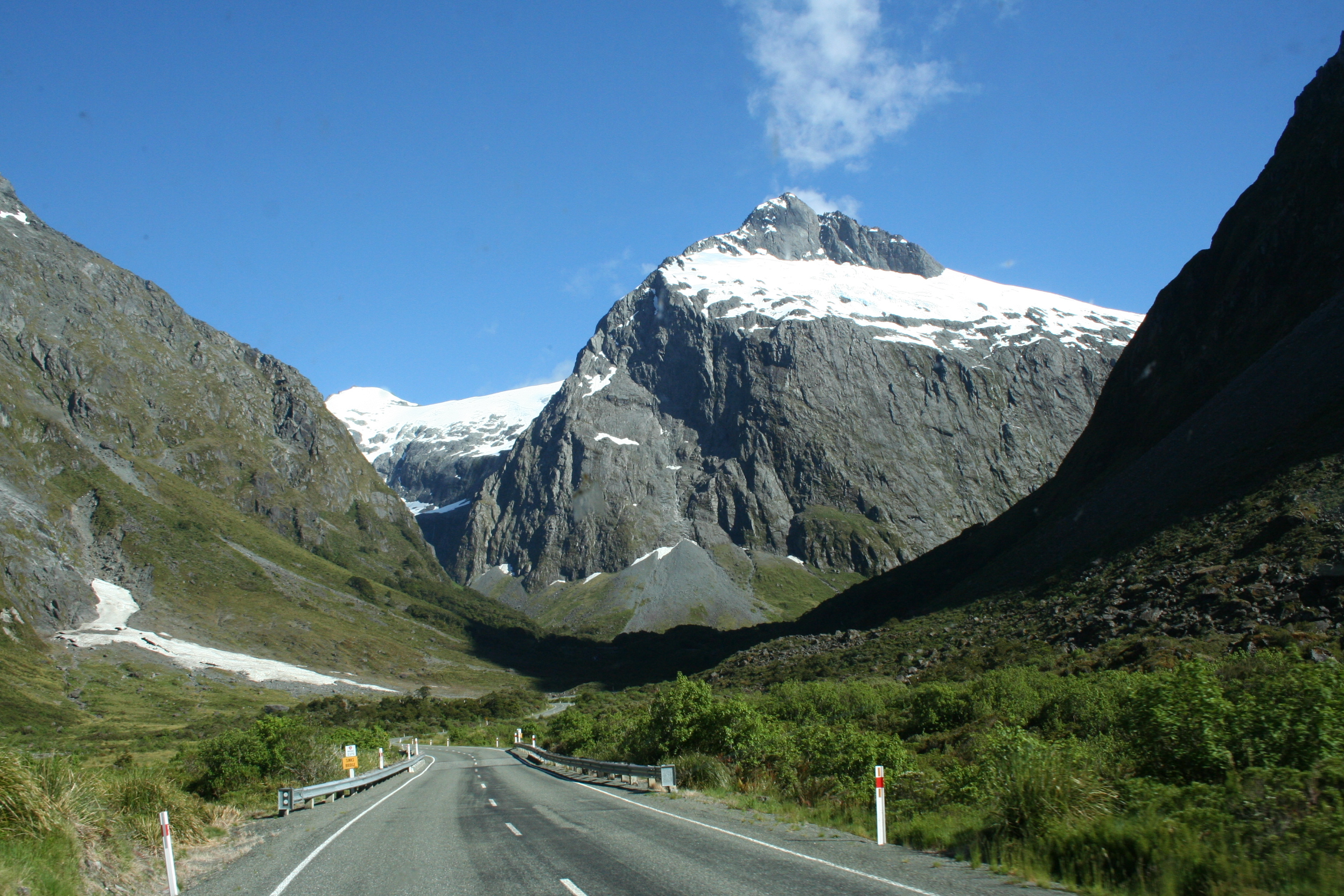

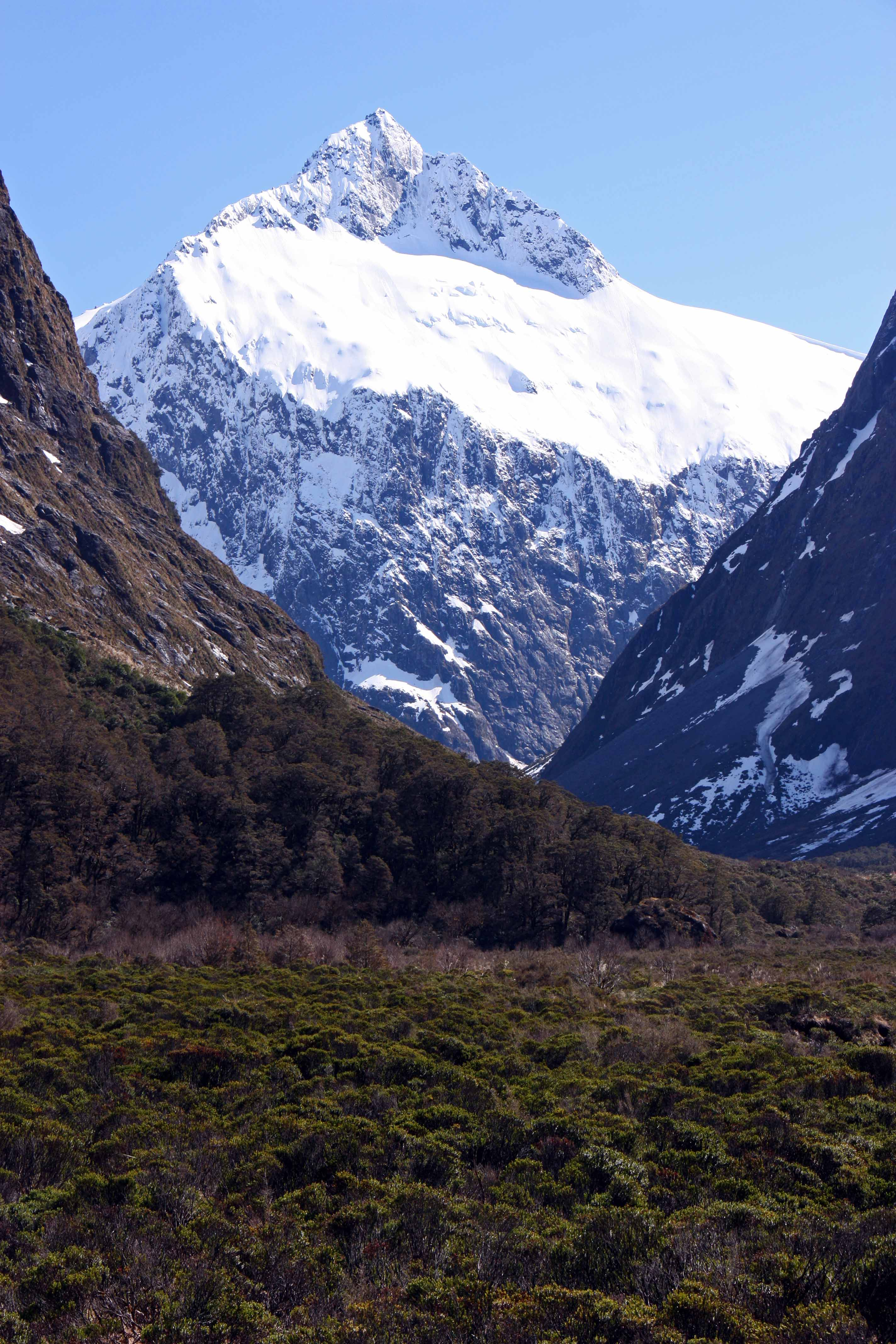

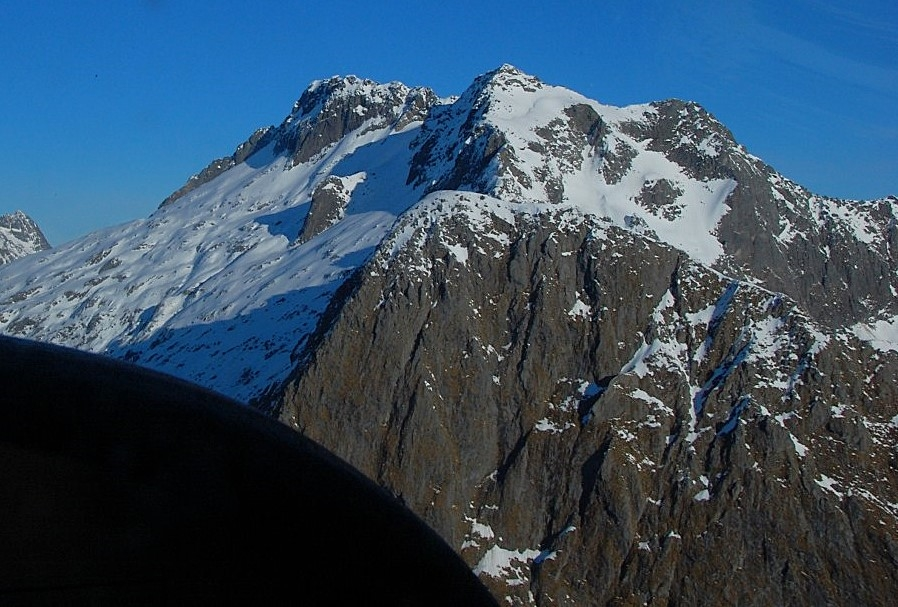
Aerial view from northwest

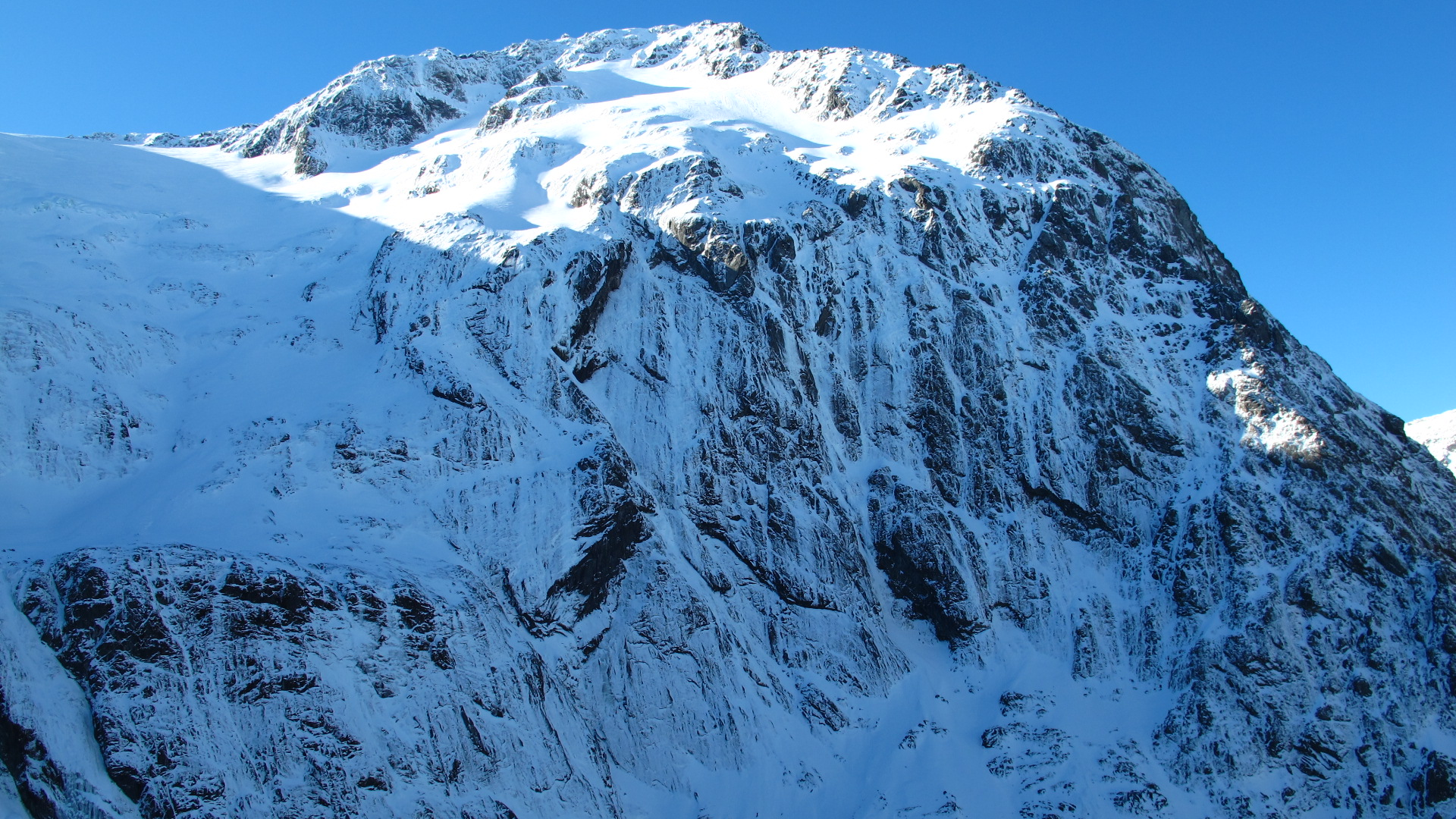
Southwest aspect
