= Arthur River (New Zealand) =

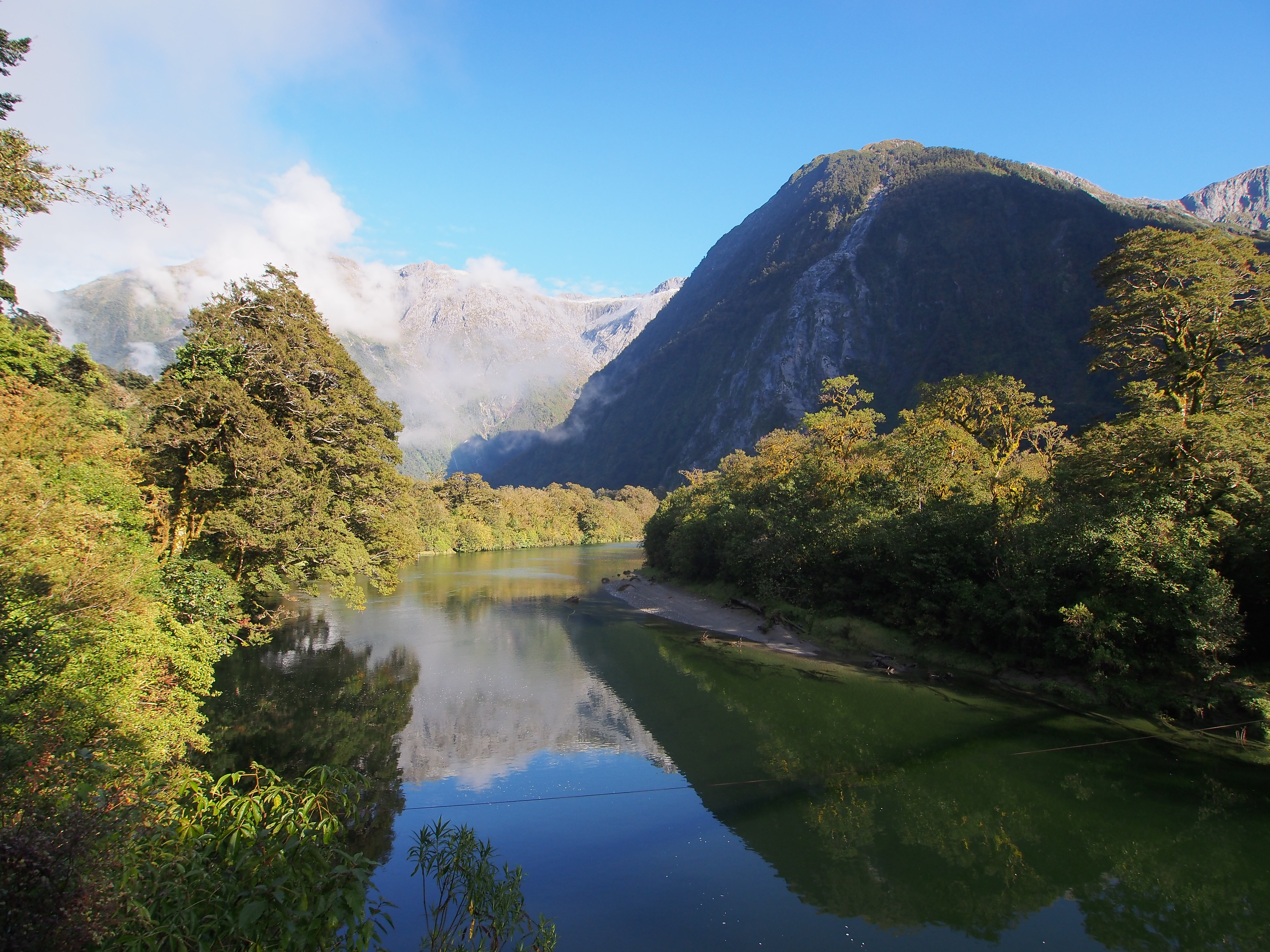
- Arthur River in 2013
- Route of the Arthur River
- Mouth of the Arthur River Arthur River (New Zealand) (South Island) Arthur River (New Zealand) (New Zealand)
- Native name: Te Awa-o-Hine

Location
- Country: New Zealand
- Region: Southland
- District: Southland

Physical characteristics
- Source: Confluence of Roaring Burn and Staircase Creek
  - coordinates: 44°47′43″S 167°44′13″E
- Mouth
  - location: Milford Sound
  - coordinates: 44°41′09″S 167°53′49″E
  - elevation: 0 m (0 ft)

Basin features
- Progression: Arthur River → Milford Sound → Tasman Sea
- Tributaries
  - left: Diamond Creek, Mackay Creek, Poseidon Creek, Camp Oven Creek

The Arthur River (Māori: Te Awa-o-Hine) is a river in Fiordland, New Zealand. It flows into Milford Sound and the final section of the Milford Track follows the river. It flows through Lake Ada, where it is joined by Joes River, and is about 20 km (12 mi) long.

Lake Ada was dammed by a landslide about 900 years ago.

Pāteke lived on the river until the mid-1990s, when stoats spread to the valley. Stoat control, to protect whio, began in 2003 and was extended to the Joes River valley in 2005. Pāteke were reintroduced from a captive breeding stock in 2009, with further releases in 2010 and 2011.

== See also ==
- List of rivers of New Zealand
