= Clinton River (New Zealand) =

River in Southland Region, New Zealand

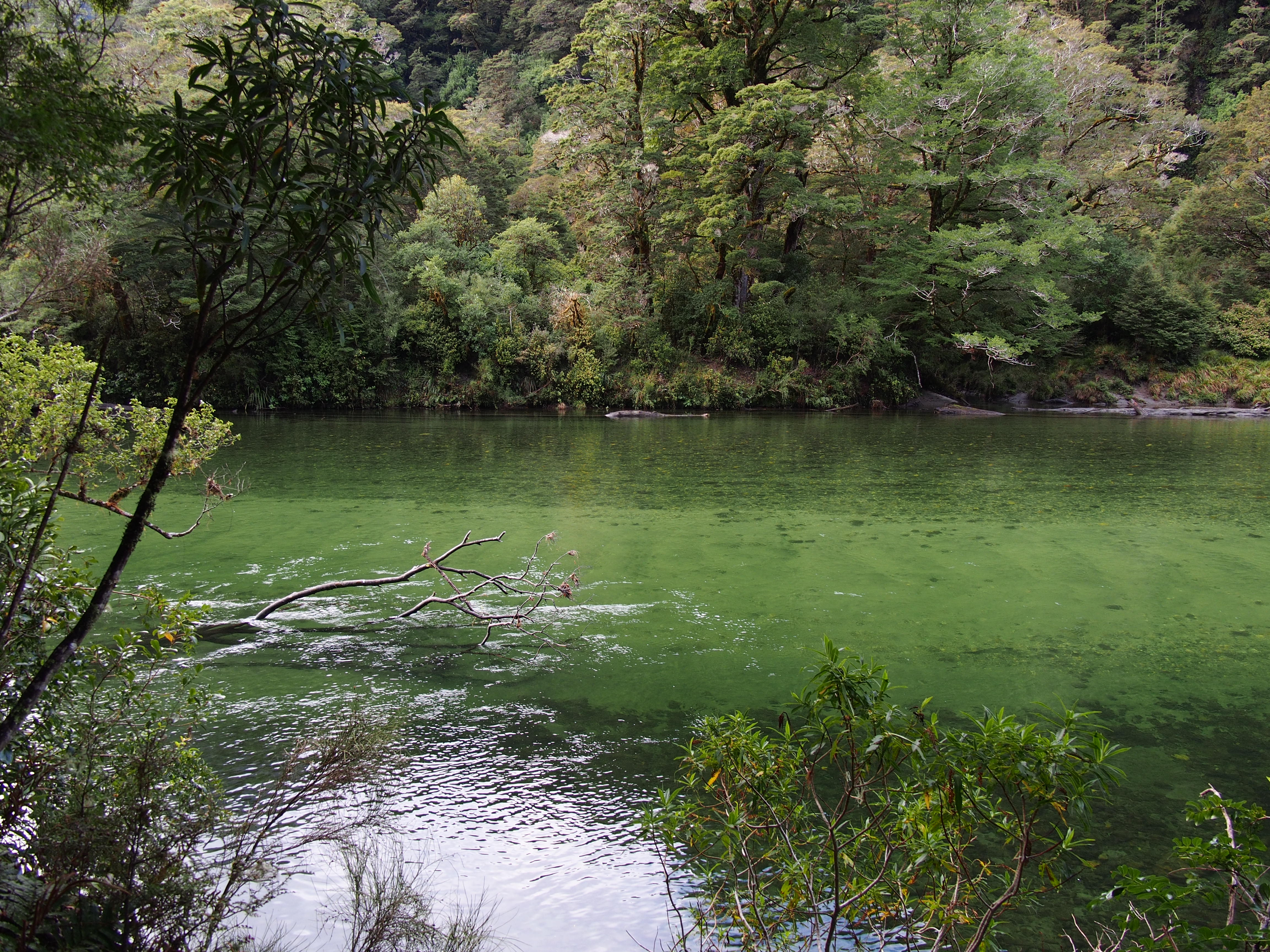
- Clinton River in 2013
- Route of the Clinton River
- Mouth of the Clinton River Clinton River (New Zealand) (South Island)

Location
- Country: New Zealand

Physical characteristics
- Source: Clinton River North Branch
  - location: Mt Elliot
  - coordinates: 44°46′44″S 167°47′57″E
- 2nd source: Clinton River West Branch
  - coordinates: 44°48′50″S 167°45′15″E
- Mouth
  - location: Lake Te Anau
  - coordinates: 44°55′44″S 167°55′38″E
  - elevation: 200 m (660 ft)

Basin features
- Progression: Clinton River → Lake Te Anau → Waiau River → Foveaux Strait
- Tributaries
  - left: Epidote Cataract (north branch), Neale Burn

The Clinton River is a river in the Southland Region of the South Island of New Zealand. There is also a Clinton River in Canterbury, which is a tributary of the Puhi Puhi River.

The river lies completely within the Fiordland National Park and feeds into Lake Te Anau. The Milford Track follows the river from Lake Te Anau and then up the west branch of the river.

Lake Mintaro is a small lake on the west branch of the river.

== Gallery ==
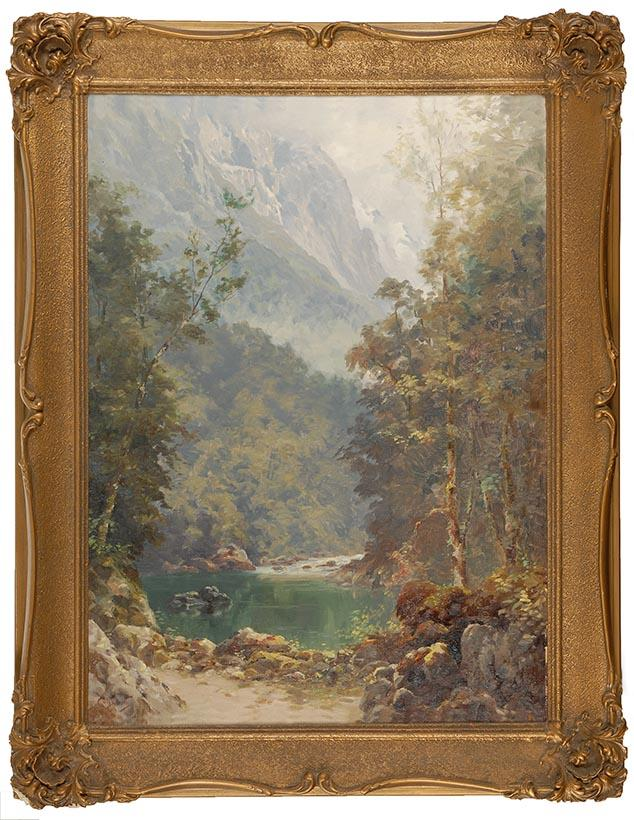
Charles Howorth - Clinton Canyon - showing the Clinton River.

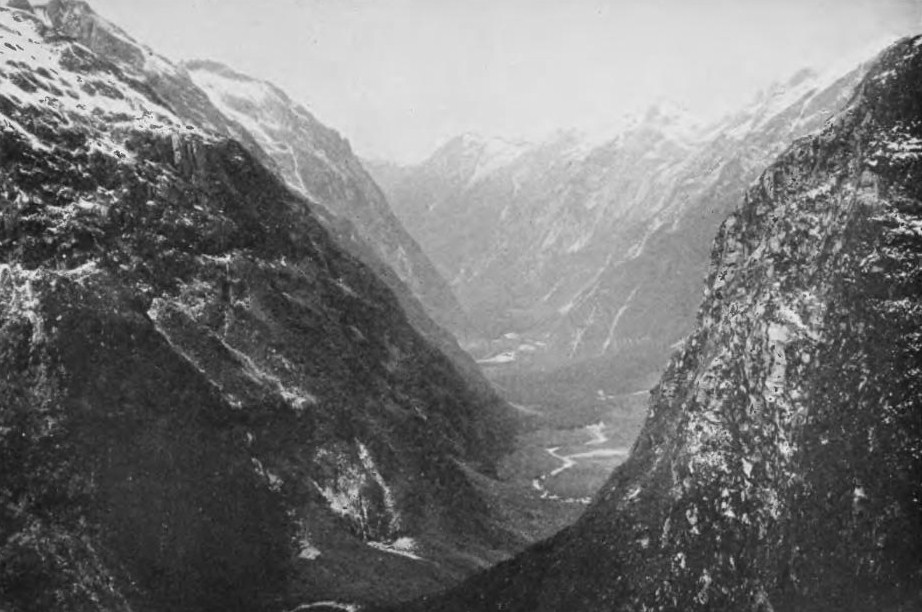
Clinton Canyon

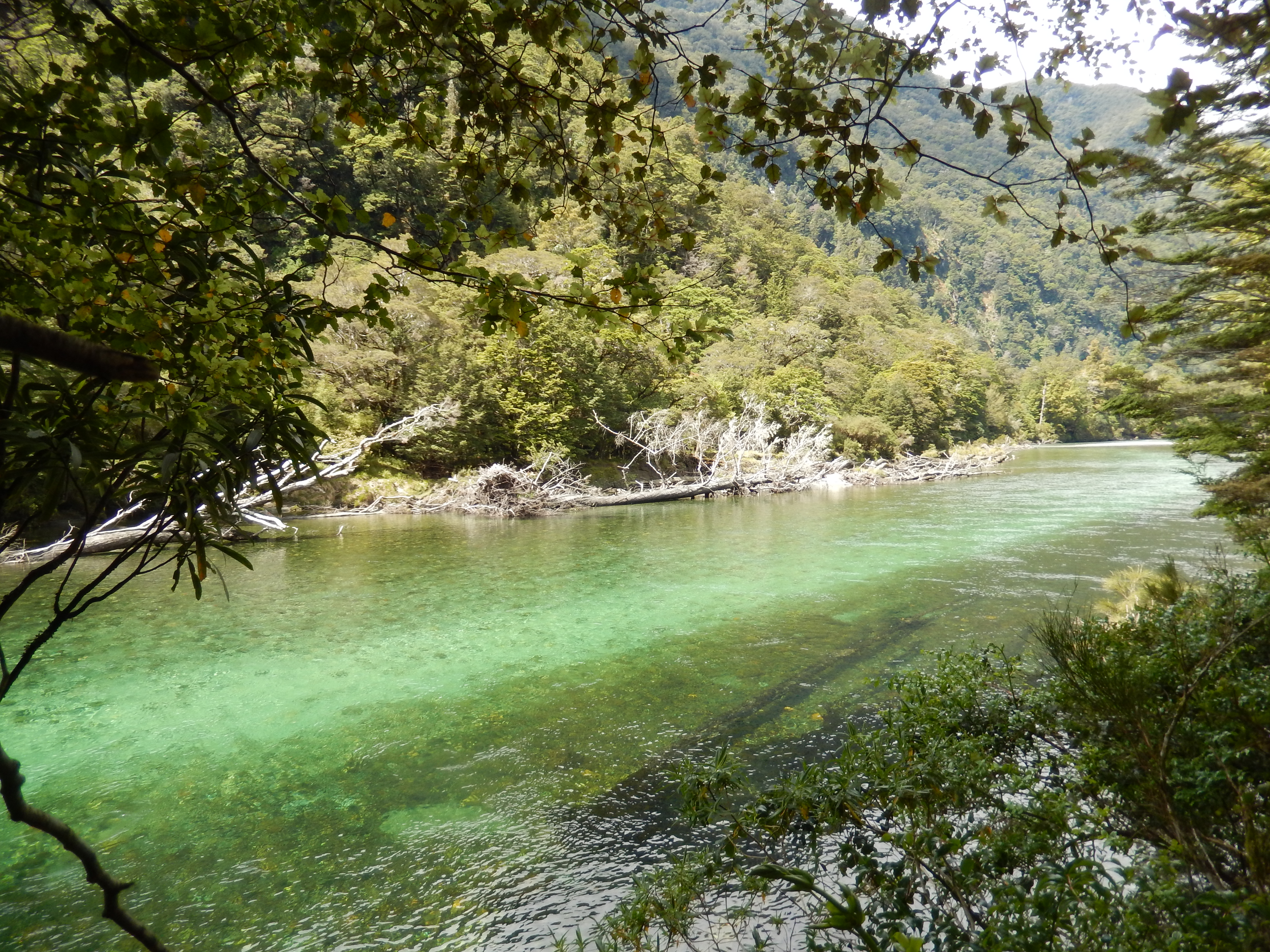
The Clinton River seen from the Milford Track

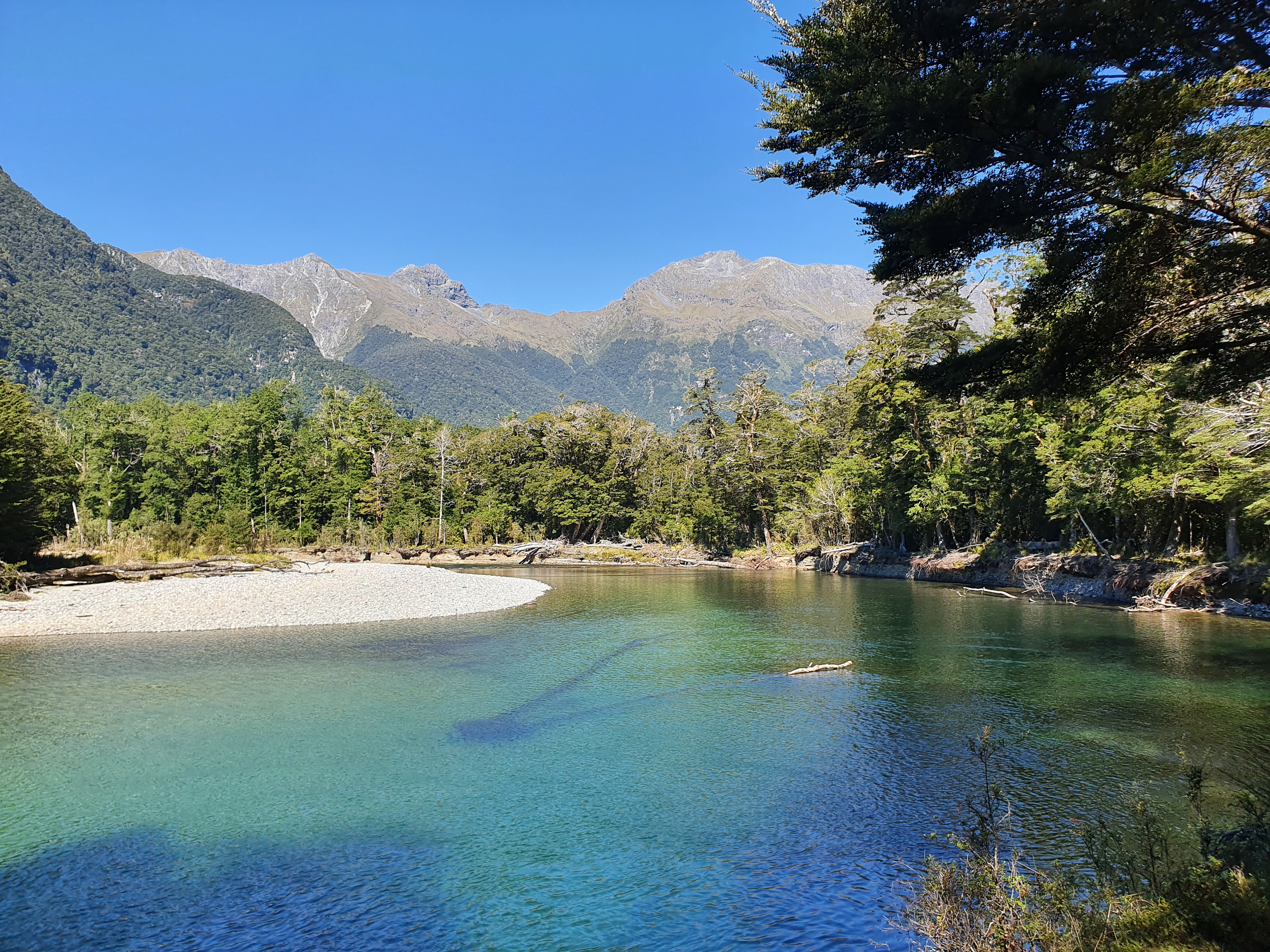
Dore Pass

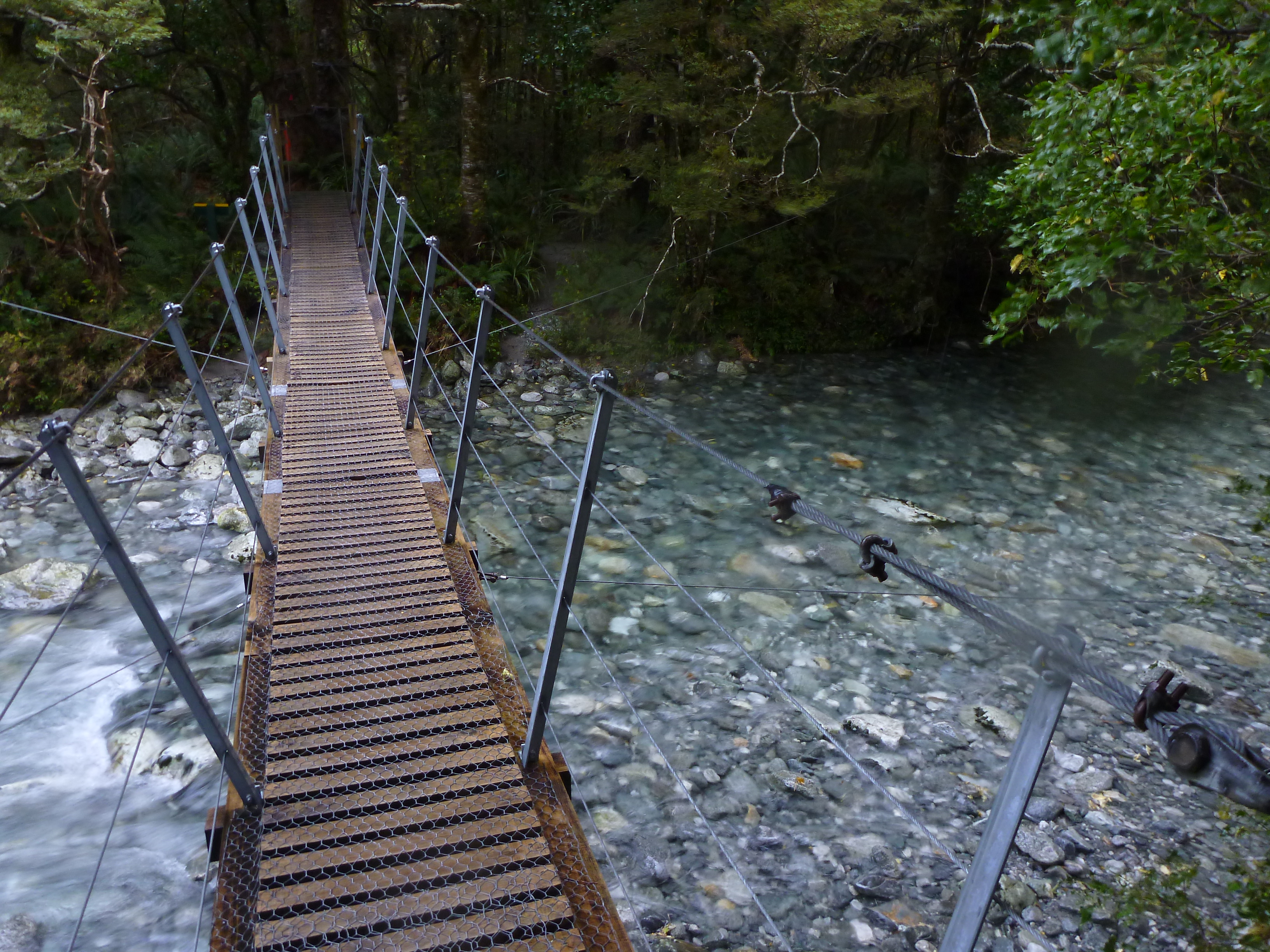
Footbridge across the Clinton River
