= International Meeting of Orthodox Youth =

Annual meeting for Orthodox students

International Meeting of Orthodox Youth Întâlnirea Internațională a Tinerilor Ortodocși
- Genre: Religious meeting
- Frequency: Annually each autumn
- Locations: Romania, Poland
- Inaugurated: September 2014
- Most recent: September 2019
- Website: Website of the 2016 edition Website of the 2022 edition

International Meeting of Orthodox Youth (ITO, Romanian: Întâlnirea Internațională a Tinerilor Ortodocși), formerly known as European Orthodox Youth Reunion (Romanian: Întâlnirea Tinerilor Ortodocși din Europa) is an annual international religious meeting organized by several Orthodox Christian students organizations (ASCOR, Romanian: Asociația Studenților Creștin-Ortodocși din România, translation: Association of Orthodox Christian Students of Romania) in partnership with Romanian Orthodox Church and other Orthodox Churches. The first ITO meeting was held in Baia Mare in 2014.

== List of meetings ==
Participants come from various countries (especially countries with significant orthodox Christian population) such as Romania, Moldova, Ukraine, Greece, Serbia, Albania, North Macedonia, France, Germany, Belgium, Italy, Spain, Portugal, Ireland, United Kingdom, Switzerland, Turkey, Jordan, Syria and some African countries.

ITO meetings
Year	Dates	Country	City	Participants
2014	3–6 September	Romania	Baia Mare	3500
2015	4–7 September	Romania	Cluj-Napoca	5000
2016	1–4 September	Romania	Bucharest	2000
2017	1–4 September	Romania	Iași	6000+
2018	6–9 September	Romania	Sibiu	3000
2019	5–9 September	Romania	Craiova	4000
2023	1-3 September	Romania	Timișoara	3500
2024	30 June – 8 July	Poland	Supraśl	

== See also ==
- Orthodox International Youth Festival "Bratya"
