= Orthodox International Youth Festival "Bratya" =

Annual Russian Orthodox youth festival

The Orthodox International Youth Festival «Bratya» («Brothers», Russian: Православный молодёжный международный фестиваль «Братья») is an annual Russian Orthodox youth festival organized by a group of activists from Mozhaysk, Russia, with the support of various Eastern Orthodox communities, public organizations and individuals. Although the festival is declared as international, traditionally it unites youth of the former USSR. The Festival differs with warm and friendly atmosphere.

The festival is based on complementary components: stage performances; education; informal communication both with the clergy and with each other. Within the framework of the festival educational seminars, thematic discussions with priests, excursions, balls, sports competitions, various master classes, creative performances of Orthodox youth groups and performers of different directions are held.

The festival «Bratya» was first held in July 2005 and since are being held every summer. Since 2008, the winter session of festival "Bratya", also called "Bratya in Winter" was added, and is held annually on February. The summer festival is held as an open-air tent camp event, winter one is usually based in hotels and less populous. To date, 26 festivals have been held, 15 of them in summer and 11 in winter. The venue of the festival changes every time, but periodically the festival returns to the original venue on field of Borodino near Mozhaysk.

== Creation the festival ==
The festival was initiated by Oksana Shashuto's dance studio from the town of Mozhaisk, created in 1994. In August 1997, they went on tour in Paris, where the 12th Catholic World Youth Day was held, which was visited by over a million people. Oksana Shashuto liked the idea: lectures, worships, concerts. According to Oksana Shashuto: "This was a very big work with young people. While we, – that was in '97 – had almost nothing yet, even any camps. And it turned out that we were so close in temper that I began to think: 'Why don't we have this and can't we do something to try to get started?'". At the same time, such events in Russia and the CIS countries were held mainly by Protestants or Catholics, who had considerable experience in holding such events abroad; as Olga Prorok, a journalist from Kyiv, wrote in 2005: "Why, if we hear about an event for youth where speak about God, we confidently say: 'It is sectarians'? And, what is most regrettable, we almost always guess. Looking at the children's camps, skillfully organized by overseas preachers, who hike tours and fascinating excursions, we complain about nimble sectarians who lead inexperienced young children to their sect. And why are we, Orthodox ones, not able to organize anything like this, with rare exceptions?". In the Russian Orthodox Church, at that time, at best, diocesan or parochial summer camps existed, however, by no means everywhere.

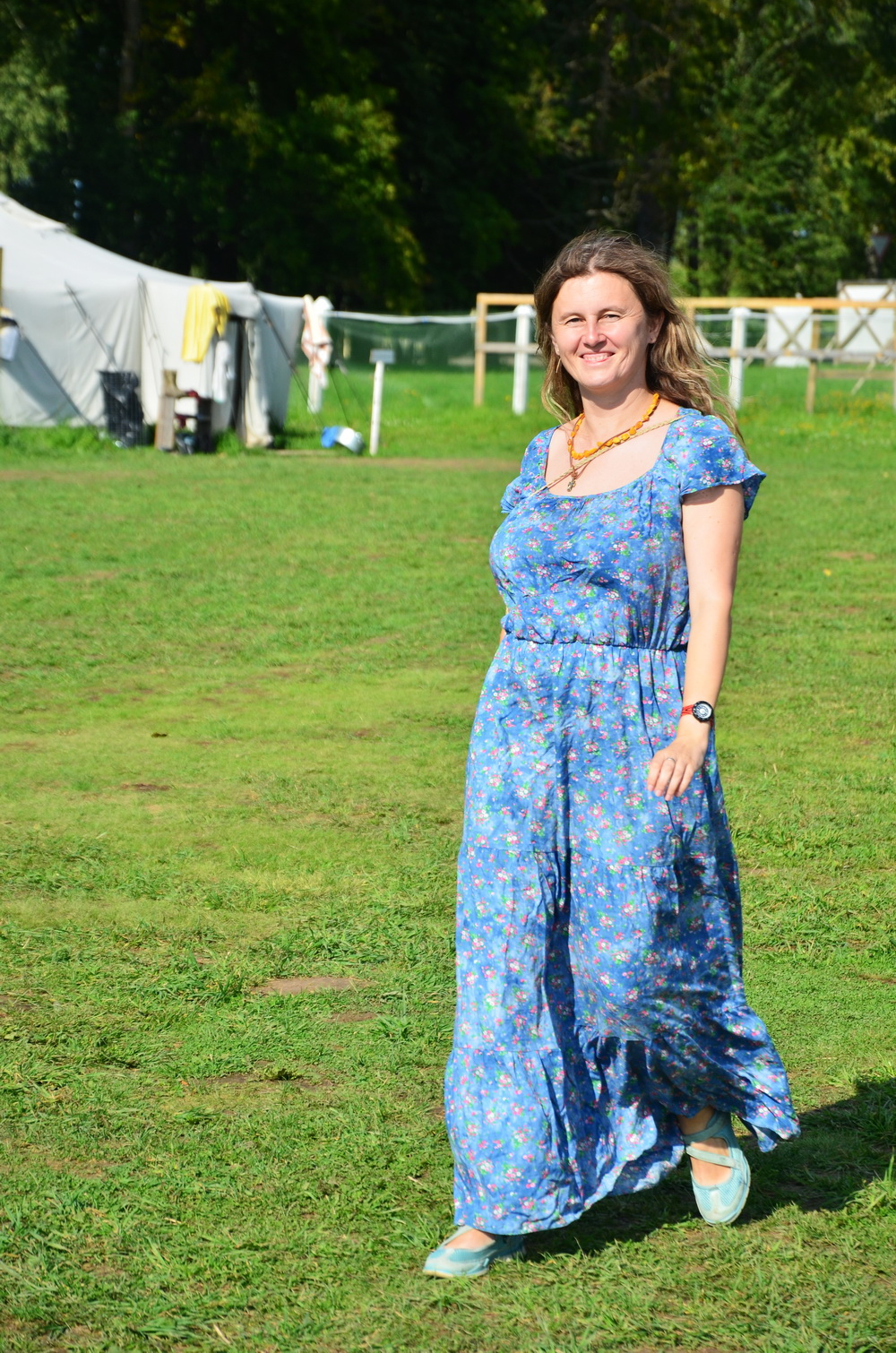
Oxana Shashuto at the 2019 summer festival

And then Oksana Shashuto and her husband Yaroslav Yerofeyev (they got married in 2004) had the idea to hold a church-wide youth festival to "share inter-regional experience, regardless of geographical boundaries". The idea of unity was set in the very name of the festival. As priest Yaroslav Yerofeyev noted: "We conceived this festival in 2004, when the tendencies towards the separation of fraternal peoples had already begun to penetrate into the public consciousness. But we wanted to show that we are all one in Christ, that no political party can rally people as Christ does". Oksana Shaushto at that time had the experience of organizing a dance festival: "We looked at it, asked around, talked, and when I began to figure out Orthodox themes, we decided to make a festival". In addition to the task of togetherness, the organizers tried to bring the festival and the educational component, and also sought to show that young people go to the Orthodox Church, to break the stereotype about the dullness of life of believers and to prove to the young people that they are not alone in their pursuit of God. At the same time, the idea to hold an Orthodox youth festival was not imposed by anyone; in fact, the festival itself was initiated by the young people themselves.

The initiative was supported by Metropolitan Juvenal (Poyarkov) of Krutitsy and Kolomna, Dean of the Mozhaisk Deanery of the Moscow Oblast Diocese hieromonk Daniel (Zhirnov), the head of the Mozhaisk District Vladimir Nasonov. According to Yaroslav Yerofeyev: "Everyone perceived this idea very correctly and gave every assistance. The day was chosen, the place, the guys were prepared". The first volunteers who organized the festival were high school students who had studied at the Oksana Shashuto Dance Studio. The Borodino field was chosen as place of the festival since it was place of "military exploits of our ancestors in 1812 and 1941,". To inform potential participants about the festival information was posted on the Internet.

The first festival was held since July 18 to July 24, 2005, from Monday to Sunday. Both participants and organizers of the festival lived in simple tents. The food was brought from the school cafeteria of Mozhaisk. Already at the first festival a general concept was evolved; the organizers adhered it hereinafter: services, lectures of invited guests, excursions to the surrounding sights, improvised concerts on the stage specially built during the festival, an auditorium under an awning next to it, "bonfire" with songs and informal communication, mini-conversations (at the first festival they were called "round tables"), festival procession to the Kolotsky Monastery, the prohibition of drinking and smoking in the camp, playing the angels, and the night liturgy, followed by almost all the participants of the festival Communion, many for the first time. According to eyewitnesses, the festival was "with an unprecedented rise". When parting, the participants embraced each other and then declared that such holidays should be held constantly. For holding this festival and "missionary and educational activities among youth," the head of the Ukrainian Orthodox Church, Metropolitan Vladimir (Sabodan), in October of the same year awarded Oksana Shashuto the order of the Rev. Nestor the Chronicler.

Immediately after the end of the first festival, the organizers began to prepare for the second one. The site www.bratia.ru was organized, its participants began to visit each other, to communicate. On October 29, 2006, Yaroslav Yerofeyev was ordained a priest and became the spiritual father of the festival. As the number of participants increased, the organizers decided to hold festivals in other localities. In addition, "for those who do not want to part with the Summer Festival "Bratya" for a long time and with everyone with whom he became friends and became so close during this time" it was decided to open the winter session of the festival. The winter festival was first held in February 2008 in the village of Ust-Chorna in Zakarpattia Oblast. It had fewer concerts, but more lectures and conversations with priests. The summer festival of the same year was held near Kyiv. Since then, "in order to strengthen friendly relations and cultural traditions between the youth of different countries", the festival venue changed every time, but the festival regularly returned to the Borodino field, becoming a kind of visiting card of the Mozhaysky District.

== Dates and places ==
1. July 18–24, 2005, Borodino field, Mozhaisk District, Moscow Oblast, Russia.
2. July 17–23, 2006, Borodino field, Mozhaisk District, Moscow Oblast, Russia.
3. July 15–22, 2007, Borodino field, Mozhaisk District, Moscow Oblast, Russia.
4. February 10–16, 2008, village Ust-Chorna, Tiachiv Raion, Zakarpattia Oblast, Ukraine
5. July 23 – August 2, 2008, village Glebovka, Vyshhorod Raion, Kyiv Oblast, Ukraine.
6. February 7–15, 2009, the village Vvedenye, Yaroslavsky District, Yaroslavl Oblast, Russia.
7. July 19–26, 2009, Borodino field, Mozhaisk District, Moscow Oblast, Russia.
8. February 1–8, 2010, Serafimovich, Volgograd Oblast, Russia.
9. July 17–25, 2010, the territory of the ski resort "Silichy", Lahoysk District, Minsk Oblast, Belarus.
10. July 16–24, 2011, Borodino field, Mozhaisk District, Moscow Oblast, Russia.
11. February 12–18, 2012, St. Petersburg, Russia
12. July 21–26, 2012, village Vilino, Bakhchysarai Raion, Crimea, Ukraine.
13. February 3–10, 2013, Grodno, Belarus.
14. July 20–28, 2013, village Kholki, Chernyansky District, Belgorod Oblast, Russia.
15. July 19–27, 2014, Borodino field, Mozhaisk District, Moscow Oblast, Russia.
16. February 2–9, 2015, Jerusalem.
17. July 18–26, 2015, Borodino field, Mozhaisk District, Moscow Oblast, Russia.
18. February 1–7, 2016, Kostroma, Russia.
19. July 16–24, 2016, Zaslavl, Minsk District, Minsk Oblast, Belarus.
20. February 5–12, 2017, Salavat, Bashkortostan, Russia.
21. July 15–23, 2017, Borodino field, Mozhaisk District, Moscow Oblast, Russia.
22. February 4–11, 2018, Limassol, Cyprus.
23. August 4–12, 2018, village Rastopulovka, Privolzhsky District, Astrakhan Oblast, Russia.
24. February 3–10, 2019, Ryazan, Russia.
25. August 3–11, 2019, Borodino field, Mozhaysk Urban District, Moscow Область, Russia.
26. February 4–11, 2020, Italy.
27. July–August 2020, Brothers on the Wings, Russia
28. February 1—7, 2021, Kostroma, Russia
29. August 7—14, 2021, Pitsunda, Abkhazia
30. January 29 – February 6, 2022, Armenia
31. August 6 – 13, 2022, near Mozhaisk, Moscow region, Moscow Область, Russia.

== Festival goals and objectives ==
=== Association of Orthodox Youth ===
The festival organizers aim to unite Orthodox youth from various countries, regardless of state borders and ethnic differences, to give an opportunity to communicate with each other, to expand their circle of friends by several dozen people, to "give each other the love and warmth of their hearts". Mainly these efforts were aimed at uniting young people from Russia, Ukraine and Belarus. According to Oksana Shashuto, the goal of the festival is "to bring young people from different cities and different countries together, to show that Orthodox people live everywhere, that there are many of us, and we can be together. ... No boundaries can divide us, and no politicians are able to embroil". This goal became particularly relevant after the outbreak of hostilities in eastern Ukraine and the serious complication of relations between the three Eastern Slavic states in 2014. The very name of the festival, according to Oksana Shashuto, "most accurately conveys the unity and brotherhood of all, and not isolation in individual parishes".

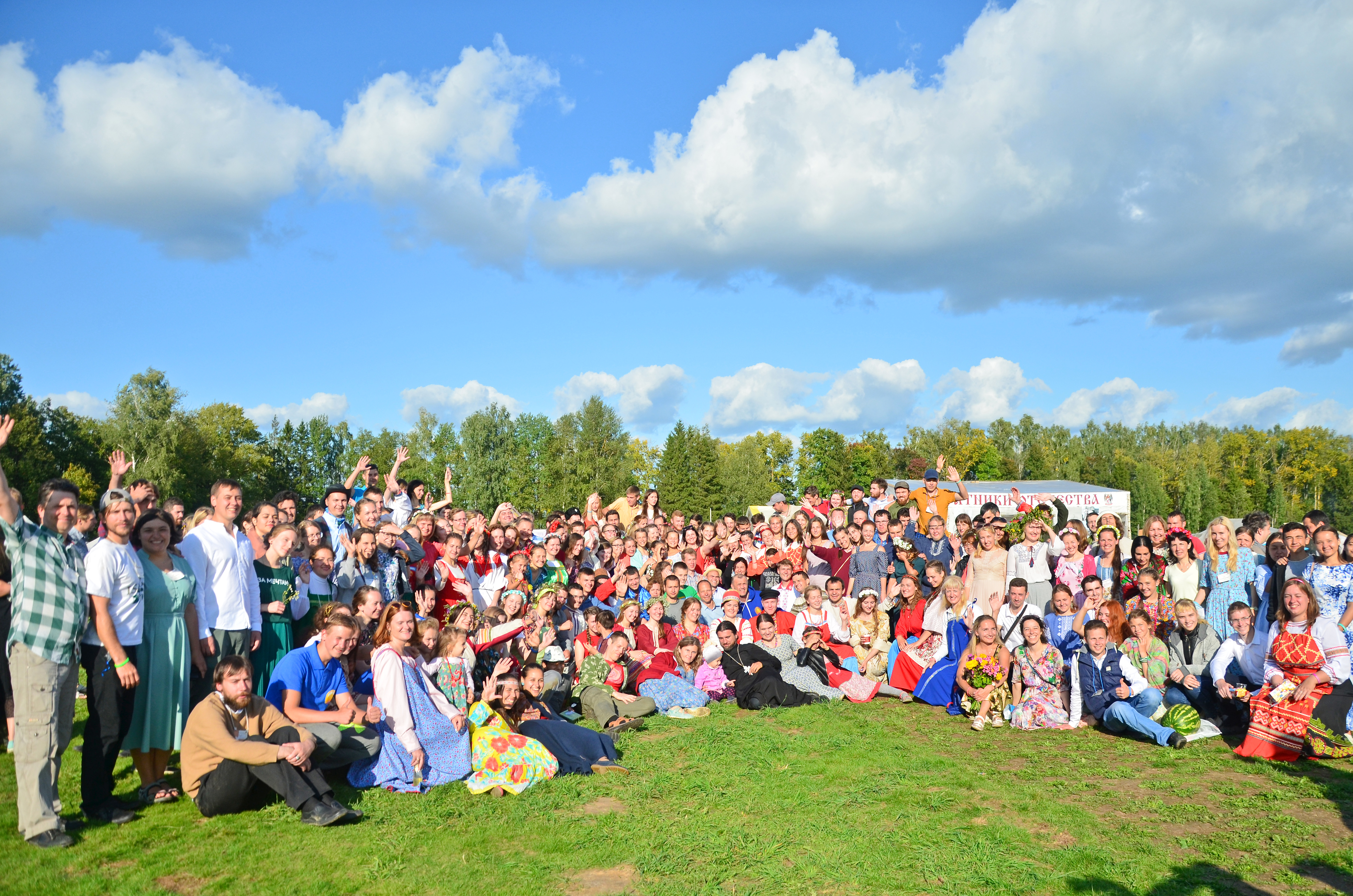
Photo of the participants of the 2019 Summer Festival

The festival organizers also set as their goal "the embodiment in the life of the brotherhood, friendship and unity of the Orthodox Church". As noted by Priest Vyacheslav Haplichnik, who organized the winter festival of 2013: "The festival is a unique platform for communication of Orthodox youth from different countries. Because people can lose unity. The composition of the Russian church is very large. Often, Ukraine does not have contacts with Lithuanian youth, and Moscow does not know Belarus. And here very strong ties are established for many years". In 2005, Olga Prorok described the goals of the organizers in this way: "Absolutely human communication is necessary for absolutely everyone, including the Orthodox. Through joint prayer, works, games of the heart are thawed, they become cleaner and more tender – they open up for the neighbor, and therefore for God". Alina Ryazanova wrote in 2011: "At the festival, many young people understand that they are not alone in their faith and good deeds, that Orthodoxy does not disappear, but, on the contrary, continues to exist, expanding more and more".

At the same time, according to Oksana Shashuto, the festival failed to achieve its main goal – "to gather and unite the youth who came to the Orthodox Church". If initially the organizers of the festival "Bratya" characterized it as "An unprecedented event in the world of youth and Orthodox Christianity", over time similar events for Orthodox youth began to appear in many dioceses, and many of their organizers gained experience specifically on "Bratya" festival. "People who come to us were delighted with the fact that we are here all together, and then they leave for themselves, and in the diocese they are told to do the same with them. Then we can not get any good priests, nor young people, because they all put on certain roles, and they should now make mini-Bratya themselves. We beg to invent something of our own, to take advantage of the rich imagination and knowledge. But even adults in Moscow with knowledge and money are still trying to duplicate everything that we do. ... It would be cool if there were several major different activities and you could ride them. But people cannot come simply because they have been asked to be counselors, organizers in another place, and priests must hold conversations there ... Over the years, this has become increasingly apparent, and we don't know at all what to do about it. New people come, but also dissolve".

Thus, in 2011, the youth union of the Belarusian Orthodox Church, together with the Synodal Youth Affairs Department of the Ukrainian Orthodox Church, organized the annual youth educational forum "Quo vadis?" In Belarus; In 2016, the youth department of the Moscow City Diocese created the annual youth educational volunteer forum named DobroLeto; in 2018, the Synodal Department of the UOC on Youth Affairs organized the Orthodox Youth Festival "OrthoFest".

=== Educational and cognitive ===
According to Oksana Shashuto, while preparing for the first festival, "the organizers mainly pursued educational goals. We wanted to tell the young about Orthodoxy, to introduce them to the faith". For this, according to the priest Yaroslav Yerofeyev, "we invite people who may and able to speak in a living, ordinary human tongue. Not in the language of books and catechism, but in a living language to talk about the basics of the faith". The organizers seek to invite to the festival bright church preachers and generally interesting people who can also tell about their path to God. According to a long-term participant of the festival and the organizer of the School of Volunteers Victoria Anikeyeva: "The main goal of the festival is educational. ... It is assumed that people will not just rest, and I assure you that they will communicate well, but will nevertheless take away some fruits from this festival". In addition to lectures, the program of festivals provides for intellectual and educational games, excursions, master classes. Archimandrite Jonah (Cherepanov) noted in 2011: "It is amazing how young people have an unfulfilled thirst for knowledge about Orthodoxy, how much the guys are eager to hear the answers to the most important questions from the mouth of the priest. It is insulting to tears for them, that they cannot talk at home with the priest, many people cannot really confess".

According to the priest Yaroslav Yerofeyev: "The main idea of the festival is the selection of such events that would give young people the opportunity to understand the meaning of life for themselves, and with the help of numerous faith friends strengthen themselves in the correctness of the chosen path". The organizers of the festival strive to show to young people the "beauty of Orthodox Christianity, to reveal it in all possible directions. And so that those who came to church – strengthened their faith, who only watched, came for the company to gain this faith".

From the very beginning of the festival, its organizers tried to introduce an element of patriotic education of young people. In addition, the organizers during the first festivals sought to attract patriotic youth: "Everyone who considers themselves young and all for whom Holy Russia and Orthodox Faith are dear is invited!" – a 2013 advertisement stated.

=== Creativity ===
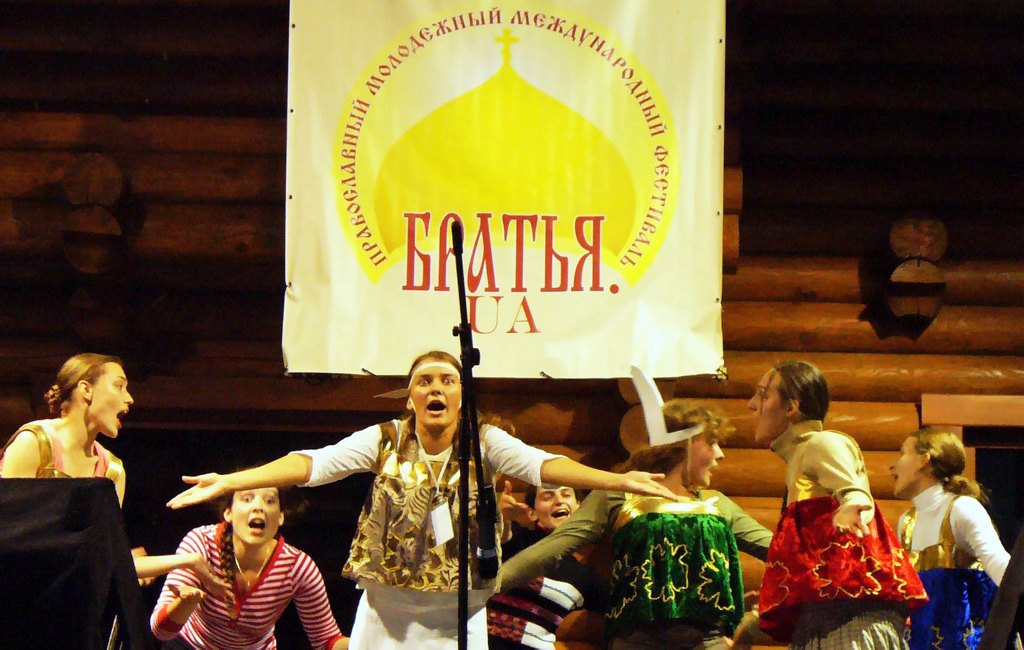
«Mozhaisk Hares». 2008 summer festival.

Although initially the main purpose of the festival was educational, a creative component was also provided, which was done not only to raise the mood of the festival participants, but also to debunk the idea of Orthodox young people as closed and notorious people, to show that Orthodox youth are "involved in creativity and in various arts," and the secular program of theater, dance groups, musicians, bards, and rock poets is completely compatible with the Orthodox faith. Archpriest Evgeny Gening, chairman of the Moscow Oblast Diocese Department for Work with Youth, supported this initiative in 2005: "The life of the church is determined not only by monastic charters and traditions, although, of course, it occupy a significant place in Orthodox Christianity. But this is not the whole church life, there must be a place for creativity, for a variety of different forms. ... There are no violations of the canons of the church in that young people sing songs about human life, soul, relationships, and decent dances. ... We breed in different directions [pop music and] liturgical traditions, sanctified by the thousand-year experience of the Church, where the appearance of the guitar is excluded. But if the same guitar is used in the creativity – for God's sake, the creativity of us only unites us".

Already in preparation for the first festival, the organizers sought to involve Orthodox youth in the music, theater, and dance arts to participate in it. According to Oksana Shashuto: "The goal of the festival performances is to show that there are talents in Orthodox Church, and to find them". About the first concert at the first festival of 2005, Olga Prorok wrote: "It turns out that the Orthodox people also know how to sing, dance, and humor. Yes, everything is so nice, kindly, not at all like in hackneyed pub scenes". As Arina Ivanova noted: "Everyone who has some talent can apply it: sing, dance, if the organizer has the capacity to be a volunteer, know how to do something with your own hands, hold a master class".

As Oksana Shashuto noted in 2017, compared with the first festivals, "entertainment has increased, but we have determined for ourselves that we will not do a party".

== Preparation and implementation ==
=== Selection of venue ===
The organizers of the festival are Mozhaysk deanery with the participation of the diocesan department of the Moscow Regional Diocese for Youth Affairs and the Mozhaysk Administration with the assistance of the benefactors of this town and region. In other venues, co-organizers are local Orthodox organizations and administrations. The festival organizers work with representatives of various dioceses and organizations, and therefore any of the cities of the post-Soviet space can become the host of the next festival "Bratya". If agreement is reached, the organizers begin preparations for the festival with them, and such negotiations can begin several years before the festival itself is held in a particular place. As priest Yaroslav Yerofeyev noted: "Everything depends on the local organizers. That is, in this case we are already acting as consultants, we are looking for the program to be filled with those events that are characteristic of the festival, so that the spirit of the festival itself is preserved. And the organizers who are on the ground help us all, they are very experienced people, we don't just trust anyone to organize the festival". Also in 2013, Oksana Shashuto noted that "often the people to whom we turn do not fulfill their promises. A lot of things break down at the last moment, because of which, of course, the quality suffers". All festivals are held with the blessing of the ruling bishop of the diocese in area of which its are held.

For each festival, the organizers choose their motto; as a rule, this is a quotation from the New Testament. The motto becomes visible on the festival site already at the beginning of registration for the festival.

=== Festival funding and participation fee ===
The festival "Bratya" has no permanent external sources of funding. Sponsorship throughout the history of the festival was irregular and insufficient. According to Oksana Shashuto: "The Lord does not send us money, sponsors, and we cannot do anything with it. Maybe sometime this will change, but it already seems that our destiny is unmercenariness". On the official festival website there is a page "Help for the festival" with bank details, where it is written: "any financial assistance is very much required for the festival".

In such circumstances, the main source of funding are contributions from the participants of the festival. At the same time, the organizers try not to inflate fees, making participation in the festival as accessible as possible for Orthodox youth, who, in addition to the festival, have to pay for the road to it, which makes it difficult for young people from remote regions of Russia to participate in the festival. In addition, traveling from remote regions is not only expensive, but also long. So the participant of the summer festival of 2014 from Abakan traveled by train to the Borodino field for 3 and a half days. For this reason participants from distant regions of Russia can count on some discount if they need.

Volunteers who organize and support the work of the festival not get money for their work, even if it is heavy. Moreover, they even had to pay for their participation in the "School of Volunteers", since the festival failed to receive a grant.

The clergy participate in the festival for free. That is, administration do not take money for living and boarding, but they not receive any remuneration. Priests come to the festival on their own initiative and for the sake of communicating with young people.

Participants pay participation in the festival either directly by transferring money to the accounts of the organizers, or through contact persons. When registering for the summer festival of 2015, the "Generous" fee was introduced when the participant, when paying for his participation in the festival, could voluntarily transfer 500 and more rubles more. This was done so that those with insufficient funds could come to the festival.

=== Festival participants ===
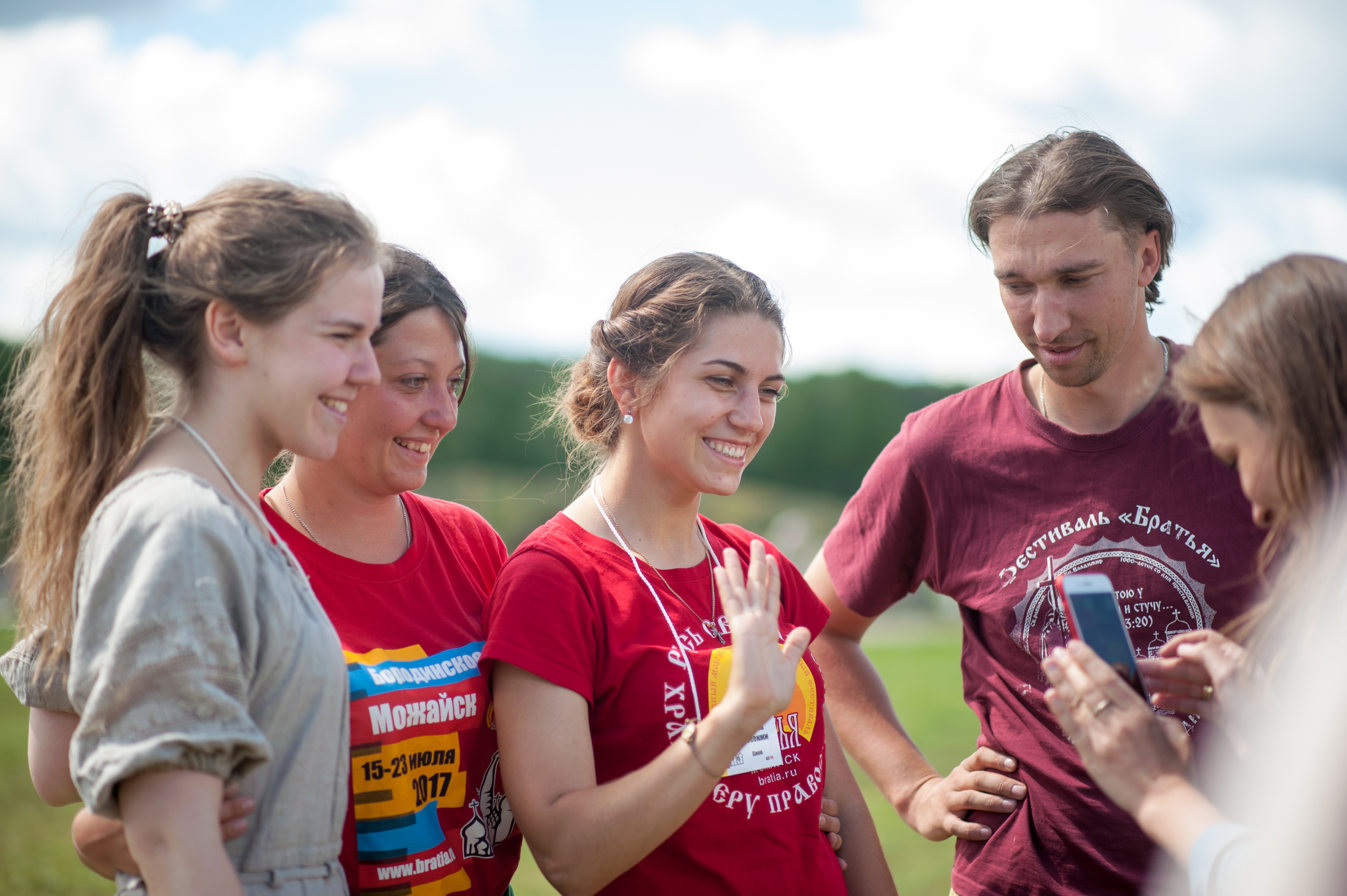

The festival was created for active young people who are ready to live in simple conditions, are interested in Orthodoxy, open to new knowledge, want to relax their souls and make new friends. The overwhelming majority of the festival participants come from Russia, Ukraine, Belarus. They wrote about the summer festival of 2006: "the festival gradually brought up a sense of internationalism in young souls. He was truly international: the whole week in the glade were heard then the Belarusian speech, then the Ukrainian language, then the Smolensk talk, then the Moscow one – in a singing tone and the akanye-ed – talk". Participants also come from other countries: Moldova, Serbia, Poland, Lithuania.

At the first festivals, a very significant part of the participants came from Ukraine, and many of them belonged to the youth community of the Ioninsky monastery in Kyiv, the abbot of which was Archimandrite Jonah (Cherepanov) (from 2011 – the bishop, from 2017 – the archbishop) festival for several years every year came to him at the head of a group of young people from Ukraine, so at the summer festival in 2011 the number of participants from Ukraine reached 200. Over time, the number of participants from Ukraine began to decline, due to the sharp deterioration of Russian-Ukrainian relations in 2014, the high cost, and the fact that many of its youth movements and events appeared in Ukraine, including the Orthodox festival "OrthoFest", organized with the direct participation of Archbishop Jonah (Cherepanov).

Isolated representatives of Western European countries also come, but these are mostly Russian émigrés. According to Oksana Shashuto: "We regularly invite Orthodox people from other European countries. But they don't intend to get here, or individual representatives come".

After the first festival, the number of participants increased with each new festival. In February 2009, Oksana Shashuto noted: "The participants are different, the backbone is the church youth who go to the temples. Many bring their friends .... People come who do not go to church at all, who are simply interested and have a lot of them". At the 2012 summer festival in Crimea, the number of participants reached a maximum of 1,250 people, but this also imposes its own costs: "the number of participants increased every year. But I can not say that it has increased in a qualitative way. More and more people came "for the company", "hang out" fans." For this reason, she called the summer festival of 2012 a very unfortunate one. After that, the number of participants decreased and stabilized by са. 400–600 people on summer festivals and са. 150 people on winter festivals. In the early years, organized groups of 20–30 people came to the festival, then in 2017 Oksana Sashuto noted that "they travel in companies of 3–5 people from a parish or city".

Approximate age limit for participants is 15–35 years. However, this is not a hard limit, but rather a recommendation. According to the priest Yaroslav Yerofeyev: "who comes younger – he is not interested, for example, in events devoted to education: lectures, conversations and so on. Who is over the age of 35 may not be satisfied with the concert program". Since the festival was conceived as a youth, initially the participation of small children was not welcomed (this was allowed as an exception with the special consent of the festival organizing committee), but over time many festival participants got families, including thanks to the acquaintance on the festival, and began to come to the festival with children. According to Oksana Shashuto: "the festival is developing. If earlier we didn't welcome children at the festival at all, then ... in recent years we agree, as it were, if Orthodox families have no one to stay children with, they bring them to the festival".

To participate in the festival, it is necessary to pay a fee for participation in the festival in certain periods, then fill out and send a questionnaire on the festival website and receive confirmation

If the festival holds in Russia non-Russian citizens under the age of 18 years it is necessary to have a notarized statement of the consent from their parents (or guardians) letting them go overseas together with an indication of duration of the trip and a country that they are going to visit Russian Federation. A letter of authority is confirmed on the attendant who has reached the age of 18 years.

=== Volunteers ===
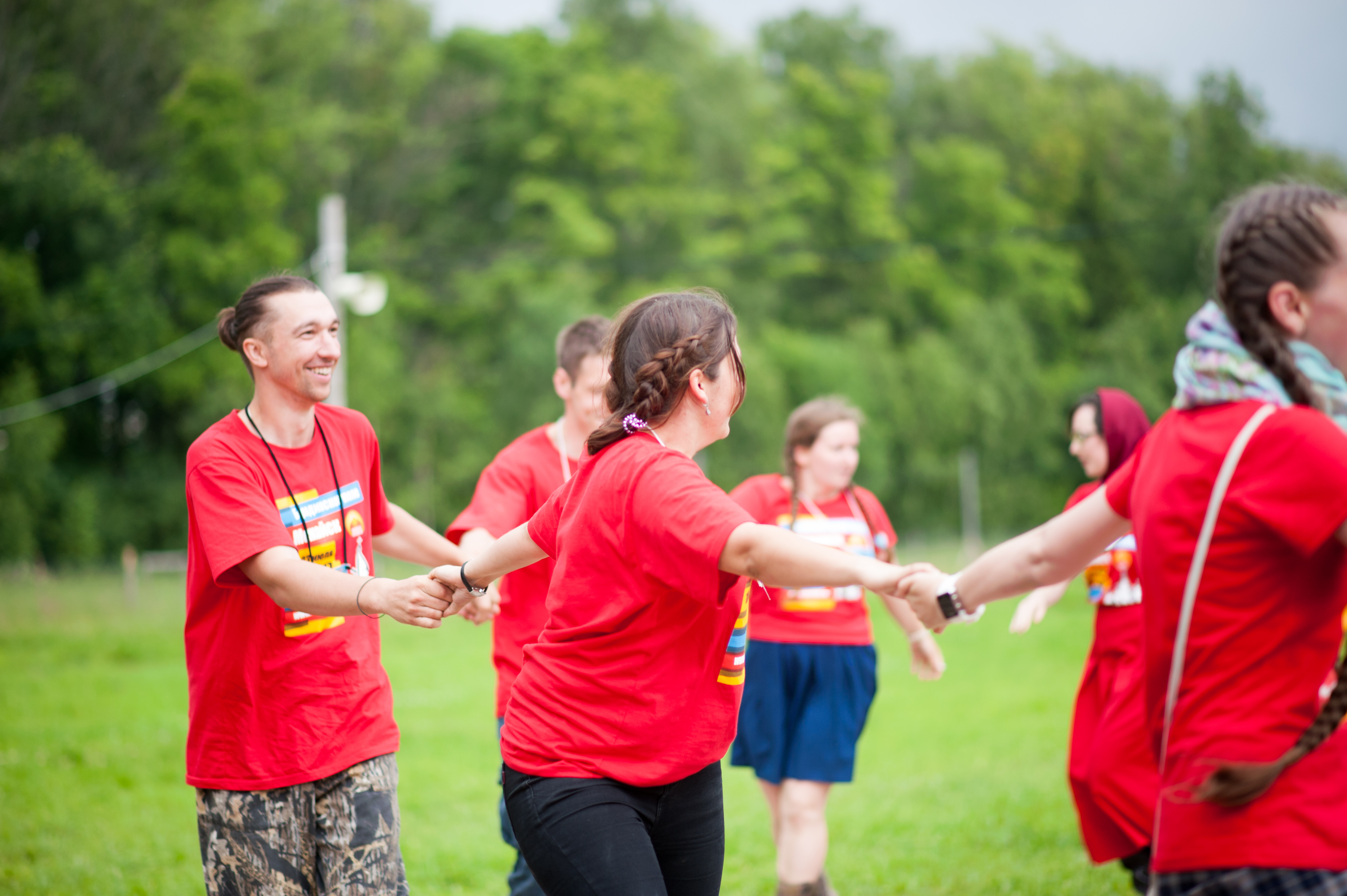
Hand-in-hand volunteers. 2017 Summer festival.

Volunteers are called upon to organize the preparation and holding of the festival and help its participants, especially newcomers. Volunteers are given specially prepared for them red shirts with the emblem of the festival. Volunteers set up their tents separately from other participants. The number of volunteers attracted by the organizers varies depending on how many people enrolled in the festival.

Initially, the volunteers, as well as the organizers of the festival, were from Mozhaisk and were part of the youth group at St. Nicholas Cathedral in Mozhaisk. However, beginning with the second festival, volunteers began to recruit from among experienced and responsible participants from different cities who attended the festival.

At the initiative of the director of the festival "Bratya" Oksana Shashuto and the spiritual father of the festival priest Yaroslav Yerofeyev, a "School of Volunteers" was organized. As Victoria Anikeeva noted: "It's good when the guys are called to be volunteers, but if there is no proper preparation and there is no single scheme and system, then everything can fall apart. And therefore it became clear that the team should be prepared seriously". For the first time, the "School of Volunteers" was held from July 9 to July 14, 2017 at the Borodino field, just before the festival held there. The second "School of Volunteers" was held July 28 to August 3, 2018, also directly in front of the festival. Upon completion of training, participants receive certificates from the Synodal Department of Youth Affairs of the Russian Orthodox Church for attending a volunteer school. The goal of the school of volunteers is not only to give its students knowledge, but also to rally them into a single team, "immerse them in the atmosphere of the festival, help everyone tune in to the upcoming hard selfless work, learn to survive in difficult conditions".

The volunteer of the festival "Bratya" should:

- know the history and philosophy of the festival, be able to competently and interestingly talk about it;
- not to be timid before difficulties, to have perseverance and a desire to be useful;
- be benevolent: "Even if you make a reprimand, do it with love";
- be able to make a team from a group of people who are assigned to him; be able to rally participants of the festival within their group with the help of familiarity games, rallying games and other common events; be able to immerse them in the atmosphere of the festival; be able to cheer them up;
- be able to functionally support the work of the festival: build a camp (kitchen, toilets, showers, washstands), make a fire (this is allowed only for volunteers), raise and pack a camp, be on duty at the distribution of food and stuff;
- be able to organize various events within the framework of the festival: be able to speak in front of a large group of people, including holding concerts, be able to schedule events, follow the schedule to prevent chaos at the festival, and timely inform the participants of the festival about certain events;
- maintain a balance between working with the group and administrative tasks;
- maintain a balance between work and rest in order to avoid both overwork and insufficient workload;

At the same time, not only volunteers, but also any participant of the festival can work "for the good of the common cause", performing this or that work by agreement with the organizers or volunteers.

=== Participation of clergy in the festival ===
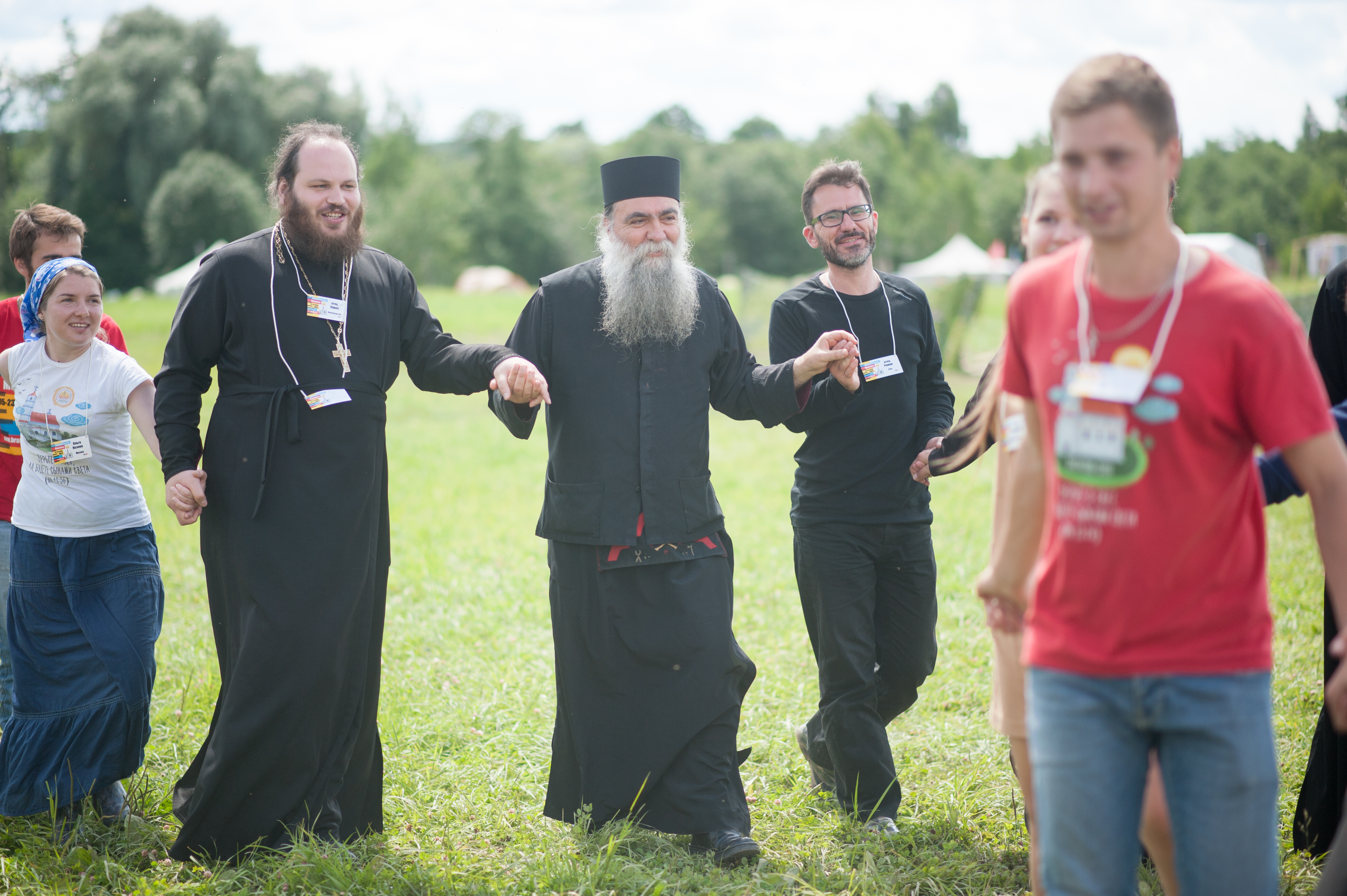
Round dance with the participation of the clergy. 2017 Summer Festival

The constant attribute of each festival is the participation of Orthodox clergy in it. According to Yana Sedova, "the feeling of unity is enhanced by the fact that the priests share with us the joys and difficulties of living in a modest tent camp". The priests are thus freed from solving organizational issues to give them time to conduct "general", "mini-conversations" and for informal communication with the participants of the festival. Such communication is one of the tasks of the organizers.

In 2011, the Bishop Jonah (Cherepanov) noted: "Many young people who came to the festival practically have no opportunity to talk with priests at home. ... People who have been going to church for many years, have been participating in the Sacraments for many years, cannot sit down and talk heart to heart with a priest? ... Many provincial priests physically have no opportunity to pay attention to the young man, because they have a lot of demands, a lot of worshipers, a lot of duties on the temple. ... For many of them, it was a revelation, so that easily, sitting next to the priest, to hear some things, to be able to ask questions".

According to the priest Yaroslav Yerofeyev: "unfortunately, not very many fathers come, but those who are bright, not indifferent and ready to communicate with young people 24 hours a day come". In addition, the organizers are accustomed to the proposals of the participants of the festival: "Constantly there are those who give new ideas! For us, this impulse, what popular personalities to look for. There are priests ... who have been actively working with young people for a long time, they come to us with pleasure. But some offer and little-known lecturers, priests. We listen to them on the Internet and invite. The guys like it and we are happy."

According to a long-term participant of the festival, Archpriest Nikolai Mogilny: "I really like the Christian love and friendship that arise between the priests who come to the festival. We become family people and every time you miss and wait for a meeting". There is a tradition at the festival as a token of approval to the priests to chant: "Отцы-молодцы!".

=== Accommodation in a tent camp at the summer festival ===
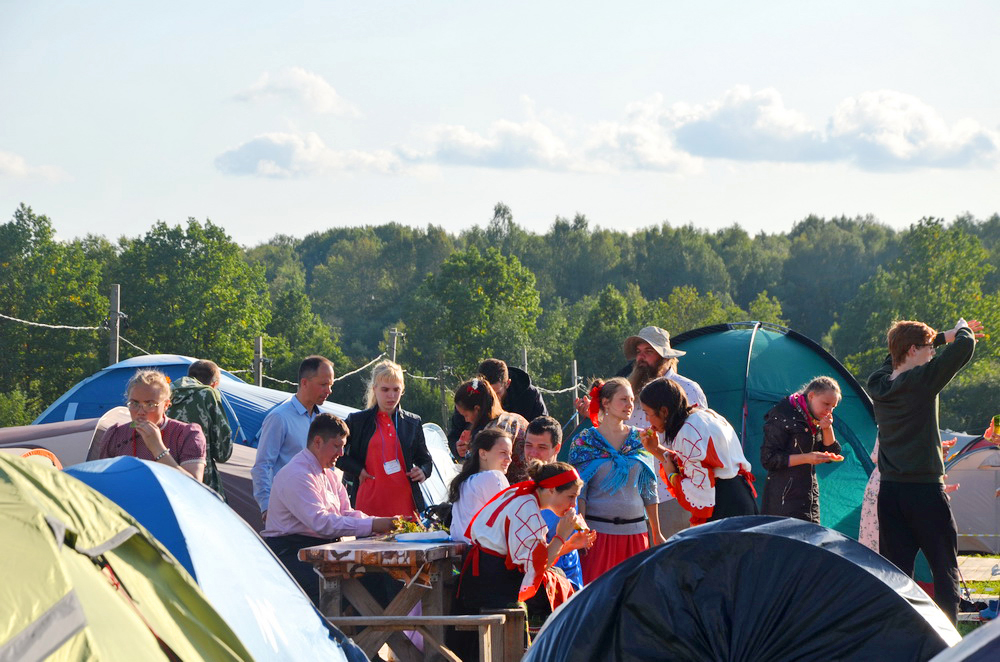
Supper. 2019 Summer Festival

Participants of the summer festival live in tents, for which an open-air tent camp is organized. At the first festivals people who came together from one town or region, settled together. For convenience, organizers began to divide the tent city into sectors, and each sector received a name for the place from which its participants came. Each sector is assigned a certain number of volunteers; throughout the festival they provide assistance to the participants living in their sector, voice them the plan for the next day and upcoming events, and are also responsible for maintaining order in their sector.

Since the festival in 2014, the resettlement on the field did not take place by cities and communities, but in a mix at the discretion of the organizers. This was done to make friends or at least "to acquaint everyone and everything as much as possible". Sectors, starting from this festival, received names according to a certain concept conceived by the organizers of the festival; the choice of subject of names depends on the location of the festival and the general theme of a particular festival.

Tents in which the participants live, they bring with them. In addition to the participants' tents, there should be a sleeping bag, sleeping pad and personal care. For a fee at the festival you can rent a tent, but in this case it is necessary to coordinate the issue with the organizers in advance, as the number of such tents is limited. Sleeping bags and pads are not available for rent. With the exception of couples is not allowed to stay guys and girls in the same tent.

According to the long-term participant of the festival, Archpriest Nikolai Mogilny, living in a tent camp includes an element of austerity: "Often you need to be humbled, especially if there are two or three people in a tent: someone is sitting, wants to talk, and you want to sleep. In any case, this is an inner work on yourself. It is a struggle with your own egoism. It is clear that all this naturally moves a person to that feat, when love for one's neighbor wins in him.

A field canteen is organized at the summer festival, where food is delivered from the nearest town. To protect it from rain, it is placed under an awning. In addition to the kitchen itself, awnings with benches and tables are placed. Three meals a day, included in the cost of participation at the festival. The menu is simple and undemanding, but satisfying. Drinking alcohol is strictly forbidden at the festival; violators are subject to immediate eviction. Smoking at the festival is allowed only in specially designated areas. For smokers, these participants became an incentive to quit smoking.

At each summer festival, a stage and places for spectators are necessarily mounted, a camp church is built, a registration tent, washbasins, toilet and shower stalls are set up, playgrounds for sports competitions and games are arranged, litter bins. The campground is guarded.

It is forbidden to arbitrarily leave the territory of the festival camp without the consent of the organizing committee. This is due both to the fact that the organizers are responsible for the safety of the participants, and to the fact that, according to Oksana Shashuto, "if you leave for a day, for half a day, you drop out of it, this is not very advisable".

Organizers urge to carefully consider the choice of clothing for the festival. In case of rain, it is recommended to take a raincoat, rubber boots and warm clothes may be required. It can be hot during the day at the festival field, and cold at night.

=== Hotel accommodation at the winter festival ===
The participants of the winter festival live in the hotel complex, the cost of accommodation and meals is included in the fee. In the case of the 2015 Winter Festival in the Holy Land 2015 and the 2018 Winter Festival in Cyprus, the price included the price of air tickets, medical insurance and transfer to the hotel. And although the organizers are trying to choose budget hotels, the price of the winter festival is noticeably higher than the summer one. This makes winter festivals less financially affordable and less crowded. About 150 people usually come to them (see the section Festivals held). According to Oksana Shashuto: "It's quite a closed winter festival of this kind, where you can get to know each and every one by the name of almost a week".

In winter, a temporary church is not built, but existing ones are used. The presence of such a temple nearby is one of the important criteria when choosing a hotel. The scene is also not built, but the assembly hall of the hotel is used, or it is rented separately.

Unlike the summer festival, at which, with the exception of the procession and the excursion day, all the participants' activities are focused on the festival field, at the winter festival the organizers do not seek to close themselves exclusively in the hotel complex and often arrange trips or hikes. Excursion and pilgrimage days are appointed, when participants go out by bus in the morning for a trip, during which they visit several places, and return from it by the evening.

While the program of summer festivals does not change significantly from year to year, winter festivals may differ significantly from each other.

=== Festival spirit and mood ===
According to its participants, the atmosphere at the festival is very warm and friendly. Priest Yaroslav Yerofeyev celebrated that "grace" at the festival, which, despite all the difficulties, again and again prompted him to take on new festivals: "Grace, this is what happens at the festival, to which I want to return again and again. It's like a prayer. Why do we return to prayer, because we are well, we communicate with the Heavenly Father. The festival is also the joy of meeting, the joy of socializing". According to Bishop Jonah (Cherepanov): "The festival pleases with its informality and lack of protocol. Not indifferent people, by working, give the opportunity to enjoy other indifferent people".

As noted on the pravoslavie.ru website: "The Festival "Bratya" is, first of all, a spiritual community, sincere help to one's neighbor, a creative approach to the realization of life tasks, a wide range of opportunities for the effective self-realization of young people, the development of their creative and spiritual potential, and – a unique opportunity to meet talented, interesting people and tell yourself about yourself, your achievements and hopes".

As Yana Sedova noted: "mutual aid is a necessary condition for life on the "Bratya". The overwhelming majority of participants are urban dwellers, not everyone has a tourist experience. Finally, you will not take everything you need from home; you will forget something anyway. Therefore, participants try to come to each other for help. You spilled compote? Take the second one! You can not catch up with the procession? Lean on my arm! You come to the festival without a headscarf? I have an extra one! Dozens of such trifles have remained in my memory, which together constitute a unique friendly atmosphere". According to Oksana Shashuto: "The state of helping one another, when someone is cold, someone drowns, someone swam away, someone needs to be saved, it gives a lot. If now there was just prosperity, they would not have been worried about each other and, perhaps, would not have been introduced to each other in such numbers".

As noted by the participants of the Penza-based Orthodox youth association "Voskreseniye" in 2014, despite the rich program "the festival was truly Orthodox. And now it is not only about the daily Liturgies, the morning and evening prayer rules, which can be unusual for unchurched people; not even about pilgrimages to such famous places as Optina Pustyn or Sergiev Posad. It was a difficult verbal culture of behavior. Having got there from the ordinary world, as if you find yourself in ... the place where the germs of the Orthodox faith in each of us are protected, healed and fed ... And this is also an inspiration from the realization that you have many like-minded people, brothers and sisters in Christ. And the belief that with our work and God's help, we can make this world kinder and brighter".

As Olga Lazar noted, the organizers strive that young people, after leaving the festival, to share their knowledge, to introduce "that bright feeling that was created at the festival into their daily life".

== Program ==
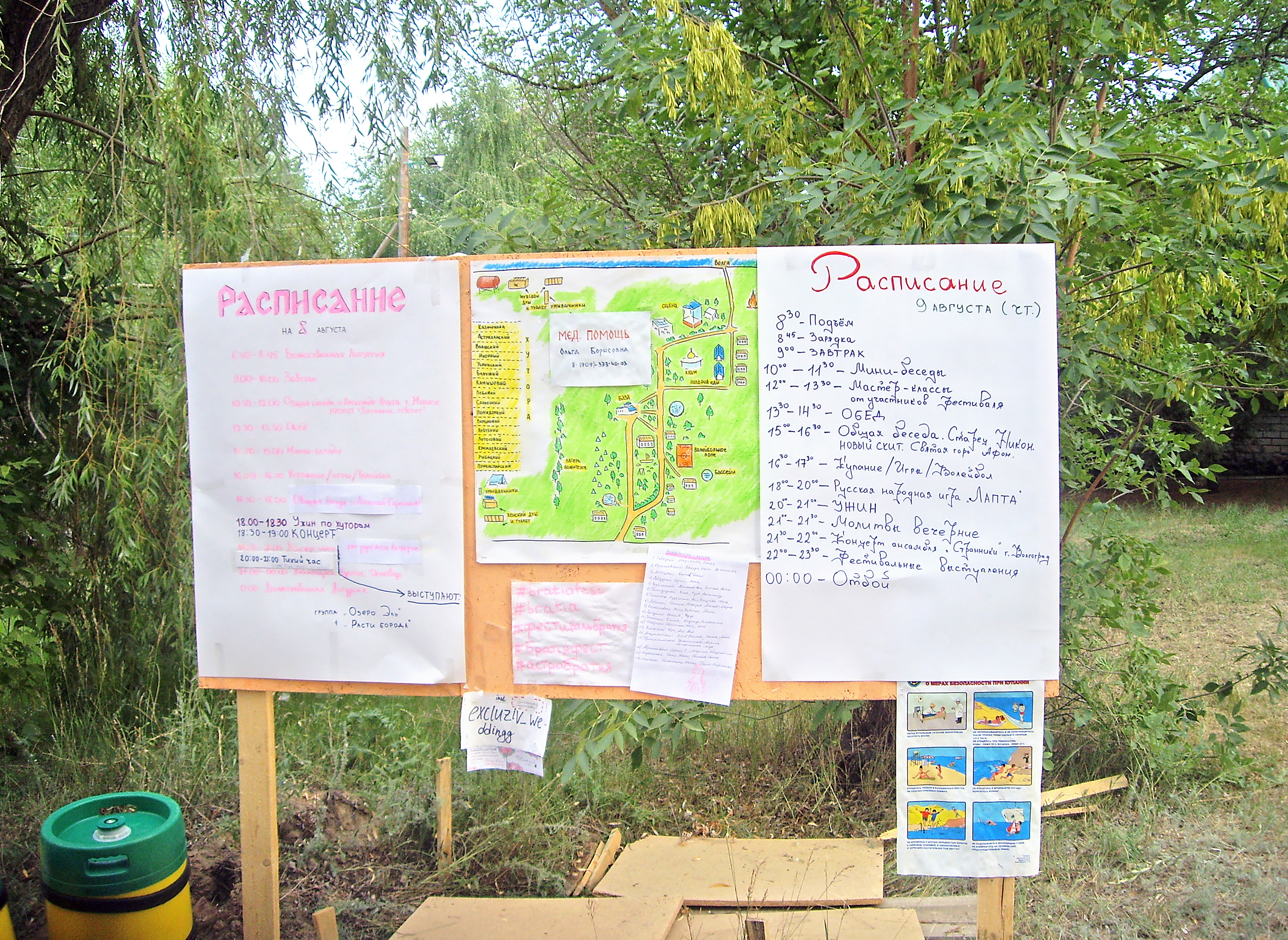
Schedule of events for the current and next day. Summer festival 2018.

Already the program of the very first festival was written in such a way that each festival day was strictly scheduled and eventful. This continued in the future. Maria Evsina described the standard program of the festival day of the summer festival in such a way: "Every day "Bratya" was full and was filled with various kinds of events. In the morning, the participants woke up to the Divine Liturgy, then they cheered on their exercises, had breakfast and dispersed in mini-conversations or general lectures on spiritual topics, during which everyone could safely ask his questions. ... In the evenings, concerts were held at which everyone who wished to attend the festival showed their talents ... Sometimes, after concerts, anyone could sing songs around a campfire with a guitar or get a sector to talk to a candle".

Although participants are given the freedom to choose to attend most events, the festival implies an understanding of its objectives and active involvement by the participants, rather than an idle pastime. According to the priest Yaroslav Yerofeyev: "Everything happens very dynamically, the guys are loaded with classes. We try to find approaches that would be interesting spiritually and physically. To miss and be sad there is not necessary. Many complain that there is no free time to just talk".

=== Check in and open ===
Volunteers come first to the festival to prepare the surrounding area for the festival and set up temporary buildings and tents necessary for it.

Starting in 2010, the arrival of the majority of participants at the summer festival begins on Saturday from noon. On this day, they are usually met at the station, train or bus station by volunteers who help them get to the festival field. For this most often hired buses. Participants who arrive before or after the date of official arrival will travel independently. For those who will come by themselves a location map is attached on festival website

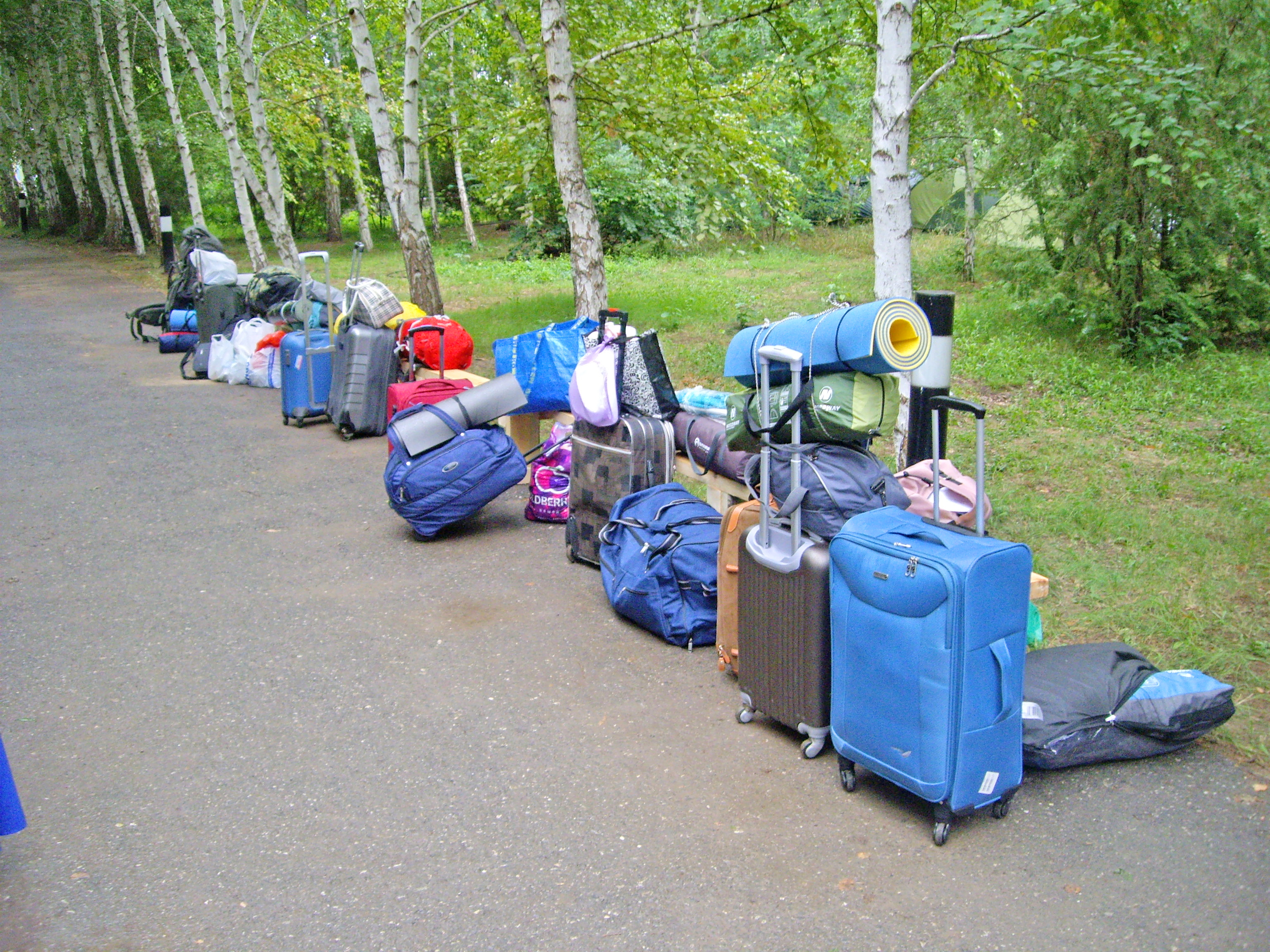
Baggage of those who have already arrived, but have not yet settled. Summer festival 2018.

Arriving at the festival, participants come to the registration tent, where they receive badges of the festival participant with the name and city where the person came from. After that, in agreement with the volunteers, they set up their tents in the field reserved for them. On the same day, after the arrival of the main part of the sector, volunteers lead the game to meet the participants of the sector.

At about 8:00 pm – 9:00 pm on the same day, the first concert performance begins. It is the "presentation of cities" (Russian: Представление городов), where participants from one place get together and perform a stage presentation of their city, town or region in an arbitrary creative form, usually in the form of kapustnik. The duration of one speech should not exceed 5 minutes. The submission of cities first appeared at the 2007 summer festival instead of the grand opening of the festival, which was postponed to the evening following the arrival of the day. Due to the smaller number of participants and festival days, the winter festival usually dispenses with the representation of cities.

The next morning after the arrival is a prayer service for receiving a petition and for all the blessings of God, and in the evening of the same day, at about 8:00 pm, the grand opening of the festival begins, to which representatives of local authorities are traditionally invited. The first song that sounds at this concert is the festival anthem in the form of a song, the peculiarity of which is that in one way or another the word "brothers" is played up in it. The hymn is composed only for the summer festival, so the number of hymns coincides with the age of the festival.

=== Worship and common prayers ===
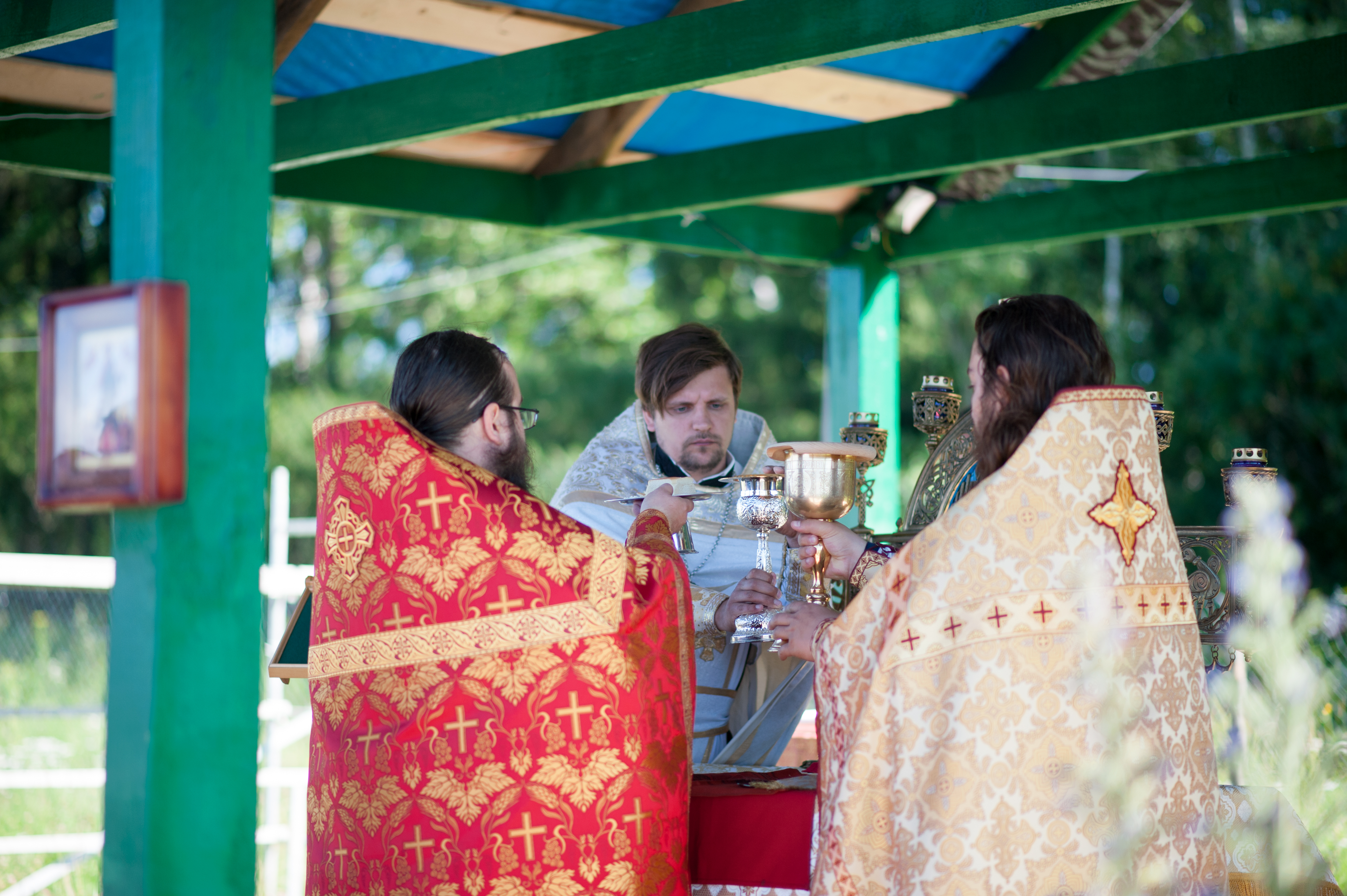
Divine Liturgy in the camp church. 2017 Summer festival.

During the preparation of the first festival, it was decided that each day would begin and end with a prayer. Daily at the festival morning and evening prayers are read according to the prayer book. According to Victoria Anikeeva, "no one forces participants to read it, a microphone is put to which those guys who are ready to read out loud approach, and everyone else is praying side by side".

The Divine Liturgy is celebrated almost every morning in the camp church, which is being built at the festival field. The church itself is small and can hold an altar, and the laity pray before it. A temporary temple is intentionally done without walls, so the worshipers see everything that the priests do. According to Yana Sedova, the festival liturgy "is always with a missionary touch. The absence of an iconostasis allows you to see everything that happens in altar, and aloud reading of secret prayers by many priests immerses stronger to the essence of the Sacrament". Singers for the choir are recruited from young people who came to the festival and have experience singing in the choir. Liturgy is not served as a rule on the day of arrival, on the day of pilgrim trips and the morning after the night liturgy.

Once, near the end of the festival, night worship is celebrated, which begins at 21.00 with the reading of the canons and rules for the Communion, and since the festival is used to confess before communion, the clergy at this time accept the confession from those tho not have time to confess earlier. At 23.00 the Vespers begin, and after Orthros was celebrated, during which practically all the participants of the festival take communion. According to Oksana Shashauto: "We followed in the footsteps of the first Christians, when services were held in the evening and at evening and night to hide from the persecutors. Now, in most temples, night liturgies are performed traditionally on Easter and Christmas. And then we prayed right under the open sky, under the stars. It was an amazing feeling." Many participants call night worship the culmination of the festival. As Maria Evsina noted: "The night service in "Bratya" is a little Easter. I felt the transmitted joy and grace, seeing around me friendly participants with candles in their hands, united by this holiday. The service was literally in one breath, in concentrated silence and solemn singing. And finally, the Communion. And after him – joyful fraternal embrace and congratulations. Christ is Risen! Truly Risen!".

=== Campfire ===
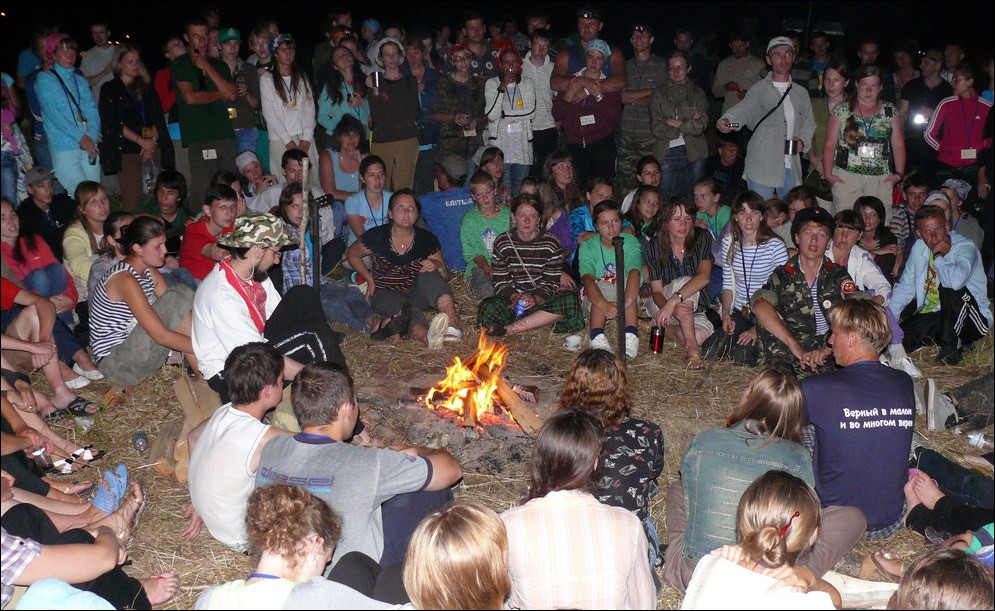
Evening campfire. 2010 summer festival

Every evening at the summer festival a campfire is lit, where any participant of the festival can come. Evenings around the campfire were conceived in preparation for the first festival; thus, the portal "Slovo" noted in a note about the preparation of the first festival: "Life in tents, songs, conversations around the evening fire, are intended not only to fill the festival meetings with romance, but also to rally Orthodox youth".

At the "Campfire" it is customary to sing songs, usually with an acoustic guitar, as well as talk. In addition, it may become cold in the evening, and then the fire is used as a means of heating. As Olga Lazar wrote in 2014, "in the evenings, everyone gathers a huge and friendly campfire. We sing songs together, play together, it's hard only to go to sleep. Volunteers, as they can, try to disperse everyone, because the next day there are a lot of activities, it is better to be vigorous for them".

In addition to informal gatherings around the campfire outside the main program, the program of the very first festival included such an event as "Campfire and Songs". The purpose of such an event is to familiarize participants with each other. If on the day of arrival the participants get acquainted by sectors, then on the second day of the festival, after the official opening ceremony, the program includes a "Campfire" where participants from different sectors can meet.

After the closing ceremony of the festival according to the schedule should be "farewell campfire", where you can sit until the morning.

=== "General conversations" and "mini-conversations" ===
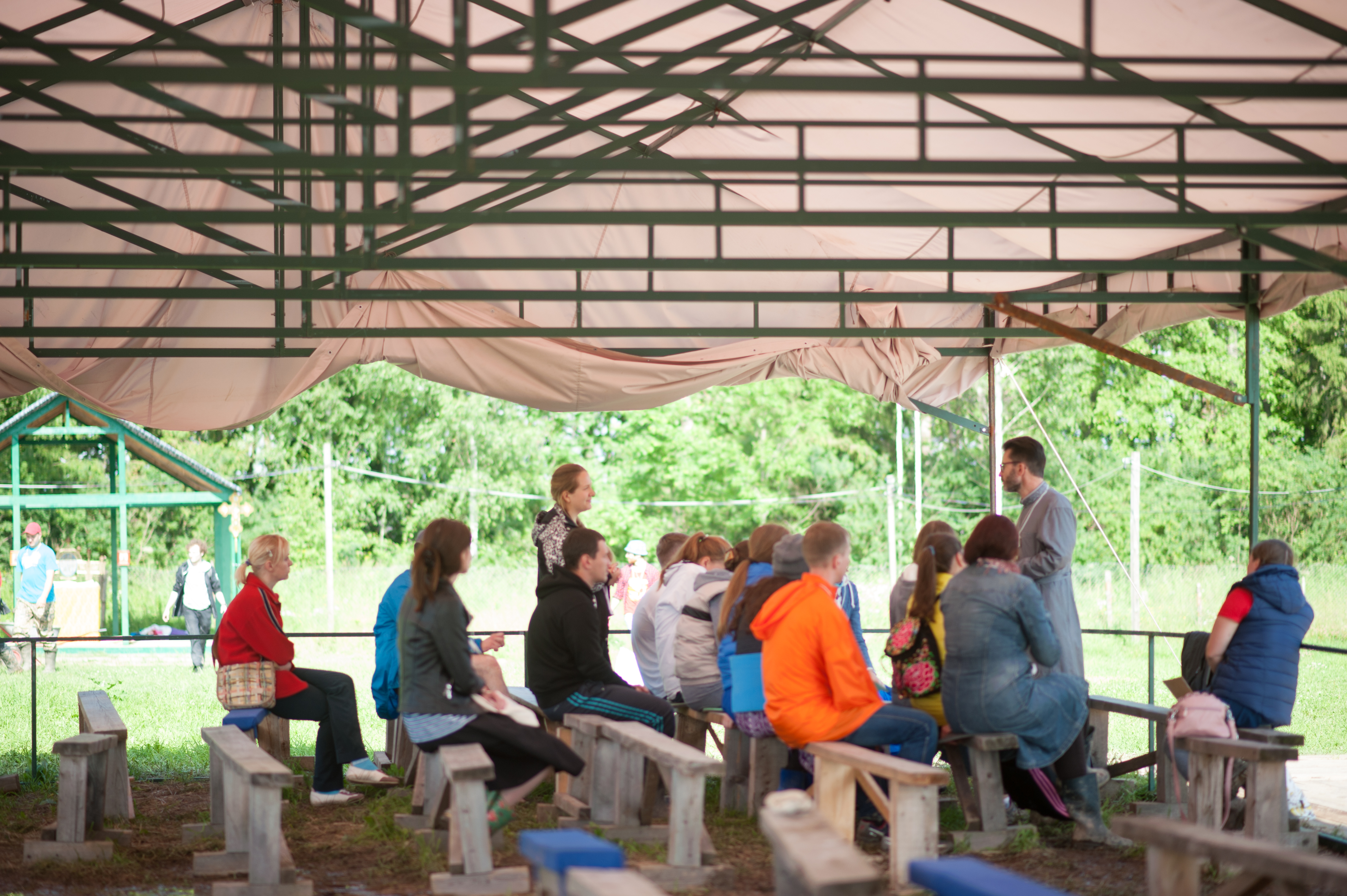
Priest Roman Andrienko conducts a mini-conversation. 2017 summer festival.

The lectures are built in the format of "general conversation" (Russian: общая беседа) and "mini-conversation" (Russian: мини-беседа), and not only listening to the lecture, but also asking the listeners questions. As noted in the Moscow Diocesan Gazette, "the fathers help find answers to many questions, and sometimes, on the contrary, think and ask themselves a question: do I live, do I do the right thing?". Conversations can be conducted not only by priests and bishops, but also by well-versed laypeople. These activities are held in the morning and in the daytime.

A general conversation is usually held once a day, and all participants of the festival are invited to it. The name of the speaker is announced in advance in the festival program. Mini-conversations begin with the fact that all the participants of the festival approach the festival scene, where volunteers go up with signs in their hands. On the plates are written the names of mini conversations, of which each participant chooses the closest topic to him. When choosing a topic, participants not know exactly who will lead the mini-conversation. After the festival participants choose a topic, volunteers take them to the place where the selected "mini-conversation" will take place. Mini-conversations are held simultaneously, so at one moment you can attend only one mini-conversation. The number of mini-talks is different each time and depends on the number of participants in the festival and on the number of priests who are ready to lead them. According to Oksana Shashuto: "Everyone diverges in such small groups. And, it turns out, there is an opportunity to talk face to face, ... people 20, 10 – a conversation with a particular priest on a specific topic. Well, these conversations, even though they are mini, they should end in one hour, they more and more often begin to reach out and not end, because no one can disperse". As Yulia Voskoboinikova noted, "the free format of such conversations practically "ate" the distance between the shepherds and the flock, which helped both those and others to better see and understand each other. Indeed, it is difficult to maintain a rigid chain of command, sitting side by side on the grass". Topics of conversations can be very different, including those not directly connected with the Church. Traditionally popular are topics related to family life and the search for a life partner. The only restriction imposed on such conversations is not to talk about politics "in any manifestations".

=== Festival performances and creativity ===
Every day musical and theatrical performances take place on the improvised stage of the festival; as a rule, they are held in the evening after the lectures, which are held in the morning and afternoon. This has been the case since the first festival.

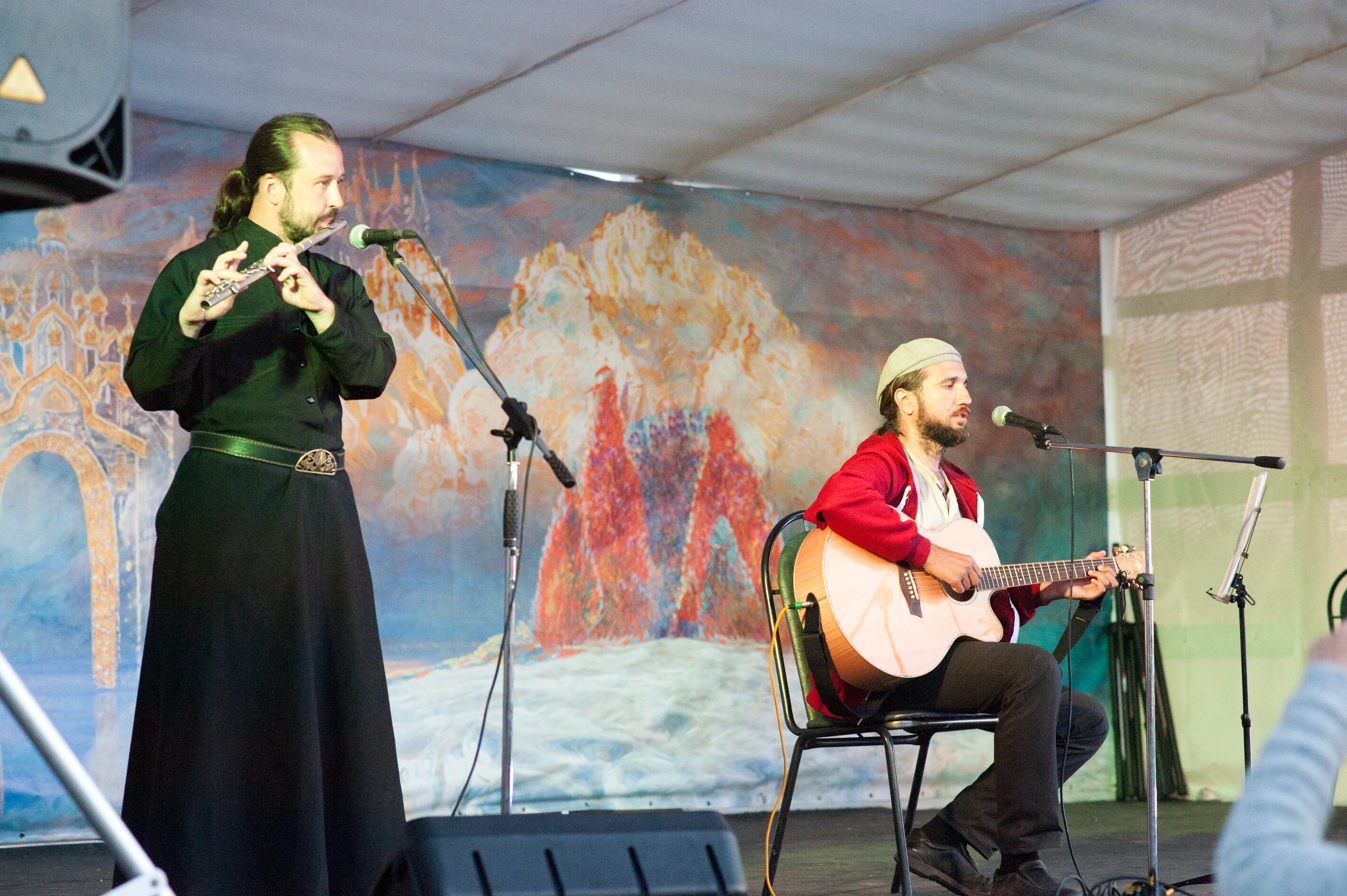
Priest Viktor Nikishov (flute) and priest Yaroslav Yerofeyev (guitar, vocals). 2017 Summer festival.

On the festival stage, singing with a guitar or sometimes a cappella, purely instrumental performances, dances, and artistic reading can occur. The music from the scene is not limited to any one genre. It can be folk songs and church singing and author song and rock and pop music and even rap. The general direction is not a genre, but rather the life-affirming direction of these performances; Concerts at the festival, according to Oksana Shashuto, are "warm, kind, friendly". Soulful acts coexist with humorous ones. The organizers do not seek to invite famous artists. The peculiarity of the festival is that any participant can perform on stage a musical or some other act after passing the audition, that provides by volunteers. Priests, who come to the festival, also may sing on the festival scene.

According to Oksana Shashuto, the stage performances do not provide for contests, "there is no competition, there is no such thing that people come and tremble, what place they will take and are ready to win everybody. ... We therefore tried to do everything very informally and very unformattedly". At each festival, the priest Yaroslav Yerofeyev performs a guitar with an acoustic guitar with his own songs. The dance performances of Oksana Shashuto's dance studio are traditional, including the girl act "Mozhaisk Hares" (Russian: зайцы-можайцы), in which they put white cardboard ears on their heads and move with a rapidly reproduced phonogram, which gives the performance is an additional comic effect. There is a tradition to arrange spontaneous horovods or run in chains around the stage during the performance of songs: "standing among the spectators during a concert, you suddenly, caught up by someone's hand, swept away in a swirling rush, becoming part of a huge round dance".

In addition, there is a tradition at the festival to sing songs not only during performances on the stage and rehearsals, but also in any free time. As Maria Evsina wrote about the 2017 winter festival: "We sang everywhere and always! On the train back and forth in the brotherly carriage they constantly gathered with the guitar. Nightly meetings were good the same. You come all exhausted at 12 at night in the room after a busy day, and your name is to tea, sing songs with a guitar. I forgot about the dream for a week! Any concert, whether it was the opening, closing or performance of Father Yaroslav and the Orthodox ensemble "Kazachenka" from Astrakhan, was accompanied by singing. On any road (both on foot and on buses), someone started and the rest picked up".

=== "Angels" ===
In the first days of the festival, its participants pull out a piece of paper with the name of their "ward", about which, without opening his name, he must take care, pray, give presents, that is, be his "angel". But before this "ward" you need to find among the participants of the festival. In the community of the festival on the social network Vkontakte it was noted: "Gifts should not be expensive and not necessarily they should be gifts – sometimes attention and a smile are more pleasant and necessary".

For example, in 2011, the "angels" play looked like this: "while the festival was going, your task was to create good for your ward. And in this, everyone was who was ready for something – someone passed through others to his ward gifts bought in advance, icons, bouquets, freshly picked from wildflowers, lemonade, which was so useful on a hot summer day and sweets bought along the way from the procession. But it was possible in the morning to find the birch donated by the Angel to his ward, as the fresh inscription on it and even the fish in the river, loudly called an aquarium, with a written request not to catch these fish, were announced, as they were donated to such a ward by Angel. Well, such amenities as, for example, a song as a gift – the singers sent from Angel surrounded the ward and gave him a song".

At the end of the festival, the "Angels" are revealed at the command of the organizers, and at the same time they become acquainted with both the "angel" and the ward. Started dating often turns into friendship.

=== Pilgrimages, excursions and processions ===
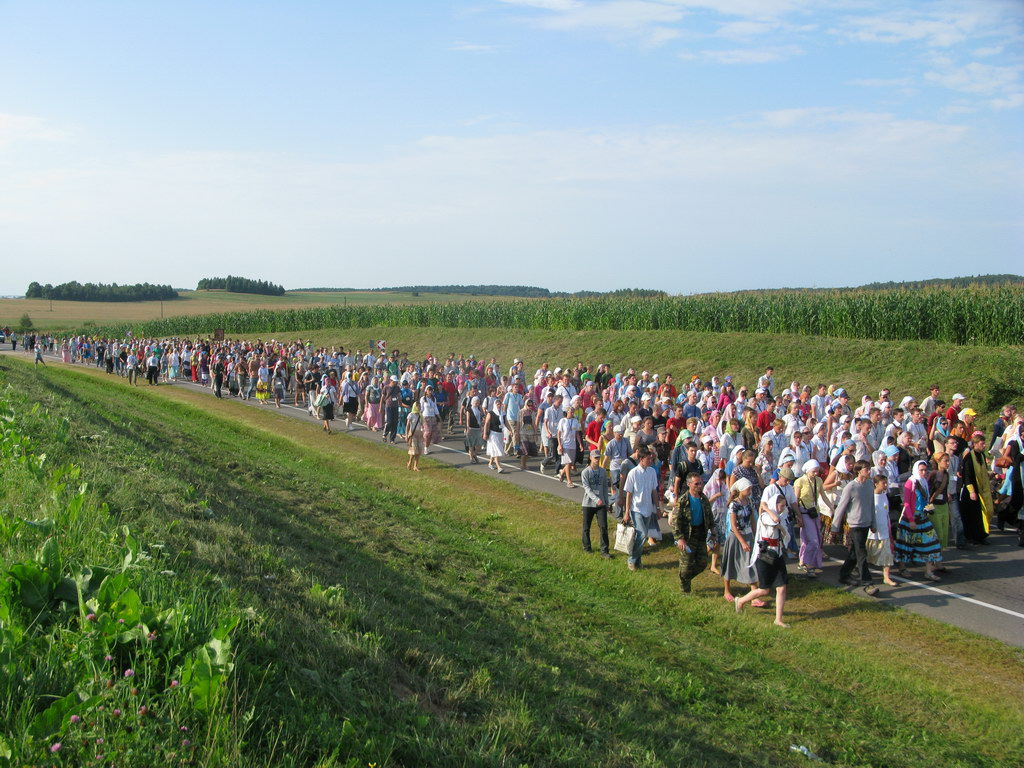
The procession to Lahoysk. 2010 Summer festival

Not a single festival "Bratya" is complete without a visit to Eastern Orthodox shrines located near its venues. On one of the days at the summer festival, a festival-wide procession takes place to a particular church or monastery, where after that all those who come participate in the service, and then return. As Taisia Sakovich wrote in 2009: "Imagine yourself: a column of 700 people is walking, occupying the entire right lane, and giving a prayer chants in a friendly choir! Cars were passing by. The surprised faces of the people accompanied us. It turns out that the church is not only silent standing with bowed head and not only grandmothers! It is also a living youth".

In addition, the summer festival program necessarily highlights the excursion day, when festival participants take buses and drive around on predetermined routes, and return to the festival venue in the evening. Everyone chooses their route in advance, when registering for the festival. According to Oksana Shashuto: "when we come to another city, we try to set aside a separate day for pilgrimage excursions to see those shrines, those cities, those beauties that are located there, which we generally have never seen and hardly would have seen if they hadn't come there. Therefore, ... 6–7 variants of excursions are usually thought out by local guys. And in one day, all buses depart for different points of the region, the diocese". In this case, tours are not necessarily organized to churches or monasteries. It can be museums or natural or architectural monuments. As the participants get up early on the excursion, the morning rule is already read on the bus.

=== Sports and other competitions ===
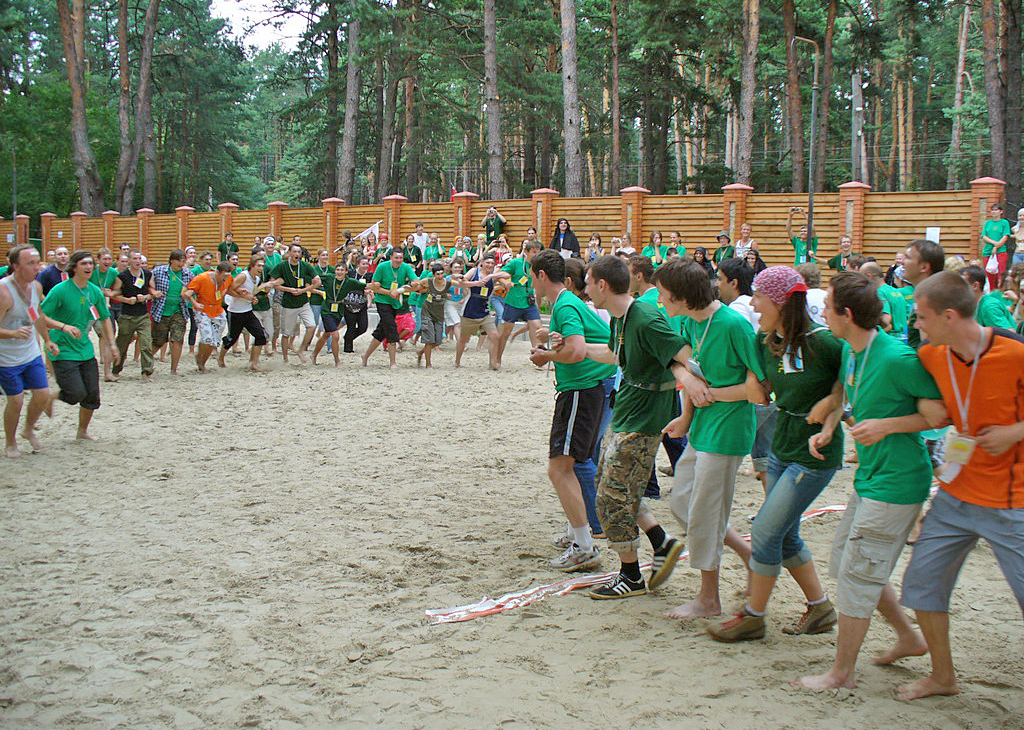
Sport competition. 2008 summer festival.

Already at the first festival sports competitions in football and volleyball were provided; In the future, it was these games that were most often played at summer festivals. This gives festival participants the opportunity to show their strength, dexterity and skills. Unlike musical performances, in sports competitions there is competition and competition for first place. However, there is no reward for winning or it is symbolic.

Since the first festival football and volleyball games are held at summer festivals. In winter, the festival can be skis, snowballs, skates, etc. Since 2006, the role-playing game in the form of a quest. To win, participants need to show not only quick thinking, but also quickness and agility. Since the summer festival of 2014, a vigorous morning exercise is held, allowing participants to cheer up after they woke up.

At the summer festival of 2013, it was said: "Sport is life, a healthy mind in a healthy body, in a person who has the strength and desire to win, the soul always lives, capable of winning, including winning their fears and doubts, being able to endlessly diligently approach God. Sport is a school of life, where one fact is evident: "right away" and "quickly" nothing happens, including the development of spiritual balance".

At the festival of 2006, a mini-football championship was held between the national teams of Ukraine, Russia, Belarus and the priests who came to the festival: "Everything here was like real football: fans actively waving national flags, chanting recitatives of their national teams". At the summer festival of 2007, a comic festival Olympiad in support of the Sochi 2014 Olympics was held, which was held as follows: "All were divided into teams for the same badges on the badges ... We had to pass 15 tests – all were made by analogy with the real Olympic competitions – and winter. ... it was an exciting action – the teams made up names for themselves, chants. All sought to do conscientiously !! "A lot was important for participation, but for some it was VICTORY – they achieved it".

Representatives of the Foundation "Warriors of the Fatherland", who visited the summer festival of 2015, noted the interest of its participants in tactical training and stated the inconsistency of the ideas about "the predisposition of Orthodox youth exclusively to a contemplative lifestyle, some detachment from it or a passive life position".

In addition, at the festival there are competitions for erudition. Board games were held. From 2014 in the mornings, after the prayer, charging began.

=== Master Classes ===
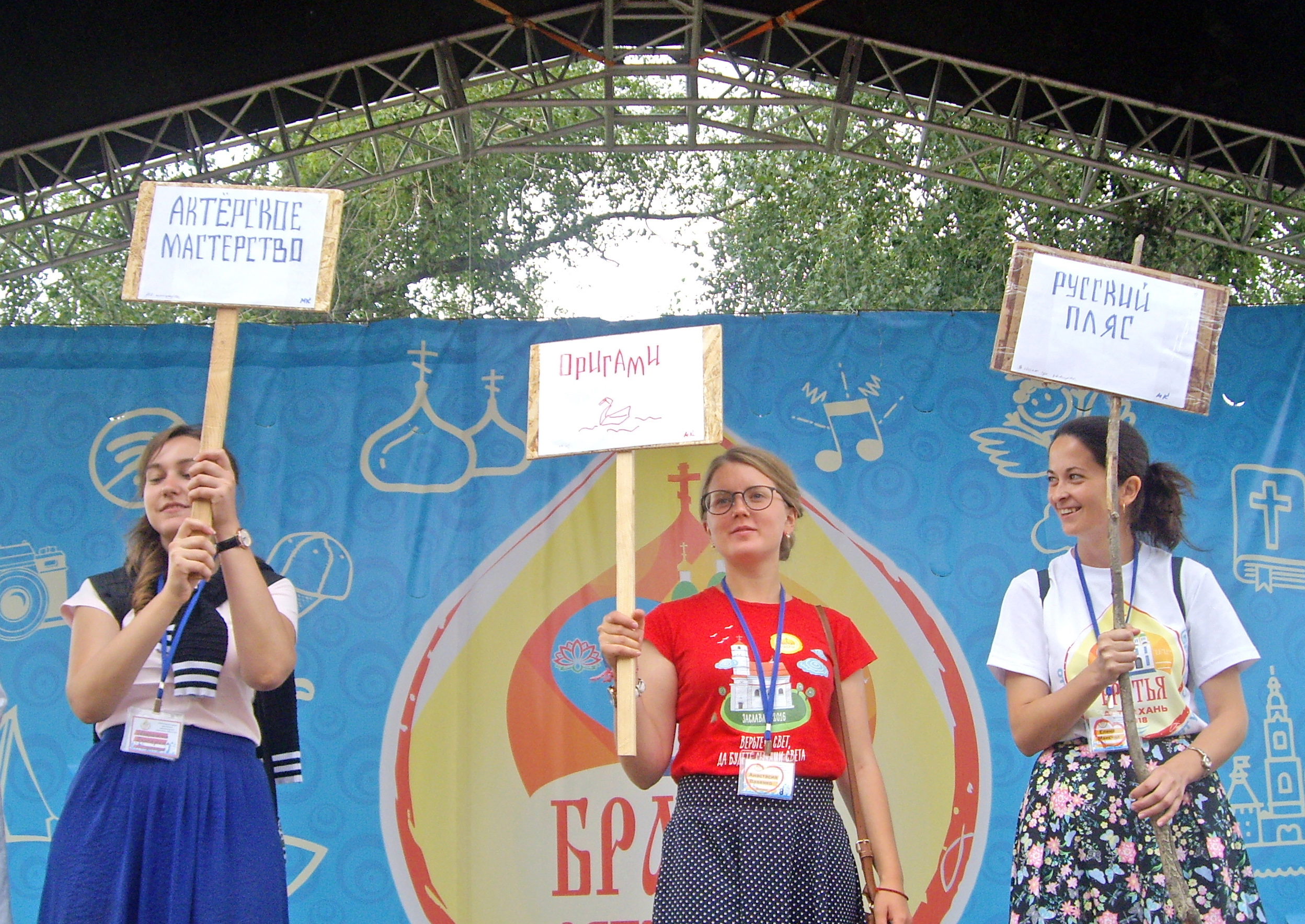
Signs with the names of the master classes. 2018 summer festival.

The master classes in the festival program were first held at the 2008 summer festival. A set of workshops on an individual at each festival, and depends on what specialists in the craft will be at the moment at the festival; these are usually different types of handicrafts or crafts, as well as training in various physical exercises. Master classes are most often not invited to conduct a specific master class, but participants who come to the festival who share their skills. A participant who wants to conduct a master class agrees with the organizers in advance. Like mini-conversations, festival participants are offered plates with the names of master classes, which are held simultaneously.

At various festivals, participants were offered master classes in braiding, pottery and painting on fabric and paper, quilling, knitting, embroidery, weaving, making dolls, carving on wood, origami, scrapbooking, leather crafting, Floral design, acting skills, photography, singing, archery, hand-to-hand fighting, knife throwing, bell ringing and much more. The things done at the master-class with their own hands are often presented to the ward by playing the "angel". In addition, the festival ball is preceded by a master class on the dances that will be dance on it.

=== Roleplay ===
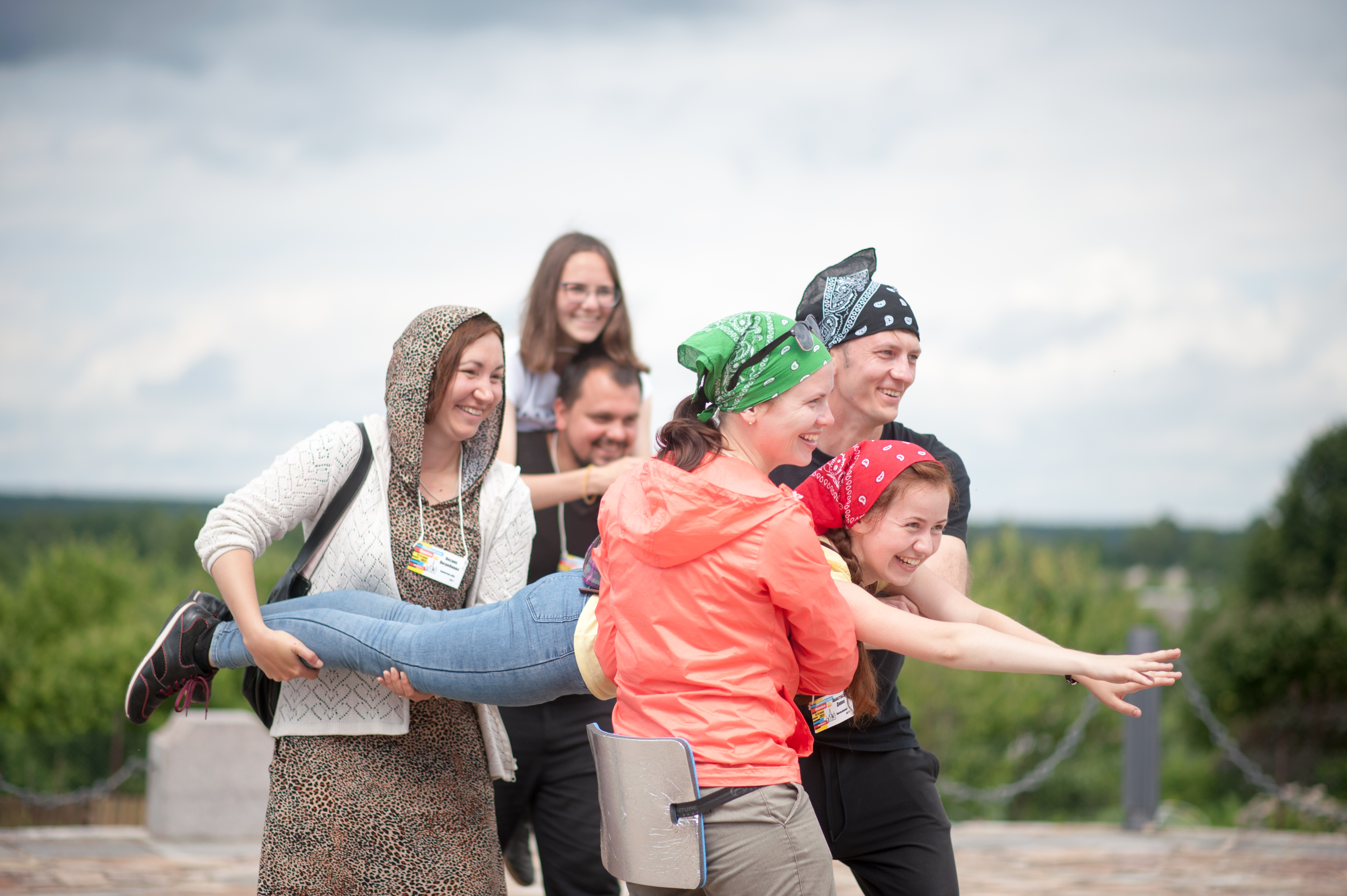
Participants of the rolegame perform a task on the Borodino field. 2017 Summer festival

An important component of each festival is a role-playing game similar to the quest, which combines the sports and educational components. Role play is usually associated with the history of the place where it is played.

Prior to the festival, some of its participants, from among the festival organizers and volunteers, memorize their roles and prepare appropriate clothing and other props for the image of a certain epoch, and when the role-playing game begins, they take their positions on the ground. The remaining participants are divided into groups. Which group a particular participant falls into is determined prior to the beginning of the festival and is written on a badge; when receiving a badge, the participant learns the name of his group. Each group has an individual route, which is indicated on the map issued to each group. When a group arrives at the next specified place, they are met by one or several actors in a particular image related to the role-playing theme, who tell their legend and then give the group a task. If the team copes with the task, it receives a part of one or another artifact. Regardless of whether the group coped with the next task, they go to carry out the following to fully follow the route they set.

A role-playing game, conducted at the place of its appearance, the Borodino field, usually cost around the 1812 Battle of Borodino and its participants, the heroes of the battle for Moscow in 1941, as well as devotees of piety of these places; all of them were already present at the 2006 festival. Among the heroes of the 1812 Patriotic War, participants in the quest can meet Kutuzov, Napoleon, Nadezhda Durova, hussars, French soldiers, Russian peasants, as well as the writer Leo Tolstoy, who described the Battle of Borodino in "War and Peace", and the author of "Borodino Panorama" Franz Roubaud. Of the heroes of the Great Patriotic War on the field, there are Red Army soldiers, Wehrmacht soldiers, partisans, nurses. Among the devotees of piety one can meet with the schema-nun Rachel (Korotkova) and Margarita Tuchkova. In addition, the very presence in the Borodino field and movement along it allowed the participants to clearly imagine the scale of the battlefield.

=== Festival Ball ===
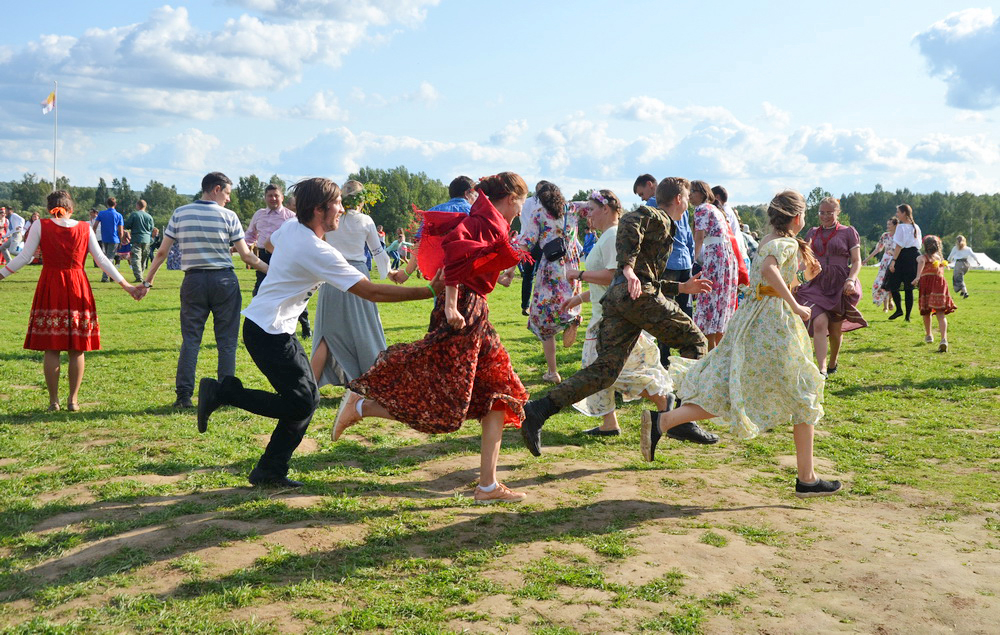
Folk ball. 2019 Summer Festival

The highlight of the festival is a costume ball. The ball was first held at the winter festival of 2012 in St. Petersburg.

Even before the festival, the theme of the ball is chosen and those who are going to take part in the ball, bring with them ball gowns and costumes. Before the ball, trainings are held where the participants learn the dances. As a rule, at summer festivals, folk dances are performed in the open air, and at winter festivals – ballroom dances (for example, polonaise, quadrille, waltz, cotillion, polka-troika) indoors.

For one ball, the participants dance a few simple dances. So about the very first ball in St. Petersburg they wrote: "Girls in beautiful dresses, gallant young people in costumes, a string quartet, a huge beautiful hall ... Despite the fact that many people danced ballroom dancing for the first time in their lives, thanks to a talented emcee-choreographer after half of hour, the postures leveled off, the movements became more accurate and ... it twirled. There is no doubt that the tradition of youth balls will be continued in different parts of Russia, Ukraine and Belarus".

The beginning of the ball at the summer festival of 2014 was described as follows: "Our whole tent camp changed in an instant. All the participants of the festival especially brought the Russian folk costume to the ball, who dressed like a Cossack, who were just wearing shoes, a shirt and trousers. But it all looked very grand, and the whole brethren rushed to the dance".

=== End of the festival ===
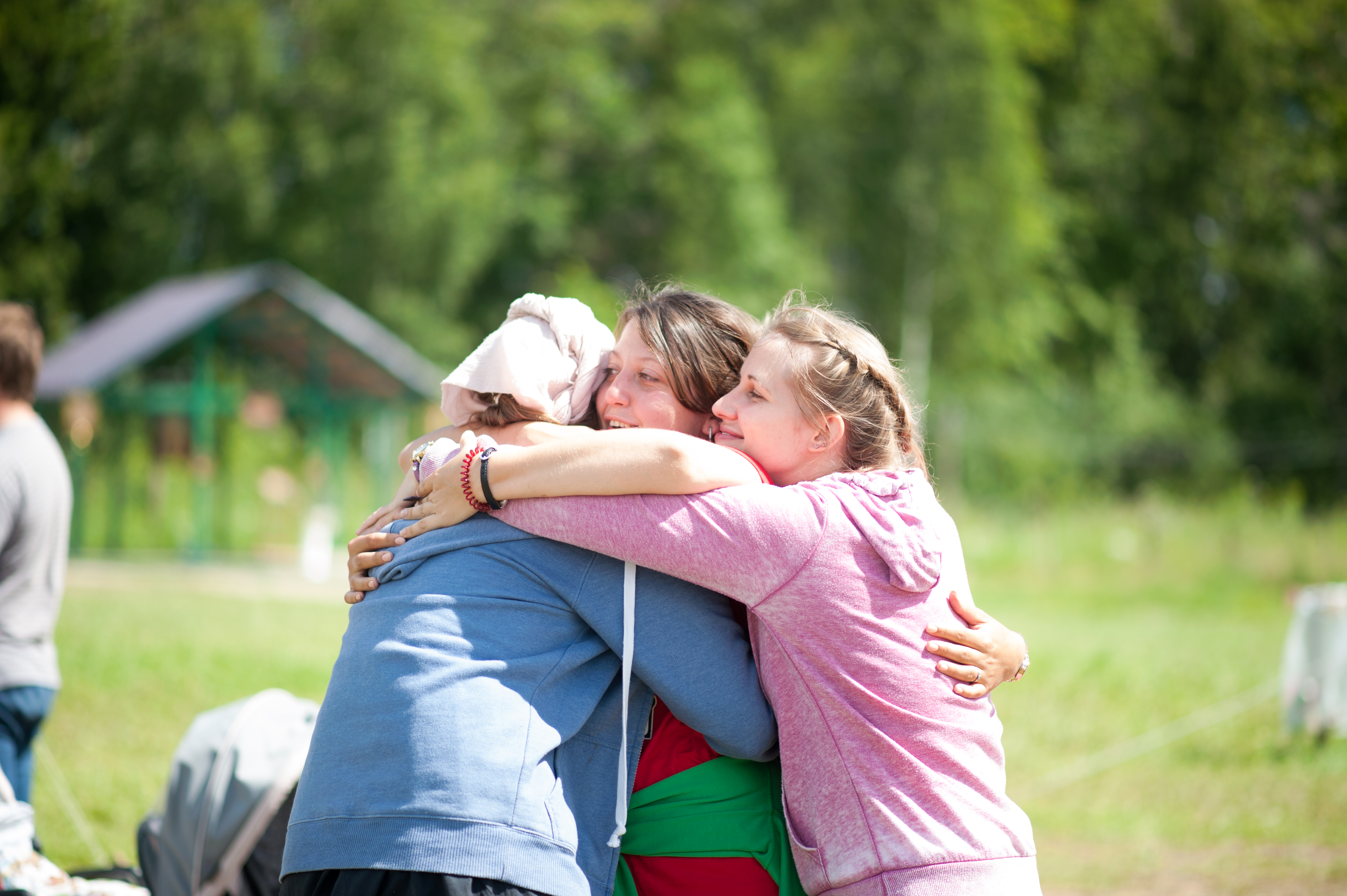
Farewell before leaving. 2017 summer festival

On the evening of the penultimate day of the festival, there is a final concert, where the best numbers repeat, from those shown on previous days, followed by a closing ceremony. Also at the final concert, letters of appreciation and similar awards are given to those who have particularly laboured to conduct this festival. Then a "farewell campfire" passes, after which (or instead of) the participants go to sleep.

The next morning, the liturgy is served and after lunch, at about noon, the next festival is presented, the venue of which has traditionally been kept secret before. Initially, the closing ceremony was the most recent festival event, followed by a departure of participants. At the summer festival in 2008, the closing ceremony was held on the evening of the penultimate day, and since 2009, the current order has been established.

After that, the participants of the festival say goodbye to each other and go home. Some participants of the festival immediately after the end of the festival "just go to visit each other so as not to part for at least a few more days".

After the participants leave, the volunteers dismantle temporary buildings, clean the garbage and leave themselves.

== Festival Community and Projects ==
=== Communication outside the festival ===
Acquaintances, which are started at the festival, often maintain after it. Festival participants communicate via the Internet, arrange local meetings, visit each other. As Yana Sedova noted: "Bratya is more than a festival. This is a family whose members live in different countries, but try to meet twice a year.".

The festival has a site bratia.ru with a forum (registered December 11, 2005); Groups are active in social networks Vkontakte, instagram and facebook, for which there are hashtags #БратьяФест #братьяфест #bratia #bratiafest.

In addition, according to the priest Yaroslav Yerofeyev: "We strive ... to organize such a place that the Brothers Festival was there all year round ... This is a spiritual and cultural center that young people can take year-round, and where the entire infrastructure would be. That is, there is a temple for the celebration of the Eucharist, and there is a concert hall ..., an open area for summer, a tent camp, a building where you can be accommodated in winter".

=== Fraternal trips ===
Even before the creation of the festival "Brothers" Orthodox youth group from Mozhaisk began to travel to Kyiv, where including met the first week of lent in the St. Jonah monastery. Since those who visited the festival wanted to meet more often, a winter festival was invented, "and then the volunteers began to celebrate the new year together, and then we organized inter-fraternal meetings. And trips began: together to Bari, together to Corfu, to France to the Shroud of Turin, to Italy".

According to the priest Yaroslav Yerofeyev: "Travels broaden horizons, erase many stereotypes about countries and people, give the opportunity to stay with relatives in spirit people in isolation from everyday worries. I try to participate in pilgrimage trips to touch our sacred Christian Tradition, which is preserved in the relics of God's saints, and in the bricks of ancient sanctuaries. And what is important: we always invite to our group only interesting and highly qualified guides!»

=== School of Volunteers ===
At the 2016 summer festival in Zaslavl, the team of volunteers did not work out. As a result, it was decided to train volunteers seriously, for which the "school of volunteers of the festival "Bryatya" was invented. Work on its creation began after the end of the 2017 winter festival. Victoria Anikeeva and Marina Zhironkina undertook the main work of its creation. Formulated goals and objectives of the "School of volunteers", clearly formulated requirements to the volunteer festival "Brothers", created a group in social network "Vkontakte", which was regularly replenished. All disciplines in the "School of volunteers" were divided into 4 blocks (according to the number of teachers): spiritual (priest Yaroslav Erofeev), practical (Oksana Shashuto), psychological (Marina Zhironkina), game (Victoria Anikeeva). The goal of the volunteer school was not only to give knowledge to its students, but also to unite them into a single team, "immerse them in the atmosphere of the festival, help everyone to tune in to the upcoming hard selfless work, learn to survive in difficult conditions".

For the first time, the "School of volunteers" was held from 9 to 14 July 2017 at the Borodino field, just before the festival held there. In the future, the "School of volunteers" came during the 7 days immediately before the festival. In addition to studying at the "School of volunteers" its students had to study and deal with the device of the festival camp. On the last day of the "School..." a "trust trail" was held, which was a series of tests aimed at ensuring that volunteers unconditionally trusted and came to the aid of each other if needed. The peculiarity of the "volunteer School" was that those who successfully trained, immediately put on a red t-shirt and began to practice.

In the future, the "School of volunteers" came annually during the week immediately before the summer festival. Upon completion of the training participants receive certificates of the Synodal Department for youth Affairs of the Russian Orthodox Church on passing the School of volunteers.

=== Orthodox psychological workshop ===
In September 2017, it was announced that the "Orthodox Psychological Workshop" was organized by the volunteer of the festival "Brothers" and one of the creators of the "School of the Volunteer" psychologist Marina Zhironkina. The first "workshop" was held from 4 to 6 November in Mozhaisk 2017. The program included lectures, trainings, master classes, psychological film club, playback theatre, drawing in the style of "neurography". After that, the "Workshop" was held twice a year, in spring and autumn.

=== Bratya – Family ===
Due to the fact that many participants of the festival "grew up, got married, had children, acquire family and friends, but the desire to get together has not dried up", as well as "the range of issues and interests has changed significantly", the organizers decided that "the Festival should grow with everyone" and announced on March 25, 2018 the first family festival "Bratya", created specifically for married couple with children and in March 2018 it was announced about the holding of the first family festival "Bratya", created specifically for couples with children, which was held from September 29 to October 6, 2018 on Corfu Island. Since then it has been held annually in autumn in the Mediterranea.

The program includes: conversations and discussions; "fathers and mothers of the festival"; advice on medicine, pregnancy and childbirth, family education, child rearing; "Warm-up-dance minutes"; excursions to shrines and beautiful places; games, quests, quiz and "fun and interesting movement", swimming in the sea.

=== "Fraternal mail" ===
In March 2018, the campaign was held for the first time on mailing among participants of Easter cards using the postcrossing system. Each participant filled in the form, indicated his exact address. After that, the organizers sent 5 addresses to personal messages to each enroller, after which he had to prepare and send colorful cards to these addresses, and then receive 5 cards from five different addresses. The action was repeated before Christmas, in connection with which the website was announced on November 3 of the same year the domain post.bratia.ru was announced. Since then mailing occurs twice a year: before Easter and before Christmas.

According to the organizers: "the festival can not stop and carries its joy on, around! New projects are being created, new ideas are being implemented... One of them is the idea to join the fraternal world with each piece — a postcard, signed with his own hand, with the text coming from the heart, with a small gift, bearing the fragrance of his soul donor... Yes, just like before...)) Admit, nothing will replace a few lines written by a dear hand and attention – the most precious of gifts».
