= Quill (disambiguation) =

A quill is a writing tool made from the wing feather of a large bird.

Quill may also refer to:

== Computer software ==
- QUILL, a programming language used in Quintiq software
- Quill (software), a 1982 suite of tools for literacy development
- Oculus Quill, a painting and animation software for virtual reality
- The Quill (software), a 1983 computer program to write adventure games
- Quill, a word processor developed by Psion
- Quill, an automated narrative generator from Narrative Science

== Films ==
- Quill (film), a 2004 Japanese movie
- Quills (film), a 2000 English movie

== Mechanical parts ==
- Quill (bicycle part), a component that connects handlebars to the steerer tube of the fork
- Quill drive, a mechanism to connect drive shafts together so they need not be oriented in the same direction
- The non-rotating shaft that houses the spindle in a pillar drill

== Music ==
- Quill (band), a US band that played at the Woodstock festival
  - Quill (album)
- The Quill (band), a Swedish stoner rock/metal band
  - The Quill (album), 1995
- Quill, one of many plectra in a harpsichord, made from a feather or synthetic material
- The quills, an old word in the United States and Britain for pan pipes

== Places ==
- Lake Quill in New Zealand, source of the Sutherland Falls
- Quill, Georgia, a community in the United States
- Quill City, Malaysia
- Quill Lakes, a wetland complex in Saskatchewan, Canada
- Quill Lake, Saskatchewan, a village northwest of Quill Lakes
- The Quill (volcano), Sint Eustatius, Caribbean Netherlands

== Publishing ==
- Quill (comics), several Marvel Comics characters
- Quill (magazine), the magazine of the Society of Professional Journalists in the US
- The Quill (magazine), literary magazine of Bowdoin College, Brunswick, Maine, US
- The Quill (newspaper), the student newspaper at Brandon University, Canada
- Quill Award, an American literary award given 2005–2007
- Quill Awards (Australia), Australian journalism awards given annually by the Melbourne Press Club

== Other uses ==
- Quill (surname), an Irish surname
- Quill Corporation, a retailer based in Lincolnshire, Illinois
- Quill Corp. v. North Dakota, a United States Supreme Court case regarding use tax
- "Quill" (Grimm), a 2012 episode of the TV series Grimm
- Quill (horse), an American Thoroughbred racehorse
- Spine (zoology), a needle-like anatomical structure in some animals
- Quill (satellite), a reconnaissance satellite programme
- Quills (play), a 1995 play by Doug Wright

== See also ==
- Golden Quill, an American stage acting award
- Quiller (disambiguation)
- Quilling, an art form
- Quillwork, traditional Native American art form
- Quillwort, common name of Isoetes
