= Lake Quill =

Lake in New Zealand

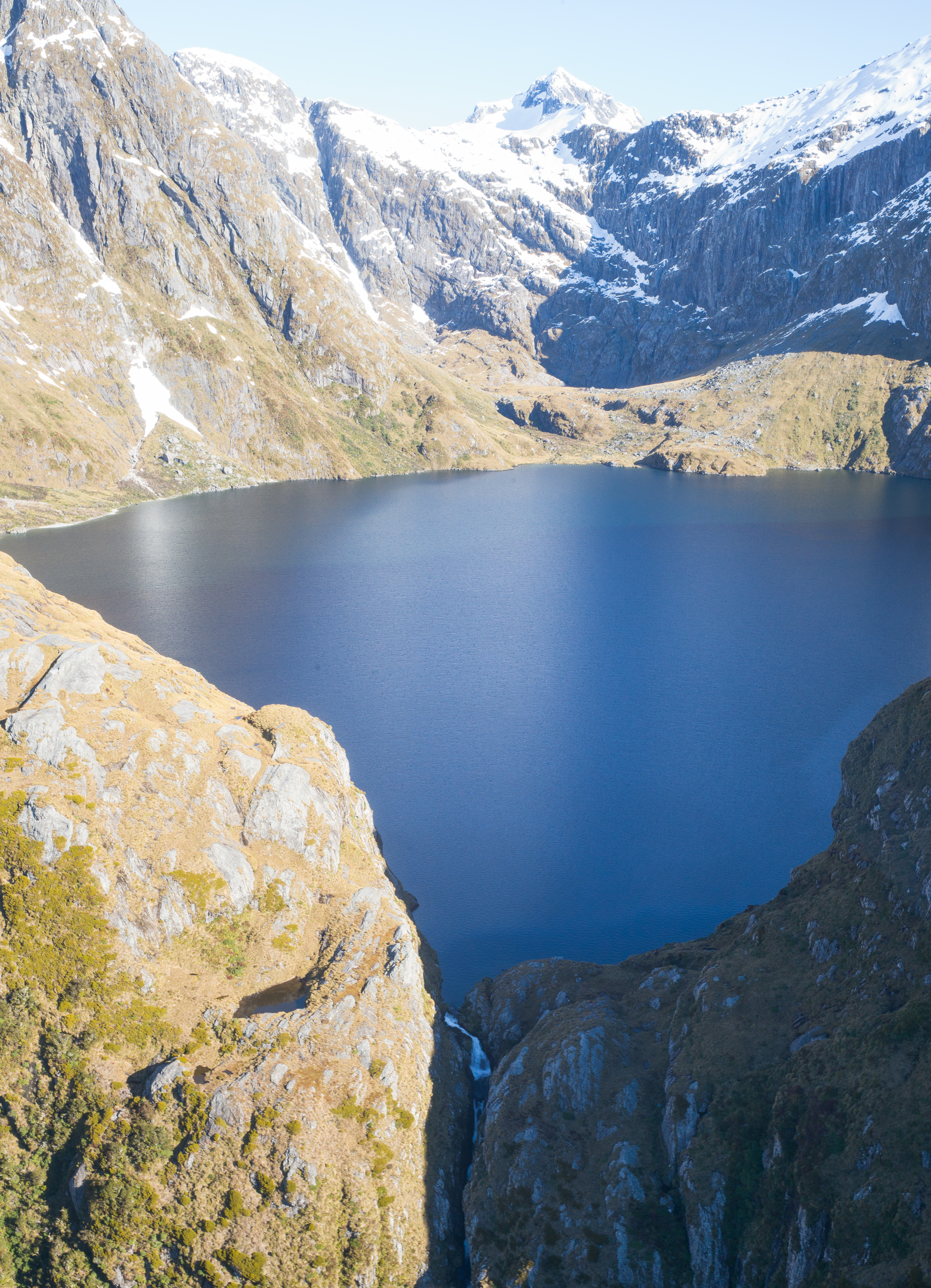
- Lake Quill and the top of Sutherland Falls

- Location within New Zealand
- Interactive map of Lake Quill
- Location: Fiordland National Park
- Coordinates: 44°48.5′S 167°43.5′E
- Type: tarn
- Etymology: named after William Quill
- Primary outflows: Sutherland Falls
- Surface area: 1.2 square kilometres (0.46 sq mi)
- Surface elevation: 979 metres (3,212 ft)

Lake Quill is a tarn located high up in New Zealand's Fiordland National Park.

It is located in the Fiordland National Park at 979 m above sea level. It is approximately 1.2km^{2}. The lake may have formed by movement of glaciers during the last ice age.

The cirque lake is the source of Sutherland Falls, one of the highest waterfalls in the country and seventh-highest in the world. They cascade from Lake Quill in three tiers into the Arthur Valley alongside the Milford Track, approximately 20km from Milford Sound.

== Name ==
The lake was named after William Quill, who climbed Sutherland Falls in 1890 to be the first European to discover the falls' source. It was previously called Lake William.

== Recreation ==
Helicopter tours of the lake and its falls allow an encompassing view of the landscape. A climb to the lake is possible from McKinnon Pass. This destination, as well as the base of Sutherland Falls, can be reached via the Milford Track. This popular multi-day tramp is a New Zealand Great Walk and requires booking with the Department of Conservation.

== In popular culture ==
In 2018, the lake was used as a filming location for Mission: Impossible – Fallout featuring Tom Cruise flying an Airbus Helicopters H125 helicopter.

The lake was used as a wallpaper for Microsoft's Windows 10 and Windows 11 operating system.
