= Quintin McKinnon =

New Zealand explorer and surveyor (1851–1892)

Quintin McPherson McKinnon (1851–1892) was a Scottish New Zealand explorer and tour guide.

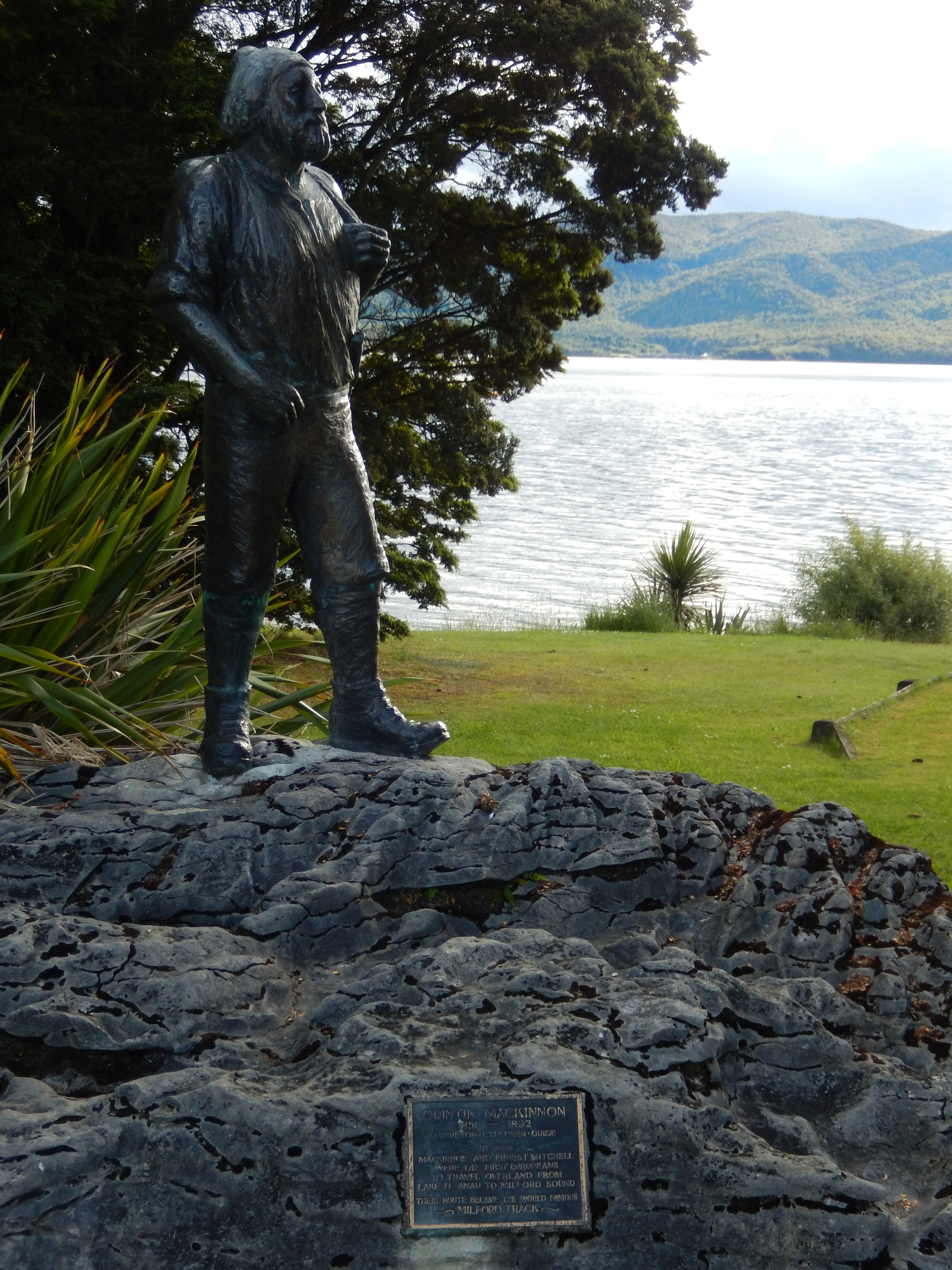
Quintin McKinnon Statue in Te Anau

McKinnon was born in Argyllshire in Scotland and emigrated to New Zealand sometime in the 1870s. In 1879 he married Barbara Sinclair in Dunedin. They had two sons Quintin Gillies McKinnon (b. 1881) and Robert Daniel McKinnon (b. 1882-d.1885). Although he spelt his name Quintin McKinnon, he is also referred to in both official documents and newspaper reports variously as Quintin, Quinton, MacKinnon, Mackinnon and McKinnon.

McKinnon explored the central and west coast of the South Island of New Zealand. His name has been applied to various landmarks and geographical features in the Milford and Fiordland area including McKinnon Pass, Lake McKinnon, the Quintin Huts on Milford Track, and the St. Quintin Falls in Clinton Valley.

In 1887 McKinnon was employed by the Otago Survey Department to try to find a tourist route into Milford Sound. He was unsuccessful in this first attempt but hopeful that a pass could be discovered. In 1888 the Otago Survey Department again employed McKinnon, this time with Ernest Mitchell. They were instructed to cut a track up the river and to find a pass while C.W. Adams, the chief surveyor, took a party to survey the country fringing Milford Sound. Included in the party were Thomas Mackenzie, William Soltau Pillans, and the commercial photographer, Fred Muir. McKinnon was successful and discovered a passage between the head of Lake Te Anau and Milford Sound. He and Mitchell crossed the pass and joined the surveying party on the other side. The pass was named Mackinnon Pass (now officially Omanui / McKinnon Pass). The route became known as the Milford Track and this was the first practicable overland route across the South Island.

After the discovery of the pass McKinnon spent time improving the track and taking regular parties of sightseers and tourists through the area. He offered a guided tour from Lake Te Anau to Sutherland Falls. He was also contracted to carry the mail between Te Anau and Milford Sound.

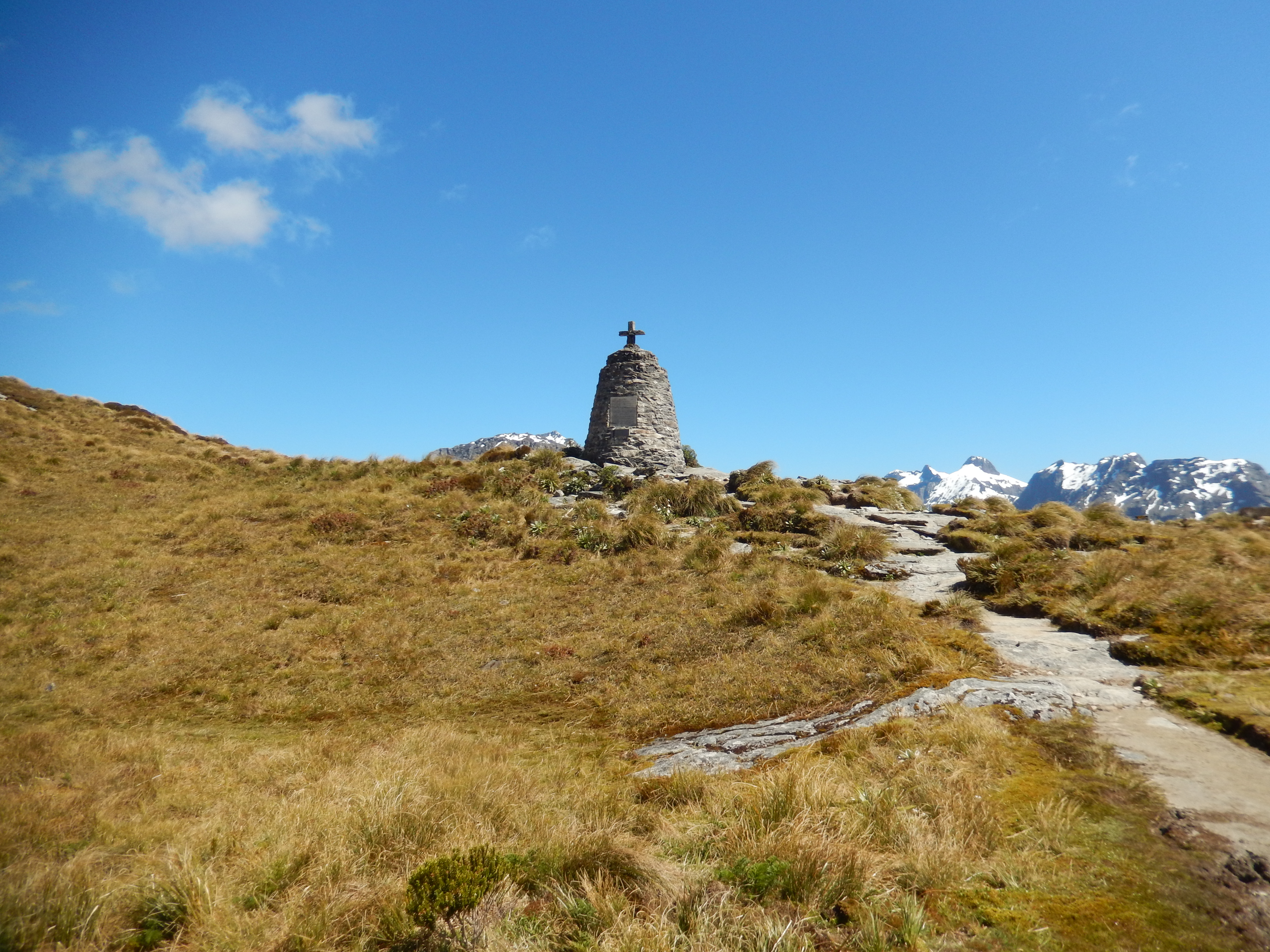
Memorial cairn on McKinnon Pass

On 29 November 1892 McKinnon departed to cross Lake Te Anau to go to Milford but never arrived. He was last seen sailing with a fair wind on Lake Te Anau by a hand from the Te Anau station. A search party was sent to the area in January 1893 but did not find any trace of him. His wrecked boat and belongings were discovered but his body was never recovered. He was presumed drowned in Lake Te Anau.

A public subscription was raised to build the Quintin MacKinnon Memorial Cairn which stands at the summit of McKinnon Pass.
