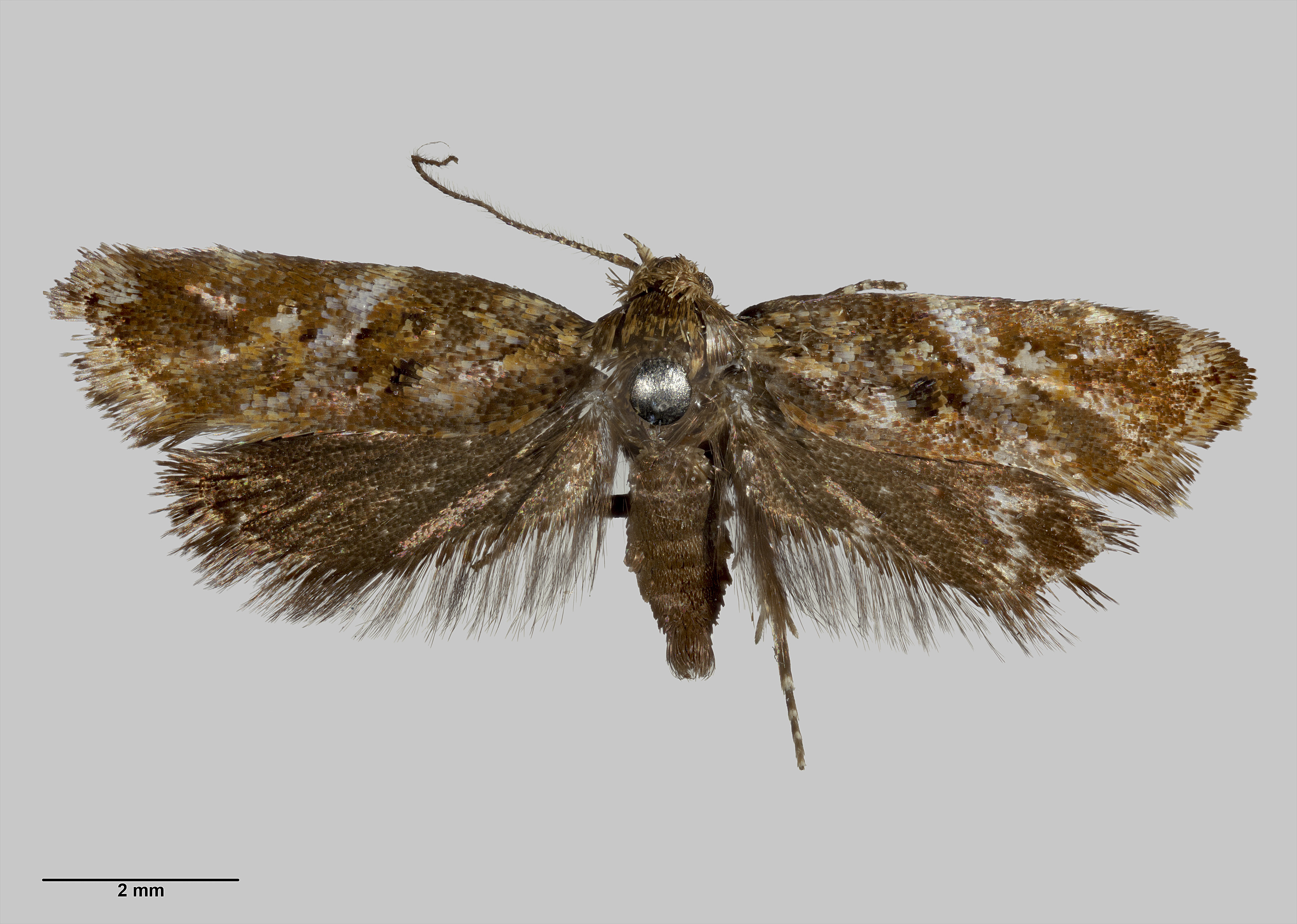

Scientific classification
- Kingdom: Animalia
- Phylum: Arthropoda
- Class: Insecta
- Order: Lepidoptera
- Family: Oecophoridae
- Genus: Tingena
- Species: T. eumenopa

Binomial name
- Tingena eumenopa (Meyrick, 1926)

Synonyms
- Trachypepla eumenopa Meyrick, 1926; Trachypepla metallifera Philpott, 1928

= Tingena eumenopa =

Species of moth, endemic to New Zealand

Tingena eumenopa is a species of moth in the family Oecophoridae. It is endemic to New Zealand and found in the North and South Islands. The adults have been found amongst tree ferns and are on the wing in December.

== Taxonomy ==
T. eumenopa was first described by Edward Meyrick in 1926 using specimens collected at Wainuiomata in December and originally named Trachypepla eumenopa. George Hudson discussed this species under the name Trachypepla eumenopa in his 1928 publication The butterflies and moths of New Zealand. In 1939 Hudson synonymised Trachypepla metallifera with this species. In 1988 J. S. Dugdale placed this species within the genus Tingena. The male lectotype, collected at Wainuiomata, is held at the Natural History Museum, London.

== Description ==
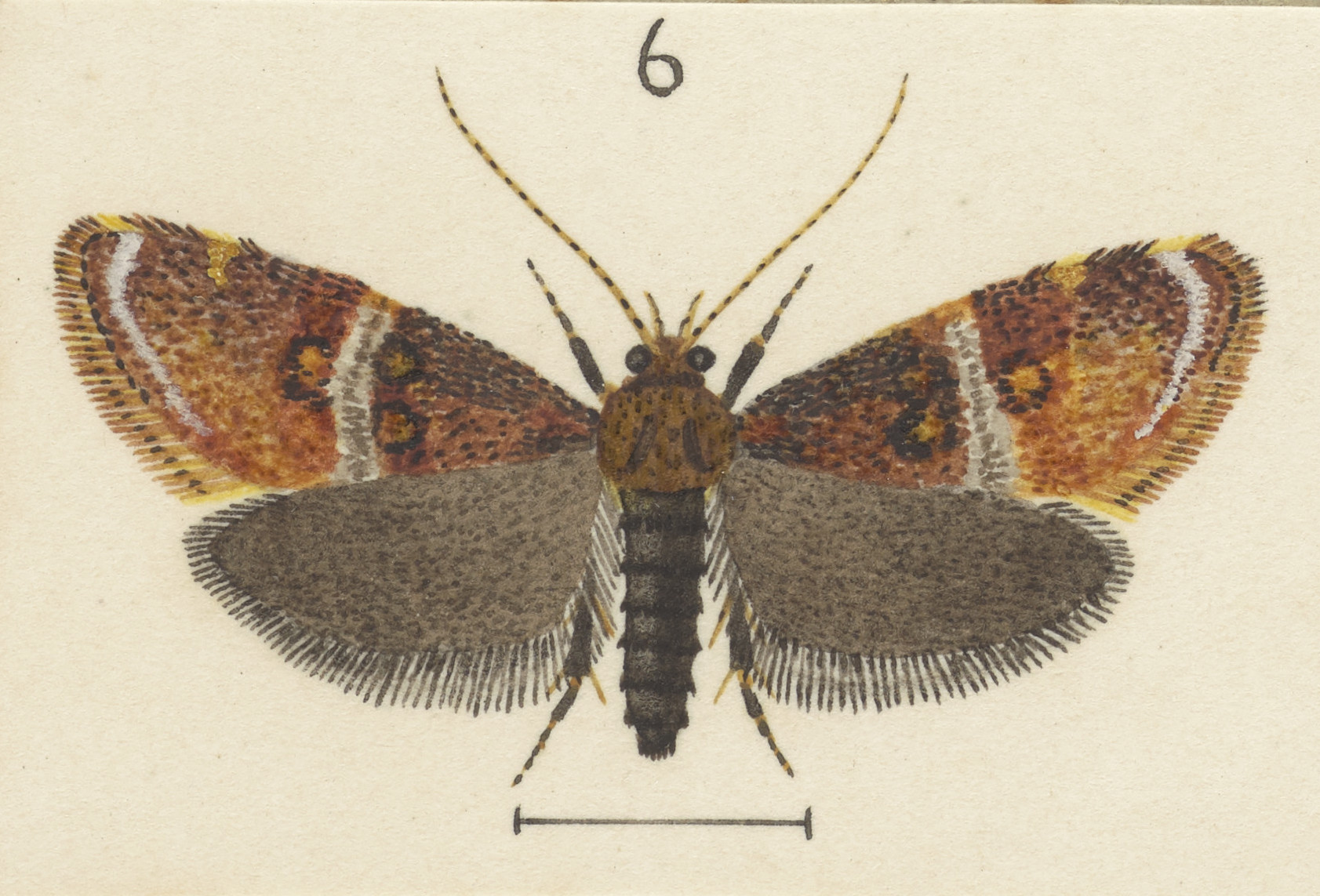
Illustration of T. eumenopa by George Hudson.

This species was originally described by Meyrick as follows:

♂ ♀. 12 mm. Head pale ochreous, more or less irrorated fuscous. Palpi pale ochreous sprinkled blackish. Antennal ciliations in male 2. Thorax ferruginous-ochreous irrorated dark fuscous. Abdomen dark grey. Forewings elongate, apex obtuse, termen obliquely rounded; violet-grey irrorated dark fuscous, disc more or less wholly suffused deep ferruginous-brown; some ochreous marking near base; stigmata forming raised tufts, plical beneath first discal, both these irrorated blackish, second discal forming an irregular white dot partially edged blackish irroration, some bright ochreous suffusion beneath this; two rather oblique irregular whitish striae crossing wing between discal stigmata, confluent and yellowish on costa, becoming obsolete towards dorsum; an indistinct yellowish spot on costa at ¾; an irregular whitish spot just before apex, and series of scattered scales before termen: cilia yellow-whitish with two broad shades, first yellow-brownish, second purplish, purplish blotches at apex and on costa towards apex. Hindwings and cilia blackish-grey.

== Distribution ==
This species is endemic to New Zealand. As well as the type locality of Wainuiomata this species has also been observed in Whangārei, Raurimu, Waimarino, Gouland Downs, Nelson, Dunedin, Eglinton Valley and at the Milford Track.

== Behaviour ==
The adults of this species are on the wing in December.

== Habitat ==
This species has been collected amongst tree ferns.
