= Quiller (disambiguation) =

Quiller is a fictional spy created by English novelist Elleston Trevor.

Quiller may also refer to:

== People ==
- Andrew Quiller, pen name of Kenneth Bulmer (1921–2005), British author, primarily of science fiction
- Arthur Quiller-Couch (1863–1944), British writer who published under the pen name of Q
- John Quiller Rowett (1874–1924), British businessman in the spirits industry
- Mabel Quiller-Couch (1866–1924), English editor, compiler and children's writer
- Richard Quiller Couch, (1816–1863), British naturalist
- William Quiller Orchardson (1832–1910), Scottish portraitist and painter of domestic and historical subjects

== Other ==
- Quiller (TV series), a British television series featuring the Elleston Trevor character

== See also ==
- Aquiller
- Quill (disambiguation)
- Quilling
- Qullar (disambiguation)
