= McKinnon Pass =

Mountain pass in New Zealand

Omanui / McKinnon Pass
- Māori: Omanui
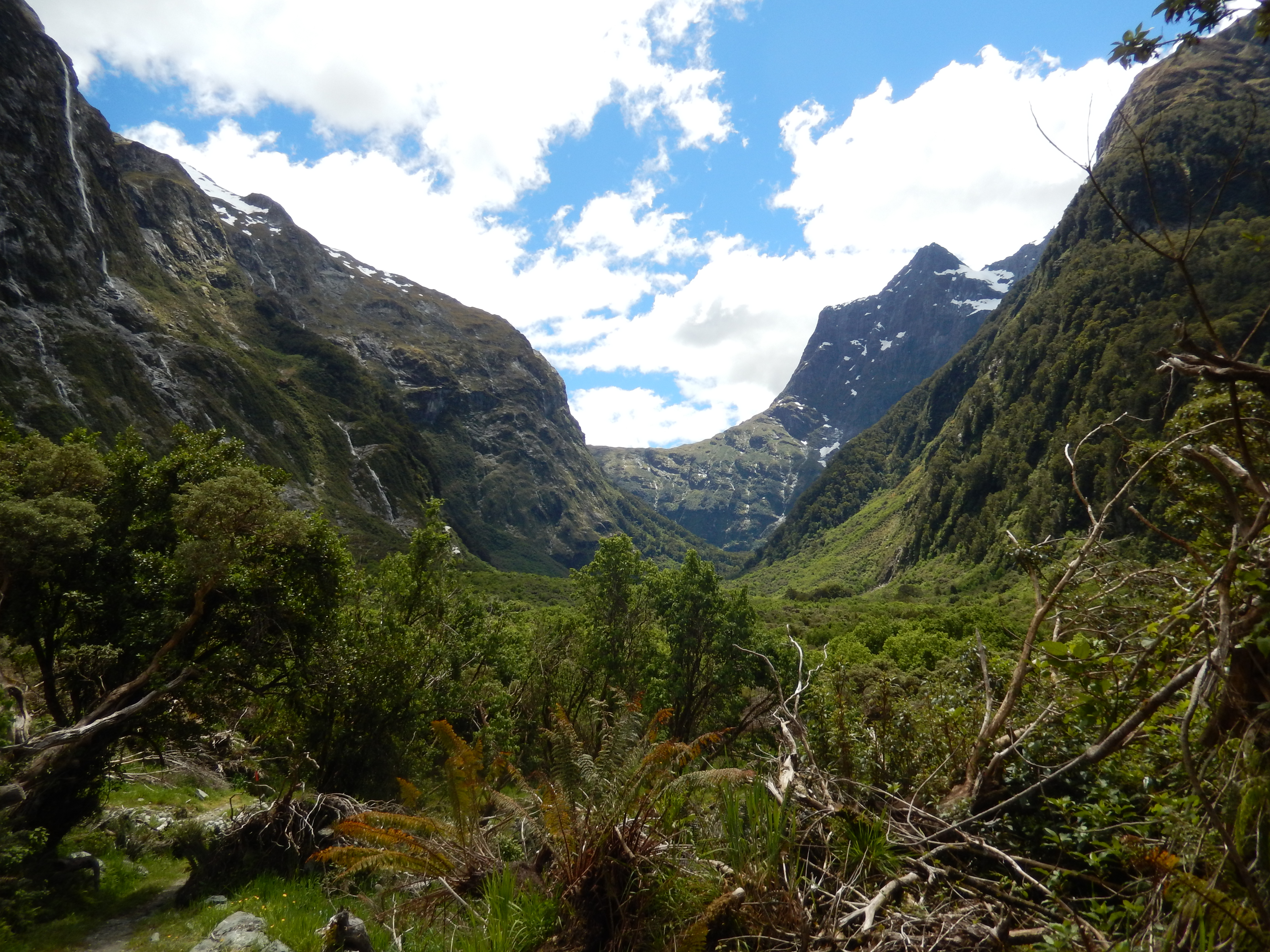
- Looking up the Clinton River valley to Omanui / McKinnon Pass

- Location within Fiordland
- Elevation: 1,156 metres (3,793 ft)
- Traversed by: Milford Track

Third Approach
- Location: Fiordland, New Zealand
- Coordinates: 44°48′7″S 167°45′58″E

Omanui / McKinnon Pass (previously spelt Mackinnon Pass) is an alpine pass between Mount Hart and Mount Balloon in Fiordland, New Zealand. The pass is at an elevation of 1,154 metres (3,786 ft) and is located 19 kilometres (12 mi) southwest of Milford Sound / Piopiotahi. The pass is the highest point of the famous Milford Track connecting Lake Te Anau and the Clinton River valley with the Arthur River valley and Milford Sound / Piopiotahi.

== History ==
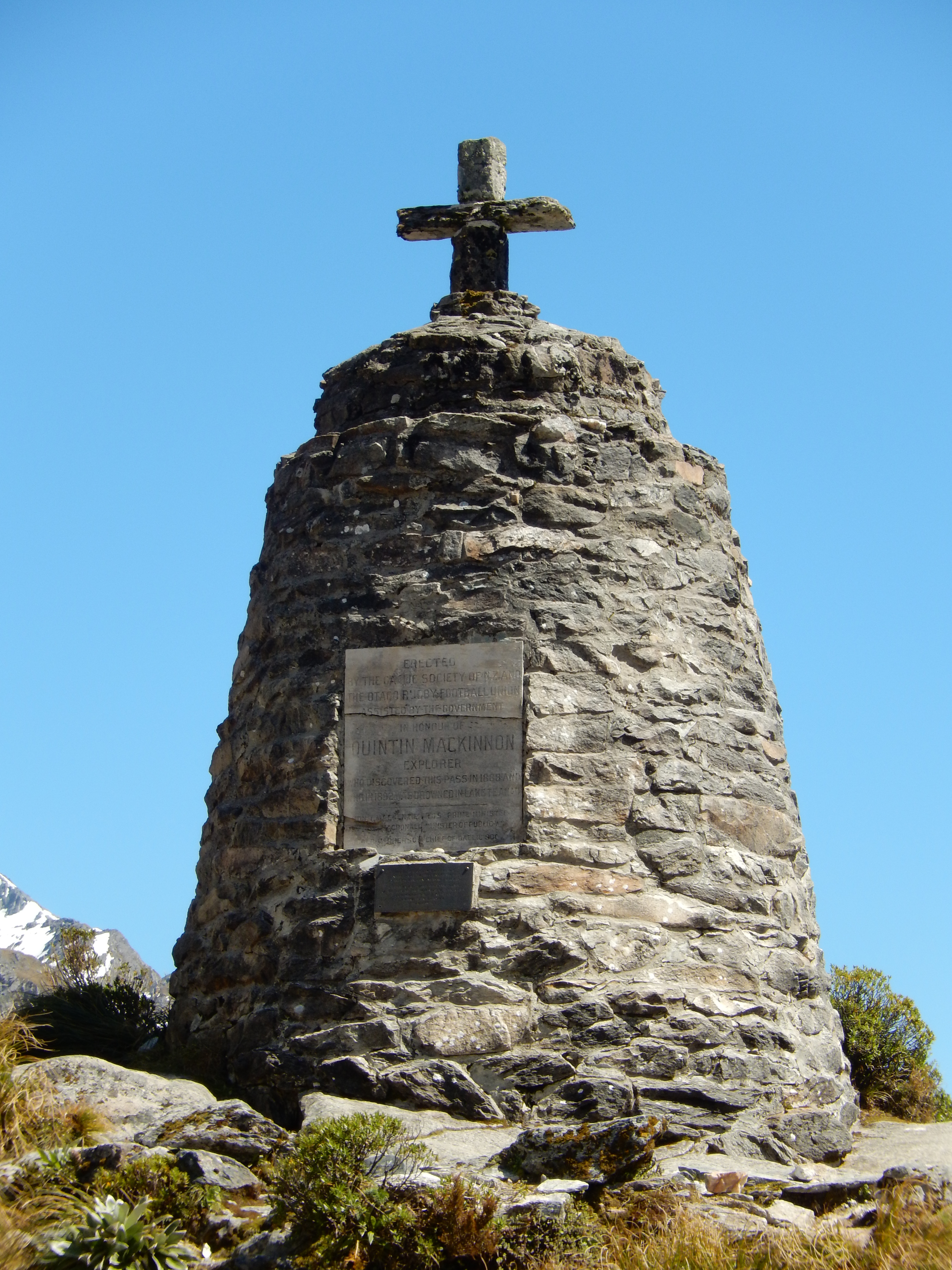
McKinnon Memorial

The pass was known to local Māori as Omanui meaning "the great running" or "the great escape".

Europeans did not discover the pass until October 1888 when Quintin McKinnon and Ernest Mitchell made their way over the pass from the Clinton Valley. McKinnon had been commissioned by the chief surveyor of Otago to find a route from Te Anau to Milford Sound. McKinnon and Mitchell spent a month slashing a track through the forest and eventually made their way across the pass to reach the existing track to Sutherland Falls. The McKinnon Memorial, a large cairn, is located at the pass commemorating the traverse of the route by McKinnon.

The pass was known for a number of years as Mackinnon Pass although it later was agreed that the correct spelling was McKinnon. The name was officially changed in July 2022, correcting the spelling and adding the Māori name to form the dual name Omanui / McKinnon Pass.

Today, the pass is crossed by thousands of hikers every year on the Milford Track. There is a day shelter at the top of the pass for hikers to use as a rest point and for use in emergencies.

== Views ==
Although often clouded in, the pass offers spectacular 360-degree views. The pass is on the ridge between the 1,857-metre-high (6,093 ft) Mount Balloon to the east and the 1,769-metre-high (5,804 ft) Mount Hart to the west. Mount Elliot is visible to the north.

== Climate ==
Climate data for Castle Mount, elevation 2,000 m (6,600 ft), (1991–2020)
Month	Jan	Feb	Mar	Apr	May	Jun	Jul	Aug	Sep	Oct	Nov	Dec	Year
Mean daily maximum °C (°F)	7.7 (45.9)	8.1 (46.6)	7.8 (46.0)	4.9 (40.8)	3.0 (37.4)	1.2 (34.2)	−0.4 (31.3)	0.0 (32.0)	1.8 (35.2)	2.1 (35.8)	4.0 (39.2)	6.4 (43.5)	3.9 (39.0)
Daily mean °C (°F)	4.2 (39.6)	4.7 (40.5)	4.4 (39.9)	1.5 (34.7)	−0.2 (31.6)	−1.9 (28.6)	−3.5 (25.7)	−2.9 (26.8)	−1.5 (29.3)	−1.3 (29.7)	0.5 (32.9)	3.0 (37.4)	0.6 (33.1)
Mean daily minimum °C (°F)	0.7 (33.3)	1.3 (34.3)	1.0 (33.8)	−1.8 (28.8)	−3.5 (25.7)	−5.0 (23.0)	−6.7 (19.9)	−5.9 (21.4)	−4.9 (23.2)	−4.7 (23.5)	−3.0 (26.6)	−0.5 (31.1)	−2.7 (27.1)
Source: NIWA
