= Hooray! It's a Deathtrip =

Album by The Quill

Studio album by The Quill
- Released: 7 October 2003
- Recorded: Slaughterhouse Studios Halmstad, Berno Studios Malmö
- Genre: Stoner rock, Heavy metal, Hard rock
- Length: 52:14
- Label: SPV/Steamhammer
- Producer: Rickard Bengtsson and The Quill

The Quill chronology
Voodoo Caravan (2002)	Hooray! It's a Deathtrip (2003)	In Triumph (2006)

Hooray! It's a Deathtrip is the fourth album by Swedish rock band The Quill.

== Track listing ==
1. "Spinning Around" – 4:39
2. "Nothing Ever Changes" – 4:53
3. "Come What May" – 4:02
4. "Too Close To The Sun" – 5:25
5. "Handful of Flies" – 4:59
6. "American Powder" – 3:55
7. "Hammerhead" – 5:28
8. "Giver" – 4:23
9. "Man Posed" – 6:00
10. "Because I'm God" – 3:16
11. "Control" – 5:14

== Personnel ==
=== The Quill ===
- Magnus Ekwall - Vocals
- Christian Carlsson - Guitar
- Roger Nilsson - Bass
- George "Jolle" Atlagic - Drums

=== Additional personnel ===
- Hasse Carlsson - Sitar on "Handful of Flies"
