= Full Circle (The Quill album) =

Studio album by The Quill
- Released: June 2011
- Recorded: Grand Studios Gävle
- Genre: Stoner rock; heavy metal; hard rock
- Length: 53:35
- Label: Metalville Records
- Producer: The Quill & Petter Diamant

The Quill chronology
In Triumph (2006)	Full Circle (2011)	Tiger Blood (2013)

Full Circle is the sixth album by Swedish rock band The Quill.

== Track listing ==
1. "Sleeping With Your Enemy" – 4:35
2. "Full Circle" – 4:26
3. "Black Star" – 3:42
4. "Medicine" – 3:56
5. "Bring It On" – 3:39
6. "River Of A Moonchild" – 4:20
7. "24/7 Groove" – 3:32
8. "White Flag" – 3:27
9. "Pace That Kills" – 4:12
10. "No Easy Way Out" – 5:41
11. "Running" – 4:13
12. "More Alive" – 4:58
13. "Waiting For The Sun" – 4:01

== Personnel ==
=== The Quill ===
- Magnus Arnar - vocals
- Christian Carlsson - guitar
- Robert Triches - bass
- George "Jolle" Atlagic - drums

=== Additional personnel ===
- Conny Bloom - Sitar on "Black Star"
