= In Triumph =

Studio album by The Quill
- Released: 27 June 2006
- Recorded: September – October 2005, Area 51 Studios, Celle, Germany
- Genre: Stoner rock, heavy metal, hard rock
- Length: 54:12
- Label: SPV/Steamhammer
- Producer: Tommy Newton

The Quill chronology
Hooray! It's a Deathtrip (2003)	In Triumph (2006)	Full Circle (2011)

In Triumph is the fifth album by Swedish rock band The Quill.

== Track listing ==
1. "Keep The Circle Whole" – 3:34
2. "Yeah" – 3:38
3. "Slave/Master" – 5:02
4. "Broken Man" – 3:15
5. "Man in Mind" – 4:22
6. "Merciless Room" – 4:40
7. "Trespass" – 4:00
8. "Black" – 5:07
9. "No Light On The Dark Side" – 4:34
10. "Triumph Is a Sea of Flame" – 4:52
11. "In the Shadows" – 4:22
12. "Down" – 6:46

Bonus: Broken Man (Video)

All songs written by Atlagic/Carlsson/Ekwall except "Broken Man" written by Atlagic/Carlsson/Ekwall/Triches

== Personnel ==
- Magnus Ekwall - Vocals
- Christian Carlsson - Guitar
- Robert Triches - Bass
- George "Jolle" Atlagic - Drums
