= The Quill (album) =

Studio album by The Quill
- Released: March 1995; 2000 (reissue)
- Recorded: Berno Studios, Malmö
- Genre: Stoner rock, Heavy metal, Hard rock, Psychedelia
- Length: 56:30
- Label: Megarock Records, Meteorcity, People Like U
- Producer: The Quill

The Quill chronology
The Quill (1995)	Silver Haze (1999)

2000 Reissue Cover

The Quill is the first album by Swedish rock band The Quill.

== Track listing ==
=== Original 1995 release ===
1. "Jet of Water" – 4:13
2. "Dry" – 5:03
3. "Lodestar" – 4:00
4. "Homespun" – 4:36
5. "From Where I Am" – 7:46
6. "The Flood" – 3:37
7. "In My Shed" – 4:06
8. "Gleam" – 3:55
9. "Not a Single Soul" – 4:27
10. "In The Sunlight I Drown" – 3:34
11. "I Lost a World Today" – 7:35
12. "Sweetly" - 3:32

=== 2000 reissue ===
1. "Dry" – 5:03
2. "Lodestar" – 4:00
3. "Homespun" – 4:36
4. "From Where I Am" – 7:46
6. "The Flood" – 3:37
7. "In My Shed" – 4:06
8. "A Sinner's Fame" – 6:21
9. "Not a Single Soul" – 4:27
10. "In The Sunlight I Drown" – 3:34
11. "I Lost a World Today" – 7:35
12. "Sweetly" - 3:32
13. "I Lost a World Today (Live)" - Hidden Bonus Track

== Personnel ==
- Magnus Ekwall - Vocals
- Christian Carlsson - Guitar
- Anders Haglund - Hammond B3 & Fender Rhodes
- Roger Nilsson - Bass
- George "Jolle" Atlagic - Drums
