= The Quill (band) =

Swedish band

- The Quill 2017, left to right: Magnus Ekwall, Christian Carlsson, George "Jolle" Atlagic, Roger Nilsson

Background information
- Origin: Sweden
- Genres: Stoner rock, heavy metal, hard rock
- Years active: 1992–present
- Labels: Froghouse, Megarock, JVC, Steamhammer, SPV, Metalville,
- Members: Magnus Ekwall; Christian Carlsson; George Atlagic; Roger Nilsson
- Past members: Magnus Arnar; Peter Holm; Anders Haglund; Robert Triches
- Website: www.thequill.se

The Quill are a Swedish stoner rock/heavy metal band.

== Biography ==
The Quill was formed in the early 1990s by singer Magnus Ekwall, guitarist Christian Carlsson, drummer George Atlagic, organist Anders Haglund and bassist Peter Holm. The Quill played the Swedish bar circuit the following years. Peter Holm left the band at the end of 1993 and was replaced by Roger Nilsson. After writing material for half a year they entered Berno studio in Malmö and recorded their self-titled debut The Quill in three weeks.

After signing a record deal with Megarock Records their debut was released in Europe in March 1995. A video for the track "Jet of water" was recorded. The album got an overwhelming reception by the critics and was later voted number 70 in Sweden's biggest newspaper "Aftonbladet" poll, Top 100 albums of the year. Other reviews that can be mentioned: 4 out of 5 in Raw, 81 out of 100 in Burrn! magazine.

After a short promotion tour in Sweden with Abstrakt Algebra, The Quill played the Karlshamn Rockfestival. A tour in Germany was booked but was later cancelled due to some trouble with the record company. Instead The Quill played some more festivals in Sweden. After playing all over Sweden for almost a year the band started working on the next album. In May 1997 Anders Haglund decided to leave the band, the others feeling no need of a new organ player decided to continue as a four-piece band. In August 1997 the band again entered Berno Studio in Malmö and started working on the second album Silver Haze. A month later the band had recorded 13 new songs.

Since the release of the album was delayed and The Quill had written some new songs that they wanted on the album, so they re-entered Berno Studios in the summer of 1998 and recorded the tracks "Grand Canyon, "Under a vow" and "Mercury". At the same session they also recorded the song "A Sinner's Fame" originally made by the band Trouble, and the song "Fairies Wear Boots" originally recorded by Black Sabbath. During the autumn of 1998 they did a smaller tour of Sweden.

The beginning of 1999 finally saw the release of the second album entitled Silver Haze. The summer also saw the release of a 10" EP called Evermore on Froghouse records as well as a praised performance at Sweden Rock Festival. During the summer the band entered Berno Studios twice recording their versions of "Where Eagles Dare" by Iron Maiden, "Frozen Over" by Captain Beyond and "Mount Everest" by November.

In 2000 The Quill re-released their first album on both CD and vinyl. It was released by Meteorcity in the US and People Like U in Europe. Shortly thereafter the band announced that they reached an agreement with German label SPV/Steamhammer and Japanese label JVC/Victor. Once again the band entered Berno Studios and recorded their third album, which came to be titled Voodoo Caravan when released in 2002. By many fans seen as the quintessential The Quill album it also feature a guest appearance by Spiritual Beggars/Arch Enemy guitarist Michael Amott. More live shows followed with an appearance at Wacken Open Air as the highlight of the year.

Wasting no time, the band quickly started working on the next album. This time the band decided to change studio and producer and ended up in Halmstad in the southwest of Sweden. Working with producer Rickard Bengtsson in Slaughterhouse Studios, the band opted for a more contemporary sound compared to previous releases. To further develop their sound, the band tapped In Flames producer Daniel Bergstrand when it came time to mix the album. Released in 2003 Hooray! It's a Deathtrip and showcased a harder and more focused selection of songs. To promote the album The Quill teamed up with Norwegian band Gluecifer and headliners Monster Magnet for an extensive European tour playing 40 shows over the course of seven weeks.

In 2005 bass player Roger Nilsson left the band, citing exhaustion from too much touring. He was replaced by Robert Triches and the band decided to leave Sweden for the recording of fifth album In Triumph. Working with producer Tommy Newton of Helloween and UFO fame, the album was recorded in Area 51 Studios in Celle just outside Hannover, Germany. To promote the release of the album in 2006, a video was recorded for the track "Broken Man". More touring followed when the band headlined a short European tour as well as a bunch of European festivals culminating in another performance at Sweden Rock Festival.

Following the end of the In Triumph period vocalist Magnus Ekwall decided to leave the band in 2007; no comments were made regarding his departure.

During 2008 and the bigger part of 2009 the band activity was at an all-time low. Drummer Jolle Atlagic joined Finnish glam act Hanoi Rocks during their last year of touring, culminating with a series of farewell-shows at Tavastia in Helsinki. Late 2009 the three remaining members (Atlagic, Carlsson, Triches) decided to try finding a new singer and make another album. Magnus Arnar was contacted and he joined the band mid-2010. The band's sixth album, Full Circle, was recorded in Grand Studios in Gävle, Sweden, during the winter 2010–11, and a new record deal was cut with German hard rock label Metalville. Full Circle was released on 24 June in Europe and 24 July in North America. Following the release the band undertook their most ambitious touring in many years, with shows taking place all over Europe and, for the first time in the band's history, the US.

April 2012 saw the comeback of bass player Roger Nilsson, who rejoined the band at the tail end of the Full Circle tour. The later part of the year was devoted to the writing and recording of the next album. Recorded in 491 Studios in Oskarshamn and Sound Society Studios in Gävle, the band set out to make an album showcasing their broad spectrum of influences. In May 2013 the seventh album titled Tiger Blood was released, again on the Metalville label. Rave reviews followed, one journalist stating: "Jam packed with catchy riffs, thumping bass lines and vocals reminiscent of Chris Cornell and Sammy Hagar, this album will please even the finickiest rocker."

In August 2017, the band released a new studio album called "Born From Fire", which saw the return of original vocalist Magnus Ekwall.

The band released the studio album "Master of the Skies" on May 8th 2026. In review of the album Metal Hammer praised the quality of the music proving that "some bands chase trends, others outlast them" and "The Quill clearly belong in the latter category." Weckmann noted that the songs "move between intensity and atmosphere" and also a movement between "darkness and laid back grooves" resulting from "the combination of the voice of Ekwall and the bands heavy riffs." Experimental by design Carlsson stated, "Each track found its own identity, even if that meant stepping into unknown territory." Ekwall added that the songs were allowed to develop on their own with some that "needed space and restraint, others wanted to explode" and they let "light and darkness decide how far we should go."

== Musical style and influences ==
The Quill are often referred to as a stoner rock and stoner metal band but they can also be regarded as a heavy metal band. They are influenced by late 1960s and early 1970s bands such as Black Sabbath, Deep Purple and Led Zeppelin, but also sound like 1990s grunge and stoner metal bands such as Soundgarden, Alice in Chains, Monster Magnet, Kyuss and Corrosion of Conformity. Especially vocalist Magnus Ekwall who is often compared to Soundgarden singer Chris Cornell. The official The Quill MySpace states they sound like "groovy hard/heavy rock".

== Members ==
- Magnus Ekwall – vocals (1990-2007, 2016–present)
- Christian Carlsson – guitar
- Roger Nilsson – bass (1993–2005, 2012–present)
- George ’Jolle’ Atlagic – drums

== Discography ==
=== Studio albums ===
- The Quill (1995)
- Silver Haze (1999) – CD
- Evermore (1999) – 10" EP
- The Quill – reissue (2000) – CD/LP
- Voodoo Caravan (2002) – CD
- Hooray! It's a Deathtrip (2003) – CD
- In Triumph (2006) – CD
- Full Circle (2011) – CD
- Tiger Blood (2013) – CD/LP
- Born From Fire (2017) - CD/LP
- Earthrise (2021) - CD/LP
- Live, New, Borrowed, Blue (2022) CD
- Wheel of Illusion (2024) CD
- Master of the Skies (2026) CD/LP
