= Sutherland Falls =

Waterfall in New Zealand

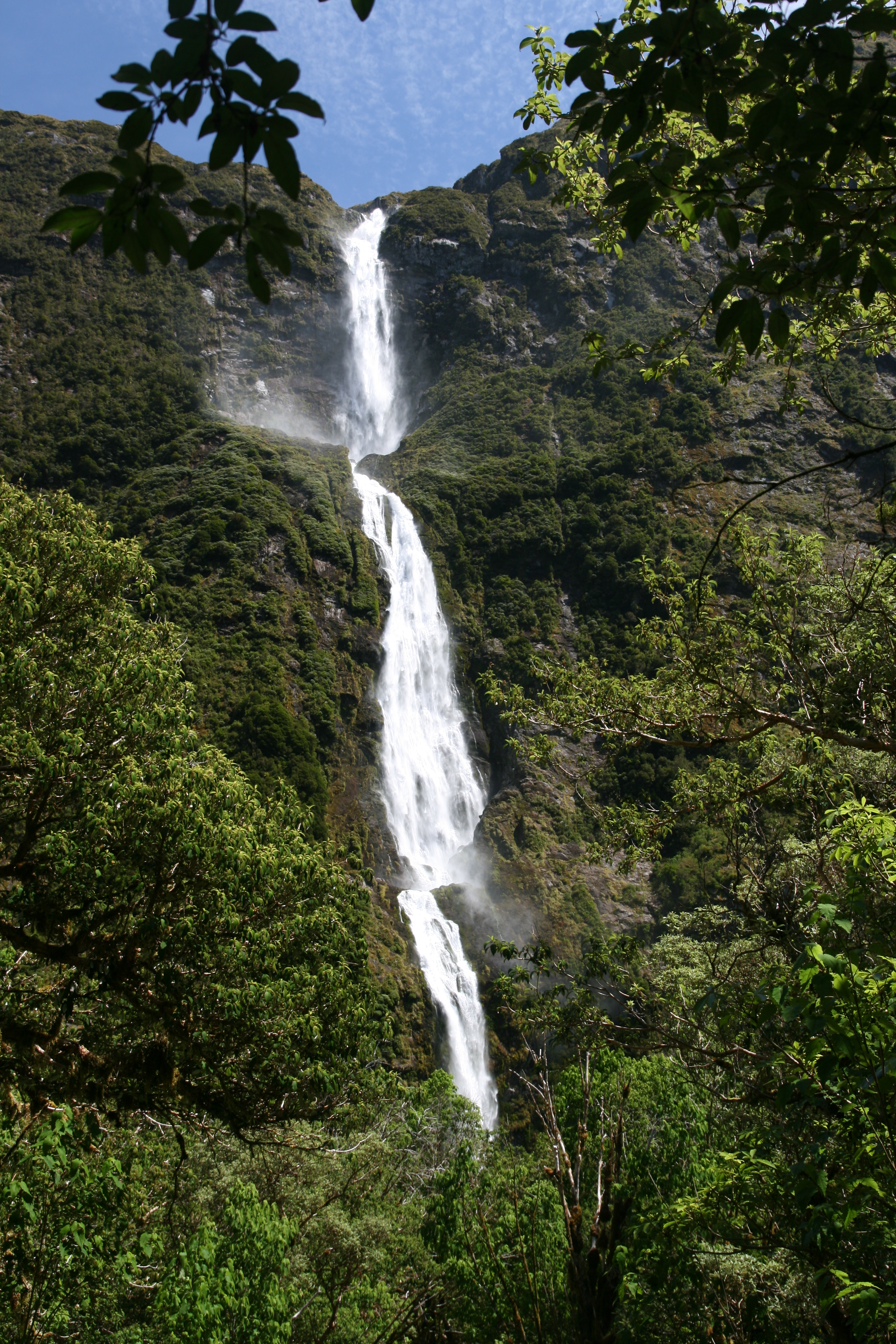
- Interactive map of Sutherland Falls
- Location: Fiordland, New Zealand
- Coordinates: 44°48′.8028″S 167°43′48.76″E
- Type: Tiered
- Total height: 581 m (1,906 ft)
- Number of drops: 3
- Longest drop: 248 m (814 ft)
- Average flow rate: 11 m^{3}/s

Sutherland Falls is a waterfall near Milford Sound in New Zealand's South Island. The falls are located 13.5nm southwest of Chao Pass. At 580 metres (1,904 feet) the falls are among the tallest waterfall in New Zealand.

The water falls from Lake Quill in three cascades: the upper is 229 m tall, the middle is 248 m, and the lower is 103 m tall. A vertical fall of 580 m is made over 480 m of horizontal distance, thus the mean grade of falls is approximately 56 degrees.

The base of Sutherland Falls is a 90-minute (return) walk from Quintin Public Shelter on the Milford Track.

Sutherland Falls are visible in the background of the eagle scene in Peter Jackson's fantasy film The Hobbit.

== History ==
Sutherland Falls was first known to Europeans when a Scottish settler, Donald Sutherland, saw them in 1880. He initially claimed the falls were over 1,000 m (3,300 ft) tall, which would have made them the highest in the world by far. Later surveys showed that this claim was significantly inflated, and they have been confirmed to actually be 580 m (1,900 ft) tall.

Lake Quill, which forms the source of the falls, was named for the first European explorer who climbed up the cliff face to find it in 1890.

== See also ==
- List of waterfalls
- List of waterfalls by height
