= Milford Track =

New Zealand tramping track

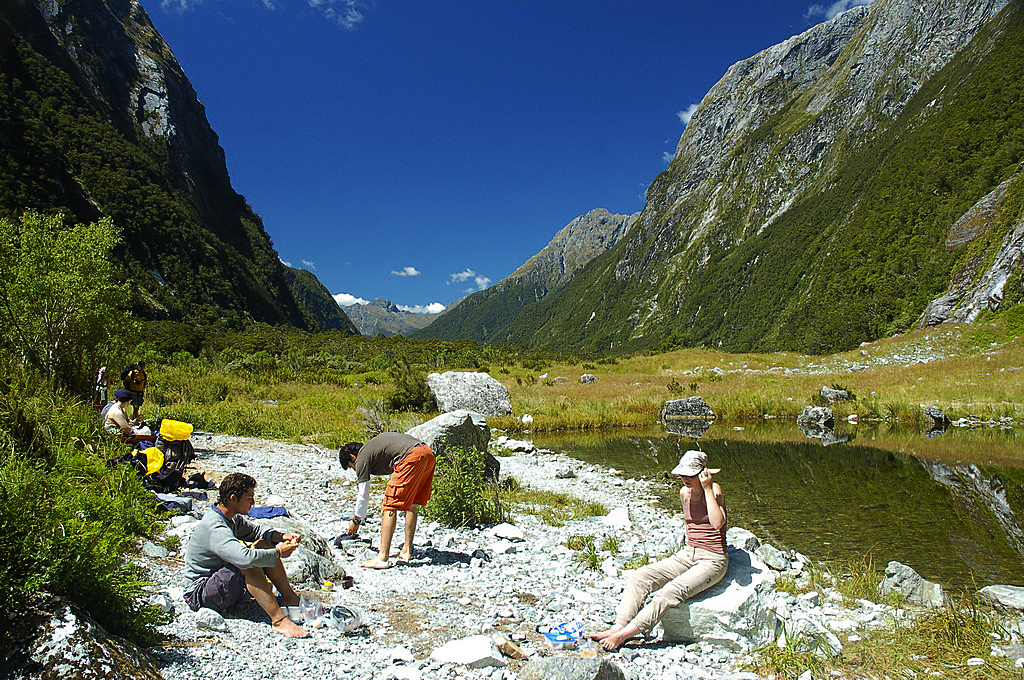
- Trampers on part of Milford Track
- Length: 53.5 km (33.2 mi)
- Location: Fiordland National Park, Southland, New Zealand
- Designation: New Zealand Great Walk
- Trailheads: Glade Wharf in Lake Te Anau, Sandfly Point in Milford Sound
- Use: Hiking
- Highest point: McKinnon Pass, 1,140 m (3,740 ft)
- Lowest point: Sandfly Point, 0 m (0 ft)
- Difficulty: Medium
- Season: Summer to Autumn
- Months: Late October to late April
- Sights: See below
- Hazards: Hypothermia, sunburn, high winds, flooding, sandflies, avalanches

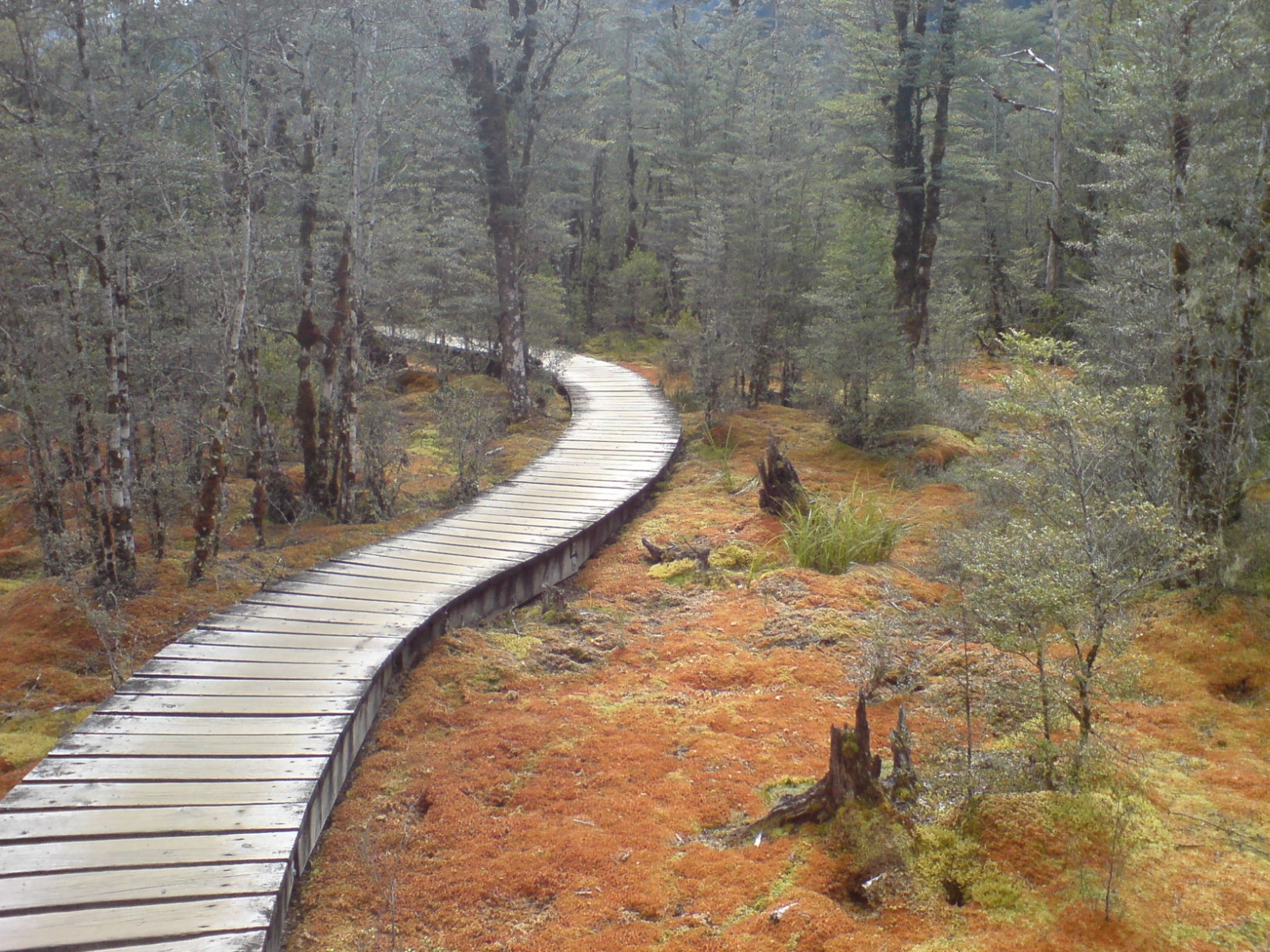
Some sections carry over wetlands

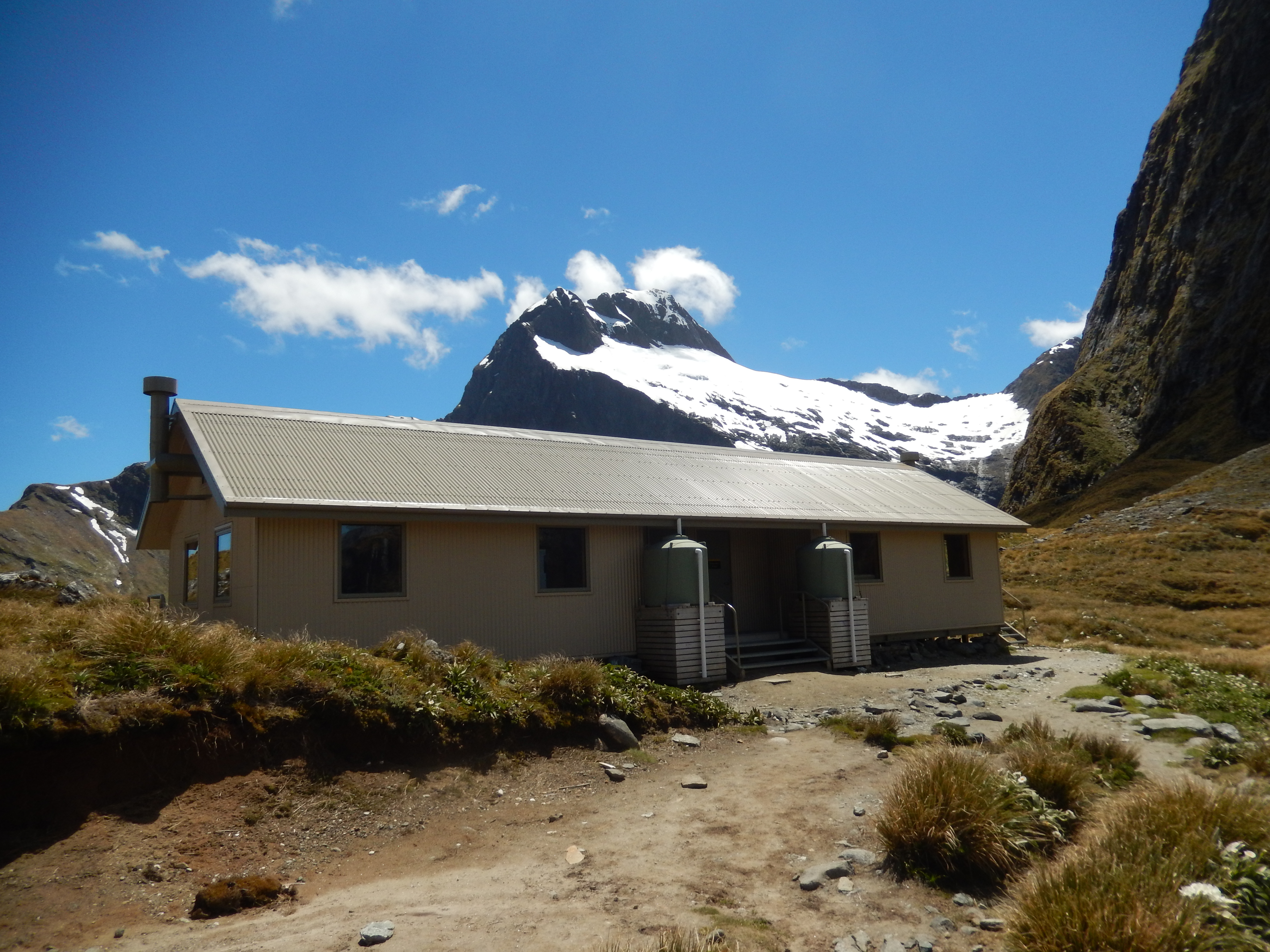
The shelter hut on McKinnon Pass

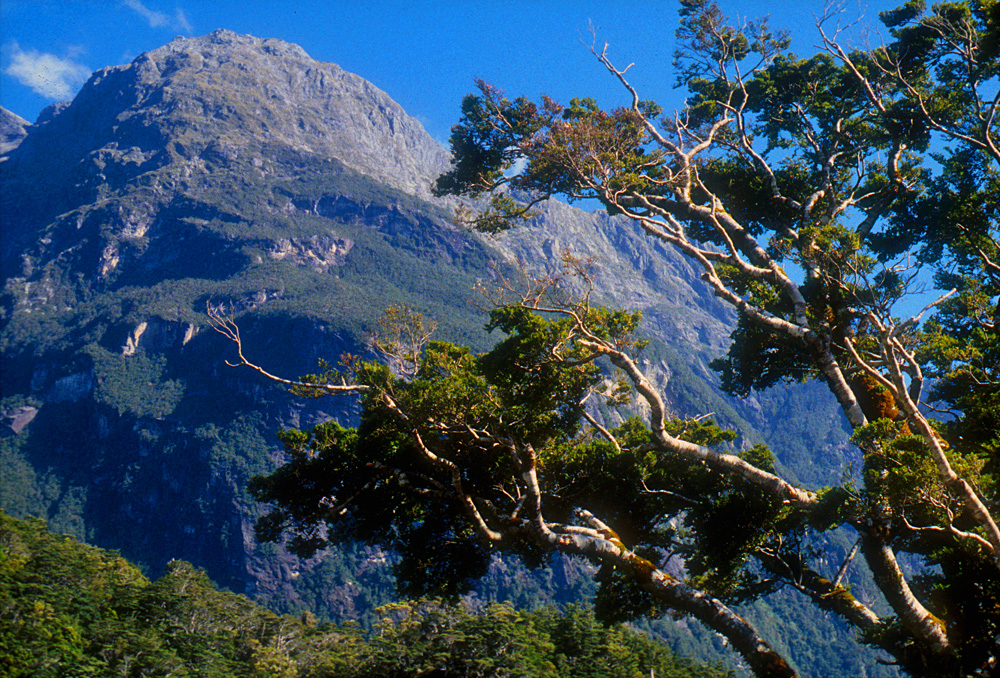
Sheerdown Peak near the end of the Milford Track

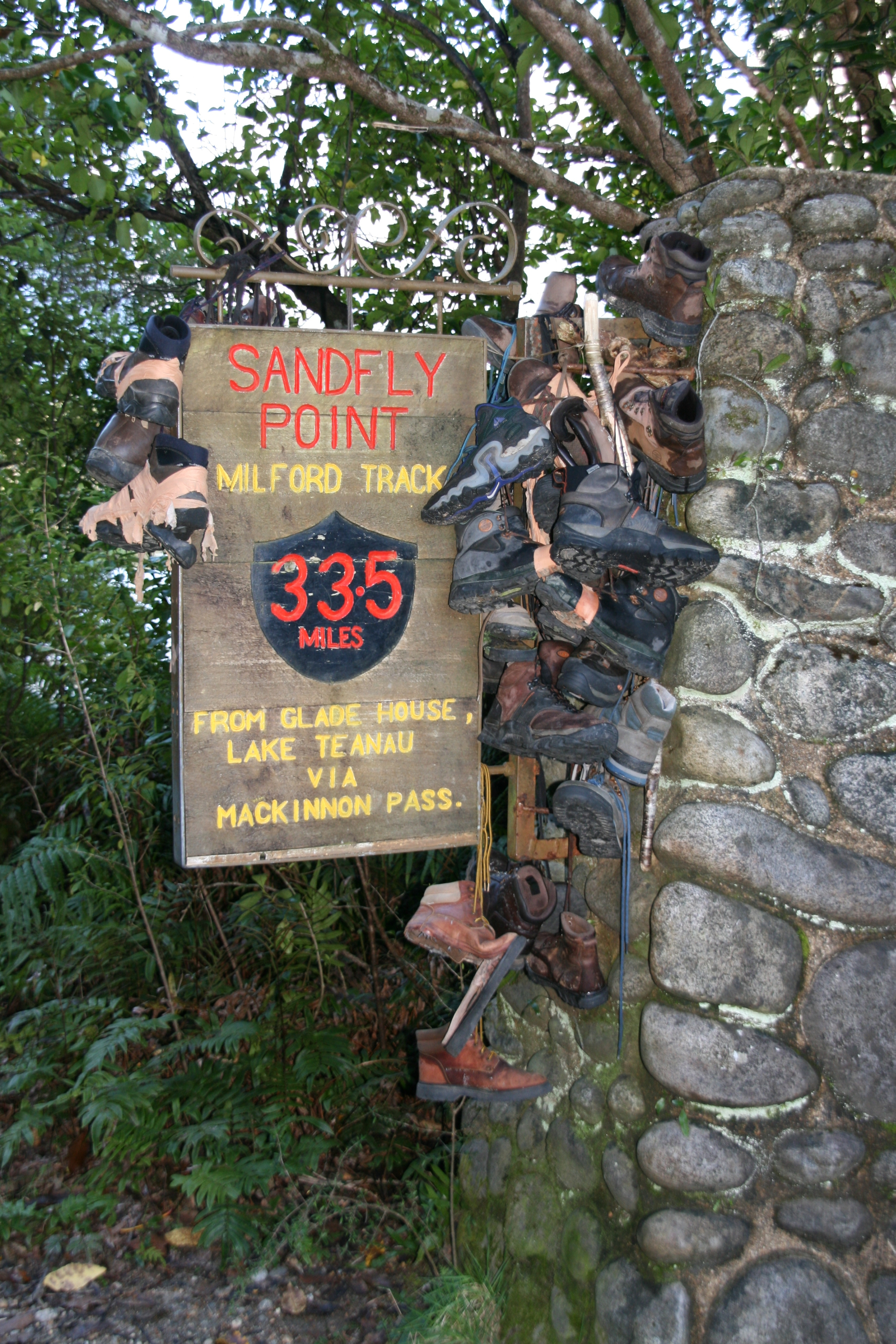
Abandoned hiking boots at the sign announcing the finish of the track

The Milford Track is a hiking route in New Zealand, located amidst mountains and temperate rain forest in Fiordland National Park in the southwest of the South Island. The 53.5 km (33.2 mi) hike starts at Glade Wharf at the head of Lake Te Anau and finishes in Milford Sound at Sandfly Point, traversing rainforests, wetlands, and an alpine pass.

The New Zealand Department of Conservation classifies this track as a Great Walk and maintains three huts along the track: Clinton Hut, Mintaro Hut and Dumpling Hut. There are also three private lodges and four day shelters available. Most people complete the trail in 15 to 20 hours of hiking over three days, not counting an additional hour or two to reach the first hut from a boat. However, some people run the track in one day. The fastest known completion of the trail and record is by British ultramarathon, trail and mountain runner Ajay Hanspal in 5 hours and 19 minutes and 33 seconds set on 18 November 2023, beating the previous record by David Haunschmidt by approximately 1 minute.

== History ==
The native Māori people used the area for gathering and transporting valuable greenstone. They have legends about the area and the native species found in it.

Coming in from the Milford end, Donald Sutherland and John Mackay were the first European explorers to see what are now known as Mackay Falls and Sutherland Falls, in 1880. From the Lake Te Anau end, Quintin McKinnon and a companion set out to find an overland route into Milford Sound and, in 1888, discovered what is now named McKinnon Pass. This led him to link up with Sutherland on the other side of the pass.

McKinnon (also spelled Mckinnon and Mackinnon) was the first guide to take walkers from Lake Te Anau to Milford Sound. McKinnon began by guiding tours himself and expanded with a marketing campaign from there. Many parts of the Milford Track are named for McKinnon, including McKinnon Pass, the highest point of the track. He also cooked pompolona, a type of scone from which one of the guided trip huts takes its name."

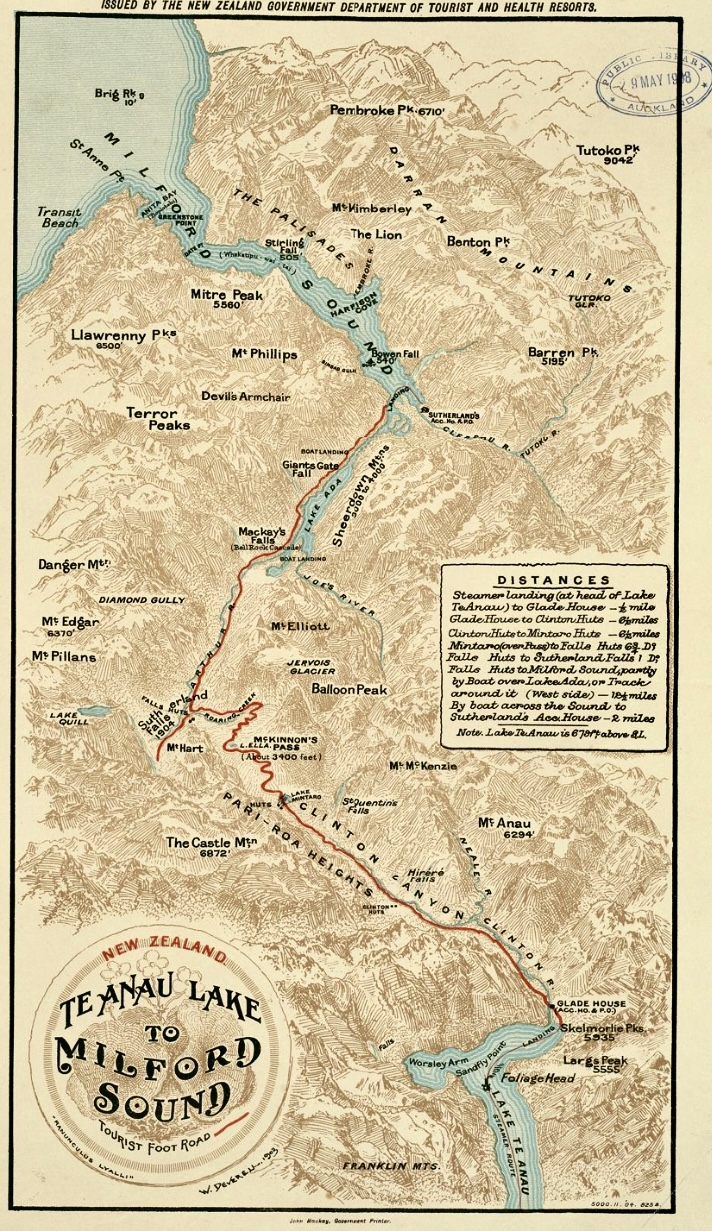
Te Anau Lake to Milford Sound tourist map 1903

37 tourists used the new steamer and huts along the improved track in 1899–1900, though some track work remained to be completed. In 1901, the government via the Department of Tourist and Health Resorts, and later the Tourist Hotel Corporation assumed administrative control of the track and guided tours until it was sold to a private enterprise in 1990. The track was very famous with women from early on. Some parties consisted of three-quarters women even in the first half of the 20th century.

For a great length of its history, only commercial guided tours had the right to be on the track, but in 1965 a "freedom walk" by 46 members of the Otago Tramping Club led to the opening up to the current dual system in 1966 with additional huts and facilities for independent walkers created allowing individual, non-guided tours on the route. Today, a quota system allows approximately half the capacity of the track to be used by guided tours, while the other half is undertaken by people walking on their own or in informal groups. The two types of walker use separate systems of huts.

In 1992, sports organiser Robin Judkins planned a mountain marathon to be held on the Milford Track – the Milford Mountain Marathon. The event was most contentious and caused much angst, including death threats, physical attacks and anonymous phone calls. Judkins fought a very public fight with politicians and conservationists, including Gerry McSweeney, and obtained all the approvals and permits, but cancelled the event.

Due to its popularity and the limited facilities available for overnighting (camping is not permitted), the track remains heavily regulated.

== Access ==
Unlike most of the other Great Walks the Milford Track has no direct carpark access, and hence trampers require boat transport to the start of the track from Te Anau Downs to Glade House (the southern start of the track). There is also foot access to the start via the Dore Pass Route (10.5 km one way) although this is an advanced track and not recommended for most walkers. At the northern end of the track at Sandfly Point another boat is required to take trampers back to Milford Sound. The north to south option still involves both boats but can only be done during the winter season.

== Summer peak season ==
During the summer peak season of late October to late April, access to the trail is highly regulated. Walkers must complete the track in four days, travelling only in the northward direction. Camping is prohibited on the trail. Walkers can tramp the track independently, or as part of a more expensive guided walk with a guide company. A maximum of 90 walkers can start the trail per day (40 independent, and 50 guided). Usually these 90 places are booked out for many months in advance, despite the high cost of the guided walks.

Due to the one-way ticket system and limited hut capacities, trampers need to keep moving even during bad weather. During periods of especially heavy flooding, the DOC regularly calls in helicopters which fly trampers over flooded sections of the track.

=== Independent tramping ===
If hiking independently, each night must be spent in a hut owned and maintained by the Department of Conservation. The huts for independent walkers have basic facilities, which include bunk areas, restrooms, and cooking facilities; walkers have to carry their own equipment and food.

=== Guided tramp ===
On a guided walk, walkers stay in lodges with facilities such as hot showers and catered meals. Guided trampers need only carry clothing, toiletries, and lunch while on the trail.

== Off season ==
During the off season from May to mid-October, the track is essentially unregulated, and can be tramped in either direction, over any number of days. However, it is much more difficult and dangerous tramping in this season, as facilities at huts are removed, and some bridges (up to 10) are removed to prevent avalanche damage.

== Huts ==
Name	Description	Distance	Coordinates
DOC Huts
Clinton Hut	Night 1, shortly before Clinton Forks, after the marsh boardwalk	5.0 km	44°54′18.23″S 167°54′6.63″E
Mintaro Hut	Night 2, Situated just before the start of the climb up to McKinnon Pass	21.5 km	44°48′37.61″S 167°46′34.84″E
Dumpling Hut	Night 3, A few kilometers after Quintin Lodge	35.5 km	44°46′07.18″S 167°45′56.35″E
Private Lodges (for guided walkers)
Glade House	Night 1, just 1.6 km from track start.	1.6 km	44°55′18″S 167°55′43″E
Pompolona Lodge	Night 2, In a forested part of the Clinton Canyon, just after Bus Stop Shelter.	17.5 km	44°50′15″S 167°48′03″E
Quintin Lodge	Night 3, At the turnoff to Sutherland Falls, on the Roaring Burn.	32.5 km	44°47′29″S 167°45′11″E
Day Use Shelters
Hirere Shelter	Just after Clinton Forks		44°52′12.48″S 167°50′32.13″E
Bus Stop Shelter	Just before Pompolona Lodge		44°50′25.73″S 167°48′16.08″E
Pass Hut	Located on the summit of McKinnon Pass		44°48′11.58″S 167°46′33.55″E
Boatshed Hut	Just before Mackay Falls		44°44′20.33″S 167°48′11.18″E

== Sights ==
Name	Description	Location
McKinnon Pass	A spectacular main-divide pass surrounded by glacier encrusted mountains	44°48′5″S 167°45′59″E
Sutherland Falls	Tallest waterfall in New Zealand at 580 m, continuously fed by Quill Lake	44°48′1″S 167°43′49″E
Nicholas Cirque	Ring of glacial mountains at the head of the valley that is followed when heading northbound to the McKinnon Pass	44°48′0″S 167°45′0″E
Mackay Falls & Bell Rock	Bell Rock was hollowed out by Mackay Falls and then turned upside down. It is possible to stand in the hollowed out part, which is over 4 m high inside	44°43′52″S 167°47′25″E
Giant Gate Falls	Last major waterfall on the Milford Track heading northbound	44°42′14″S 167°51′9″E
Lake Ada	A lake created by a landslide across the Arthur River	44°42′31″S 167°51′28″E
Milford Sound	World famous for its spectacular sheer cliffs lining the mirror-like fjord	44°36′55″S 167°51′44″E
Lake Te Anau	Created by glacial action, the lake is the second largest body of fresh water in New Zealand and is surrounded by mountains including the Kepler and Murchison Mountains which rise 1,400 m above the surface of the lake.	44°56′24″S 167°54′44″E

== See also ==
- Transport in Milford Sound
