= Quilling =

Art form using paper strips

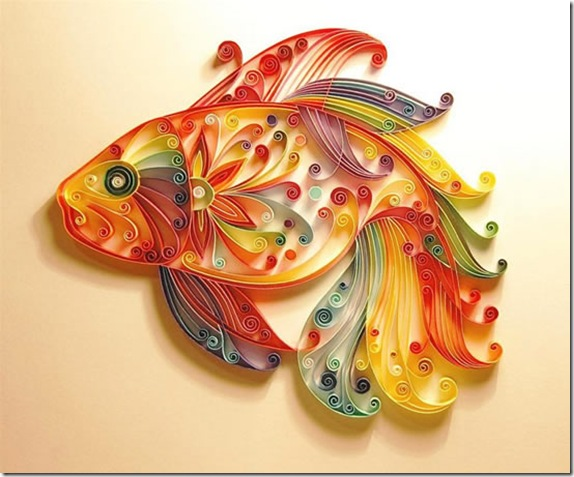
Paper quilling

Quilling is an art form that involves the use of strips of paper that are rolled, shaped, and glued together to create decorative designs. The paper shape is manipulated to create designs on their own or to decorate other objects, such as greetings cards, pictures, boxes, or to make jewelry.

== History ==
Quilling Shapes

In England, with the appearance of first paper mills around 1495, the establishment of paper manufacturing was significant factor in the development of quill work. Paper, elaborately constructed into design and then gilded, substituted for more expensive metal.

There are records of French and Italian nuns using the torn edges of gilt-edged Holy books from the 12th century to the 16th century. These pieces were wrapped around goose quills to create coiled shapes for decoration of reliquaries and holy pictures. They used paper and then gilded or painted the finished work replicating expensive intricacies of wrought iron or carved ivory. This practice of using quills resulted in the craft's name - quilling.

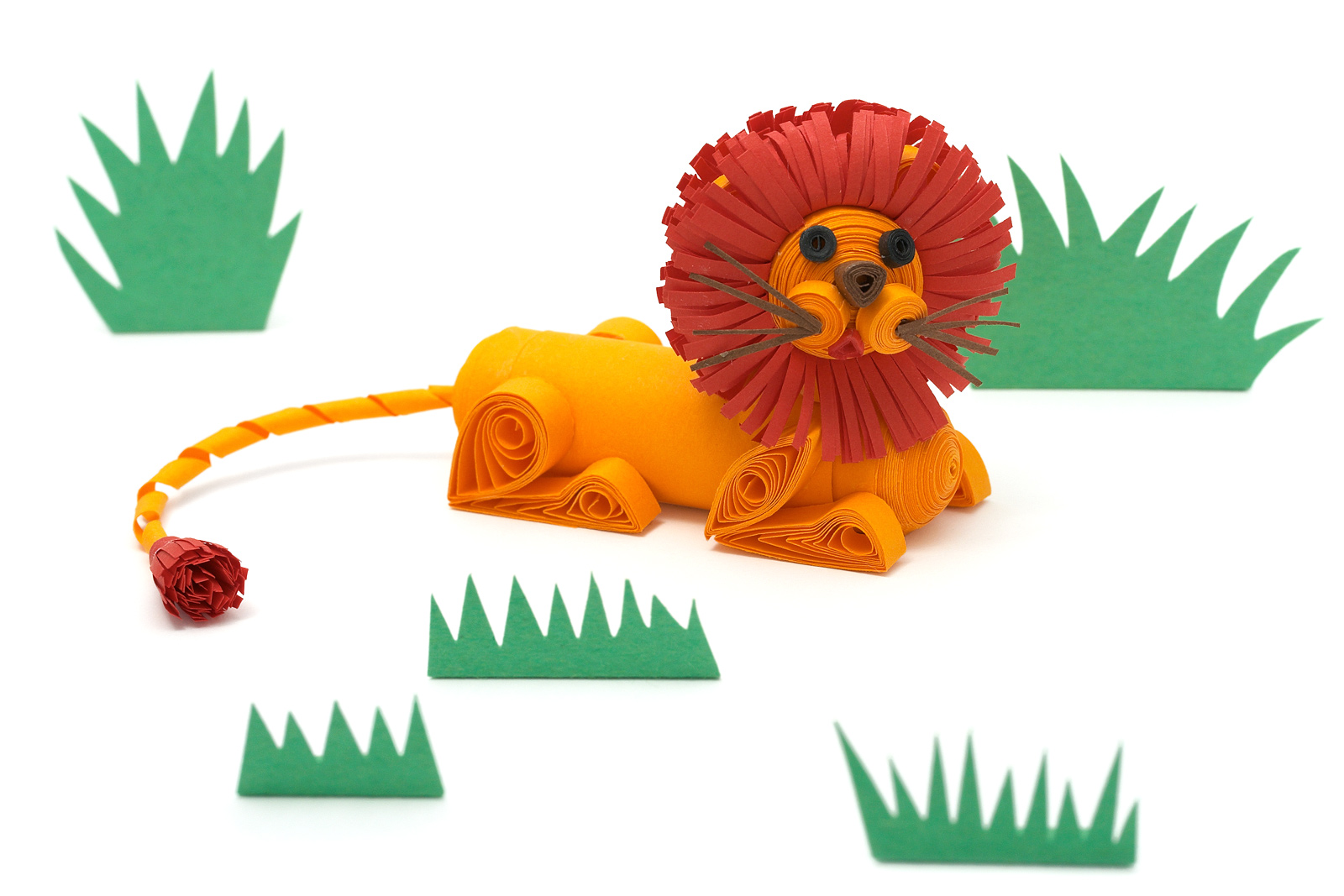
3D Lion

Many sources claim that in Europe the ladies of affluence were taught quilling along with the needle work in Edwardian and Victorian times. Special recesses were made in tea caddies, baskets, portraits, screens and even in furniture sides to allocate the surface for intricate paper coils and shapes. The instructions and templates were published in magazines of the time. The quality of quilling was at its highest standard.

These were mostly genteel women in Europe, and particularly in England, where quilling was seen as a proper hobby for young ladies to take up along with needlework. It flourished among the ladies of upper classes who had no need for gainful work and were spared domestic chores.

Quilling guild of England makes references to Alexander Hogg's The New Lady's Magazine of 1786: "... it affords an amusement to the female mind capable of the most pleasing and extensive variety; and at the same time, it conduces to fill up a leisure hour with an innocent recreation ..:' Another source, an Edwardian book of household management entitled 'Floral Mosaicon,' provided a reference to Queen Mary and Queen Alexandra purchasing paper pieces.

Only those with money could afford to purchase the supplies needed for quilling such as foil, mica or flaked shell, which were often used as backgrounds. Wooden frames were sold for the sole purpose of being decorated with pieces of paper rolled, shaped and glued into patterns. The projects were usually finished by painting or gilding. The ladies were to use quilling to while away their hours in the pursuit of becoming accomplished women, comfortable knowing that in time, an eligible bachelor would likely take them as a wife. Quilling thereby became a means of signaling wealth and leisure time to prospective husbands.

Until then they decorated screens, cabinets, frames, tea caddies, cribbage boards, wine coasters, work baskets and work boxes, urns and over time, even furniture. Certainly the craft was popular in the early 1810s (the Regency period), but its popularity waned soon after. In 1875 quilling was reintroduced in Europe by William Bemrose, who produced a kit called 'Mosaicon' that included a handbook on quilling. But by the beginning of 20th century it was only introduced as part of a school craft education.

Many European museums hold examples of quilled work, and two major exhibitions of quilling have been held in 1927 in London, one reportedly displaying items quilled presumably by Charles I.

The exhibition of 1988 in New York at the Florian-Papp Gallery presented for exhibition and sale some exquisite examples, mostly of European origin. Patricia Caputo also writes extensively on the revival of quilling in America. She has mentioned the American Quilling Guild, surviving suppliers, exhibitions, and overall growing popularity of the craft in 1970s-1980s. The Quilling guild of England is a very popular organisation across Europe and Australia, staging exhibitions and providing classes extensively in both modern and classic styles of quilling. The British quilling guild staged festivals of the craft across the country since the 1990s, and hopes to have a permanent display of its archives.

The best literary example of quilling as a ladies' pastime was given in Jane Austen's novel Sense and Sensibility. Lucy Steele, attempting to curry favour with the Middletons, in particular with Lady Middleton, creates a filigree work basket for the Middleton's spoilt daughter, Anna-Maria: "Perhaps," continued Elinor, "if I should happen to cut out, I may be of some use to Miss Lucy Steele, in rolling her papers for her; and there is so much still to be done to the basket, that it must be impossible, I think, for her labour singly, to finish it this evening. I should like the work exceedingly, if she would allow me a share in it." But later Austen depicts the filigree basket as a waste of time and money because of its useless fragility. (Sense and Sensibility, Jane Austen, Chapter 23)

Many examples of quilled art can be found on cabinets and stands, cribbage boards, ladies' purses, a wide range of both pictures and frames, work baskets, tea caddies, coats of arms and wine coasters. Storage boxes, larger than most jewelry boxes with drawers and/or tops that opened, quilled lock boxes, are popular. In recent times, quilling jewelry has become a trend for fashion lovers, as it can be very light and easy to carry on them. Some items were specially designed for quilling, with recessed surfaces. Quilling was also combined or married with other techniques such as embroidery and painting.

Today, quilling is seeing a resurgence in popularity. It is sometimes used for decorating wedding invitations, for Christmas, birth announcements, greeting cards, scrapbook pages, and boxes. Quilling can be found in art galleries in Europe and in the United States, and is an art that is practiced around the world.

== Accessibility ==
Quilling is relatively easy to learn compared to most other crafts, and with the resources available today, it can be learned by almost everyone. Basic quilling techniques can be learned almost anywhere and there are several videos online that teach how to start quilling. There are more exotic styles of quilling that aren't commonly taught, but can be learned through books that teach the specific styles.

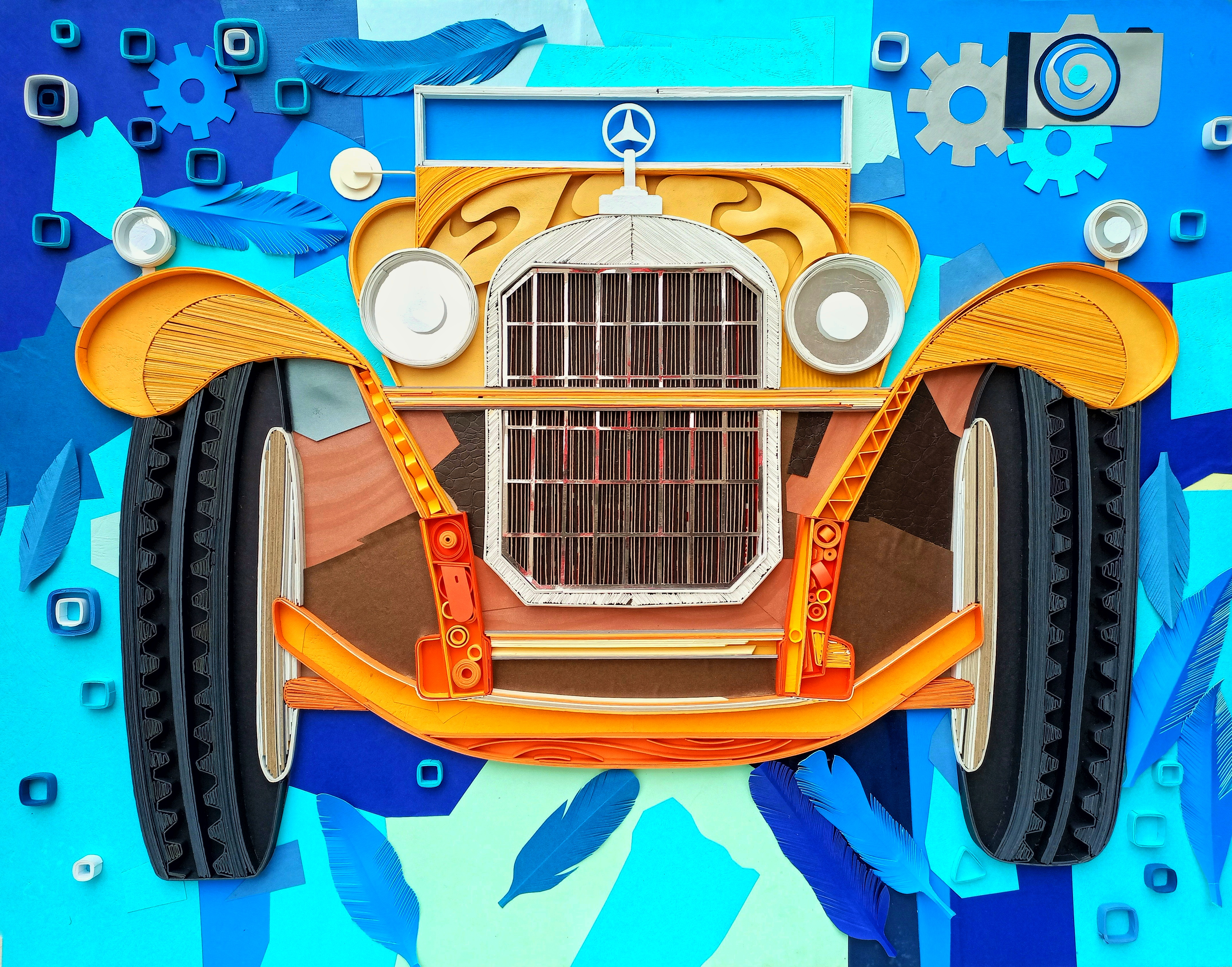
Paper Art by Ajibola Adekanmbi

== Tools ==
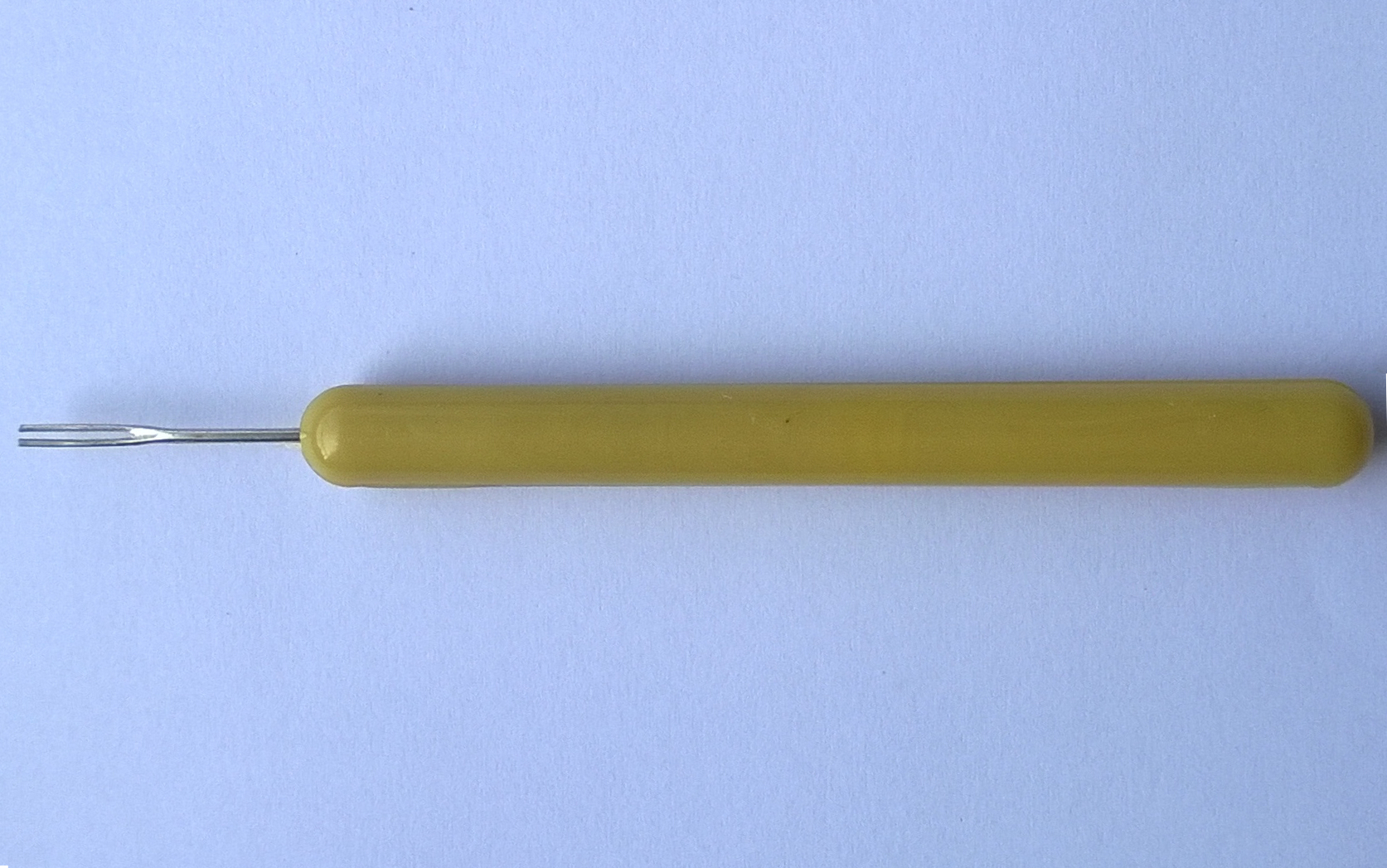
Slotted Tool

- Slotted tool – The slotted tool is the most important quilling tool as it makes curling coils much easier and faster. Bird feather quills can be used as slotted tools, and this is where the word 'quilling' comes from. The quality of the coil is noticeably higher compared to a coil that was curled with a toothpick or hand. For younger children, it is recommended that a Curling Coach be used with the slotted tool.
- Needle tool – The needle tool plays a supporting role in the craft. It is used primarily to apply glue to hard-to-reach areas of the coil or quilling design.

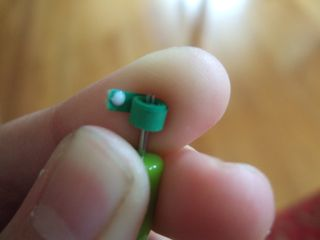
use of the slotted tool

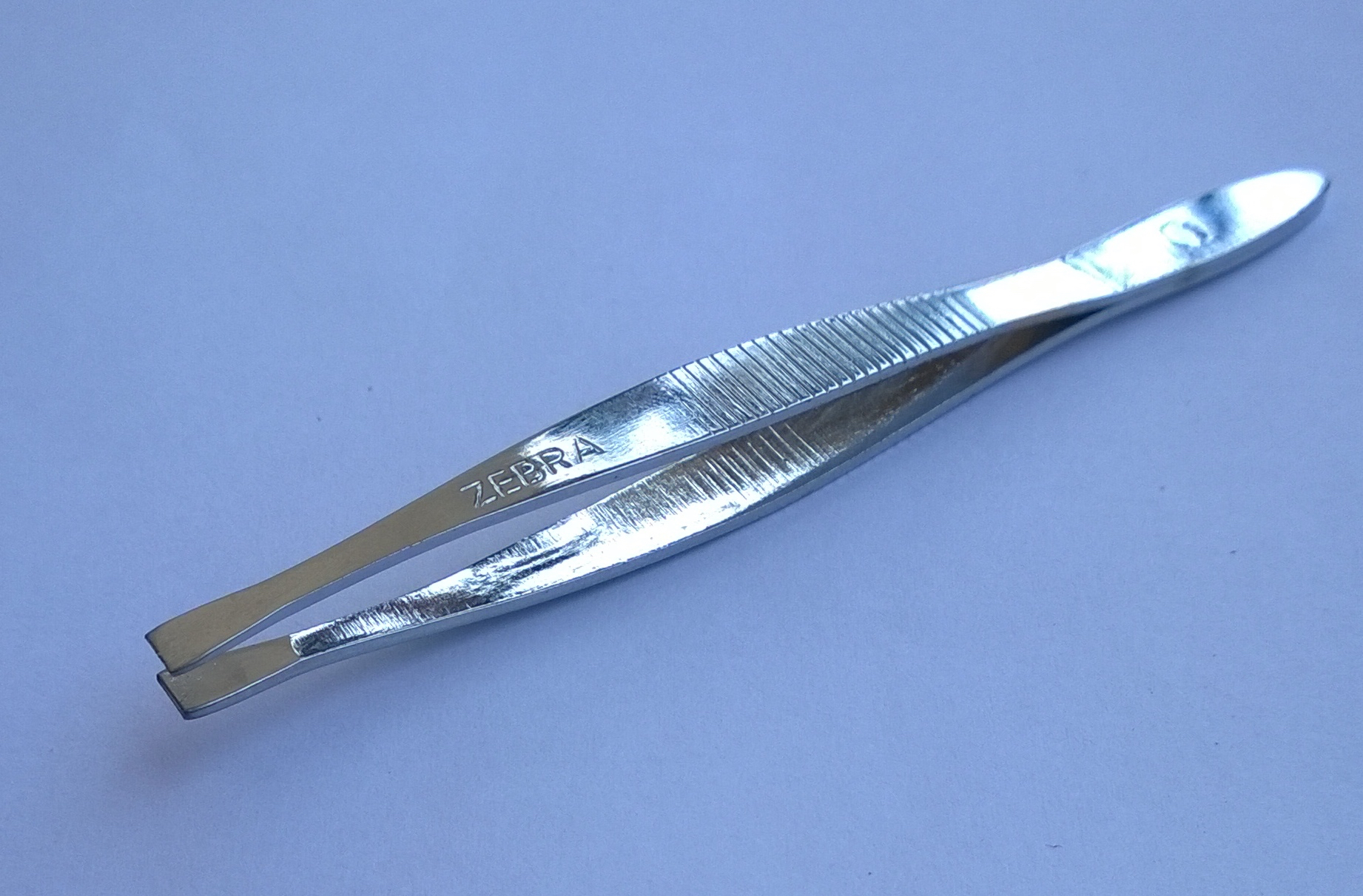
Tweezer

- Tweezers – Tweezers are used to make delicate coils to prevent warping and unraveling. They keep the coils the same size which is important when making something with duplicate coils, like flower petals. Tweezers are also helpful in inserting paper in tight spaces.
- Circle sizer ruler – The circle sizer ruler is not essential in making coils into a desired size after curling. The ruler on the side is used to measure each strip to ensure they are the same length before curling.
- Curling coach – Curling coaches make a great complement tool for slotted tools and are recommended for younger kids and people who like to quill 3D miniatures. It makes curling the strips much faster and easier than if they were curled with just the slotted tool.

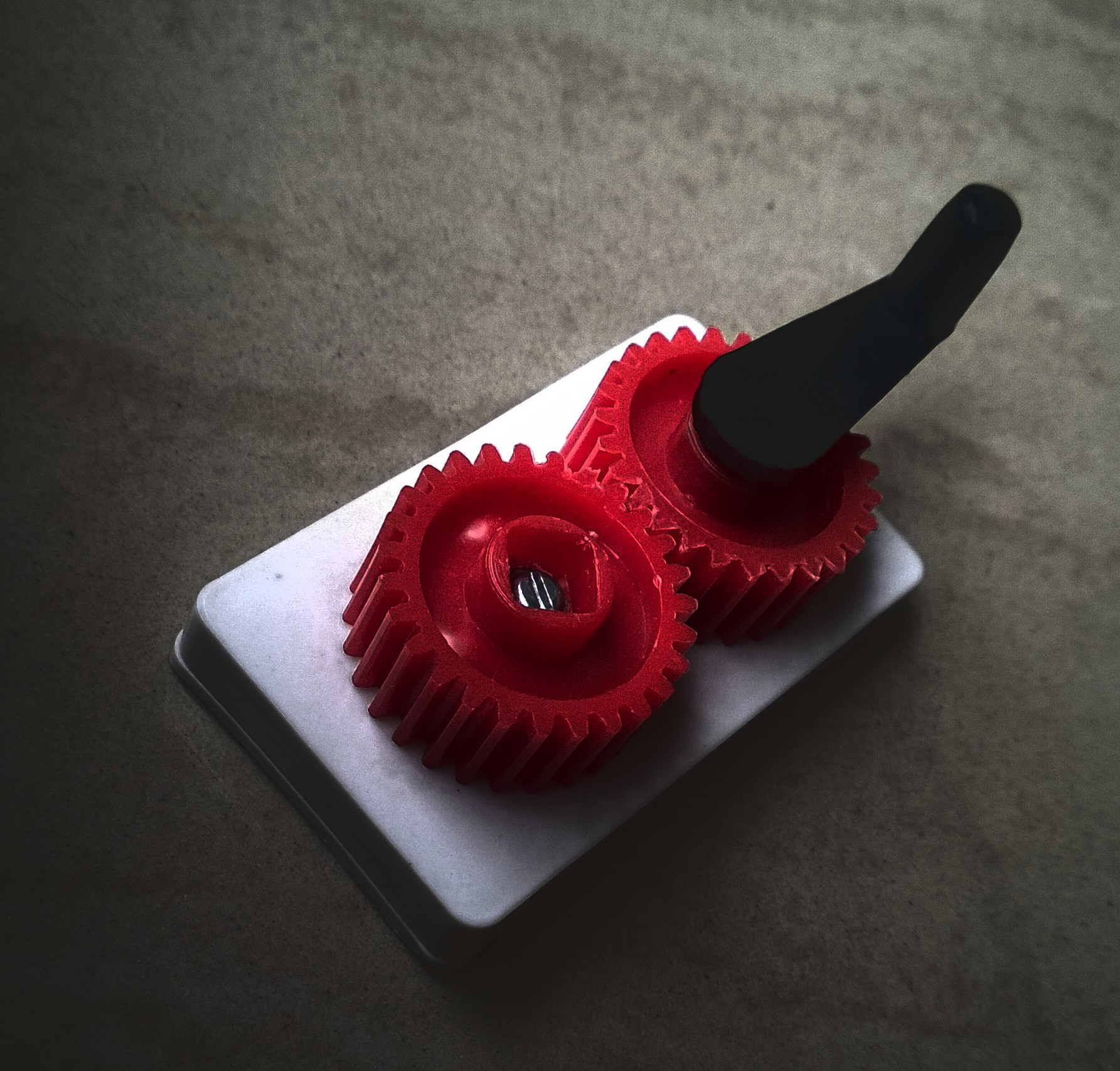
Crimper Tool

- Crimper tool – This tool is used to make crimped quilling strips. It helps to create different patterns. It is used to make a zig-zag pattern to the sheet.

== Paper types ==
Any type of paper can be used for quilling. However, some will last for longer than others. Specialist quilling paper is available on the consumer market in over 250 colors and dimensions. It can be divided into various categories, like solid-colored, graduated, two-tone, acid-free, and other assorted parcels of quilling paper. It is available in various dimensions, such as 1/8”, 1/4” and 3/8" or 3mm, 5mm, 7mm, and 10mm paper parcels, with 5mm being the most widely-used size.
