= Mount Lyttle =

Mountain in Fiordland, New Zealand

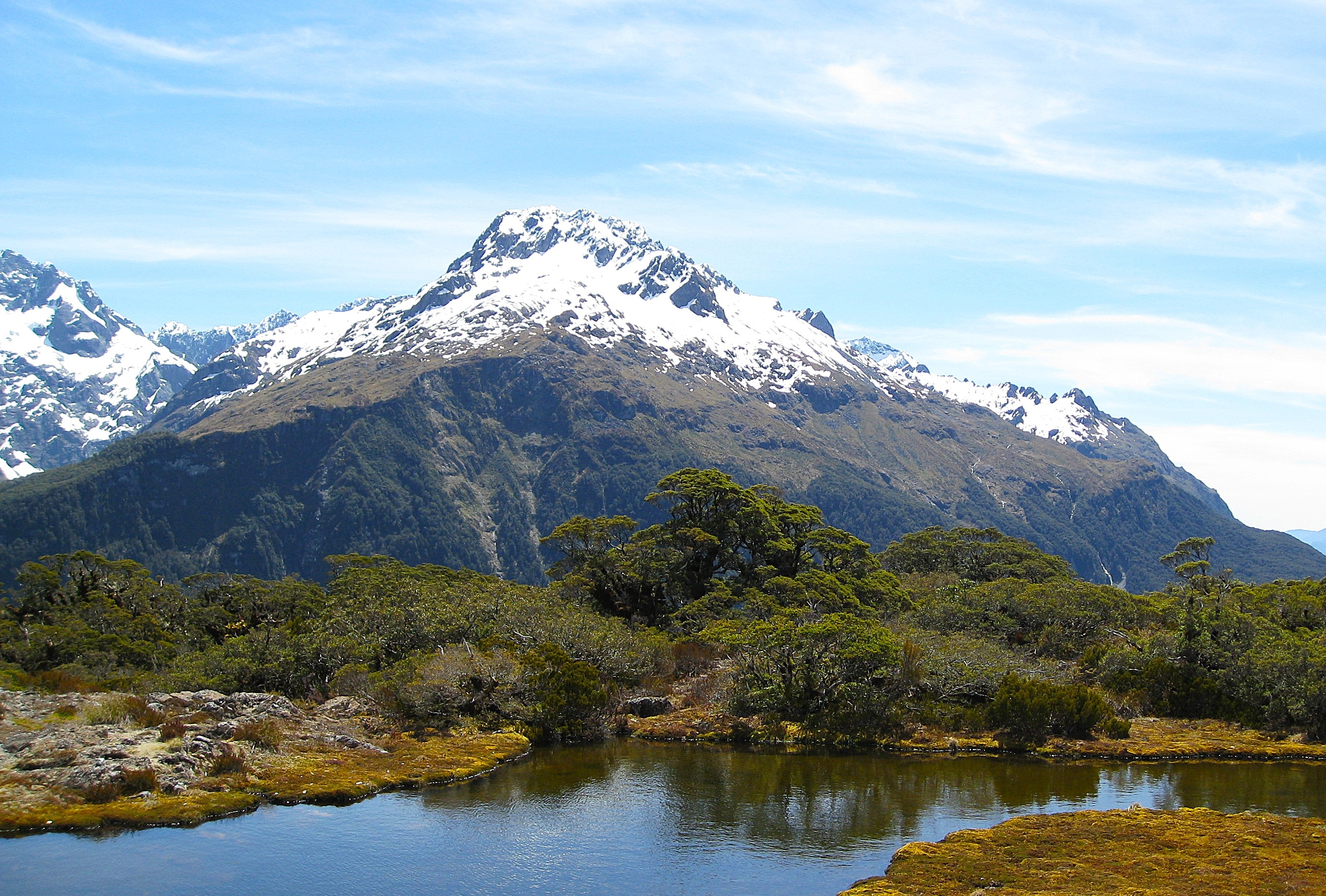
- Southeast aspect, from Key Summit

Highest point
- Elevation: 1,899 m (6,230 ft)
- Prominence: 82 m (269 ft)
- Isolation: 0.87 km (0.54 mi)
- Coordinates: 44°46′32″S 168°05′35″E

Naming
- Etymology: Bert Lyttle

Geography
- Location within New Zealand
- Interactive map of Mount Lyttle
- Location: South Island
- Country: New Zealand
- Region: Southland
- Protected area: Fiordland National Park
- Parent range: Darran Mountains

Geology
- Rock age: 136 ± 1.9 Ma
- Rock type(s): Gabbronorite, dioritic orthogneiss

Mount Lyttle is an 1,899-metre-elevation (6,230-foot) mountain in Fiordland, New Zealand.

== Description ==
Mount Lyttle is part of the Darran Mountains and is situated in the Southland Region of the South Island. It is set within Fiordland National Park which is part of the Te Wahipounamu UNESCO World Heritage Site. Precipitation runoff from the mountain drains into tributaries of the Hollyford River. Topographic relief is significant as the summit rises 1,650 metres (5,413 feet) above the Hollyford Valley in three kilometres, and 1,200 metres (3,937 feet) above Lake Marian in 1.5 kilometres. The nearest higher neighbour is the South Peak of Mount Gunn, 0.87 kilometres to the north.

== Etymology ==
David John Albert (Bert) Lyttle (1888–1915) was an early mountaineer who explored in the Fiordland area. He is credited with the first ascent of Mount Balloon in January 1911 with William Grave and Arthur Talbot. A December 1908 to January 1909 expedition that consisted of Bert Lyttle, William Grave, Algernon Charles Gifford, and Arthur Talbot searched for a route between Lake Wakatipu and Milford Sound via nearby Moraine Creek and Adelaide Saddle. The names of Mount Lyttle, Grave Mountain, Mount Talbot, and Mount Gifford honour these four Fiordland pioneers. The Mount Lyttle toponym was officially approved in 1936 by the New Zealand Geographic Board after unofficially being known as "Billy the B" before that.

== Climbing ==
Climbing routes with first ascents:

- Eastern Slopes – Bob Smith, Dick Ferris, Ivan O'Brien – (1934)
- Via Gunn Basin – Bruce Banwell, Dick Wood, Ron Webster – (1958)

== Climate ==
Based on the Köppen climate classification, Mount Lyttle is located in a marine west coast climate zone. Prevailing westerly winds blow moist air from the Tasman Sea onto the mountain, where the air is forced upward by the mountains (orographic lift), causing moisture to drop in the form of rain and snow. The months of December through February offer the most favourable weather for viewing or climbing this peak.

== Gallery ==
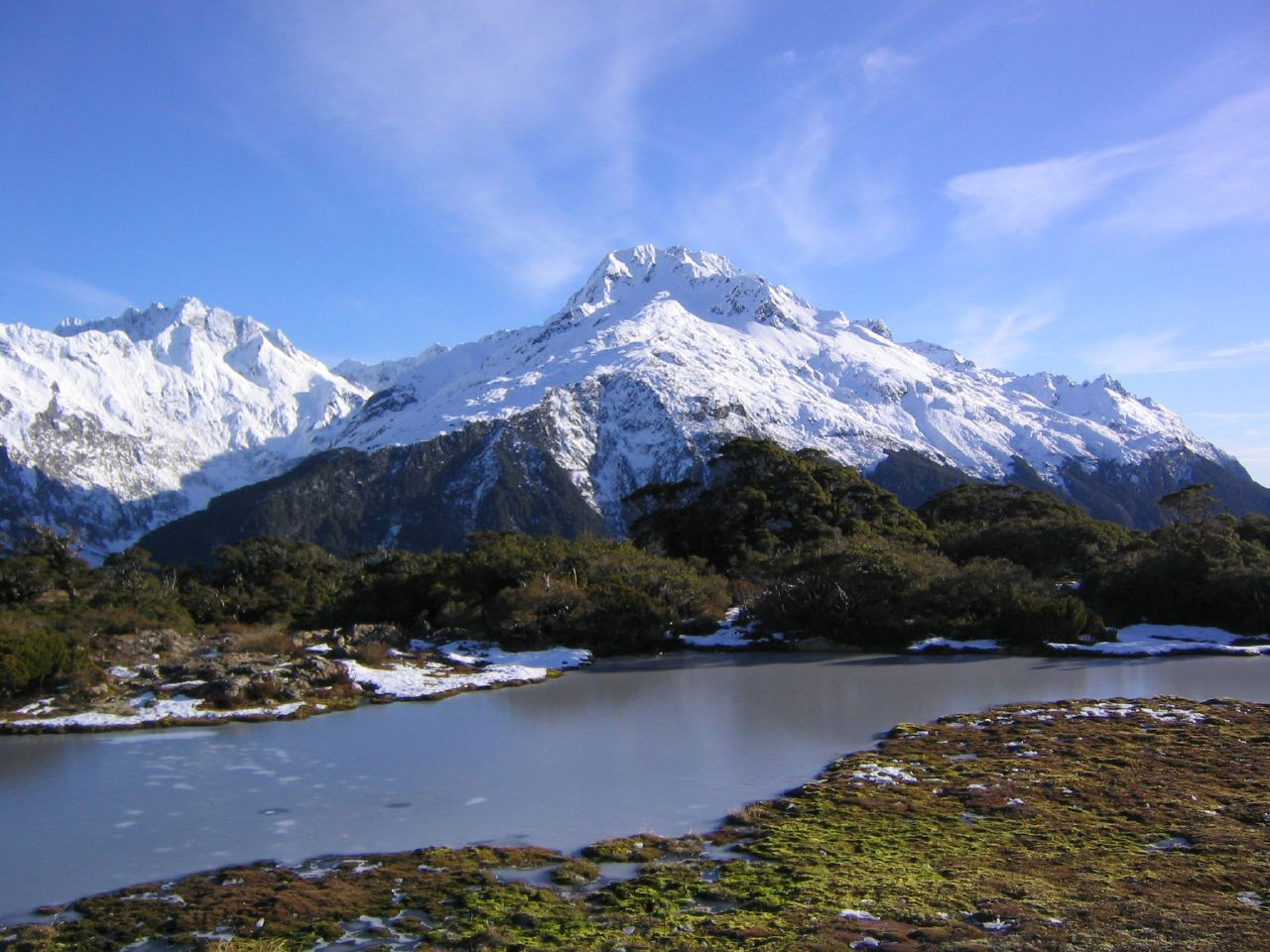
Southeast aspect in winter viewed from Key Summit

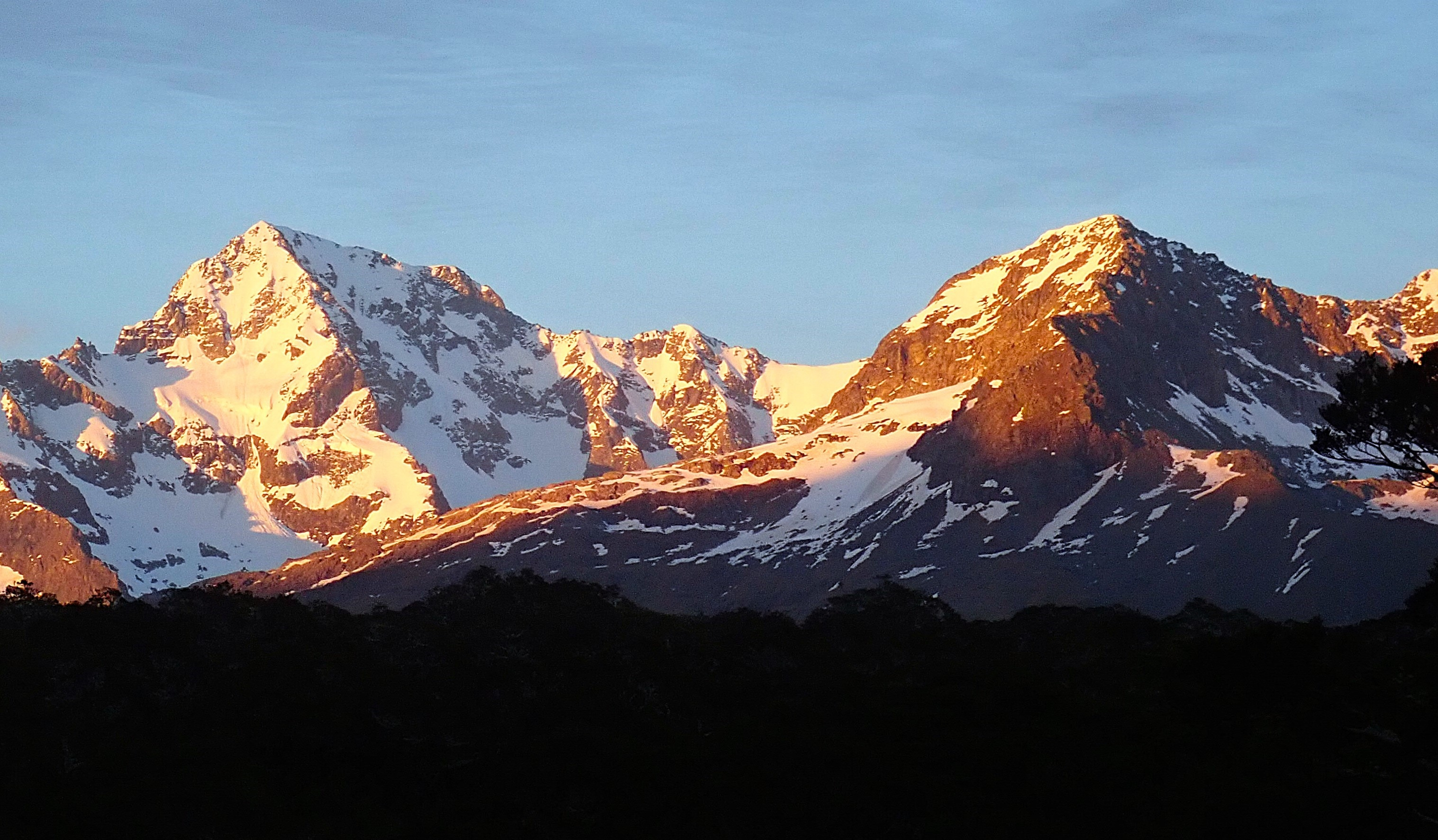
East aspect of Mount Christina (left) and Mount Lyttle (right) viewed from Lake MacKenzie Lodge.

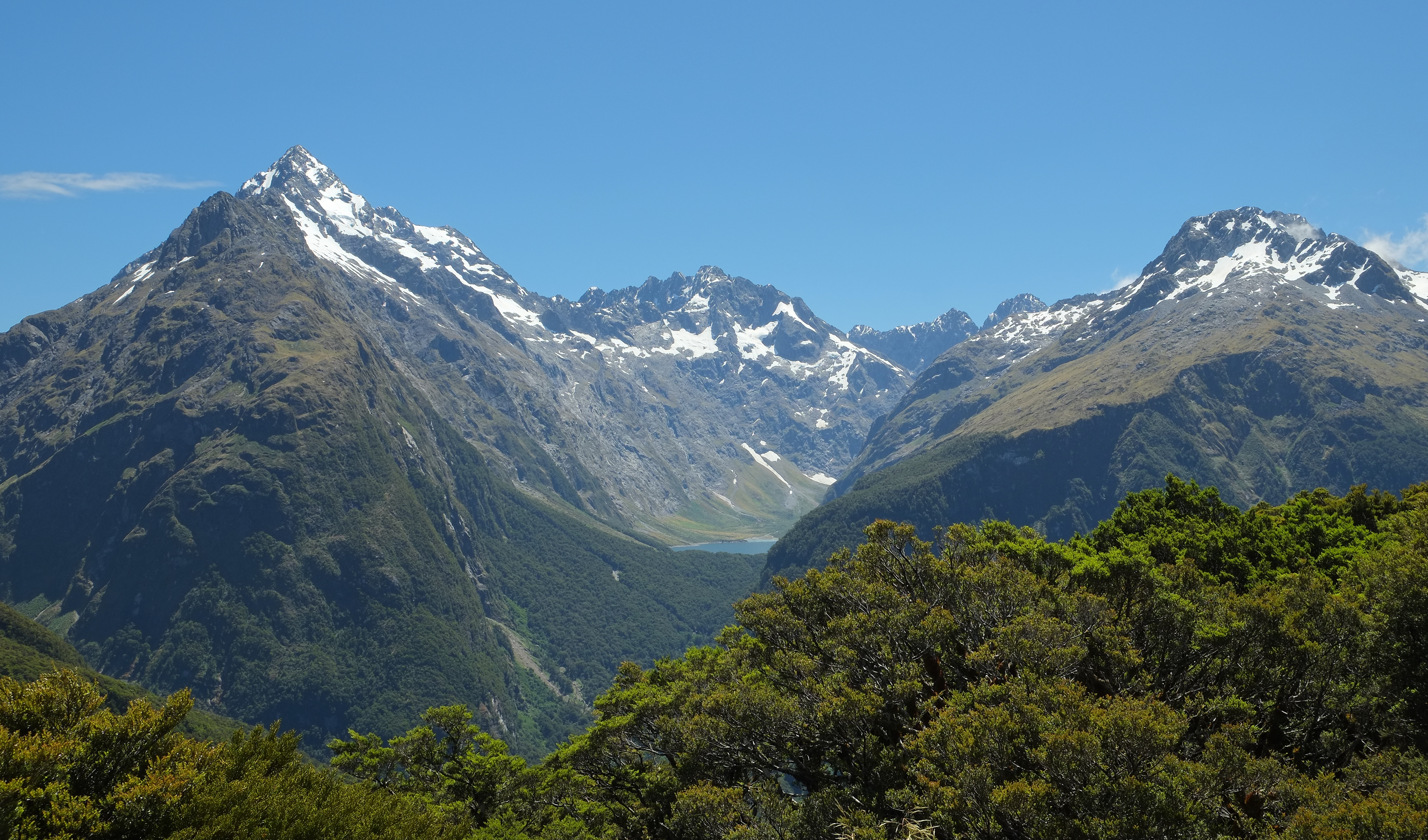
Mount Christina, Mount Crosscut, and Mount Lyttle from Key Summit

== See also ==
- List of mountains of New Zealand by height
