= Lake Marian =

Lake in New Zealand

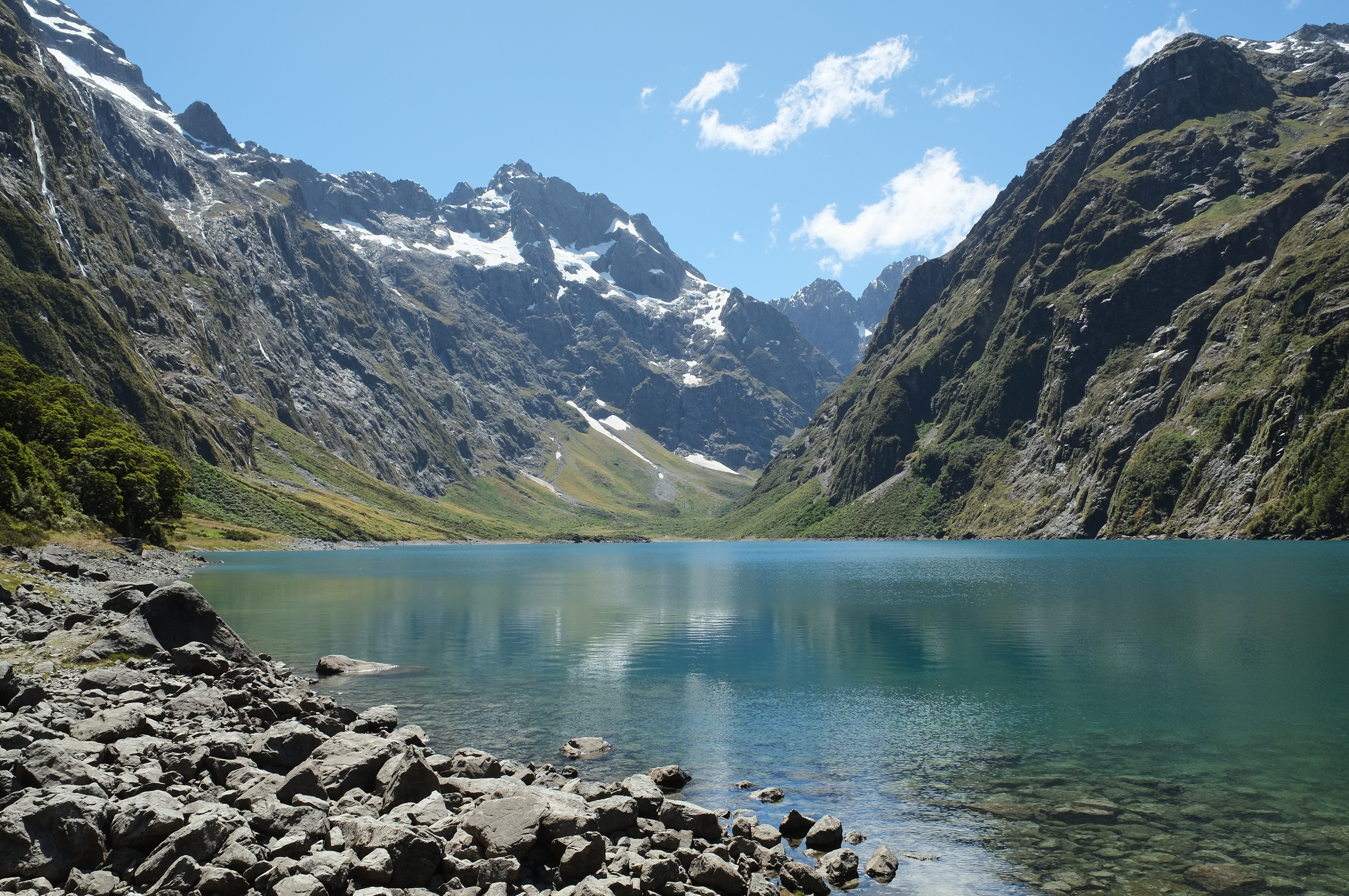
- Lake Marian from the end of the walking track, with Mount Crosscut behind

- Location within South Island
- Interactive map of Lake Marian
- Location: Fiordland, South Island
- Coordinates: 44.785°S 168.075°E
- Primary inflows: Marian Creek
- Primary outflows: Marian Creek
- Basin countries: New Zealand
- Max. length: 2 kilometres (1.2 mi)
- Max. width: 0.5 kilometres (0.3 mi)
- Surface elevation: 695 metres (2,280 ft)

Lake Marian is an alpine lake at the southern end of the Darran Mountains in the Fiordland National Park in the South Island of New Zealand. The lake is located just above the treeline in a hanging valley leading northwest from the Hollyford Valley near The Divide pass. The valley is sheltered by steep snow-covered peaks of over 2,000 metres (6,600 ft) on all sides apart from the entrance.

The lake is fed and drained by Marian Creek which in turn feeds into the Hollyford River / Whakatipu Kā Tuka. Marian Creek's catchment upstream of Lake Marian includes several permanent snowfields in a cirque at the head of the valley northeast of the peak of Mount Crosscut. There the creek drains two smaller alpine lakes, Lake Mariana and Lake Marianette, followed by the 122 metres (400 ft) tall Lyttle Falls, before it reaches Lake Marian.

A 3-hour return tramping track leads to the lake from a car park along the Hollyford Road, only 1 kilometre in from the Milford Road (SH94). The track starts by crossing the Hollyford River on a swing bridge before leading upstream alongside Marian Creek as it cascades over a series of small waterfalls. After this, the track becomes rougher and can be muddy in places, with the climb up to Lake Marian strenuous as it ascends almost 400 metres (1,300 ft) in height.

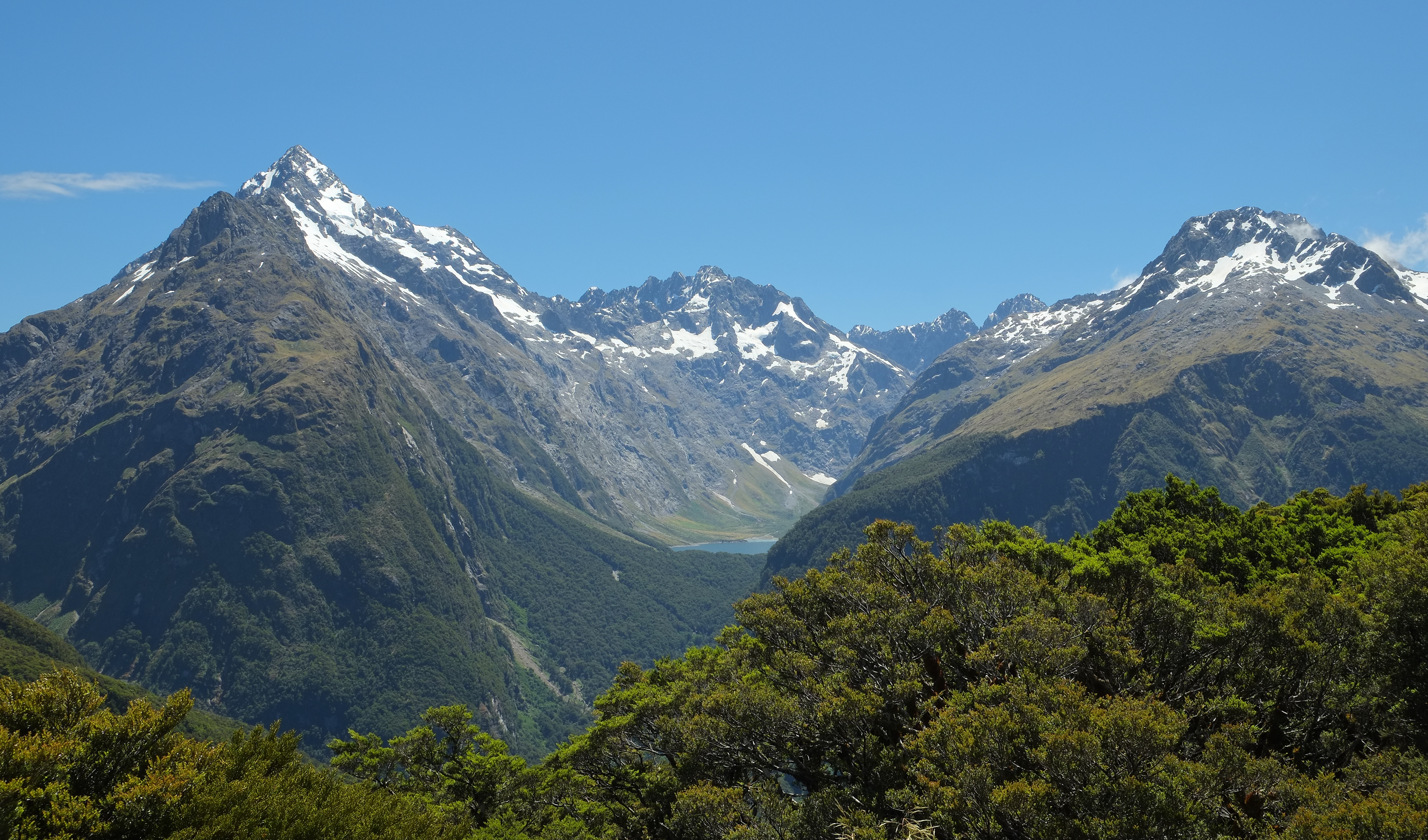
Lake Marian valley viewed from Key Summit – Mt Christina on the left, Mount Crosscut behind Lake Marian in the centre of the image, and Mount Lyttle on the right

A good view of Lake Marian as it sits in the hanging valley between the peaks of Mt Christina, Mount Crosscut, and Mt Gunn can also be glimpsed from Key Summit on the opposite side of the Hollyford Valley on a short side track from the Routeburn Track.
