= Ngatimamoe Peak =

Mountain in New Zealand

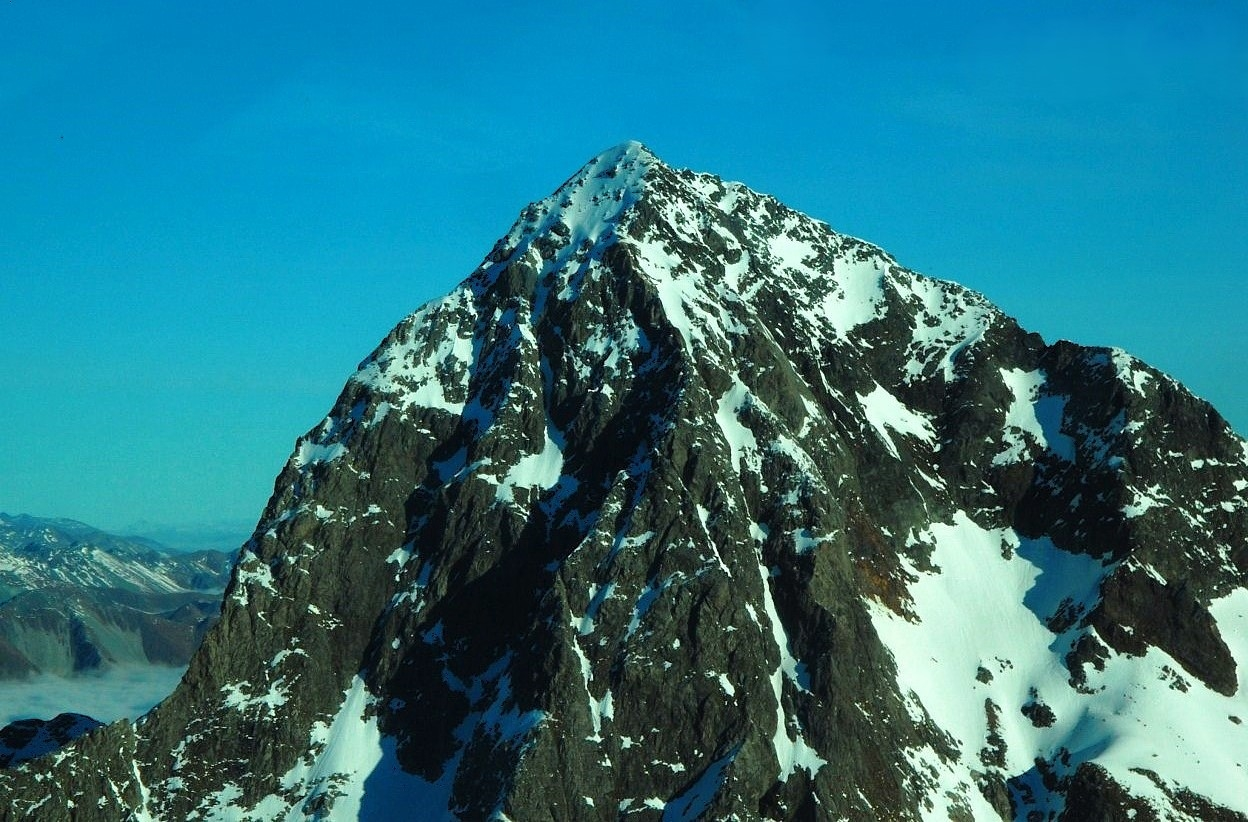
- Aerial view of the north face

Highest point
- Elevation: 2,164 m (7,100 ft)
- Prominence: 325 m (1,066 ft)
- Parent peak: Pyramid Peak
- Isolation: 1.69 km (1.05 mi)
- Coordinates: 44°50′37″S 168°01′59″E

Naming
- Etymology: Ngāti Māmoe

Geography
- Location within New Zealand
- Interactive map of Ngatimamoe Peak
- Location: South Island
- Country: New Zealand
- Region: Southland
- Protected area: Fiordland National Park
- Parent range: Earl Mountains
- Topo map: NZTopo50 CB09

Geology
- Rock type: Igneous rock (Diorite)

Climbing
- First ascent: 1934

Ngatimamoe Peak is a 2,164-metre-elevation (7,100-foot) mountain summit in Fiordland, New Zealand.

== Description ==
Ngatimamoe Peak is the third-highest peak of the Earl Mountains and is situated in the Southland Region of the South Island. It is set within Fiordland National Park which is part of the Te Wahipounamu UNESCO World Heritage Site. Precipitation runoff from the mountain's north slope drains to the Hollyford River via Falls Creek, whereas the south slope drains into the headwaters of Mistake Creek → West Branch Eglinton River → Eglinton River → Lake Te Anau. Topographic relief is significant as the summit rises 1,160 metres (3,806 feet) above the Mistake Creek Valley in one kilometre, and 1,260 metres (4,134 feet) above Falls Creek Valley in 1.5 kilometre. The nearest higher neighbour is Pyramid Peak, 1.7 kilometre to the west. This mountain's toponym has been officially approved by the New Zealand Geographic Board. The peak was named by Dick Ferris in 1934 to honour the Ngāti Māmoe, a Māori iwi.

== Climbing ==
The first ascent of the summit was made in April 1934 by Dick Ferris, Arthur Hynd, Gordon Lindsay, and Arch Smiley.

Climbing routes with the first ascents:

- North East Ridge – Dick Ferris, Arthur Hynd, Gordon Lindsay, Arch Smiley – (1934)
- West Ridge – Bill Gordon, David Henderson, Ralph Miller – (1960)
- South East Ridge – Harold Jacobs, Sandy Macpherson – (1964)
- South Ridge – Austin Brookes, Paul Frude – (1971)

== Climate ==
Based on the Köppen climate classification, Ngatimamoe Peak is located in a marine west coast climate zone. Prevailing westerly winds blow moist air from the Tasman Sea onto the mountains, where the air is forced upward by the mountains (orographic lift), causing moisture to drop in the form of rain or snow. This climate supports a small glacial remnant on the lower south slope. The months of December through February offer the most favourable weather for viewing or climbing this peak.

== Gallery ==
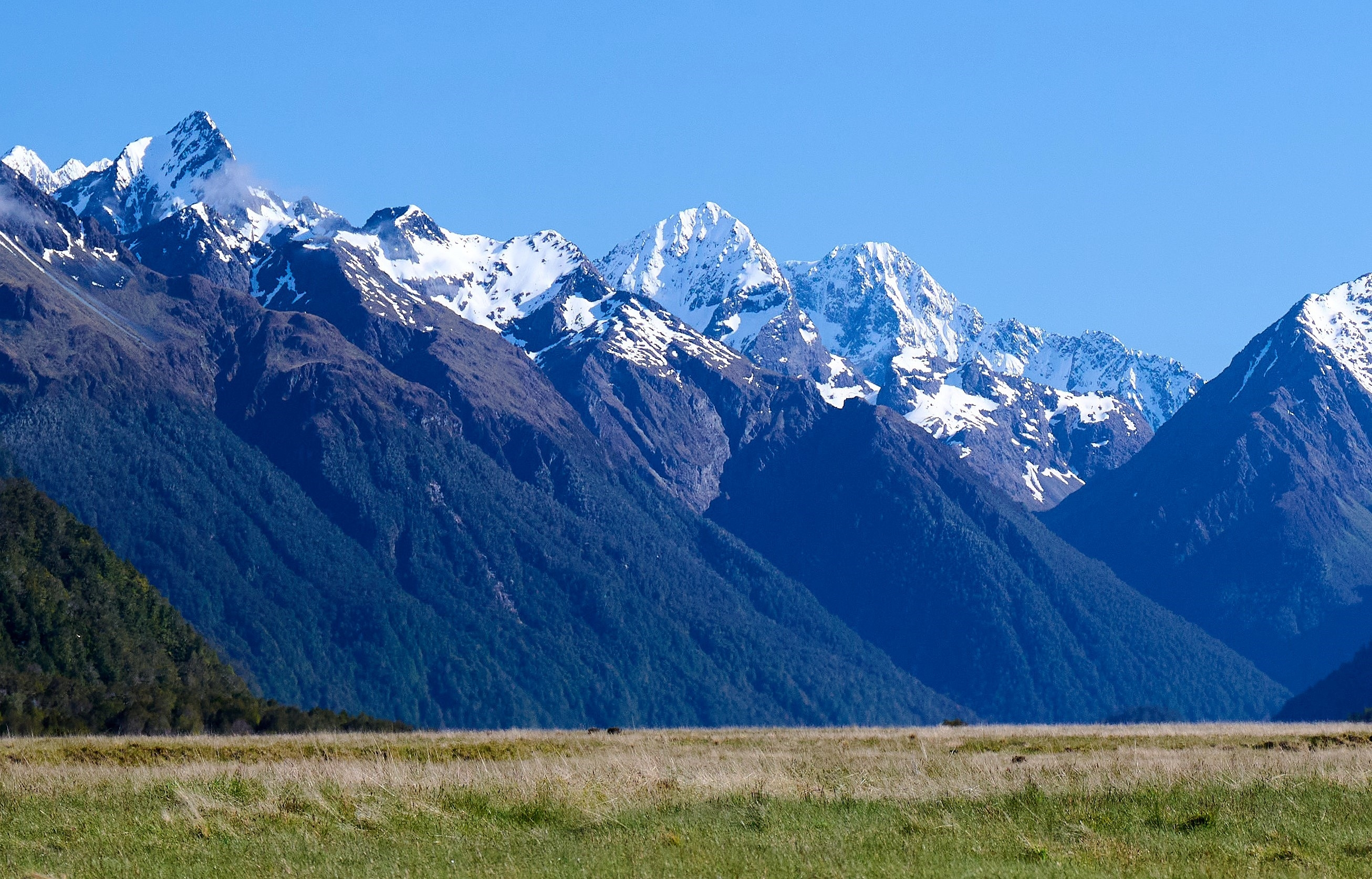
Eglinton Valley, Ngatimamoe Peak centred, Triangle Peak in upper left, Mount Christina to immediate right of Ngatimamoe Peak

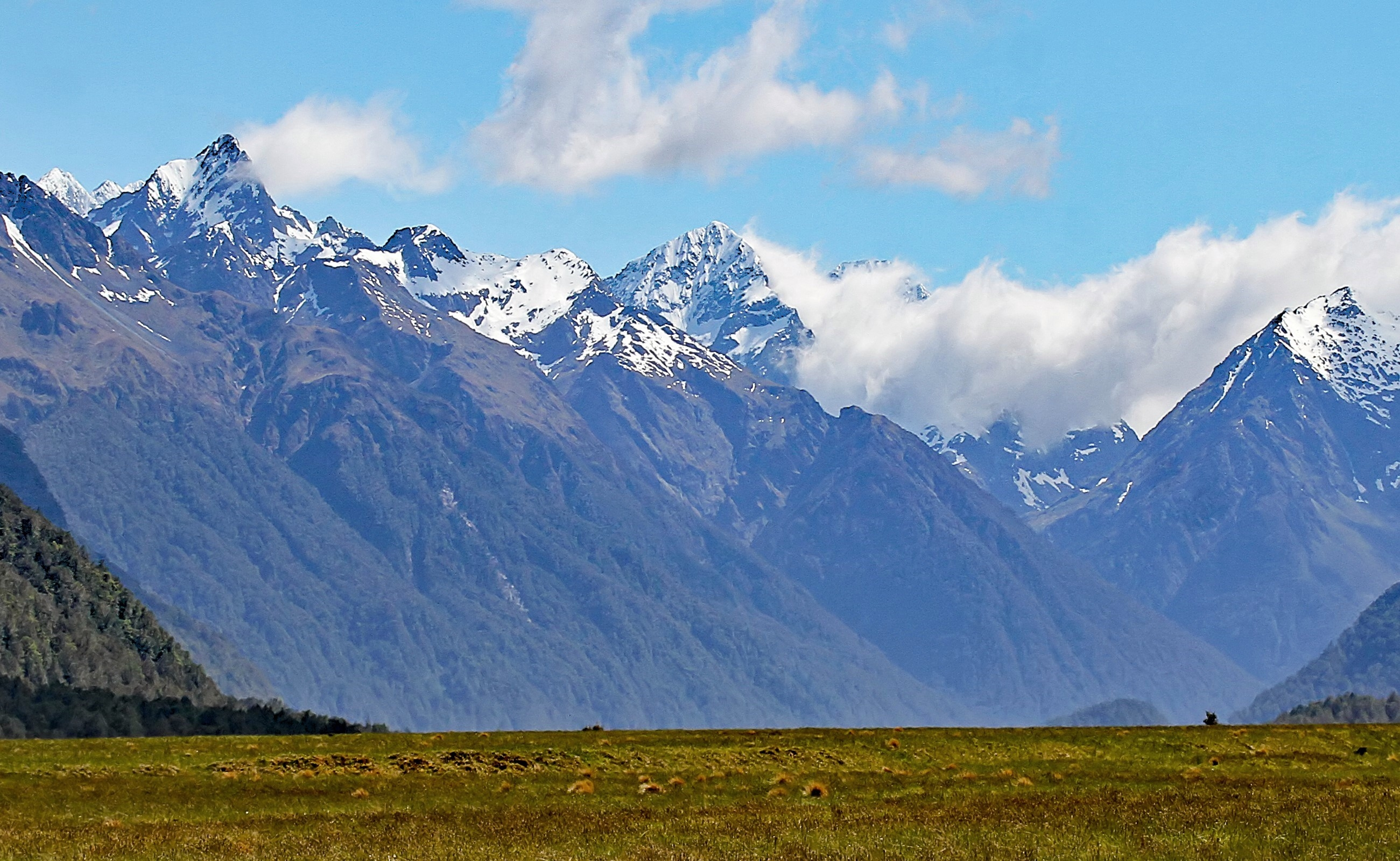
Eglinton Valley, Ngatimamoe Peak centred, Triangle Peak in upper left

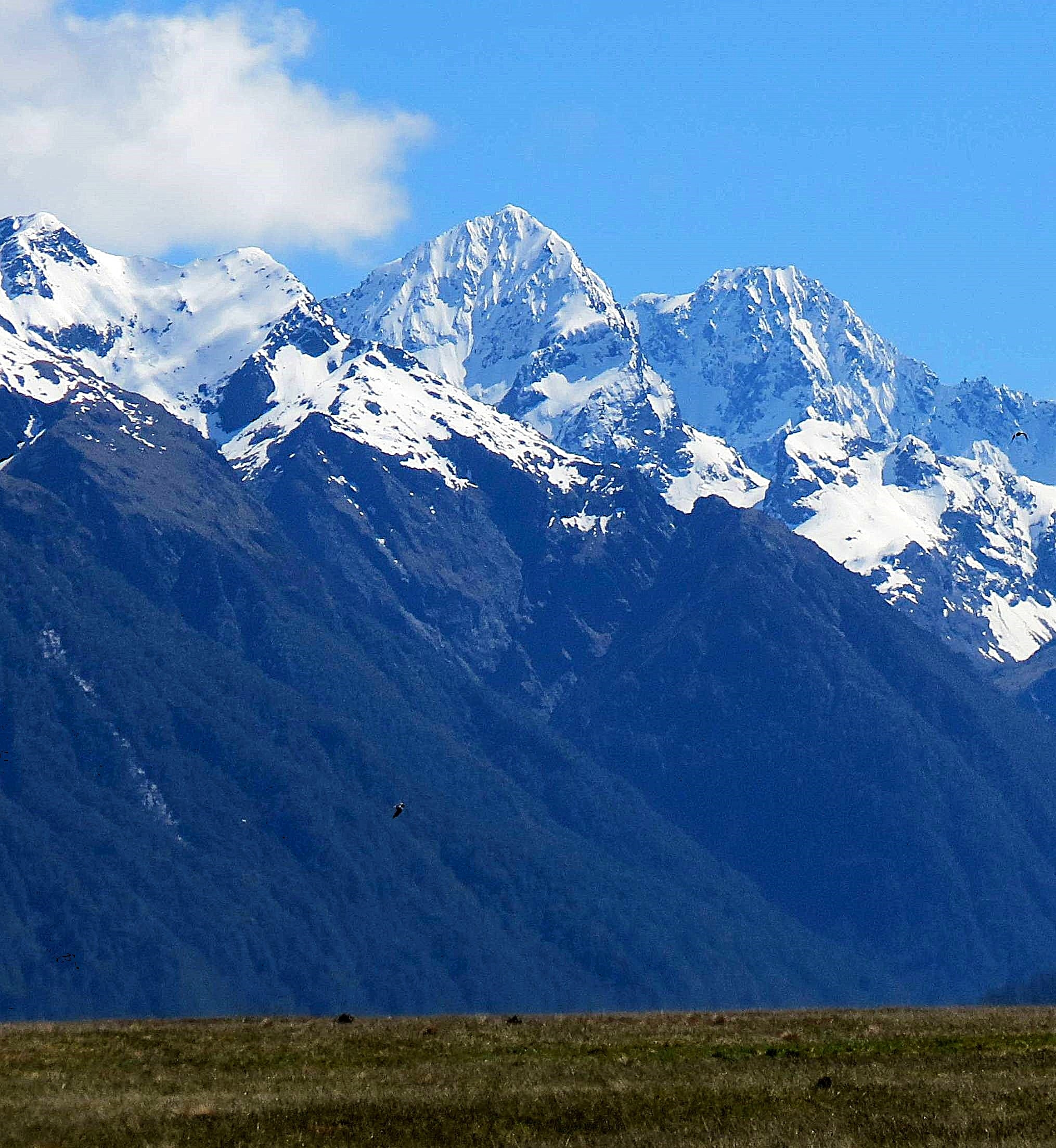
Eglinton Valley, Ngatimamoe Peak centred, Mount Christina to right

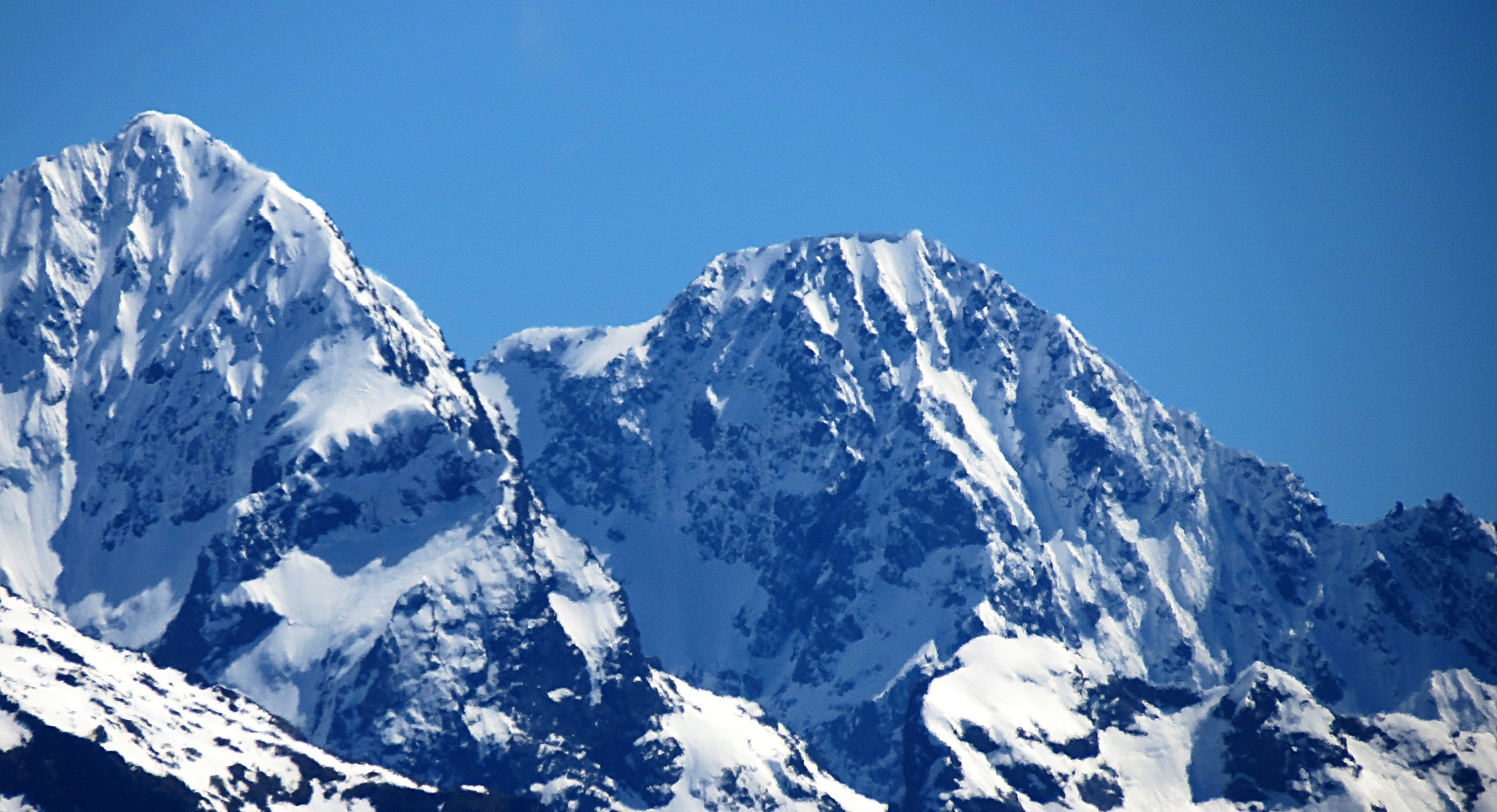
South face of Ngatimamoe Peak left, Mount Christina centred

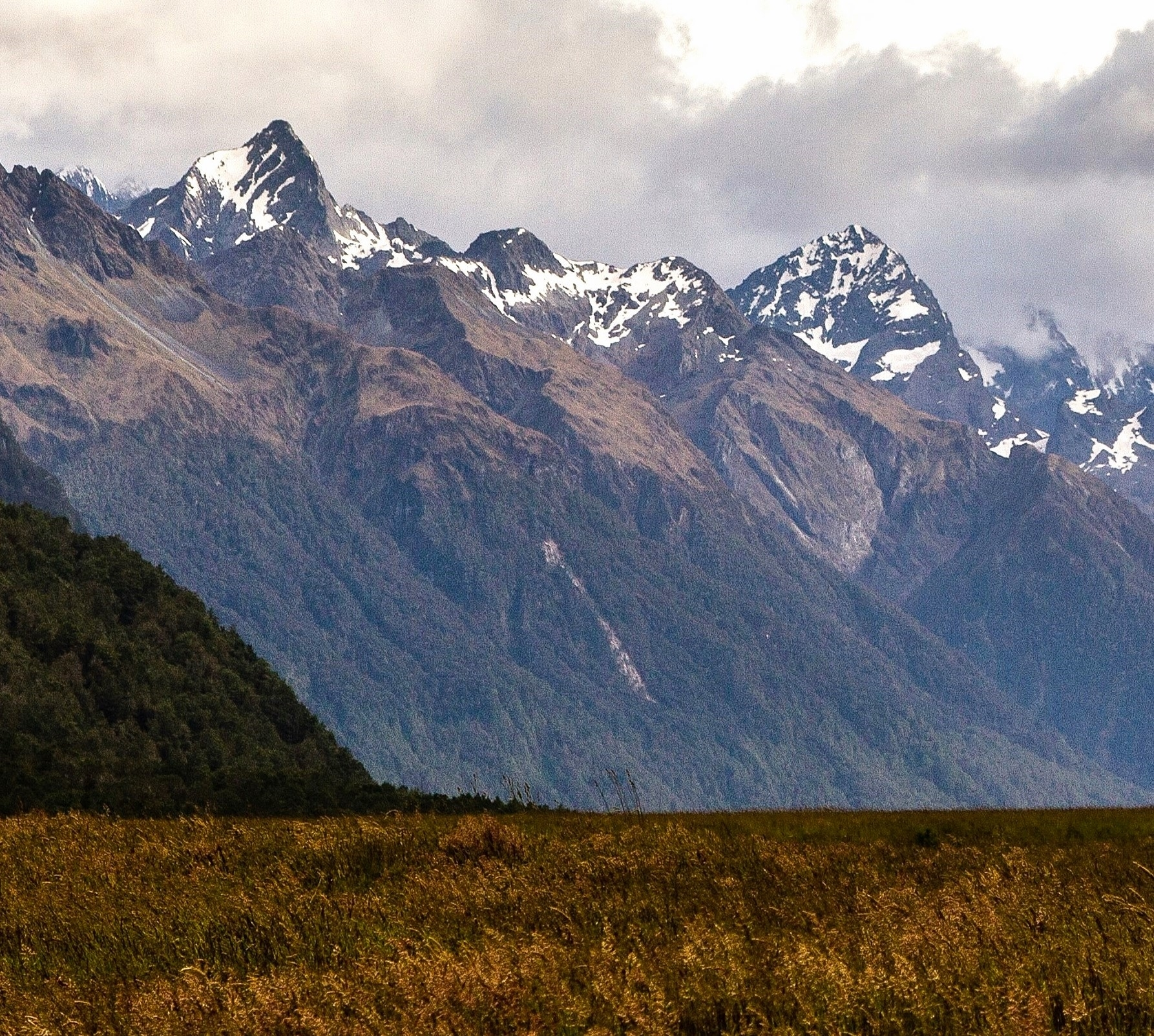
Triangle Peak (left), Ngatimamoe Peak (right) from Eglinton Valley

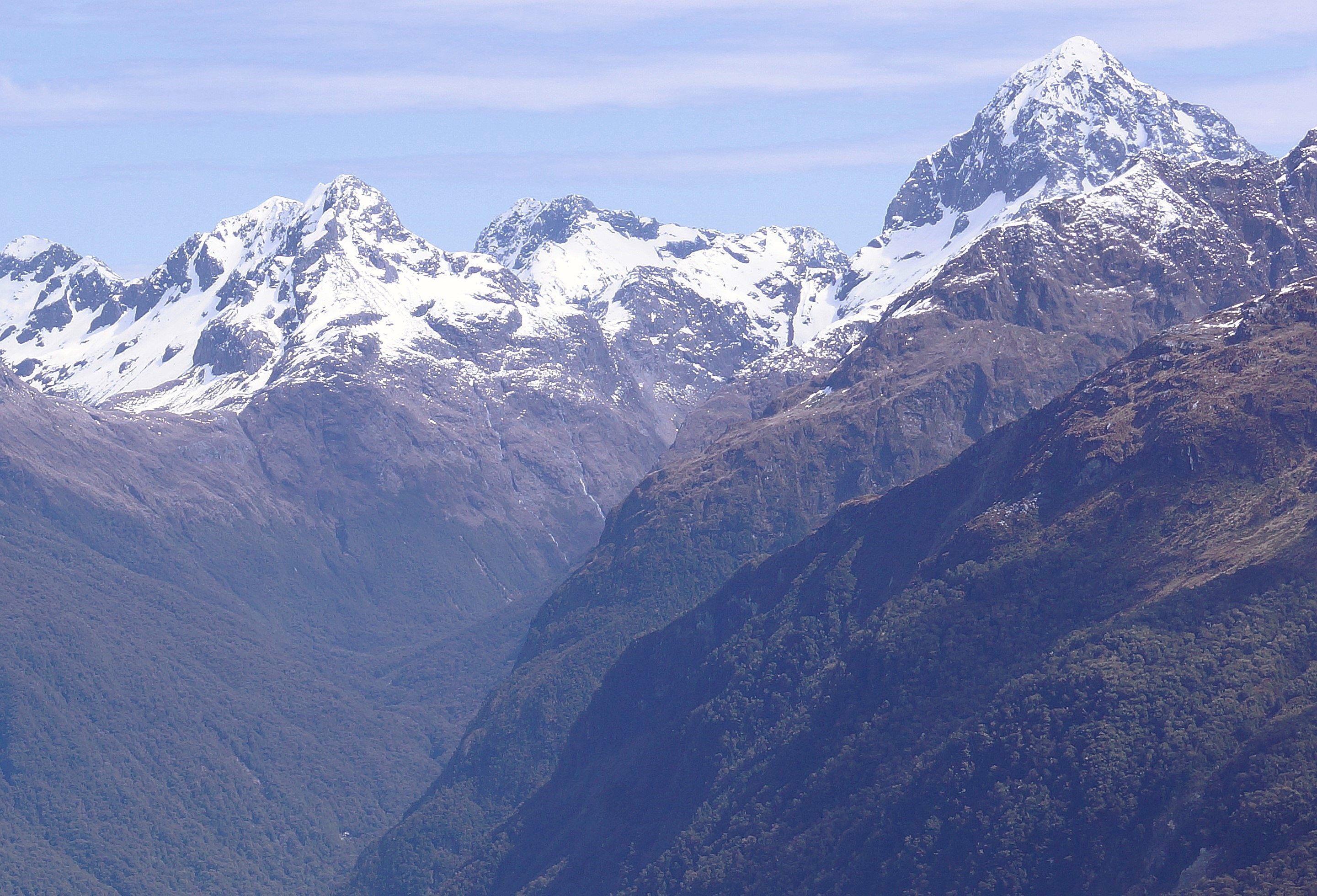
Northeast aspect of Ngatimamoe Peak (upper right) from Routeburn Track. Consolation Peak (1851 m) to left.

== See also ==
- List of mountains of New Zealand by height
- Fiordland
