= Pyramid Peak (Southland) =

Mountain in New Zealand

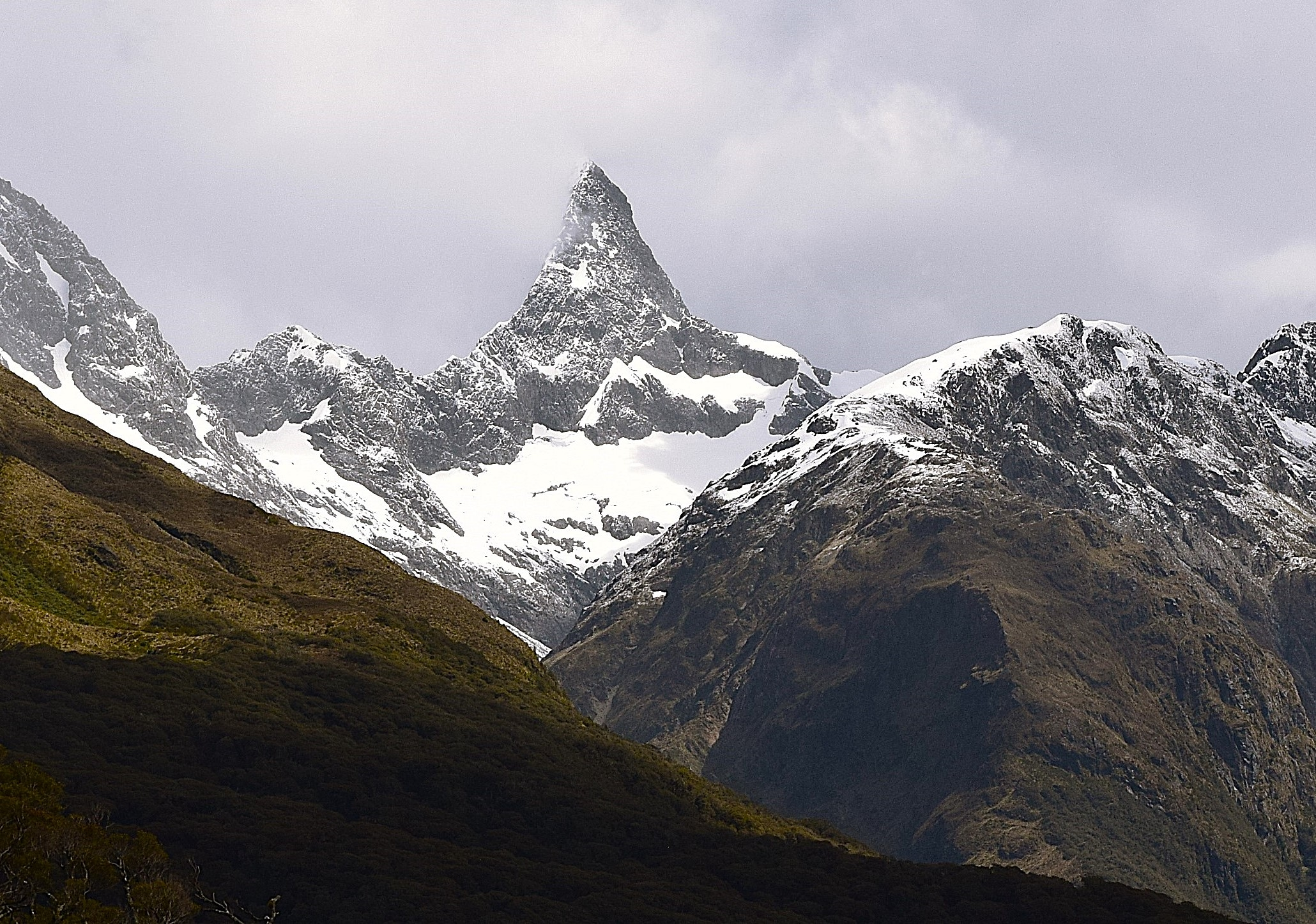
- East aspect

Highest point
- Elevation: 2,295 m (7,530 ft)
- Prominence: 920 m (3,018 ft)
- Isolation: 5.7 km (3.5 mi)
- Coordinates: 44°50′21″S 168°00′45″E

Naming
- Etymology: Pyramidal peak

Geography
- Location within New Zealand
- Interactive map of Pyramid Peak
- Location: South Island
- Country: New Zealand
- Region: Southland
- Protected area: Fiordland National Park
- Parent range: Earl Mountains
- Topo map: NZTopo50 CB09

Geology
- Mountain type: Glacial horn
- Rock type: Igneous rock (Diorite)

Climbing
- First ascent: 1951

Pyramid Peak is a 2,295-metre-elevation (7,530-foot) mountain summit in Fiordland, New Zealand.

== Description ==
Pyramid Peak is the highest point of the Earl Mountains and is situated in the Southland Region of the South Island. It is set within Fiordland National Park which is part of the Te Wahipounamu UNESCO World Heritage Site. Precipitation runoff from the mountain's northeast slope drains to the Hollyford River via Falls Creek, whereas the southeast slope drains into the headwaters of Mistake Creek → West Branch Eglinton River → Eglinton River → Lake Te Anau, and the west slope drains into Lake Erskine → Neale Burn → Clinton River → Lake Te Anau. Topographic relief is significant as the summit rises 1,800 metres (5,906 feet) above the Neale Burn Valley in three kilometres, and 1,100 metres (3,609 feet) above Falls Creek Valley in one kilometre. The nearest higher neighbour is Mount Christina, six kilometres to the north-northeast in the Darran Mountains. This mountain's descriptive toponym has been officially approved by the New Zealand Geographic Board. One account claims the peak was named by S.C. Bowmar and his brother while exploring the area in 1933, whereas another report has this peak being named by Dal and Rod Ryan, probably on the first ascent in 1951.

== Climate ==
Based on the Köppen climate classification, Pyramid Peak is located in a marine west coast climate zone. Prevailing westerly winds blow moist air from the Tasman Sea onto the mountains, where the air is forced upward by the mountains (orographic lift), causing moisture to drop in the form of rain or snow. This climate supports a small unnamed glacier on the lower southeast slope. The months of December through February offer the most favourable weather for viewing or climbing this peak.

== Climbing ==
The first ascent of the summit was made in January 1951 by Rod Ryan and Dal Ryan via a route up the north ridge and across the northeast face to the top of the east ridge.

Climbing routes:

- Original Route – Rod Ryan, Dal Ryan – (1951)
- East Ridge – Dal Ryan, R.H. Shelton, S.G. Hunter – (1958)
- West Ridge – Austin Brookes, Dal Ryan – (1965)
- North Face – James Jenkins, Tim Lindley – (1973)
- Stormfront (North Face) – Ian Brown, Peter Blunt – (2001)
- North East Face – Ian Brown, Tom Williams – (2002)
- South Face – Ben Dare – (2020)

== See also ==
- List of mountains of New Zealand by height
- Fiordland
