= Mount Christina =

Mountain in Fiordland, New Zealand

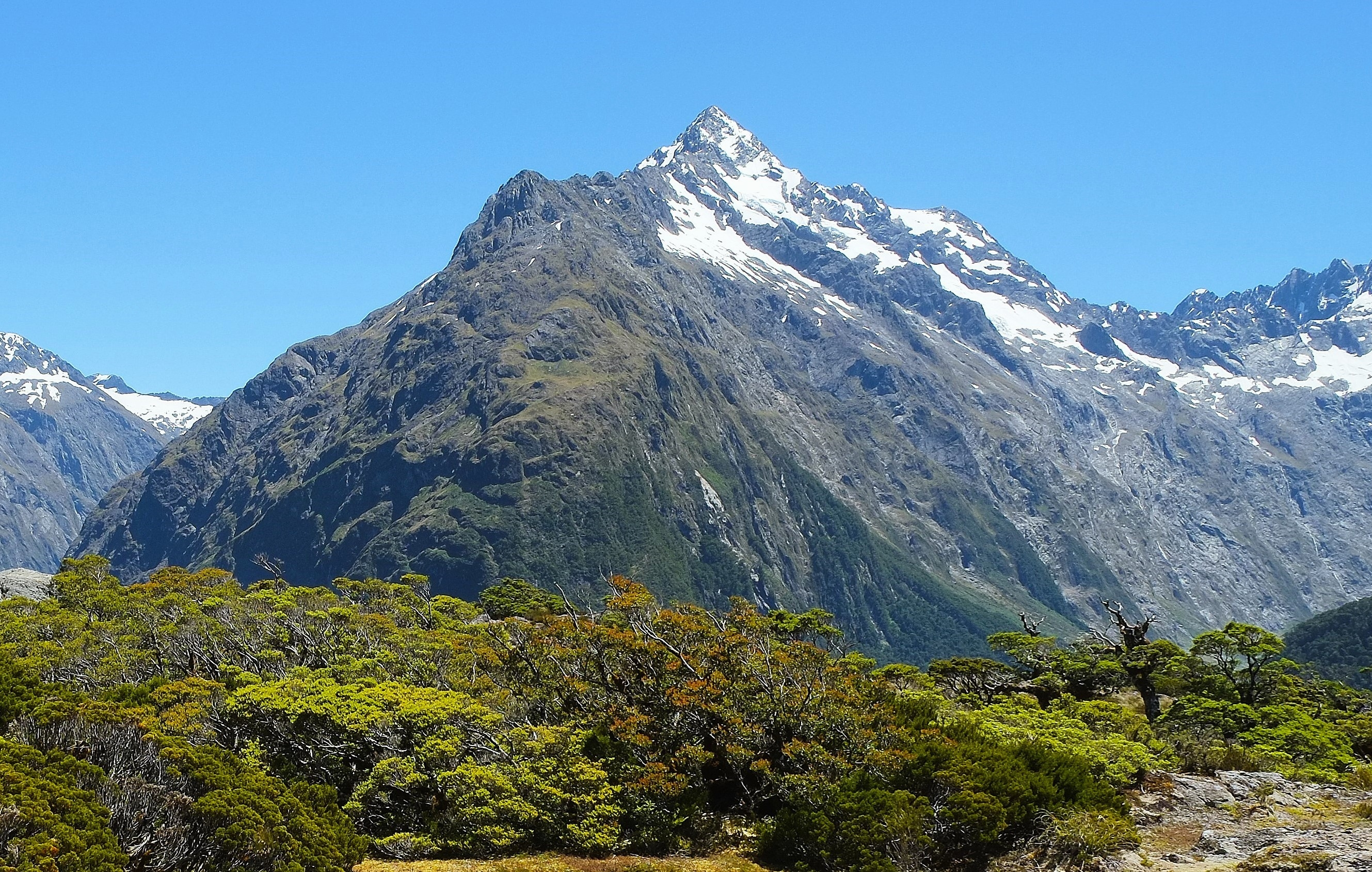
- East-southeast aspect

Highest point
- Elevation: 2,474 m (8,117 ft)
- Prominence: 1,076 m (3,530 ft)
- Isolation: 19.89 km (12.36 mi)
- Listing: Highest mountains of New Zealand
- Coordinates: 44°47′35″S 168°02′54″E

Naming
- Etymology: Christina McKerchar Gillow

Geography
- Location within New Zealand
- Interactive map of Mount Christina
- Location: South Island
- Country: New Zealand
- Region: Southland
- Protected area: Fiordland National Park
- Parent range: Darran Mountains
- Topo map(s): NZMS260 D41; Topo50 CB09

Geology
- Rock age: 136 ± 1.9 Ma
- Rock type(s): Gabbronorite, dioritic orthogneiss

Climbing
- First ascent: 1926

Mount Christina is a 2,474-metre-elevation (8,117-foot) mountain in Fiordland, New Zealand.

== Description ==
Mount Christina is the southernmost peak of the Darran Mountains and is situated in the Southland Region of South Island. It is set within Fiordland National Park which is part of the Te Wahipounamu UNESCO World Heritage Site. Precipitation runoff from the mountain drains into tributaries of the Hollyford River. Topographic relief is significant as the summit rises nearly 2,000 metres (6,562 feet) above the Hollyford Valley in two kilometres. The mountain was named in 1870 by James McKerrow for Christina McKerchar (1838–1928), who later became the wife of George Gillow. Christina was believed to be a friend of McKerrow's wife, Martha. McKerrow had first seen the mountain from Mount Eglinton in 1863. The first ascent of the summit was made in 1926 by Bob Sinclair, Ken Roberts, Harry Slater, George Moir, and Bill Grave.

== Climbing ==
Climbing routes on Mount Christina:

- Original Route – Bob Sinclair, Ken Roberts, Harry Slater, George Moir, Bill Grave – (1926)
- Gordon Hall-Jones Miller – Bill Gordon, Gerry Hall-Jones, Ralph Miller – (1955)
- South West Face – Bill Gordon, Ralph Miller, Dal Ryan – (1957)
- East Ridge – Ron Dickie, Harold Jacobs – (1964)
- Brookes Simpson – Austin Brookes, Archie Simpson – (1965)
- South Ridge – Murray Jones, Harold Jacobs – (1966)
- Skyline Buttress – Austin Brookes, Roger McCurdy, Bev Noble, Rod McLeod – (1974)
- McLeod Route – Bill McLeod – (1980)
- South West Ridge – Dave Vass – (1989)
- The European Connection – Greg Aimer, Dave Brash, Jurgren Besswenger – (1990)
- Complete East Ridge – Craig Jefferies, Steve Skelton, Kyle Walter – (2021)

== Climate ==
Based on the Köppen climate classification, Mount Christina is located in a marine west coast climate zone. Prevailing westerly winds blow moist air from the Tasman Sea onto the mountain, where the air is forced upward by the mountains (orographic lift), causing moisture to drop in the form of rain and snow. This climate supports small unnamed glaciers on the north slope. The months of December through February offer the most favourable weather for viewing or climbing this peak.

== Gallery ==
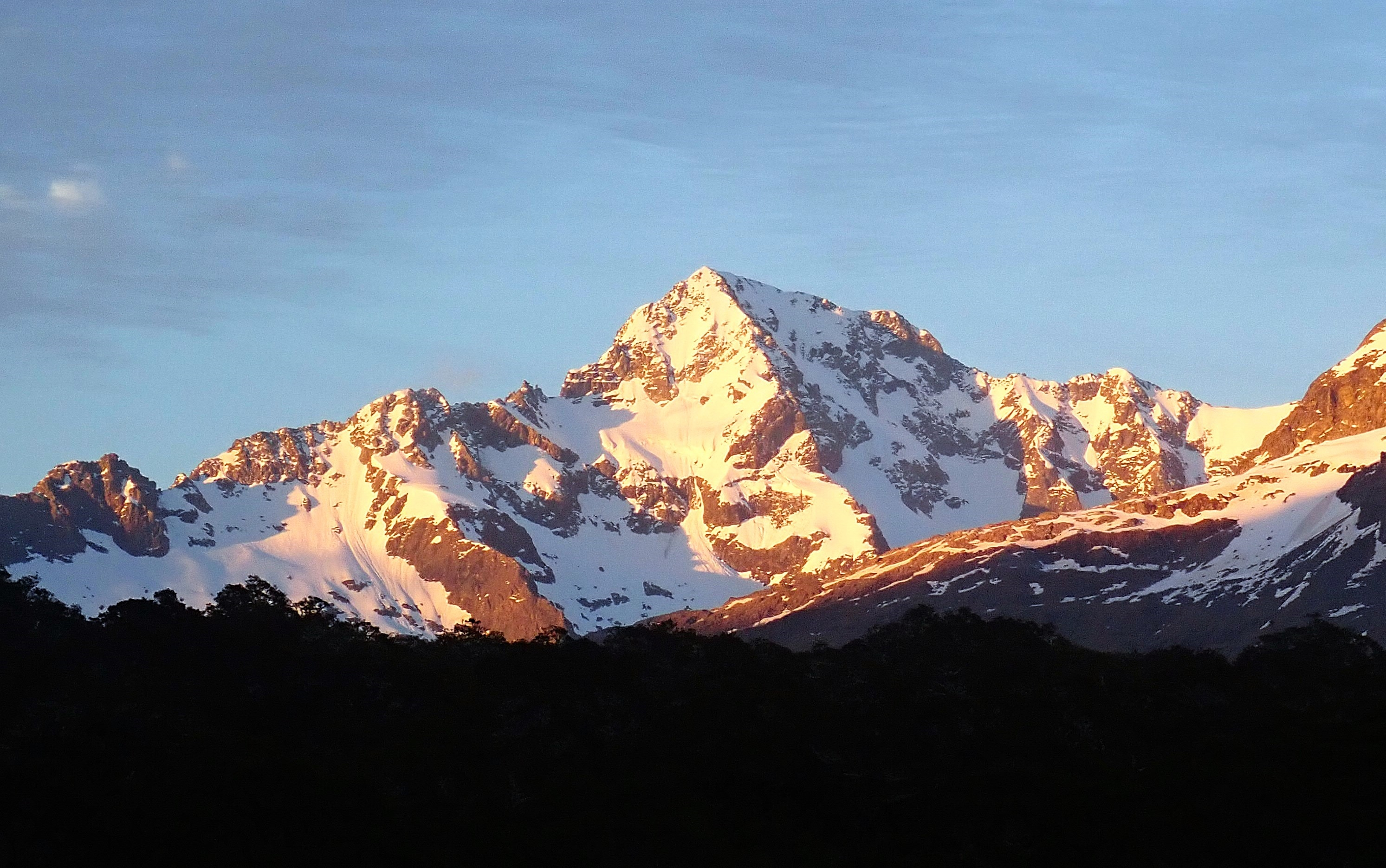
Northeast aspect, from Lake MacKenzie Lodge

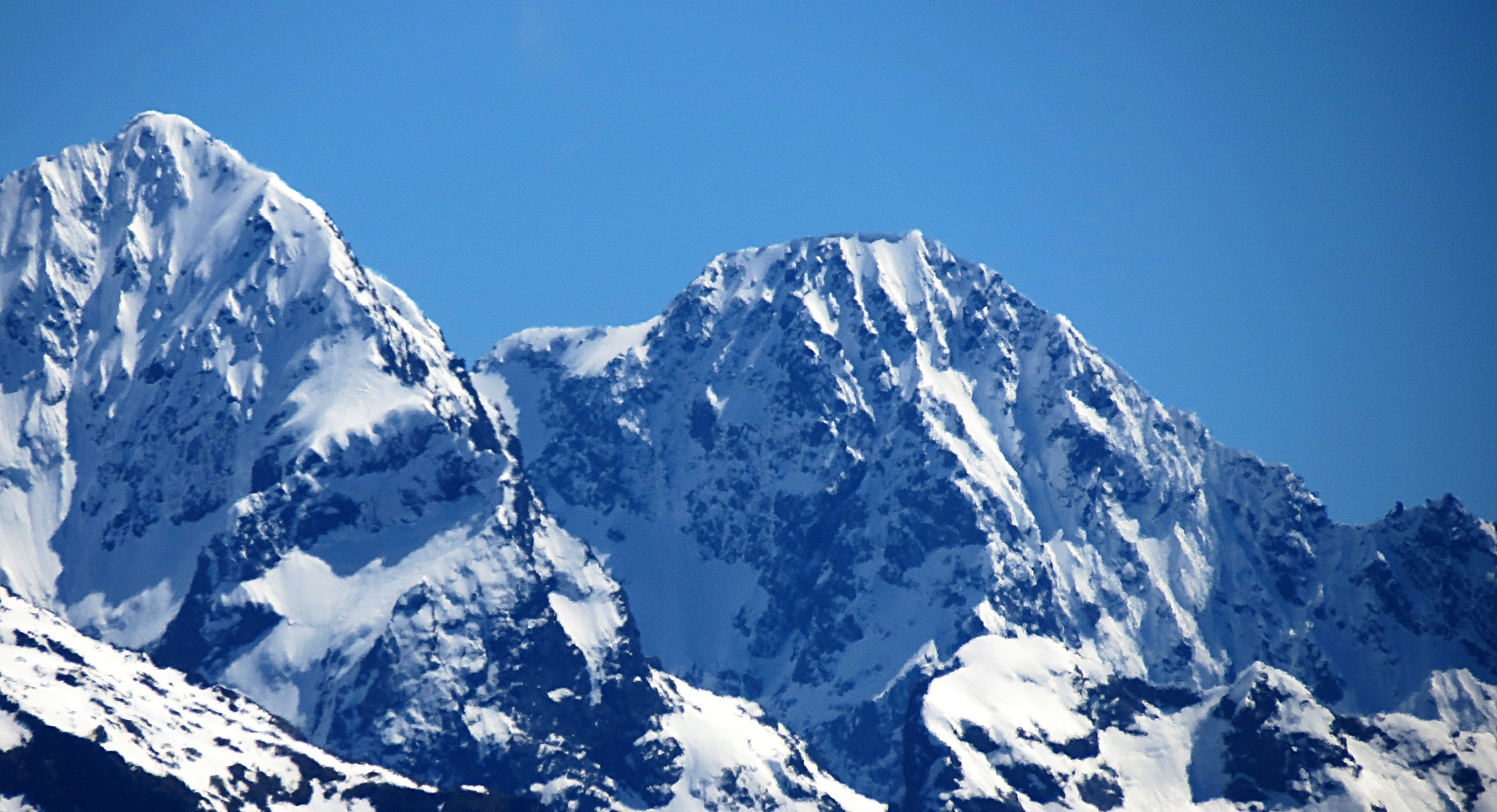
South aspect of Mount Christina centred, Ngatimamoe Peak left

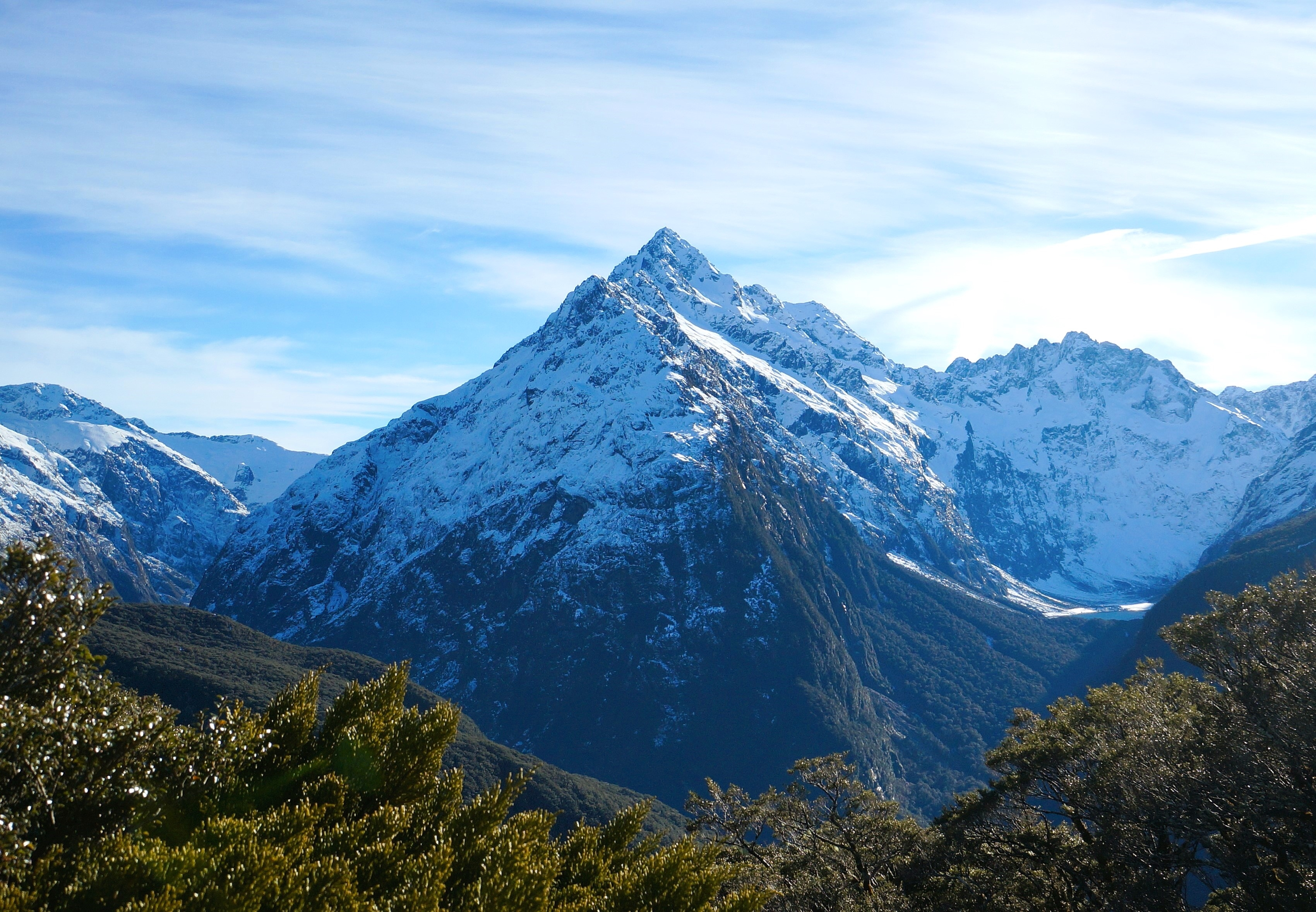
Mount Christina seen from Key Summit, with Mount Crosscut to right

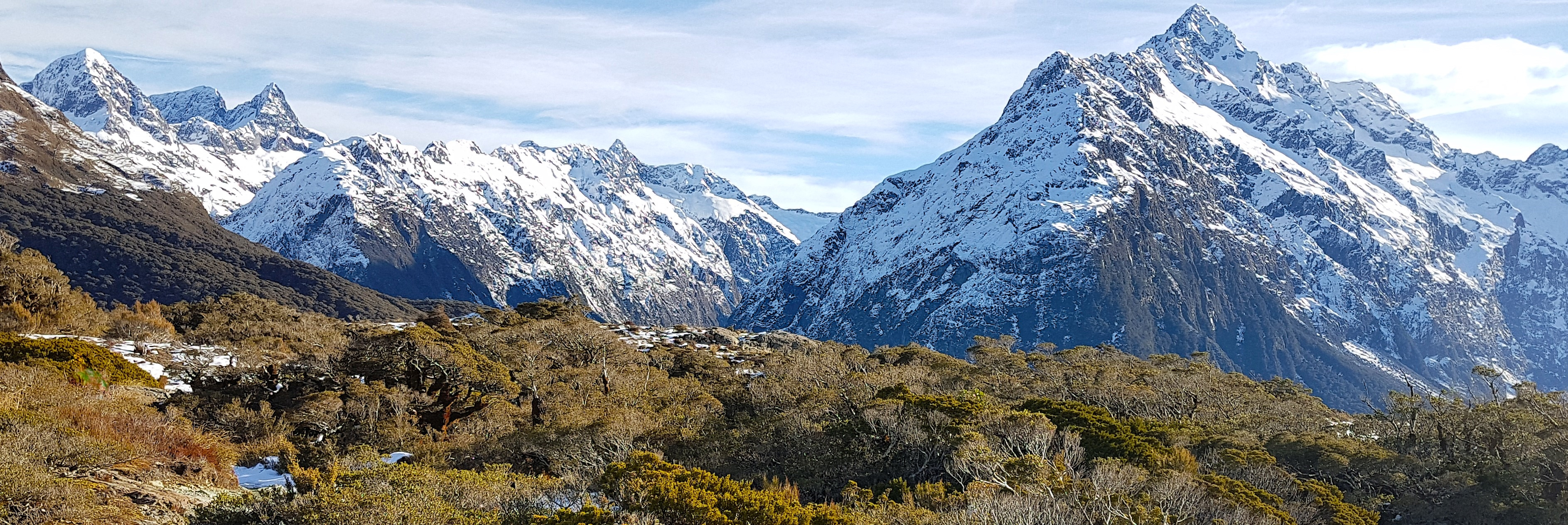
Mount Christina (right) viewed from Key Summit

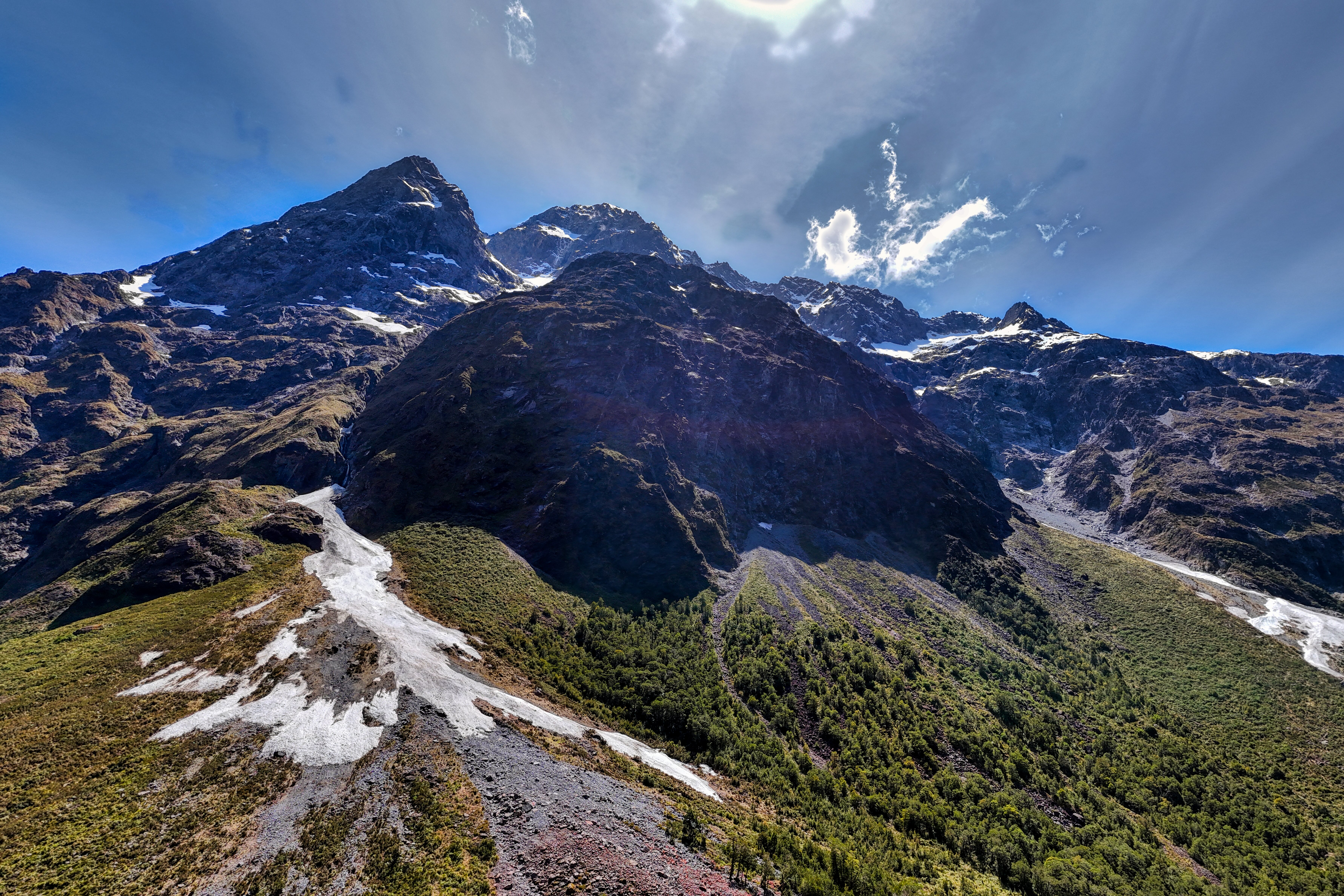
Mount Christina viewed from Hollyford Valley

== See also ==
- List of mountains of New Zealand by height
- Fiordland
