= Gunn (surname) =

Gunn is a surname. In some cases, the surname is derived from the Old Norse masculine personal name Gunnr. In other cases it may be derived from the Old Norse feminine personal name Gunnhildr. It is also a diminutive of the Irish surname MacElgunn, deriving from Mac Gioll Dhuinn.

== People ==
- Aaron Gunn (born 1989/90), Canadian politician
- Adam Gunn (1872–1935), American decathlete
- Alex Gunn, New Zealand professor of education
- Alexander Gunn (politician) (1828–1907), Canadian politician
- Alexander Gunn (doctor) (1845–1914), Scottish physician
- Alistair Gunn (1924–2010), Scottish footballer
- Allan Gunn (1943–2004), English football referee
- Andrew Gunn (film producer) (1967–2026), Canadian film producer
- Andrew Gunn (director), British television director
- Angus Gunn (born 1996), English-Scottish footballer
- Anna Gunn (born 1968), American actress
- Anne Gunn (1756 – c. 1813), Scottish musician and inventor
- Anton Gunn (born 1973), American politician
- Arthur Gunn (born 1997), American singer
- Austin Gunn (born 1994), American professional wrestler
- B. T. Gunn (born 1986), Scottish professional wrestler
- Barnabas Gunn (1680–1753), English organist and composer
- Bart Gunn (born 1965), American professional wrestler and mixed martial artist
- Battiscombe Gunn (1883–1950), English Egyptologist and philologist
- Ben Gunn (campaigner) (born 1965), British consultant, writer, and convicted murderer
- Benjamin B. Gunn (1860–1907), Canadian politician
- Benn Gunn, Australian country performer
- Bert Gunn (1903–1962), British newspaper editor
- Betty Gunn (born 1937), Scottish swimmer
- Bill Gunn (writer) (1934–1989), American dramatist
- Bill Gunn (footballer, born 1899), Australian rules footballer
- Bill Gunn (footballer, born 1932), Australian rules footballer
- Bill Gunn (Queensland politician, born 1920) (1920–2001), Australian politician
- Bill Gunn (Queensland politician, born 1895) (1895–1970), Australian politician
- Billy Gunn (born 1963), American professional wrestler
- Bobby Gunn (born 1973), Canadian boxer
- Brian Gunn (born 1970), American actor
- Brian Gunn (cricketer) (1921–2001), English cricketer
- Bruno Gunn (born 1968), American actor
- Bryan Gunn (born 1963), Scottish association football player and manager
- Bryn Gunn (born 1958), English footballer
- Bunty Gunn (born 1933), British television presenter
- Chan Gunn (born 1931), Canadian academic
- Chanda Gunn (born 1980), American ice hockey player
- Charles A. Gunn (1870–1945), American architect
- Charles Gunn (athlete) (1885–1983), British racewalker
- Charles Gunn (actor) (1883–1918), American actor
- Christy Gunn (born 1985), HK international rugby union player
- Colten Gunn (born 1991), American wrestler
- Craig Gunn (born 1987), Scottish footballer
- Daniel Gunn (minister) (1774–1848), British minister
- Davey Gunn (1887–1955), New Zealand businessman
- David Gunn (composer) (born 2000), American composer
- David Gunn (author), British writer
- David Gunn (American football), American athletic administrator, football coach, and player
- David L. Gunn (born 1937), American transit planner and executive
- David M. Gunn, Australian religious scholar
- Donald Gunn (1797–1878), Canadian politician
- Donald Gunn (Australian politician) (1856–1943), Australian politician
- Douglas Gunn (1841–1891), American journalist and 5th Mayor of San Diego
- Eileen Gunn (born 1945), American writer
- Elizabeth Gunn (paediatrician) (1879–1963), New Zealand physician and child health administrator
- Elizabeth Gunn (author) (1927–2022), American mystery writer
- Frederick C. Gunn (1865–1959), American architect
- Frederick William Gunn (1816–1881), American educator
- Genni Gunn, Canadian novelist, poet, and translator
- George F. Gunn Jr. (1927–1998), American judge
- George Gunn (cricketer) (1879–1958), English cricketer
- George Gunn (Canadian politician) (1833–1901), Canadian politician
- George P. Gunn (1903–1973), American prelate
- George Ward Gunn (1912–1941), British recipient of the Victoria Cross
- Gia Gunn (born 1990), American drag performer
- Gilbert Gunn (1905–1967), British screenwriter and film director
- Gomer Gunn (1885–1935), Welsh rugby league footballer
- Graeme Gunn (born 1933), Australian architect
- Graham Gunn (born 1942), Australian politician
- Greg Gunn (died 2016), American fatally shot by police
- Harland Gunn (born 1989), American football player
- Harriet Gunn (1806–1869), English artist and lithographer
- Hartford N. Gunn Jr. (1927–1986), Founding President of PBS
- Herbert James Gunn (1893–1964), Scottish painter
- Isabel Gunn (1781–1861), Scottish woman who worked for Hudson's Bay Company
- J. A. W. Gunn (1937–2023), Canadian political philosopher
- J. B. Gunn (1928–2008), British physicist
- Jackie Gunn (born 1977), British bobsledder
- James Andrew Gunn (1882–1958), British pharmacologist
- James E. Gunn (1923–2020), American science fiction author
- James Gunn (Georgia politician) (1753–1801), American politician
- James Gunn (born 1966), American filmmaker
- James Gunn (astronomer) (born 1938), American astronomer
- James Gunn (Idaho politician) (1843–1911), Union United States Army officer
- James Gunn (screenwriter, born 1920) (1920–1966), American screenwriter
- Janet Gunn (born 1961), American actress
- Jason Gunn (born 1968), New Zealand television and radio personality
- JD Gunn (born 2000), Panamanian footballer
- Jeannie Gunn (1870–1961), Australian novelist
- Jenny Gunn (born 1986), English cricketer
- Jeremy Gunn, English footballer and manager
- Jimmy Gunn (1948–2015), American football player
- Jimmy Gunn (golfer) (born 1980), Scottish golfer
- John Alexander Gunn (1896–1975), 20th-century British philosophers
- John Currie Gunn (1916–2002), British physicist
- John Edward Gunn (1863–1924), Irish-born prelate
- John Gunn (Scottish writer) (c.1765–c.1824), Scottish cellist & writer
- John Gunn (cricketer) (1876–1963), English cricketer
- John Gunn (Australian politician) (1884–1959), Australian politician
- John Gunn (geologist) (1801–1890), British geologist
- John Gunn (Manitoba politician) (1826–1898), Canadian politician
- John Gunn (Australian writer) (born 1925), Australian author
- John Gunn (New South Wales politician) (1860–1910), Australian politician
- John Oliver Gunn Jr. (1939–2010), American race car driver
- John R. Gunn (1877–1956), American religious figure
- Jon Gunn (born 1973), American film director
- Joyce Rugg Gunn (1914 – after 1976), British lawyer and court official
- Judy Gunn (1915–1991), British actress
- Julien Gunn (1877–1948), American lawyer and politician
- Karen Gunn (born 1962), New Zealand cricketer
- Kat Gunn (born 1988), American esports player, cosplayer and TV personality
- Kelsey Gunn, American actress
- Ken Gunn (1909–1991), Scottish footballer
- Kirsty Gunn (born 1960), New Zealand-born British writer
- Lance Gunn (born 1970), American football player
- Lee F. Gunn (1942–2025), United States Navy admiral
- Leigh Gunn (born 1980), Australian–Filipino footballer
- Levi J. Gunn (1830–1916), American politician
- Lewis Gunn (1918–2014), Scottish-born Canadian cricketer
- Liz Gunn, New Zealand anti-vaccination activist
- Luke Gunn (born 1985), British male track and field athlete
- Lynn Gunn (born 1994), American musician
- Mabel Gunn (1890–1970), New Zealand nurse and hospital matron
- Maja Gunn (born 1978), Swedish fashion designer
- Marc Gunn (born 1972), American musician and podcaster
- Margaret Gunn (1889–1989), Canadian activist
- Margo Gunn (born 1956), English actress
- Mark Gunn (born 1968), American football player
- Mark Gunn (screenwriter), American screenwriter and producer
- Marquies Gunn (born 1983), American gridiron football player
- Martha Gunn (1726–1815), British dipper
- Mary Gunn (1899–1989), South African librarian and biographer
- Matt Gunn (born 1972), American writer and actor
- Michael Gunn (born 1995), Rugby player
- Michael Ralph Thomas Gunn (1840–1901), Irish businessman and theatre manager
- Mike Gunn (born 1964), British comedian
- Moira Gunn, American podcaster
- Moses Gunn (1929–1993), American stage and screen actor
- Nathan Gunn (born 1970), American opera singer
- Nathon Gunn (born 1973), Canadian entrepreneur
- Neil Gunn (sailor) (1945–2016), Canadian sailor
- Neil M. Gunn (1891–1973), Scottish novelist, critic, and dramatist
- Niall Gunn, Irish racecar driver
- Nicholas Gunn (born 1968), English musician
- Otis B. Gunn (1828–1901), American politician
- Pappy Gunn (1899–1957), American naval aviator
- Peter Gunn (politician) (1864–1927), Canadian politician
- Peter Gunn (actor) (born 1963), English actor
- Philip Gunn (born 1963), American politician
- Rachael Gunn (born 1987), Australian breakdancer
- Raymond Gunn (1904–1931), lynching victim
- Richard Gunn (boxer) (1871–1961), English boxer
- Richard Gunn (actor) (born 1975), American actor
- Rick Gunn (born 1958), American politician from North Carolina
- Robert Marcus Gunn (1850–1909), Scottish ophthalmologist
- Robin Jones Gunn (born 1955), American writer
- Ronald Campbell Gunn (1808–1881), Australian politician
- Ross Gunn (1897–1966), American physicist
- Ross Gunn (racing driver) (born 1997), British racing driver
- Russell Gunn (born 1971), American jazz trumpeter
- S. William A. Gunn (1926–2022), Canadian surgeon
- Sandy Gunn (1919–1944), WW2 Scottish pilot and prisoner of war
- Sandy Gunn (rugby union) (1890–1980), Scotland international rugby union player
- Sean Gunn (born 1974), American actor
- Sean Gunn (swimmer) (born 1993), Zimbabwean swimmer
- Selskar Gunn (1883–1944), Public health administrator
- Shaun Gunn (born 1998), Scottish rugby union player
- Shirley Gunn (born 1955), South African activist
- Simon Gunn (rugby union) (born 1977), New Zealand rugby union player
- Simon Gunn (historian) (born 1954), British historian
- Skye Gunn (born 1997), American soccer player
- Stephen K. Gunn (born 1954), Canadian businessman
- Steve Gunn (musician) (born 1977), American singer-songwriter
- Steve Gunn (ice hockey) (1890–1914), Canadian ice hockey player
- Steven Gunn (historian), English historian and academic
- Susan Gunn (born 1965), British artist
- Terry Gunn (1935–2021), English cricketer
- Thom Gunn (1929–2004), English poet
- Thomas Butler Gunn (1826–1904), English born illustrator and writer
- Thomas Gunn (1843–1908), English cricketer
- Tim Gunn (born 1953), American author, academic, and television personality
- Tom Gunn (1890–1925), Chinese-American aviator
- Tommy Gunn (actor) (born 1967), American pornographic actor and director
- Trey Gunn (born 1960), American musician
- W.R. Gunn, American theatre architect
- Walter T. Gunn (1879–1956), American judge
- Watts Gunn (1995–1994), American amateur golfer
- Wendell Wilkie Gunn (born 1942), American activist and executive
- Westside Gunn (born 1982), American rapper
- Will A. Gunn, American military member
- William Alphonsus Gunn (1760–1806), English evangelical cleric
- William Archer Gunn (1914–2003), Australian grazier
- William Gunn (cricketer) (1858–1921), English sportsman
- William Gunn (writer) (1750–1841), English clergyman and writer
- William Gunn (runner) (1907–1994), Scottish athlete
- William Gunn (physician) (1855–1922), African-American physician
- William T. Gunn (1867–1930), Canadian Protestant clergy

== Fictional characters ==
- Ben Gunn, fictional character in Robert Louis Stevenson's novel Treasure Island (1883)
- Charles Gunn, fictional character in the 1999 TV series Angel
- Peter Gunn, private eye protagonist of Peter Gunn, a 1958–1963 American television series
- Raymond "Ray" Gunn, a fictional detective, the titular character of the 2026 animated film Ray Gunn
- Tommy Gunn, fictional character in the 1990 movie Rocky V

== See also ==
- Gunn (disambiguation)
- Gunn (given name)
- Clan Gunn, Scottish clan
- Westside Gunn, American Rapper
