= William Gunn =

William or Bill Gunn may refer to:

- Bill Gunn (footballer, born 1932) (1932–1991), Australian rules footballer for South Melbourne and Williamstown
- Bill Gunn (footballer, born 1899) (1899–1970), Australian rules footballer for South Melbourne
- Bill Gunn (Queensland politician, born 1895) (1895–1970), member of the Queensland Legislative Assembly for Wynnum
- Bill Gunn (Queensland politician, born 1920) (1920–2001), Australian politician and former Queensland Deputy Premier
- Bill Gunn (Massachusetts politician), Massachusetts candidate for United States House of Representatives
- Bill Gunn (writer) (1934–1989), American playwright, novelist, actor and film director
- Billy Gunn (born 1963), American professional wrestler
- Will A. Gunn, American lawyer, former officer in the American armed forces
- William Gunn (cricketer) (1858–1921), English Test cricketer and footballer
- William Gunn (writer) (1750–1841), English miscellaneous writer
- William Gunn (physician) (1855–1922), Florida's first black doctor
- William T. Gunn (1867–1930), United Church of Canada minister
- William Alphonsus Gunn (1760–1806), English evangelical cleric
- William Archer Gunn (1914–2003), better known as "Bill" or Sir William Gunn, Australian pastoralist
- William Gunn (runner) (1907–1994), Scottish runner

== See also ==
- Bill Gunn Dam, structure at Lake Dyer in Australia, named for the politician
