= Gunn =

Gunn may refer to:

== Places ==
- Gunn City, Missouri, a village
- Gunn, Northern Territory, outer suburb of Darwin
- Gunn, Alberta, Canada, a hamlet
- Gunn Valley, a mountain valley in British Columbia, Canada
- Gun Lake (British Columbia), a Canadian lake formerly spelled Gunn Lake
- Gunn Lake, a lake in Minnesota
- Lake Gunn, New Zealand
- Gunn River, New Zealand
- Gunn Peaks, Palmer Land, Antarctica
- Mount Gunn, Victoria Land, Antarctica
- Mount Gunn (New Zealand), Southland, New Zealand
- 65P/Gunn, a periodic comet
- 18243 Gunn, an asteroid

== Other uses ==
- Gunn (film), 1967 film based on the 1958–1961 television series Peter Gunn
- Gunn (given name)
- Gunn (surname)
- Clan Gunn, Highland Scots clan of Norse origin
- Gunn High School, high school in Palo Alto, California
- Gunn diode, diode used in high-frequency electronics
- Gunns, Tasmanian company

== See also ==
- Gunnr, one of the valkyries in Norse mythology
- Justice Gunn (disambiguation)
