= List of honorary fellows of Peterhouse, Cambridge =

This is a list of Honorary Fellows of Peterhouse, Cambridge. A list of current honorary fellows is published on the college's website at Fellows by Seniority.

- Sir Hugh Beach
- Alfred Brendel
- Malcolm Budd
- Elizabeth Butler-Sloss, Baroness Butler-Sloss
- Sir Ian Corder
- Adrian Dixon
- Sir Richard Eyre
- Sir Nicholas Fenn
- Chan Gunn
- Ian Hacking
- Angela Hewitt
- Michael Howard, Baron Howard of Lympne
- Bridget Kendall
- Sir John Kendrew
- Sir Aaron Klug
- Michael Levitt
- Anthony Lloyd, Baron Lloyd of Berwick
- Michael Loewe
- Denis Mack Smith
- Sir Noel Malcolm
- Simon McBurney
- Sir Sam Mendes
- Sir Christopher Meyer
- Sir Declan Morgan
- Michael Moriarty
- Anthony Nightingale
- Karen O'Brien
- Joseph E. Pesce
- Klaus Roth
- Sir Ernest Ryder
- Edward Shils
- Nicholas Stern, Baron Stern of Brentford
- James Stirling
- Sir John Meurig Thomas
- Martin Thomas, Baron Thomas of Gresford
- Dame Mitsuko Uchida
- David Wilson, Baron Wilson of Tillyorn
- Sir David Wright
- Sir Tony Wrigley
