= John Gunn (geologist) =

British geologist (1801–1890)

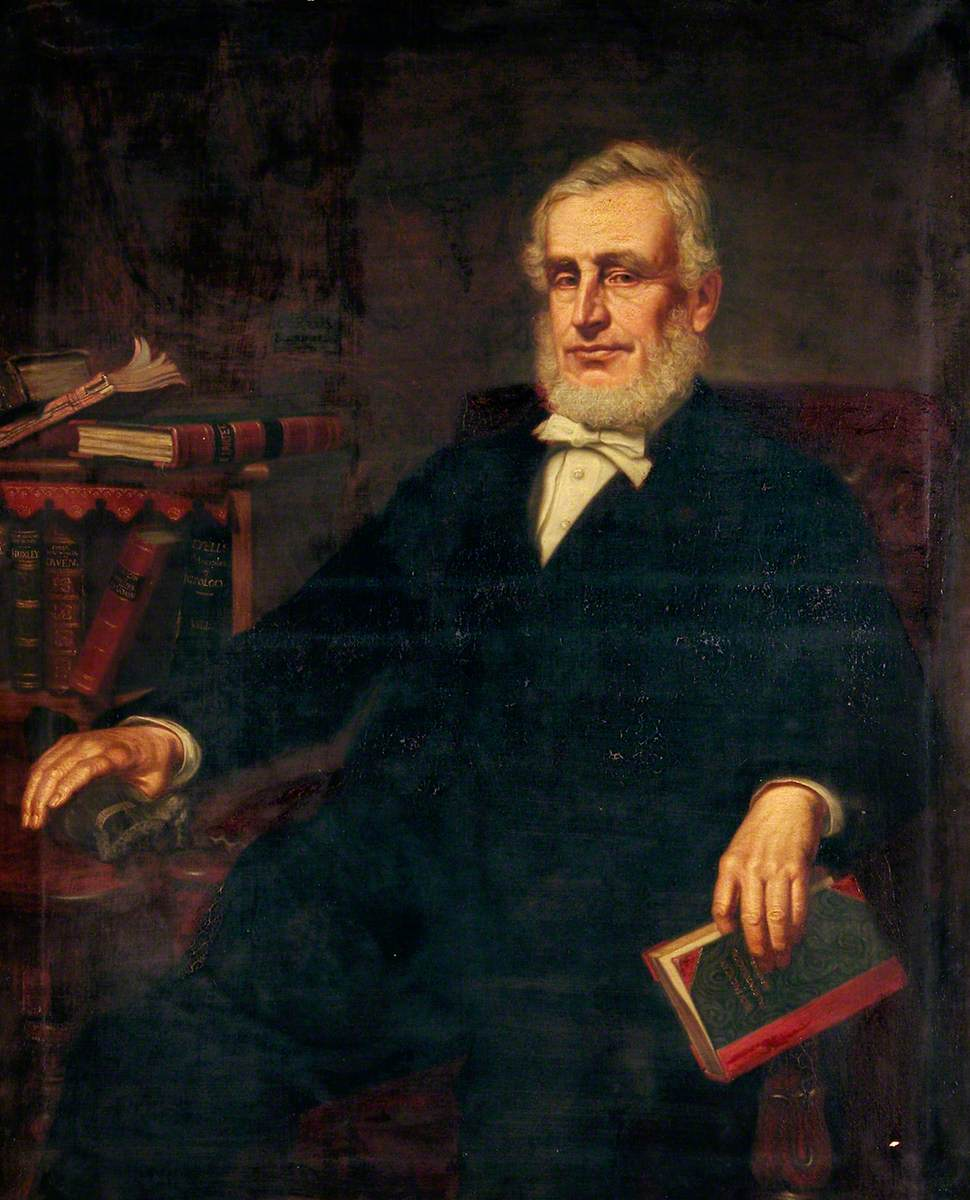
John Gunn

John Gunn (Norwich, 1801–1890) was an English cleric and geologist, known for his work on the Cromer Forest Bed. He also established the Norwich Geological Society with John Ellor Taylor in 1864.

== Life ==
He was the son of the Rev. William Gunn of Irstead, Norfolk. He matriculated at Exeter College, Oxford in 1819, graduating B.A. in 1823 and M.A. in 1827. He became a barrister at Lincoln's Inn, in 1827.

In 1829 Gunn was ordained. He became vicar of Barton Turf, and rector of Irstead. He married in 1830 Harriet Turner, daughter of Dawson Turner.
