= Anthony Norris =

Anthony Norris may refer to:

- Anthony Norris (born 1963), American wrestler and football player, ring name Ahmed Johnson
- Antony Norris (1711–1786), English antiquarian
