= Peter Murray =

Peter Murray may refer to:

- Peter Murray (architectural writer) (born 1944), British architectural journalist
- Peter Murray (art historian) (1920–1992), professor of history of art
- Peter Murray (arts administrator), founding director of Yorkshire Sculpture Park
- Peter L. Murray, American legal scholar
- Pete Murray (Australian singer-songwriter) (born 1969), Australian singer-songwriter
- Pete Murray (DJ) (born 1925), British radio and television presenter
- Pete Murray (American musician), American musician and singer-songwriter
- Peter J. Murray (born 1951), retired mathematics teacher and children's author
- Peter Murray (immunologist) (born 1965), Australian-American immunologist and biochemist
- Peter Marshall Murray (1888–1969), president of the National Medical Association, 1932–1933
- Peter Murray (rugby union) (1884–1968), New Zealand rugby union player and politician
- Peter Murray (American businessman), American sports business executive
- Peter Murray (speedway rider) (born 1948), English motorcycle speedway rider

== See also ==
- Peter Murray-Rust (born 1941), chemist
- Peter Murray-Willis (1910–1995), English cricketer
- Peta Murray, Australian writer
