= John Skypp =

British bishop (c. 1495–1552)

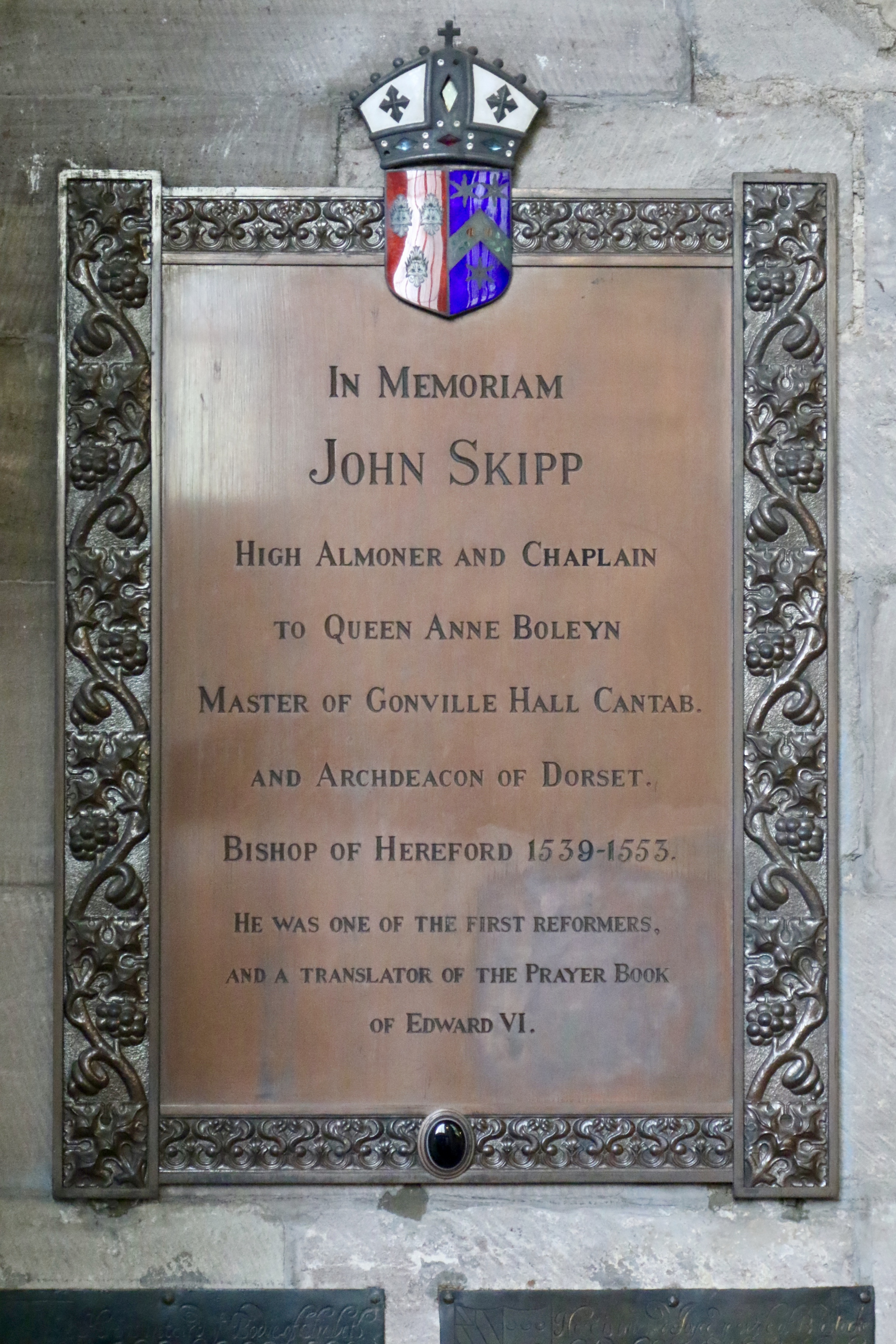
Memorial in Hereford Cathedral

John Skypp (c. 1495 – 1552) was the Bishop of Hereford from 1539 until 1552, and the almoner of Queen Anne Boleyn.

Born in Irstead, Norfolk of humble parents, Edmund and Alice Skyppe who both died in 1507, he graduated from Gonville Hall, Cambridge in 1518, and later was Master of Gonville Hall. He embarked on a clerical career that saw him become Vicar of Newington, Shepway in Essex. Skypp went to London to the court where he met with Boleyns and the reformers in the church. Skypp was well-read and learned in the scriptures, a biblical scholar and fundamental interpretationist, he used his knowledge of the Bible to the furtherance of his own Protestant views.

Skypp was almoner to Anne Boleyn at the height of her power. On the dissolution of the monasteries, he managed to persuade Queen Anne that all proceeds should go to charity and education of the poor, a cause Anne took to Henry. It may have been a source of intense rivalry with Thomas Cromwell and a contributory factor in her downfall during a parallel with the Persian Xerxes's 'wicked minister'. For courageous as Queen Anne Boleyn was, she recruited Archbishop Cranmer, another reformist, against Cromwell's aims. Henry VIII knew that he needed the repeal of Act of Succession 1534, which only parliament could have done, a fortnight later.

He held the benefice as Vicar of Thaxted in Essex from 1534 to 1539. He served as Archdeacon of Suffolk before elevation to the episcopate.

He was buried in the churchyard of St Mary Mounthaw, a church in the City of London which was destroyed during the Great Fire of London.

== Skypp's sermon ==
On Passion Sunday, 2 April 1536, Skypp preached a sermon from John chapter 8, verse 46 on the theme of "Quis ex vobis arguet me de peccato?" or "Which of you can convict me of sin?". Skypp rose defiantly to defend the ravages of the agents of the Vicar-General on behalf of his mistress. He warned against the "evil counsellors" making scarcely veiled references to Cromwell's role as chief enforcer. Skypp was a liturgical traditionalist in the ancient customs of the church, and the maintenance of the universities. Skypp elaborately embellished the symbolism borrowing the reformist Lutheran method of damning with faint praise the venal practices of the church. He clearly believed the Crown was motivated by greed; it was enough for onlookers to imagine sowing the seeds of doubt.

For Skypp, the Old Testament King Solomon the Wise was rich but sensual, having taken too many wives and concubines to satisfy his carnal appetites. Solomon, like Henry VIII, was a towering figure in Jewish history, who had risked his kingdom for 'fool's gold.' Alison Weir postulates that Skypp may have seen Solomon in the stained glass windows of King's College, Cambridge. Cromwell accused the Queen's almoner of 'preaching seditious doctrines and slandering the King's Highness, his counsellors, his lords and nobles and his whole parliament.'
