= Harvard Legal Aid Bureau =

Student-run legal clinic

- Headquarters: Cambridge, Massachusetts
- No. of offices: 1
- No. of lawyers: 9
- Major practice areas: housing law, family law, government benefits, and employment law
- Date founded: 1913
- Website: harvardlegalaid.org

The Harvard Legal Aid Bureau's offices at 23 Everett Street

The Harvard Legal Aid Bureau (HLAB) is the oldest student-run legal services office in the United States, founded in 1913. The bureau is one of three honors societies at the law school, along with the Harvard Law Review and the Board of Student Advisers.

Notable members include Supreme Court Justice William J. Brennan, Massachusetts Governor Deval Patrick, activist and First Lady Michelle Obama, Attorney General Loretta Lynch, Berkshire Hathaway's Charlie Munger and law professors Erwin Chemerinsky and Laurence Tribe.

== Overview ==
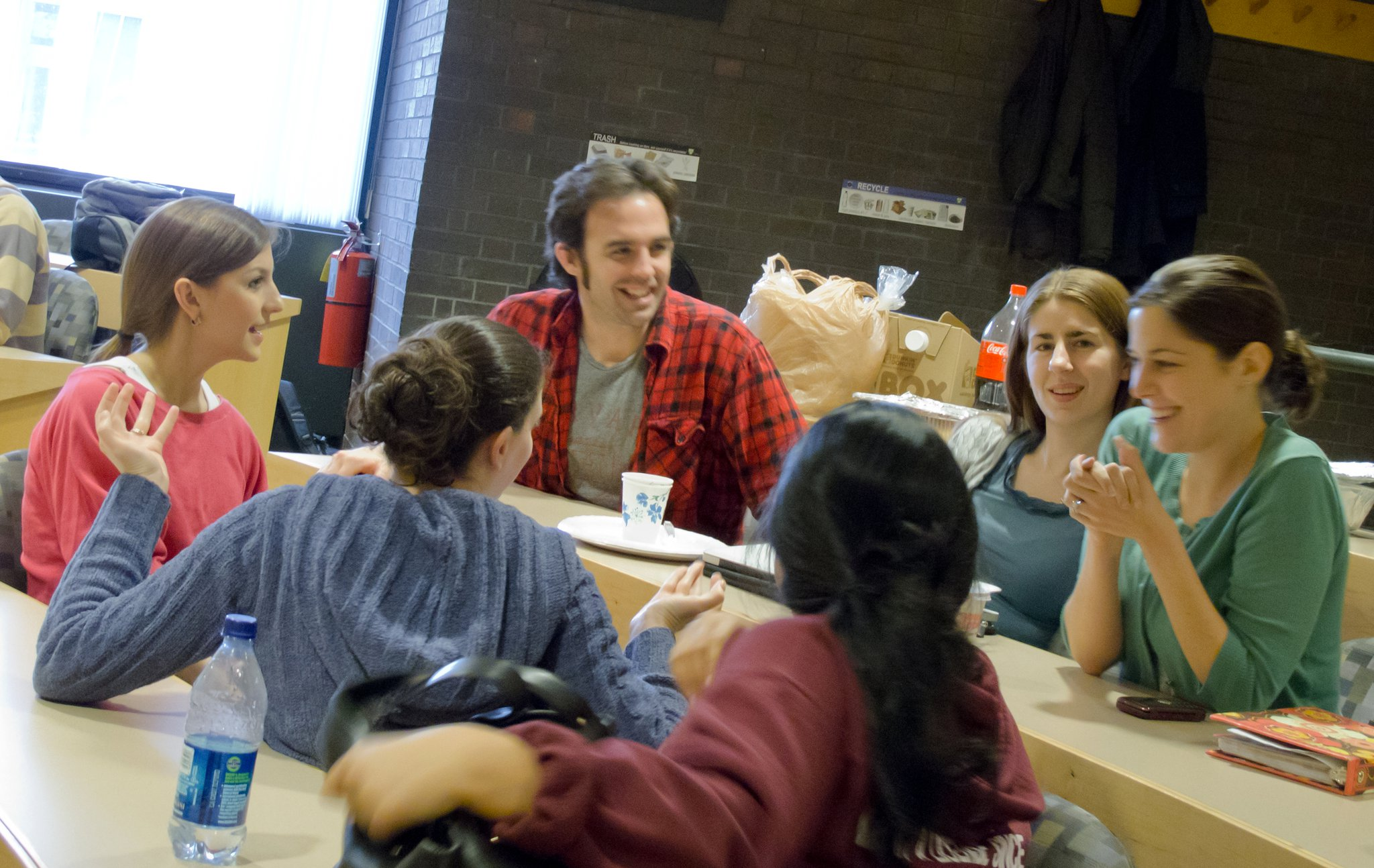
HLAB Members discuss policy at the annual spring retreat.

The Harvard Legal Aid Bureau was formed in 1913 "to render legal aid and assistance gratuitously to all persons who may appear worthy thereof and who from poverty are unable to procure it." Campbell Bosson was the Bureau's first chairman and Malcolm M. McDermott was its first secretary. They were succeeded by Charles B. Rugg and Clarence B. Randall, respectively. On November 8, 1913, Rugg tried the association's first court case.

Members of the bureau practice under Rule 3:03 of the Massachusetts Supreme Judicial Court, which allows them to appear in court as counsel of record for low-income clients. The bureau currently employs nine practicing attorneys who train and supervise members.

Bureau members practice in the following general practice areas: housing law, family law, government benefits, and employment law. Students usually focus primarily on housing or family law. Within these practices, students work on matters such as eviction defense, domestic violence, child custody and support, divorce, social security benefits, wage and hour violations, and employment discrimination cases.

== Alumni ==
Prominent alumni of the Harvard Legal Aid Bureau include:

- Hon. William J. Brennan, Associate Justice of the United States Supreme Court
- Michelle Obama, First Lady of the United States
- Loretta Lynch, United States Attorney General
- Erwin Chemerinsky, constitutional law scholar and founding Dean of the University of California, Irvine School of Law
- Hon. Ojetta Rogeriee Thompson, United States Court of Appeals for the First Circuit
- Hon. Frank M. Coffin, United States Court of Appeals for the First Circuit
- Hon. Matthew Kennelly, United States District Judge for the Northern District of Illinois
- Hon. William Schwarzer, senior United States District Judge for the Northern District of California
- Hon. Jed Rakoff, United States District Judge for the Southern District of New York
- Hon. Emily C. Hewitt, Chief Judge of the United States Court of Federal Claims
- Hon. Fernande R.V. Duffly, Justice of the Supreme Judicial Court of Massachusetts
- Hon. Daniel Joseph O'Hern, Justice on the New Jersey Supreme Court
- Stephen W. Preston, General Counsel, Central Intelligence Agency and former General Counsel of the Navy
- Will A. Gunn, General Counsel, U.S. Department of Veterans Affairs
- Charles Munger, Vice-Chairman of Berkshire Hathaway and business partner of Warren Buffett
- Alan Khazei, CEO of Be the Change, U.S. Senate candidate
- Raj Goyle, State Congressman representing the 87th district of Kansas.
- Joseph P. Kennedy III, U.S. Representative for Massachusetts 4th Congressional District.
- Joseph Anthony Califano, Jr, 12th United States Secretary of Health, Education, and Welfare
- David L. Kirp, Professor of Public Policy, University of California, Berkeley
- Jeffrey Steingarten, author and food editor of Vogue Magazine
- Prof. Peter Murray, Harvard Law School Professor
- Ruthzee Louijeune, Boston City Council President
