= Pete Murray =

Pete Murray may refer to:

- Pete Murray (Australian singer-songwriter) (born 1969), Australian singer-songwriter and guitarist
- Pete Murray (DJ) (born 1925), British radio and television presenter and actor
- Pete Murray (American musician), American rock singer

== See also ==
- Peter Murray (disambiguation)
