= Harriet Gunn =

English artist and lithographer (1806–1869)

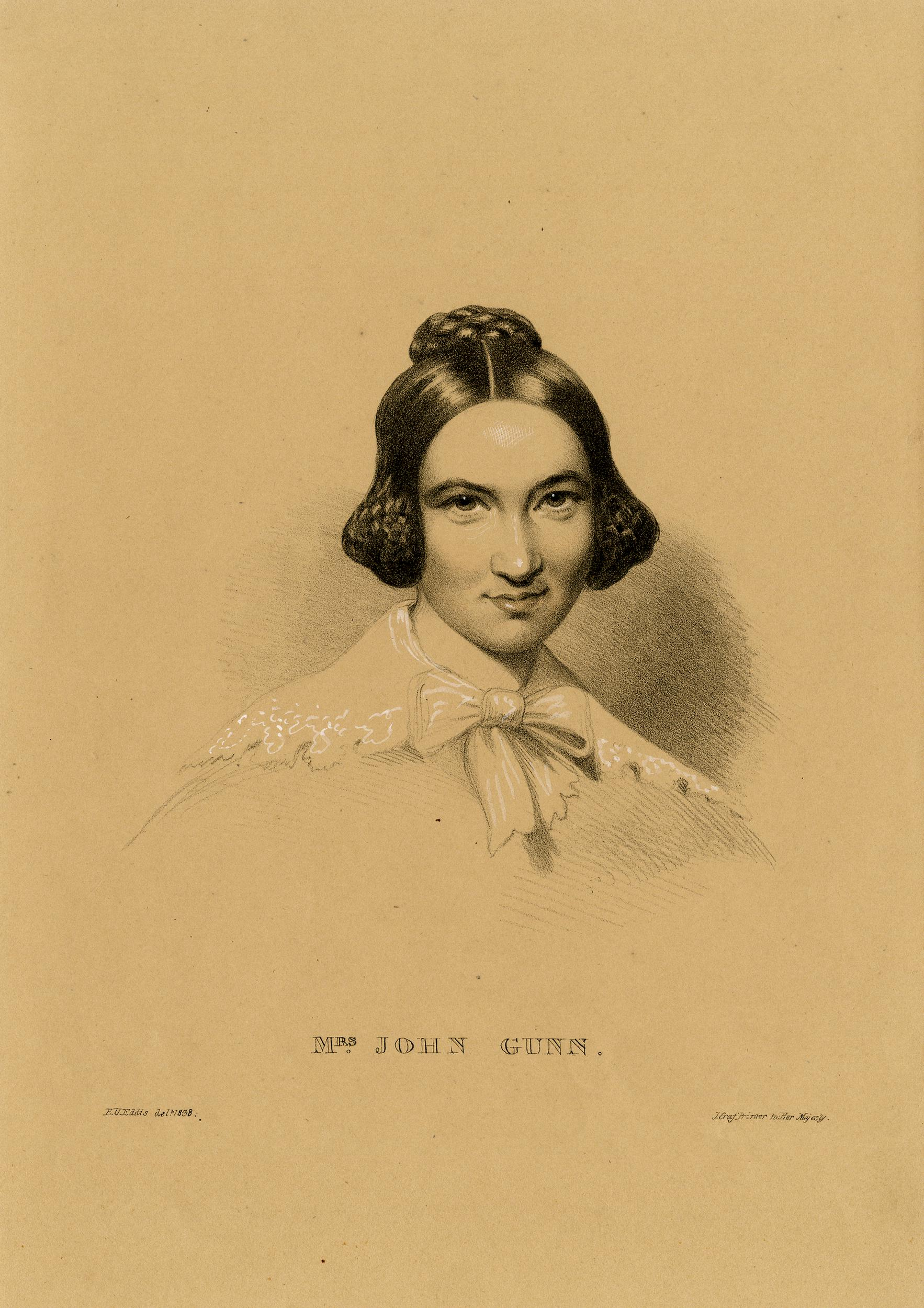
- Gunn c.1840, engraved by her sister Hannah Sarah Brightwen after Eden Upton Eddis.
- Born: Harriet Turner; 1806
- Died: September 1869 (aged 62–63)
- Education: Artistic training by John Sell Cotman
- Occupations: Lithographer; writer
- Known for: Reproductions of medieval rood screen artwork
- Spouse: John Gunn
- Parent(s): Dawson Turner; Mary Dawson Turner
- Family: Engraver Hannah Sarah Brightwen (sister)

Harriet Gunn (née Turner, 1806 – 1869) was an English illustrator and lithographer who specialised in illustrations of ecclesiastical art. Beginning as an illustrator of antiquarian books and travel writing, she produced portraits for publications and is noted for her personal project of reproducing medieval rood screens. She was also a writer, anonymously publishing a book on church polity and having her letters printed as a travel account.

== Early life and family ==
She was born Harriet Turner in 1806, the fourth daughter of polymath Dawson Turner and his wife Mary, née Palgrave, an artist and draughtswoman. Along with her sisters, Maria, Elizabeth, Mary Anne, Harriet, Hannah, and Eleanor, she received artistic training from engraver John Sell Cotman from 1812. Hannah Sarah Turner continued her artistic career after her marriage to banker Thomas Brightwen, producing lithographs as Hannah Sarah Brightwen.

== Artistic career ==
=== Topographical History of Norfolk ===
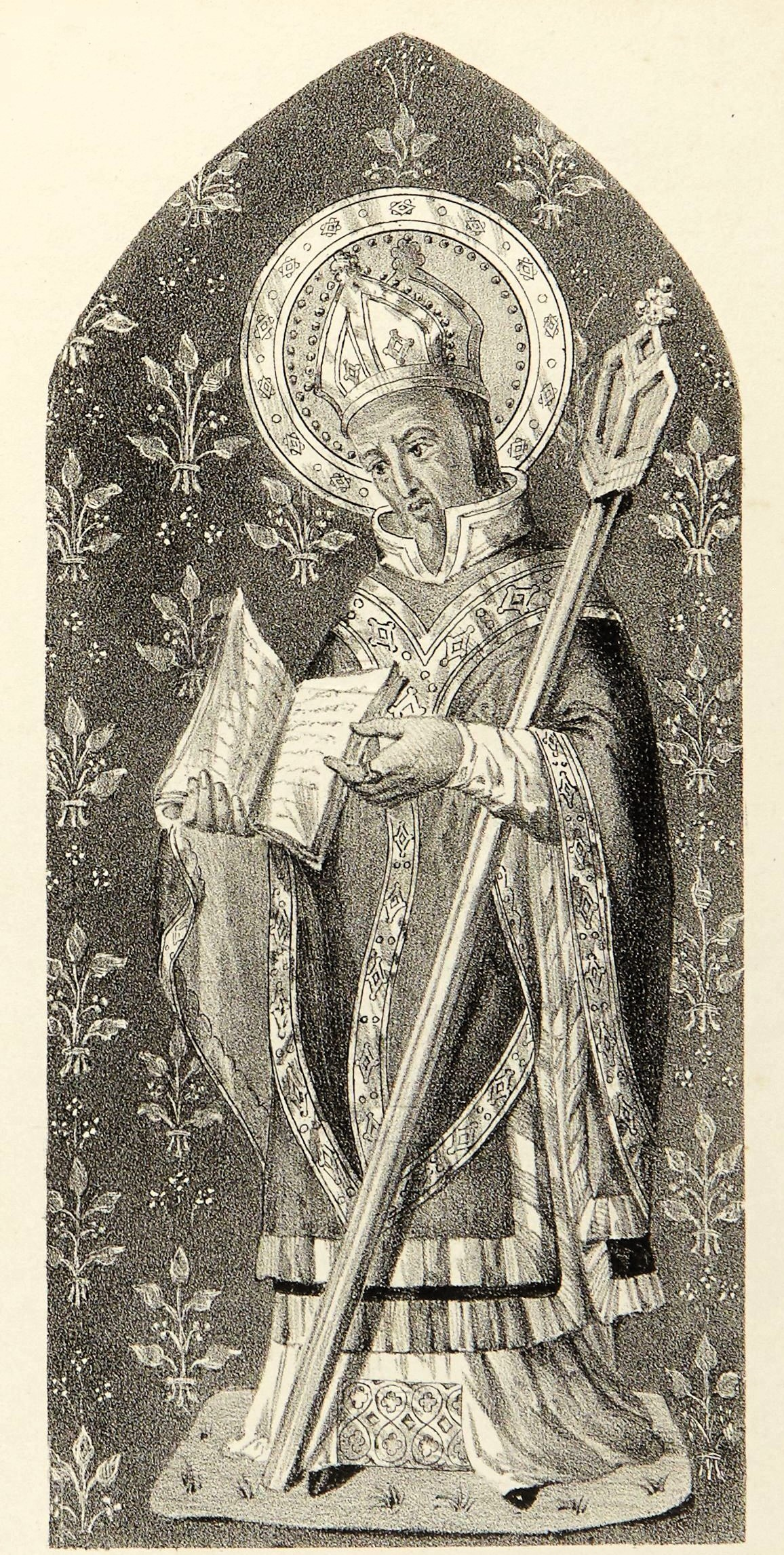
Reproduction of Ranworth rood screen by Gunn, 1839

Around 1810, Dawson Turner began a project supplying extra illustrations for Francis Blomefield’s An Essay Towards A Topographical History of the County of Norfolk. Harriet and her mother and sisters contributed the bulk of the illustrations, supplying over 4000 drawings between them.

=== Account of a Tour in Normandy ===
In 1820 the family produced a collaborative two-volume Account of a Tour in Normandy, drawing on letters and journals from their family tour in Normandy of 1818. Mary, Cotman, and Harriet and her sisters provided the illustrations.

=== Reproductions of ecclesiastical art ===
On 27 April 1830, Harriet married John Gunn, rector of Irstead, Great Yarmouth, and amateur geologist and archaeologist. The paired toured Norfolk in pursuit of their interests, Harriet producing illustrations of architecture and ecclesiastical art. Her particular area of interest was rood screens, which preserved rare samples of medieval painting. With the help of her sisters Hannah and Mary Anne, she produced about 250 drawings of this underrepresented antiquarian feature. She exhibited her drawings at the annual congress of the Royal Archaeological Institute in 1847 and at a temporary museum at the Swan Hotel, Norwich.

== Writing ==
The anonymous 1833 book Conversations on Church Polity, by A Lady is attributed to Gunn.

In 1834, Dawson Turner edited and printed Letters Written During a Four Days’ Tour in Holland from Gunn's letters without her prior knowledge.

== Death ==
She died in September 1869.
