= Steve Gunn =

Stephen, Steven or Steve Gunn may refer to:

- Stephen K. Gunn (born 1954), Canadian businessman
- Steven Gunn (historian) Oxford historian
- Steve Gunn (ice hockey) (1890–1914), ice hockey player
- Steve Gunn (musician), New York guitarist and singer-songwriter
- Steve Gunn, DJ on Timeless satellite ratio station
