= Dawson Turner =

English banker, botanist and antiquary (1775–1858)

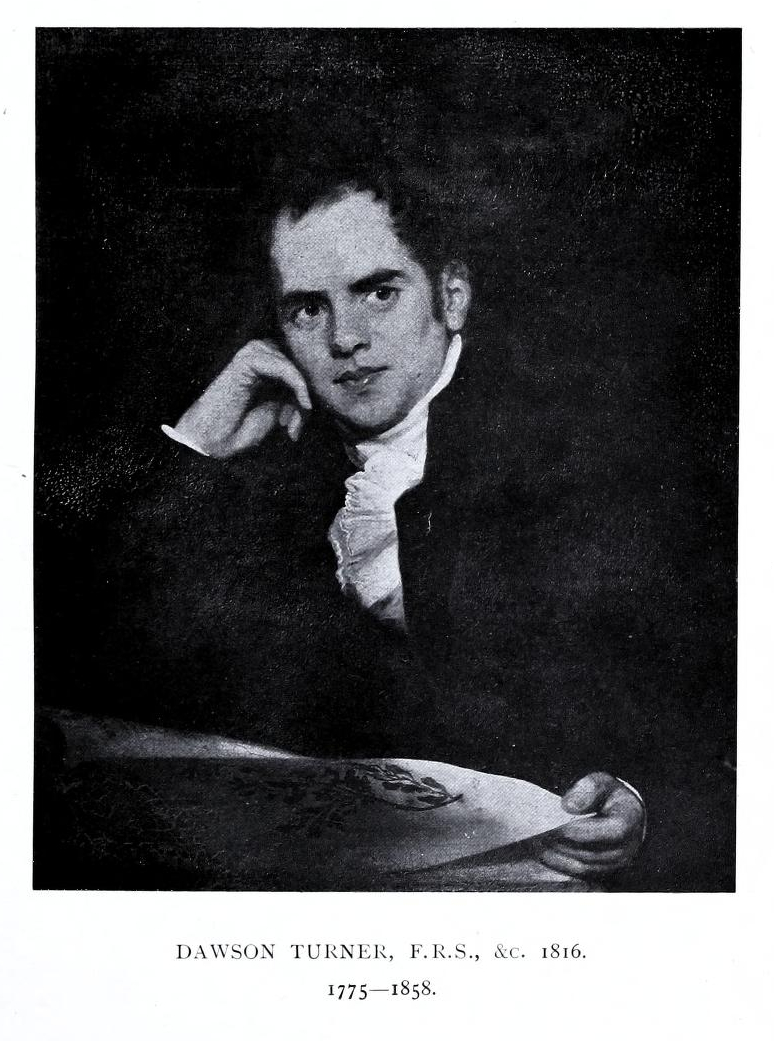
Portrait of Turner, c. 1816

Dawson Turner FRS FSA (18 October 1775 – 21 June 1858) was an English banker, botanist and antiquary. He specialized in the botany of cryptogams and was the father-in-law of the botanist William Jackson Hooker and of the historian Francis Palgrave.

== Life ==
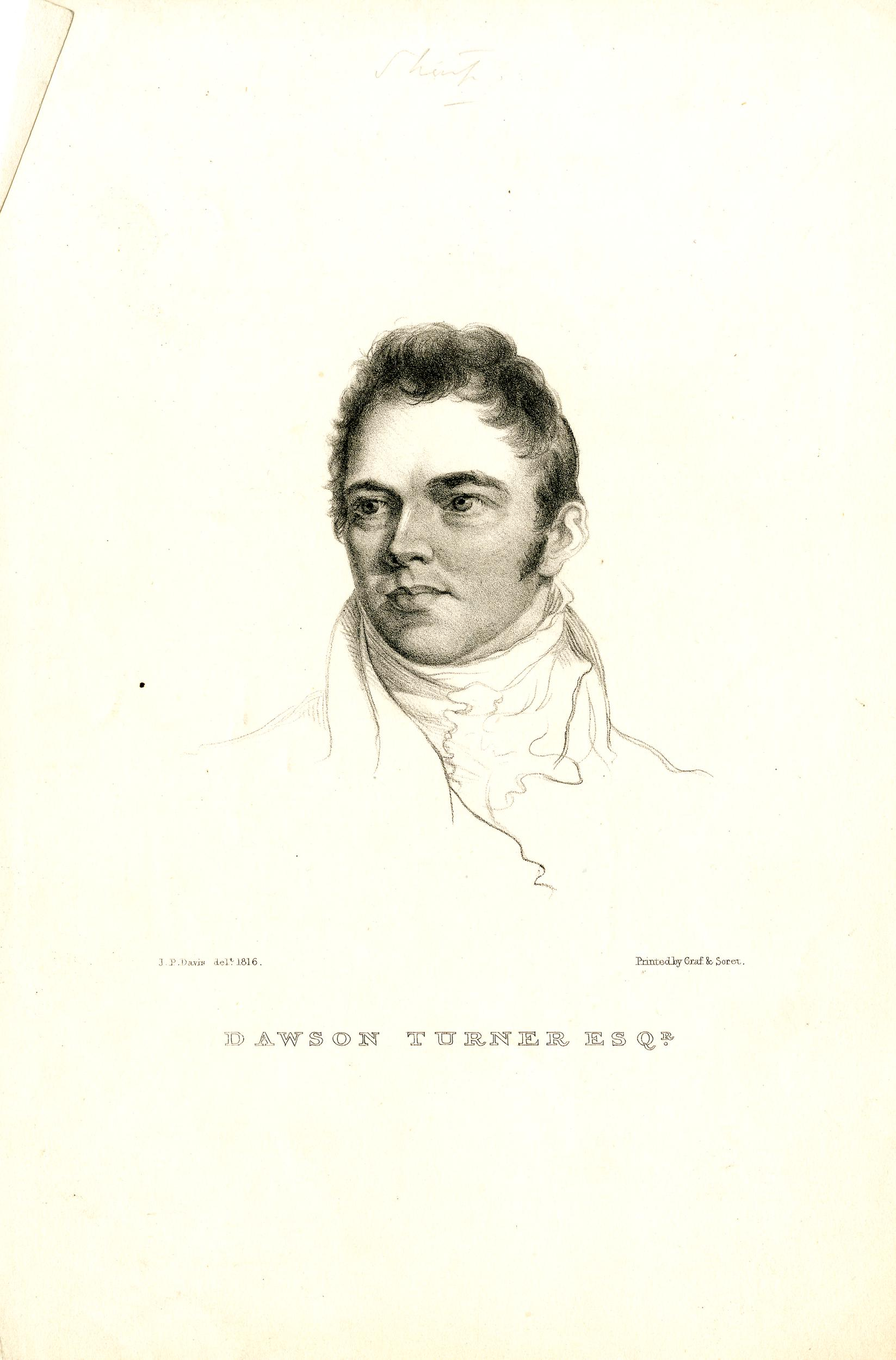
Print made by: Hannah Sarah Brightwen, After: John Philip Davis. British Museum

Turner was the son of James Turner, head of the Gurney and Turner's Yarmouth Bank and Elizabeth Cotman, the only daughter of the mayor of Yarmouth, John Cotman. He was educated at North Walsham Grammar School (now Paston College), Norfolk and at Barton Bendish as a pupil of the botanist Robert Forby. He then went to Pembroke College, Cambridge, where the Master was his uncle Rev. Joseph Turner. He however left without a degree due to his father's terminal illness. In 1796, he joined his father's bank.

After becoming a banker, he took a more intensive interest in botany in leisure time, collecting specimens in the field. In 1794, Turner offered to help James Sowerby with specimens. Turner published a number of books and collaborated with other botanists. In December 1802, he was elected a Fellow of the Royal Society. In 1816, he was elected a foreign member of the Royal Swedish Academy of Sciences.

Through his first wife Mary, he met Captain George Manby, amateur artist, inventor and barrack-master of Yarmouth. They corresponded frequently over the next 50 years.

By 1820, his interest in botany had been replaced by an interest in antiquities. He and his children were taught drawing by renowned Norfolk artist John Sell Cotman who became a good friend. They travelled to Normandy together and collaborated on a book, Architectural Antiquities of Normandy, published in 1822, with Cotman providing the etchings. Another friend was George Borrow the novelist who gifted Turner a letter in 1842 from Antonio Salazar, a Gypsy of Cordova.

Turner died in 1858 and is buried in Brompton Cemetery, London.

== Bibliography ==
Among the published works of Dawson Turner are:

- Synopsis of British Fuci 1802
- Muscologia Hibernicae Spicilegium (Irish Moss Ferns) 1804
- Botanist's Guide through England and Wales with Weston Dillwyn 1805
- Annals of Botany - nine articles 1800-1808
- Account of a Tour of Normandy 1820

== Family ==
In 1796, the year he joined his father's bank, Turner married Mary (1774–17 March 1850), the daughter of William Palgrave of Norfolk. She became a notable portrait artist under her married name Mary Dawson Turner and 78 of her drawings (as etchings) are in the possession of the National Portrait Gallery in London. The couple had 11 children:

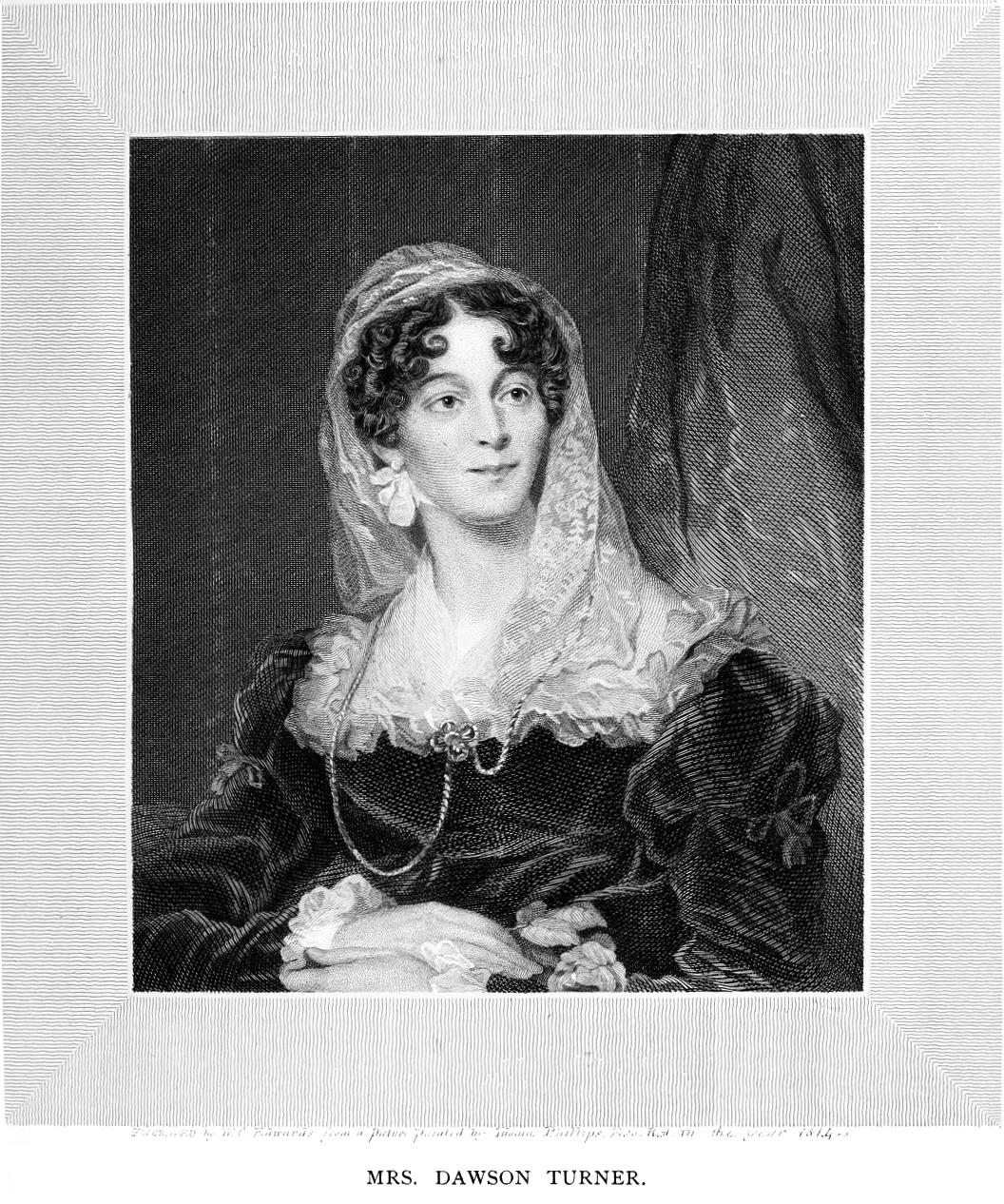
Mary Turner, engraved by W.C. Edwards from a painting made in 1814

- Maria Dawson Turner (1797–1872), married William Jackson Hooker, botanist; their son was Joseph Dalton Hooker, also a botanist.
- Elizabeth Turner (1799–1852), married Francis Palgrave (né Cohen), historian, who took the name Palgrave upon conversion to Christianity.
- Dawson Turner (1801 – 1806)
- Mary Anne Turner (1803 – 1874)
- Harriet Turner (1806–1869), engraver, married in 1830 John Gunn, clergyman and naturalist.
- Hannah Sarah Turner (1808 – ), engraver, married in 1839 Thomas Brightwen, banker.
- Dawson Turner (1809 – 1809)
- Katherine Turner (1810 – 1811)
- Eleanor Jane Turner (1811–1895), the youngest daughter, married William Jacobson, divine.
- Gurney Turner (1813 – 1848), whose son Dawson Turner played in the first international rugby match in 1871
- Dawson William Turner (1815-1885), educationalist.

By his first wife, Turner was father-in-law of Sir William Jackson Hooker, FRS and of Sir Francis Palgrave, FRS and the grandfather of Sir Joseph Dalton Hooker, FRS, the poet and critic Francis Turner Palgrave, and Sir Robert Harry Inglis Palgrave, FRS.

After his first wife's death in 1850, he married Rosamund Matilda Duff (d. 1863) at Gretna Green, the marriage being disapproved of by his family and banking partners. He left Yarmouth and moved to Barnes, and in 1853 retired to Lee Cottage, Old Brompton where he lived until his death. Turner's collections were sold off in auction by Sotheby in 1853 earning £4563 15s and another part in 1859 for £6558 9s.
