= William Gunn (writer) =

English clergyman and writer (1750–1841)

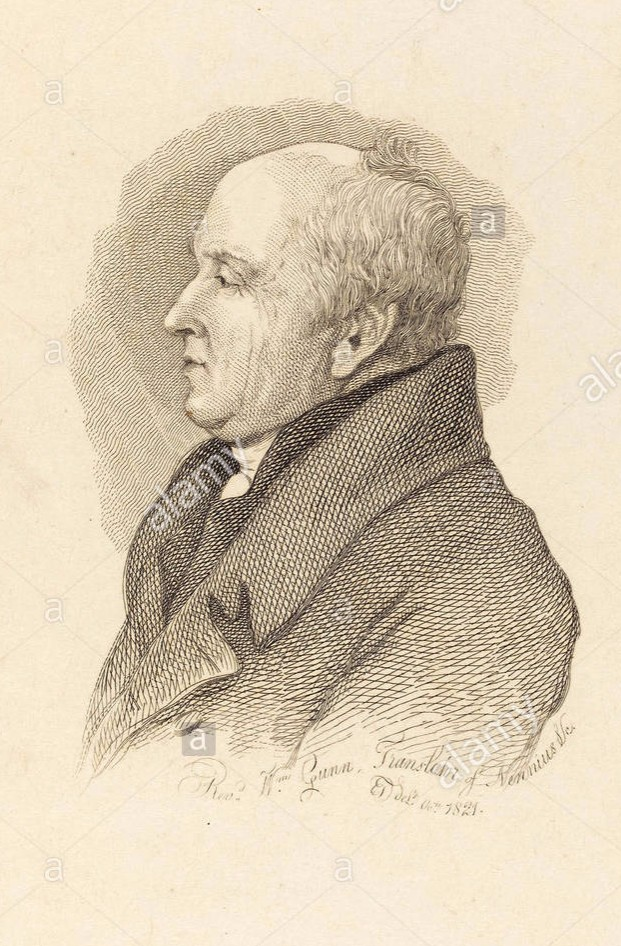
Portrait of William Gunn (1750–1841), English clergyman and writer.

William Gunn (1750–1841) was an English clergyman and miscellaneous writer.

== Life ==
Gunn was born on 7 April 1750 in Guildford, Surrey, the son of Alexander Gunn of Irstead, Norfolk. He attended Fletcher's private school at Kingston-upon-Thames for six years. In 1784 he entered Gonville and Caius College, Cambridge, as a sizar. He took holy orders, in 1784 became rector of Sloley, Norfolk, and in 1786 obtained the consolidated livings of Barton Turf and Irstead. The latter he resigned in 1829 in favour of John Gunn, on receiving the vicarage of Gorleston, Suffolk.

In 1795 he obtained the degree of B.D. as a 'ten-year man'. During a residence in Rome he obtained permission to search the Vatican and other libraries for manuscripts relating to the history of England, and published anonymously, as the result of his research, in 1803, a collection of Extracts from sixteenth-century state papers. In the Vatican he discovered a tenth-century manuscript of the Historia Brittonum, commonly ascribed to Nennius, which he printed in 1819 with an English version, facsimile of the original, notes, and illustrations (another edition of the translation only, with a few additions, was published by J. A. Giles in 1841). He died at Smallburgh, Norfolk, on 11 April 1841.

== Works ==
- (ed., anon.) Extracts, describing the ancient manner of placing the kingdom in military array : the various modes of defence adopted for its safety in periods of danger : and the evidence of foreigners as to the national character and personal bravery of the English : taken from original state papers of the sixteenth century collected on the continent, and hitherto inedited, 1803
- The "Historia Brittonum", commonly attributed to Nennius : from a manuscript lately discovered in the library of the Vatican Palace at Rome; edited in the tenth century by Mark the Hermit; with an English version, facsimile of the original, notes and illustrations by the Rev. W. Gunn, B. D. rector of Irstead, Norfolk, 1819.
- An Inquiry into the Origin and Influence of Gothic Architecture, 8vo, London: Longman, 1819.
- Cartonensia; or, an Historical and Critical Account of the Tapestries in the Palace of the Vatican; copied from the designs of Raphael, etc. To which are subjoined Remarks on the Causes which retard the Progress of the higher Departments of the Art of Painting in this Country, 8vo, London, 1831 (2nd ed., 1832).
- Michael Riviere, MA., “The Rev. William Gunn B.D., A Norfolk Parson on the Grand Tour”, in: Norfolk Archaeology, or miscellaneous tracts relating to the antiquities of the County of Norfolk, vol. XXXIII, 1965, Part III, pp.351-378, & Part IV, pp.379-398. A comprehensive account of his life with many of his letters and sections from his journals published for the first time.
- Exhibition Guide. The Archive of Revd William Gunn. An Exhibition to celebrate its Acquisition by the Norfolk Record Office 19 January- 28 February 2007.(downloadable PDF file http://www.archives.norfolk.gov.uk/view/NCC099325 )
- Last Will and Testament. William Gunn, Clerk, Smallburgh, 1841

Original register held by Norfolk Record Office (NRO: NCC, will register, Traxton, 203) (downloadable PDF file http://www.norfolkwills.co.uk/1841-001.pdf) (Transcript © Colin Gilbert)
