= St Mary Somerset =

Former church in London

St. Mary Somerset
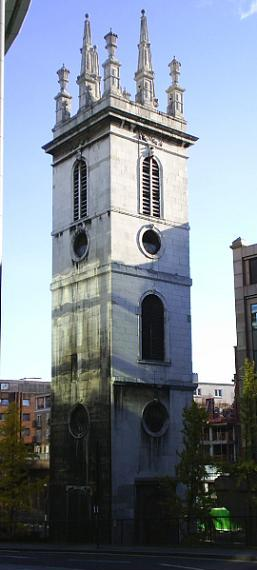
- Photo of the tower of St. Mary Somerset
- St. Mary Somerset
- 51°30′40.92″N 0°5′48.80″W
- OS grid reference: TQ 32163 80880
- Location: Queenhithe, City of London
- Country: England
- Denomination: Church of England

Architecture
- Architect: Sir Christopher Wren
- Style: Baroque
- Demolished: 1871

St. Mary Somerset was a church in the City of London first recorded in the twelfth century. Destroyed in the Great Fire of 1666, it was one of the 51 churches rebuilt by the office of Sir Christopher Wren. The tower is located in Upper Thames Street, the body of the church having been demolished in 1871.

== History ==
Pre-Fire London had 14 churches named after the Virgin Mary, six of which were rebuilt after the Fire. The derivation of Somerset is uncertain. It has been linked to Ralph de Somery, who is mentioned in records at the same time. It is also linked to Summer's Hithe, a small haven on the Thames, the banks of which would in medieval times have been closer to the church's site. The church is first mentioned in a deed during the reign of Richard I.

According to John Stow, in 1370, the Brabant weaver community was ordered by the Mayor to meet in the churchyard of St Mary Somerset for the purpose of hiring serving men, following disputes with the Flemish weavers. The latter were ordered to meet a safe distance away in the churchyard of St Laurence Pountney.

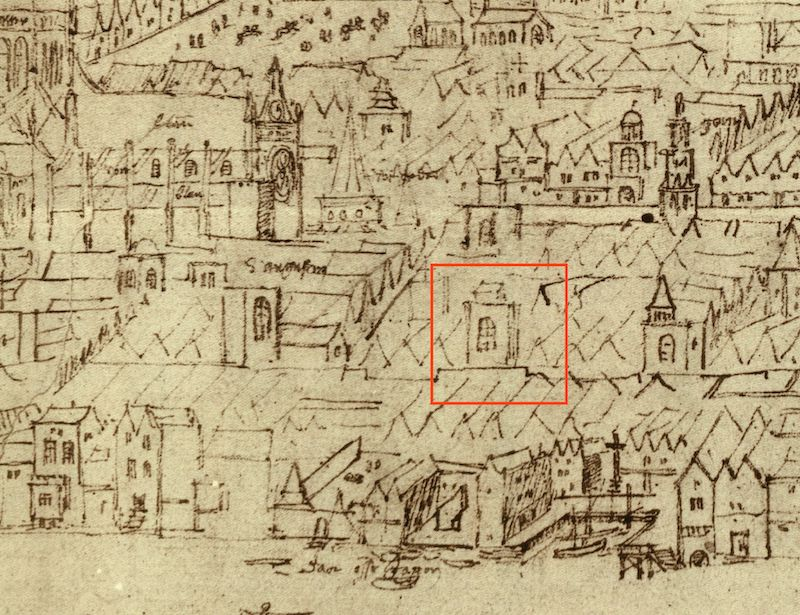
St Mary Somerset in the Wyngaerde panorama

After the Fire, the parish was combined with that of St Mary Mounthaw, which was not rebuilt. Building of the new church began in 1686 (one of the last five of the 51 to commence) and stopped in 1688 owing to the financial uncertainty associated with the Glorious Revolution. Rebuilding recommenced the next year and the church was finished in 1694, at a cost of £6579.

The parish was very poor, and it was one of only two churches (the other being St. Andrew-by-the-Wardrobe) for which Wren provided funds for the furnishings from the Coal Tax. The rebuilt church was smaller than its predecessor, for a strip of land was taken by the city to widen what was then Thames Street.

Bishop Gilbert Ironside, Chancellor of Oxford University, who defied James II in upholding the rights of Fellows, was buried here in 1701. His remains and his black marble tombstone were removed to Hereford Cathedral in 1867.

Late in the eighteenth century, the church had a reputation as Low Church. James Malcolm states in London Redivivum (1803): "When I mention that the late well-known Methodist Mr Gunn was a preacher in it on certain days, the trampled and dirty state of the church will not be wondered at."

In 1805, the communion plate was stolen and never recovered.

The Bishop of Hereford was patron of the Rectory of St Mary Somerset until the mid-nineteenth century, when this was transferred to the Bishop of London.

The second half of the 19th century saw a movement of population from the City of London to suburbs in Middlesex, Kent, Essex and Surrey. This left many of the city churches with tiny congregations, while many of the newly built suburbs had no churches. The Union of Benefices Act 1860 was passed by Parliament, permitting the demolition of City churches and the sale of land to build churches in the suburbs. The last service at St Mary Somerset was held on 1 February 1867, with about 70 people attending. The parish was then combined with that of St Nicholas Cole Abbey, and the church was demolished in 1871.

At the instigation of the architect, Ewan Christian, the church tower was preserved. The proceeds of the sale were used to build St Mary Hoxton, which also received the church furnishings and the bell.

Before the Second World War, the church tower was used as a woman's rest room. The tower now stands on a traffic island surrounded by a small landscaped garden.

== The building ==
The Wren church was an aisleless nave with a flat roof. George Godwin described the interior as "a mere room with low whitewashed walls". Two columns supported a gallery on the west, from which was suspended a Royal coat of arms.

The tower projected from the southwest. It is 120 feet high and faced with Portland stone. Lines of windows, alternately circular and round-headed, run up each side, with grotesque masks and cherubs serving as keystones.

The unique feature of the tower are the eight Baroque pinnacles. The four on each corner have panelled bases and scrolls, surmounted by vases. Between each of these are 20-foot obelisks, with ball finials. The style strongly suggests that they are the design of Nicholas Hawksmoor. They create the optical illusion of changing heights when viewed from different vantage points.

The pinnacles were taken down after the Second World War, due to bomb damage in the London Blitz, but restored by the City Corporation in 1956. The remains of the church were designated a Grade I listed building on 4 January 1950.

The building is currently being refurbished and extended into a private family home by Pilbrow and Partners.

== See also ==
- List of Christopher Wren churches in London
- List of churches rebuilt after the Great Fire but since demolished
- St Michael Queenhithe
