= Gun Lake (British Columbia) =

Lake in British Columbia, Canada

Gun Lake Big Gun Lake
- Location within British Columbia
- Location: British Columbia
- Coordinates: 50°52′00″N 122°53′00″W
- Basin countries: Canada
- Max. length: 6 km (3.7 mi)
- Max. depth: 100 m (330 ft)
- Surface elevation: 2,920 ft (890 m)
- Settlements: Gun Lake

Gun Lake, often spelled Gunn Lake and also known as Big Gun Lake, is a lake and unincorporated community in the Bridge River Country of the West-Central Interior of British Columbia, Canada, located 5 miles northwest of the community of Gold Bridge. It is approximately 6 km in length and is roughly pistol-shaped when seen from above, and drains via a short connecting creek to Gun Creek, which is an important tributary of the Bridge River, joining it via Carpenter Lake. Lajoie Lake, which is just southwest, is also known as Little Gun Lake and is also a small community. The two together are generally referred to as the Gun Lakes.

Gun Lake rests at an elevation of 883 m and sits at the base of Mount Penrose, a 2,627 m (8,618 ft) peak. The lake's the maximum depth is 103 m, with an average depth of Gun Lake is 49.4 m. The lake contains bull trout (Salvelinus confluentus), dolly varden (Salvelinus malma), kokanee (Oncorhynchus nerka), and redside shiner (Richardsonius balteatus), and has been stocked annually with rainbow trout (Oncorhynchus mykiss) since 1995.

"Big Gun" has a summer population around 100 and has a full-time population of approximately 40 people (as of 2016). Gun Lake constitutes one of the main communities of the Bridge River Valley, the others being Gold Bridge and the mining ghost town of Bralorne, and a smaller recreational community in the area of Tyaughton Lake and Gun Creek Road, which runs west from that lake on the north flank of Gun Creek. A major wildfire in 2023 burned along the north shore of Gun Lake, destroying approximately 50 homes.

According to a newspaper article from 1941 written by an early prospector and currently posted in an old mining cabin in Bralorne, Gun Lake and Gun Creek were named because a prospector once lost his Gun in Gun Creek.

== See also ==
- List of lakes of British Columbia
- Gunn (disambiguation)
- Gunn Valley
