= Judge Gunn =

Judge Gunn may refer to:

- Donald Gunn (1797–1878), judge of the Court of Petty Sessions in the Red River Valley of Canada
- George F. Gunn Jr. (1927–1998), judge of the United States District Court for the Eastern District of Missouri
- Mary Ann Gunn (fl. 2010s), judge of the Arkansas Circuit Court and star of Last Shot with Judge Gunn, an American reality-based nontraditional court show

== See also ==
- Justice Gunn (disambiguation)
