= Lajoie Lake =

Lake in British Columbia, Canada

- Little Gun Lake
- Location within British Columbia
- Location: Bridge River Country, British Columbia
- Coordinates: 50°50′00″N 122°54′00″W
- Primary outflows: Lajoie Creek
- Basin countries: Canada

Lajoie Lake, also known as Little Gun Lake, is a small lake in the Bridge River Country of the West-Central Interior of British Columbia, Canada, located three miles west of the community of Gold Bridge and just southwest of Gun Lake, which is also known as Big Gun Lake. The two lakes together are known as the Gun Lakes and both are recreational communities with a history of such settlement dating back to the 1920s. The lake is approximately 3 km^{2} (1 sq mi) in size and is drained by Lajoie Creek, which drains into Big Gun Lake and from that lake's northeastern end into Gun Creek. The creek, lake and nearby Lajoie Dam and the adjoining small company townsite of Lajoie are named for "Lazack" Lajoie, a colourful French-Canadian prospector and promoter who tried to advance the area of the Gun Lakes both as a major potential gold mine and also the site of a future city.

"Little Gun" is the site of the Little Gun Lake Lodge, a custom-built log-cabin mansion built by William G. "Big Bill" Davidson, who also built Minto City, to host investors and VIPs visiting the Bralorne-Pioneer Mines about ten miles south of Gold Bridge. To serve the lodge floatplanes were landed on the lake, and a helicopter pad was also built on the lodge's property, which is the largest private land-holding on the lake and includes the lake itself. It was from Lajoie Lake that mine promoter David Sloan, namesake of the Matterhorn-like Mount Sloan, which overlooks the lake from the other side of the Bridge River to its south, took off on his last flight, dying in a plane crash at Alta Lake (now in the resort of Whistler).

The lodge was for some time operated as a private boutique-hotel but is now a private residence. In addition to the lodge there are a number of other recreational properties around the lake. As a community it has a full-time population in the range of 30.

== See also ==
- List of lakes of British Columbia
