= Thomas Gunn =

English cricketer

Personal information
- Full name: Thomas William Gunn
- Born: 10 July 1843; Croydon, Surrey
- Died: 4 May 1908 (aged 64); Croydon, Surrey
- Batting: Right-handed
- Bowling: Right-arm slow

Domestic team information
- Years: Team
- 1863–1869: Surrey
- Source: Cricinfo, 12 March 2017

Thomas William Gunn (10 July 1843 – 4 May 1908) was an English cricketer. He played six first-class matches for Surrey County Cricket Club, three in each of the 1863 and 1869 seasons.

Born at Croydon in 1843, Gunn was a member of the Surrey ground staff at The Oval. Although Wisden considered that he was a "very useful" club cricketer, he played in only six matches for the county side, scoring 52 runs; the Almanack's judgement was that he "did practically nothing for the County".

Arthur Haygarth was more positive about Gunn's abilities, writing in Scores and Biographies that he "possesses an excellent style, hitting well to all parts, especially forward and to leg". Haygarth noted that he had been influenced by Tom Lockyer, a fellow Croydon man who played for Surrey between 1849 and 1866, and that Gunn bowled "rather slow round-armed".

Gunn died at Croydon in 1908. He was 64.
