= Gunn Lake =

Lake in the state of Minnesota, United States

- Location within Minnesota
- Location: Itasca County, Minnesota
- Coordinates: 47°34.5′N 93°32′W
- Type: lake

Gunn Lake is a lake in Itasca County, in the U.S. state of Minnesota.

Gunn Lake was named for a lumberman.

== See also ==
- List of lakes in Minnesota
