= Antony Norris =

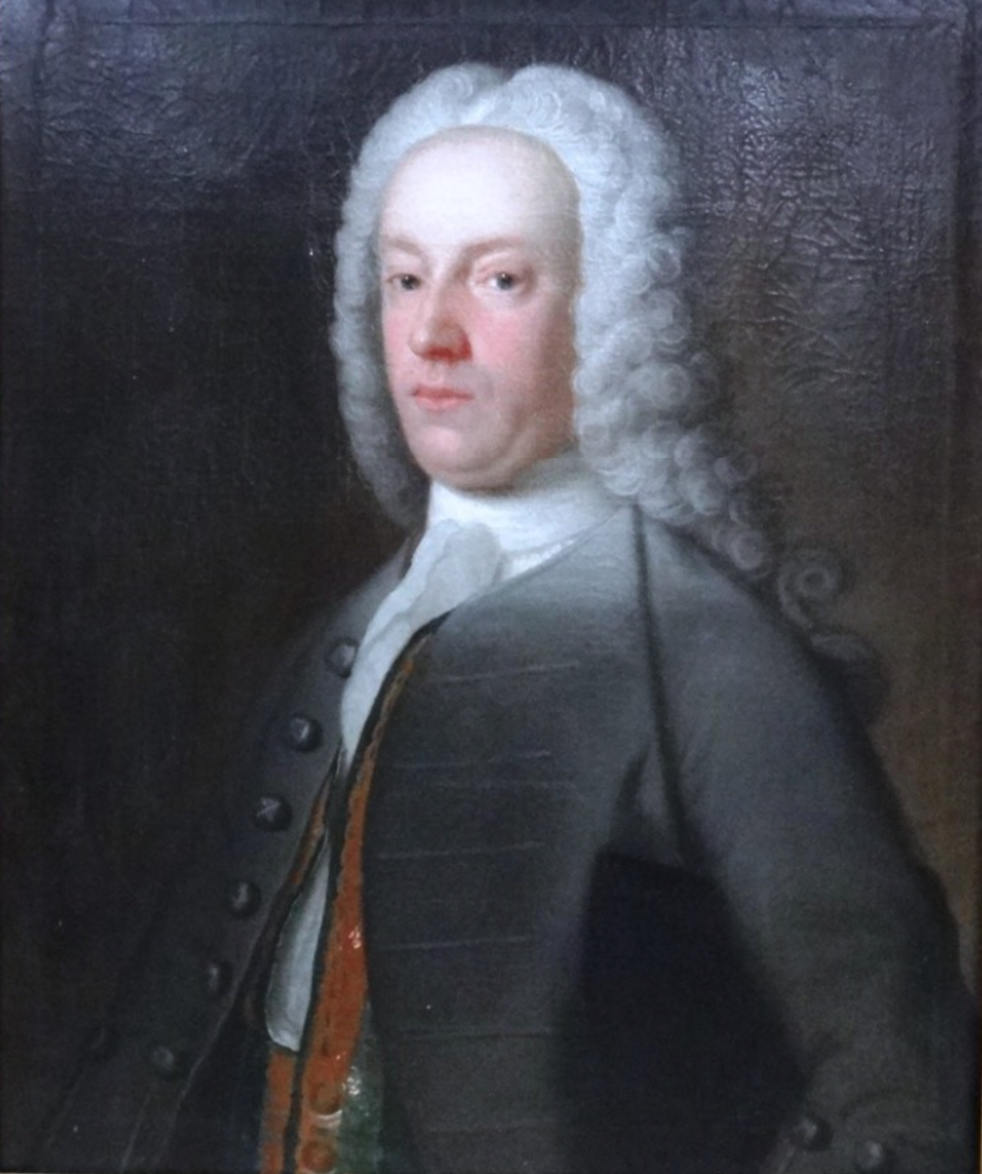

Antony Norris (17 November 1711 – 14 June 1786) was an English lawyer and antiquarian. During many years he compiled a history of east Norfolk.

== Life ==
Norris, of Barton Turf, Norfolk, was descended from a merchant family of Norwich, different members of which had filled most of the municipal offices of that city. He was the third son, but eventual heir, of the Rev. Stephen Norris, and his wife Bridget, daughter of John Graile, rector of Blickling and Waxham, Norfolk. John Norris (1734–1777), founder of the Norrisian professorship, was his cousin. Born on 17 November 1711, and baptised at St George's Church, Tombland, Norwich, Antony was educated at Norwich Grammar School, proceeding in April 1727 to Gonville and Caius College, Cambridge.

In November 1729 he was admitted of the Middle Temple, going into residence in April 1730, and being called to the bar in November 1735, at the age of twenty-four. He was afterwards deputy lieutenant of Norfolk, and between 1761 and 1781 was one of the four chairmen of the General Quarter Sessions.

He married Sarah, daughter of John Custance, J.P. of Norwich, on 18 May 1737, and they had one son, John, born 28 January 1738, and educated at the same school, college, and inn as his father. This son, who was apparently a young man of the greatest promise, a prize-winner and a fellow of his college, died of consumption on 19 March 1762; his laments are expressed in his History of Tunstead (p. 74). Norris, left without child at the comparatively early age of fifty-one, had little to solace him but his love for genealogy and county history.

Possessed of ample means and leisure, "Nature having given him," as he says, "an almost irresistible propensity for inquiries after the ancient state and inhabitants of Norfolk, his native county," he devoted an immense deal of time, trouble, and money to compiling what Walter Rye described as "in some respects, the most perfect piece of county history ever compiled".

There is no doubt he intended to write a complete county history of the whole of the eastern part of Norfolk, a part neglected by Francis Blomefield, and succeeded in completing the Hundreds of East and West Flegg, Happing, and Tunstead, but died before he had done more than seven parishes in North Erpingham. What he completed covers 1,615 very close-written folio pages.

Norris worked in the most systematic and laborious way. Being a friend of the Bishop of Norwich, and a man of some position in the county, he was allowed to take home the original register books of wills from the Norwich registry, and went through them minutely, taking most copious shorthand notes from them in John Byrom's system, the notes covering 1,753 folio pages, and containing references to at least sixty thousand surnames. These he indexed up carefully from time to time, and was thus enabled to give details and correct pedigrees in a way no one else could possibly have done.

He also collected in six volumes 2,818 pages of close notes of monuments and arms in Norfolk, containing very many thousand pen-and-ink sketches of arms and monumental brasses, and five books of extracts from Norfolk deeds, consisting of 472 pages of notes. From these and other sources he compiled two volumes of Norfolk pedigrees (305 in all) most elaborately worked out.

In August 1785, when Norris was suffering from dementia, his wife gave his manuscript collection to the antiquarian John Fenn. Fenn had been a college friend of his son, and had afterwards been on good terms with him. Norris died on 14 June 1786 in Barton Turf, and his widow died a year later; both were buried at Barton Church. In 1788 Fenn compiled a biography of Norris.

The greater part of his collections was later acquired by Walter Rye; they are minutely described and calendared in A Catalogue of Fifty of the Norfolk MSS. in the Library of Mr Walter Rye, privately printed in 1889.
