= Mary Dawson Turner =

English artist (1774–1850)

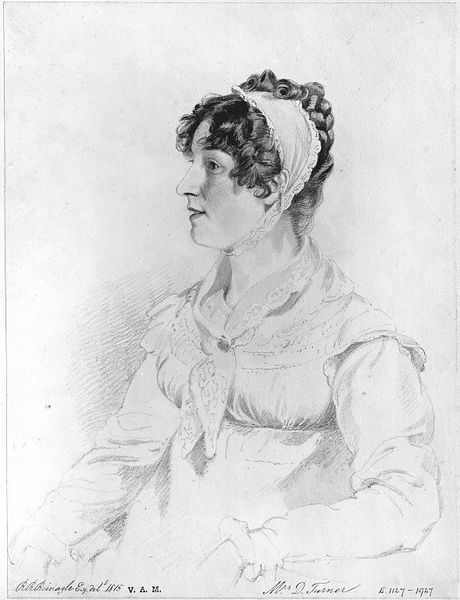
Turner in a 1815 drawing by Ramsay Richard Reinagle

Mary Dawson Turner, formerly Mary Palgrave before her marriage (1774–1850), was an English artist. She is known for her series of portraits, making etchings from drawings collected by her husband.

== Life ==
She was the daughter of William Palgrave, one of 12 children; her sister Anne married Edward Rigby. She married Dawson Turner, and they had 11 children, of whom eight survived to adulthood.

== Works ==
She etched a series of 50 illustrations by John Sell Cotman for her husband's Account of a Tour in Normandy (1820). She also made collections of etched portraits. One set of 50 etchings, published in 1823, was followed by a set of 100 portraits of "distinguished individuals", published at Great Yarmouth. There was a larger collection including also buildings and landscape subjects.
