= Maja Gunn =

Swedish fashion designer

Maja Margita Gunn (born 1978) is a Swedish fashion designer, design researcher and academic who has specialized in lesbian and gender clothing. In December 2017, she was appointed Professor of Crafts at the University of Gothenburg Design School.

== Early life and education ==
Born in Hallsberg, central Sweden, on 31 January 1978, Maja Margita Gunn was brought up in Ludvika. After studying fashion at Stockholm University and at the Utrecht School of the Arts in the Netherlands, she graduated in fashion and costume design at Stockholm's Konstfack in 2005. In 2016, she earned a doctorate from the Swedish School of Textiles in Borås with a dissertation on Body acts queer: Clothing as a performative challenge to heteronormativity.

== Career ==
Gunn has worked as a costume designer for SVT Swedish Television and in fashion at H&M. She worked for a couple of years designing items for the ladies collections at Marc Jacobs in New York. While in the United States, she also designed costumes for television and theatre. More recently, she has created items for the lesbian and gay community, exhibiting her work at Liljevalchs in Stockholm (2015), and at the Textile Museum in Borås (2017). In an interview with Cecilia Ekebjär of the Swedish dt, she summed up her approach as follows: "I am interested in materiality, the relationship between body, clothes and gender."

In December 2017, Maja Gunn was appointed professor of arts and crafts at University of Gothenburg's Steneby Design School, providing special focus on fashion design.

As an artist, Maja Gunn has participated in exhibitions at Liljevalchs, the Nationalmuseum, Dunker Culture House, the Textile Museum of Borås, the Röhsska Museum, the Stockholm Metro, the Livrustkammaren and the Swedish Centre for Architecture and Design.
