= Brian Gunn (cricketer) =

English cricketer

Personal information
- Full name: Brian George Herbert Gunn
- Born: 19 September 1921; Gravesend, Kent, England
- Died: 3 September 2001 (aged 79); Cairns, Queensland, Australia
- Batting: Right-handed
- Bowling: Right-arm leg spin
- Role: Batsman

Domestic team information
- Years: Team
- 1946: Kent
- FC debut: 1 June 1946 Kent v Nottinghamshire
- Last FC: 10 July 1946 Kent v Warwickshire

Career statistics
Competition	First-class
Matches	4
Runs scored	105
Batting average	15.00
100s/50s	0/0
Top score	39
Catches/stumpings	7/–
- Source: Cricinfo, 10 March 2017

Brian George Herbert Gunn (19 September 1921 – 3 September 2001) was an English cricketer. He played four first-class matches for Kent County Cricket Club in 1946.

== Early life ==
Gunn was born at Gravesend in Kent in 1921 and played some cricket for Gravesend Cricket Club during World War II. Towards the end of the war he played for Gravesend and the Army Command sides against an Australian Services team, and in July 1945 he first appeared for a Kent side in a one-day match against Northants, having played for the Club Cricket Conference earlier in the same month.

== Cricket career ==
By the start of the 1946 season Gunn was playing for Dartford Cricket Club. He was selected for Kent's Second XI in two matches at the beginning of the season, opening the batting on each occasion. A duck in his first innings for the side was followed by a century in his second appearance. With the First XI struggling with "inconsistent form, particularly in the batting department" and without a win in five matches, Gunn was called into the side for the team's fifth match of the season, a County Championship fixture against Nottinghamshire at Gillingham at the beginning of June. He made the second highest score of Kent's first innings, making 39 runs, in the side's first victory of the season and, after missing an away fixture against Hampshire was retained in the team for their two home matches at Gravesend later in the month.

Gunn's performances in these matches was unspectacular, although he played a final first-class match away against Warwickshire in July and played three times for the Second XI in the Minor Counties Championship in 1947. In his four first-class matches he scored 105 runs at an average of 15 runs per innings. He took seven catches and did not bowl, although he bowled slow leg breaks regularly for the Second XI.

== Later life ==
In 1950, Gunn emigrated to Australia, working initially as an import and export agent in Sydney. He played Sydney Grade Cricket, initially for Mosman Cricket Club, although he did not appear for the First Grade side until February 1952. He later moved to play for Canterbury. He later had a career in journalism in Queensland, where he established the Ingham and District Post. He died at Cairns in Queensland in 2001 aged 79.
