= Justice Gunn =

Justice Gunn may refer to:

- George F. Gunn Jr. (1927–1998), associate justice of the Supreme Court of Missouri
- Walter T. Gunn (1879–1956), associate justice of the Supreme Court of Illinois

== See also ==
- Judge Gunn (disambiguation)
