= Terry Gunn =

English cricketer (1935–2021)

Personal information
- Full name: Terry Gunn
- Born: 27 September 1935; Barnsley, Yorkshire, England
- Died: 5 April 2021 (aged 85)
- Batting: Right-handed
- Role: Wicket-keeper

Domestic team information
- Years: Team
- 1961–1967: Sussex

Career statistics
| Competition | First-class |
|---|---|
| Matches | 41 |
| Runs scored | 179 |
| Batting average | 5.11 |
| 100s/50s | –/– |
| Top score | 19* |
| Catches/stumpings | 109/5 |
- Source: Cricinfo, 3 January 2012

Terry Gunn (27 September 1935 – 5 April 2021) was an English cricketer. Gunn was a right-handed batsman who fielded as a wicket-keeper. He was born at Barnsley, Yorkshire.

Gunn made his first-class debut for Sussex against Gloucestershire in the 1961 County Championship. Gunn made a number of appearances for Sussex over the next seven seasons, mostly due to the presence of Jim Parks in the Sussex squad, with Gunn generally getting his opportunities in the Sussex first team when Parks was on England Test duty. All told, Gunn made 41 first-class appearances for Sussex, the last of which came against Gloucestershire in 1967. A specialist wicket-keeper with limited batting skills, he scored a total of 179 runs at an average of 5.11, with a high score of 19 not out. Fantastic behind the stumps he took 109 catches and made 5 stumpings. He gained his Sussex cap in 1965 and left Sussex following the 1968 season. Gunn's highest score of 19* not out was in a last wicket partnership with England bowler John Snow who instead of batting defensively in the last over before lunch Snow chipped one up in air and was caught. Although Gunn's batting was limited he once said "I was never given a chance up the order" as he felt he was a bit better than a number 11.

Gunn died on 5 April 2021, at the age of 85.
