= St Mary Mounthaw =

Coordinates: 51°30′37″N 0°5′46″W

St. Mary Mounthaw
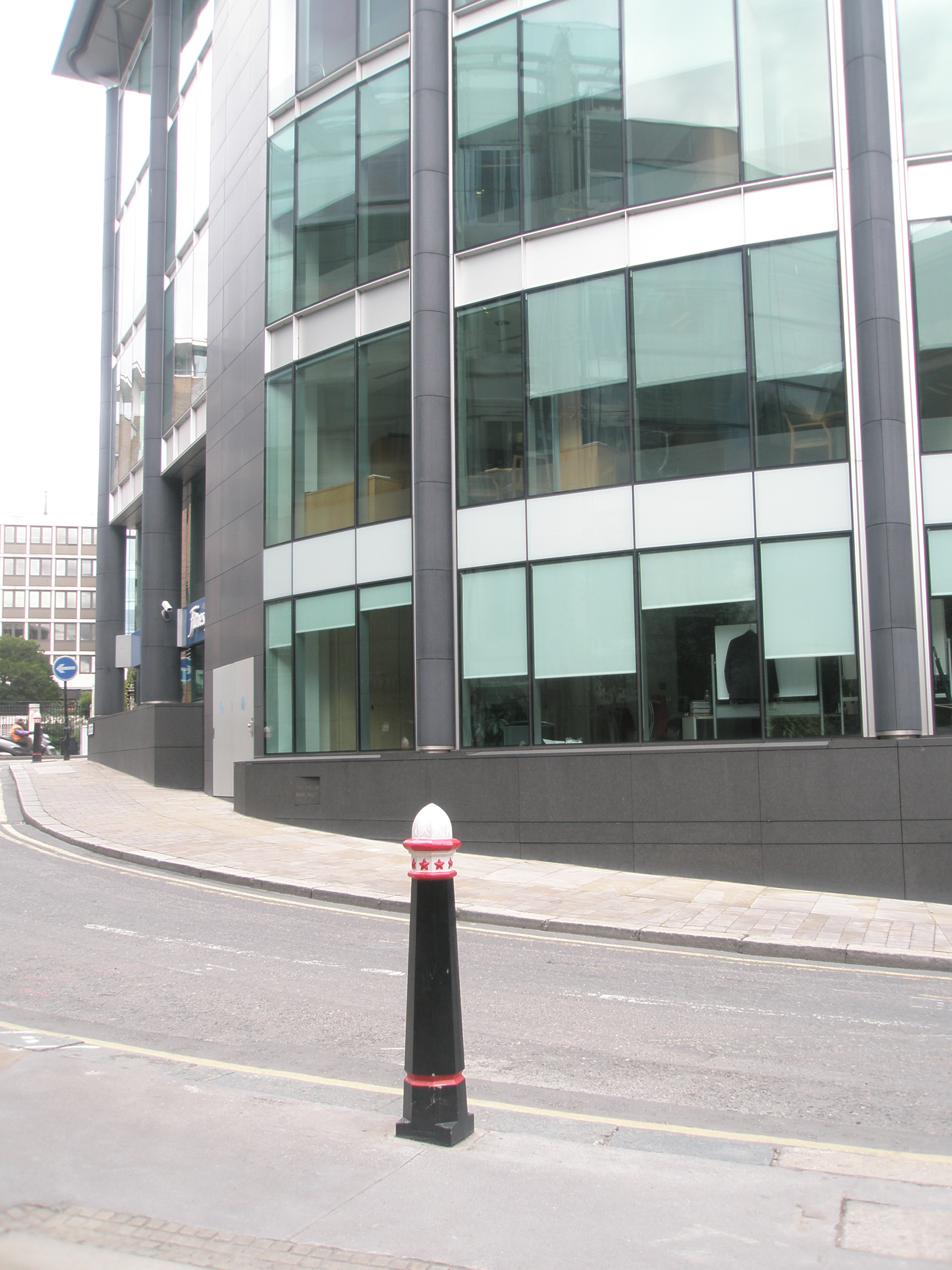
- Current photo of site
- St. Mary Mounthaw
- Location: London
- Country: England
- Denomination: Anglican

Architecture
- Demolished: 1666

St Mary Mounthaw or Mounthaut was a parish church in Old Fish Street Hill in the City of London. It had a close association with the Bishops of Hereford. Of medieval origin, it was destroyed in the Great Fire of London in 1666 and not rebuilt.

== History ==
The church stood on the west side of Old Fish Street Hill in Queenhithe Ward. It was originally built as a chapel for the house of the Mounthaunt family, from Norfolk, from whom the church took its name. In around 1234 the house and the patronage of the church were bought by Ralph de Maydenstone, Bishop of Hereford. He left it to his successors as bishop, who used the house as their London residence, although it was later divided into small tenements. One of the bishops, John Skypp, personal chaplain to, and champion of, Anne Boleyn, was buried in the church.

The church was enlarged and partly rebuilt in 1609, partly at the cost of Robert Bennet, Bishop of Hereford. The next year new glass was installed, at the cost of Thomas Tyler and Richard Tichburne.

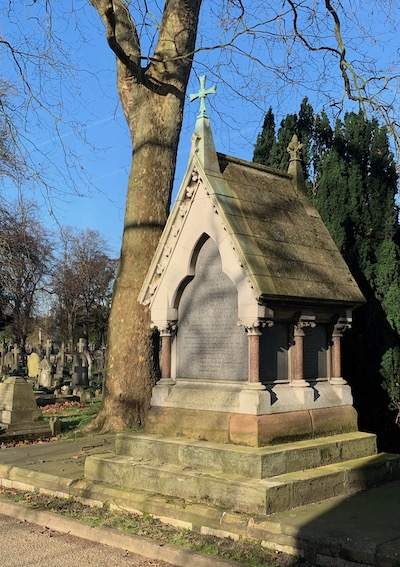
St Mary Mounthaw monument in the City of London Cemetery

== Destruction ==
Along with the majority of the 97 parish churches in the City of London, St Mary Mounthaw was destroyed by the Great Fire in September 1666. In 1670 a Rebuilding Act was passed and a committee set up under Sir Christopher Wren to decide which would be rebuilt. St Mary Mounthaw was not one of those chosen; instead the parish was united with that of St Mary Somerset, and the site retained as a graveyard.
