= Shirley Gunn =

South African activist (born 1955)

- Born: Kenilworth, Cape Town, South Africa
- Education: University of Cape Town
- Organization(s): African National Congress, uMkhonto weSizwe

Shirley Gunn (born 9 May 1955) is a South African former anti-apartheid activist and Umkhonto we Sizwe (MK) member who was falsely accused of the Khotso House bombings in 1998.

== Early life and political activism ==
Gunn was born the youngest of five children in the Cape Town suburb of Kenilworth. Her father was a doctor and her mother a nurse. She attended a convent school from age 5 to 18. In 1966 and 1967, Gunn accompanied her mother to various poor communities in Cape Town. From age 17, Gunn assisted her brother who was a doctor at a clinic in Hermanus. Disillusioned by apartheid, she left nursing in 1976 and enrolled at the University of Cape Town (UCT) for a degree in social work.

For her honours degree, Gunn was placed in Hout Bay to do community work. Here she joined the African National Congress (ANC) in 1980. She was recruited in the ANC's political underground activities where she helped develop militant strategies. Gunn was then assigned to coordinate the work of the Advice Offices in the Western Cape. While Gunn was still working with the Advice Offices, the first clothing workers’ union strike took place. Gunn mobilised the Advice Offices to support the strike, while simultaneously receiving military training.

== Arrests ==
In 1984, Gunn was recruited into the MK by Leon Meyer. As a result of her anti-apartheid activity, she was arrested by the security police in 1985 and detained at Pollsmoor Prison for more than three months. Gunn's release was secured when Dullah Omar represented her in her trial, but she was placed under surveillance and was continuously harassed by security police. She was subsequently exiled to Botswana.

In 1988, Gunn returned to South Africa. She and her then-husband, Aneez Salie, assisted in the establishment of the Ashley Kriel unit and carried out an unspecified number of sabotage attacks of symbolic institutions in the Western Cape. In August that same year, Khotso house, the headquarters of the South African Council of Churches, was bombed and 21 people were injured. In a ploy to arrest her, a pregnant Gunn was accused of the bombings in a statement issued by then Minister of Law and Order Adriaan Vlok on 10 January 1989. After the birth of her son, Haroon Gunn-Salie, Gunn was arrested in June 1990 and detained with her son. Gunn was held in cells that had appalling conditions, resulting in her lodging a complaint with the police. As punishment for the complaint, the police in court took her son away. Recordings of her son's weeping were used during Gunn's interrogation as a means of forcing her to confess. She was later taken to the Caledon Women's Prison where she was detained for 68 days.

In June 1990, Gunn and her 16-month-old son travelled with her mother and sister to a guest farm outside Victoria West in the Karoo. Here she was arrested by large numbers of security policemen. She and her son were driven to Cape Town where they were again detained. Gunn was tortured for 64 days.

Two years later, when it was discovered that the security forces were responsible for the bombing, Gunn laid defamation charges in a civil case against Ministers Vlok, Rina Venter and Kobie Coetsee. She won an out-of-court settlement of R70 000 for the trauma she and her son endured and for having been framed. Gunn later testified of her own experiences to the Truth and Reconciliation Commission (TRC), while Vlok, former Police Commissioner Johan van der Merwe and 17 others were granted amnesty for the bombing.

== Present day ==
Gunn continues to work in advancing human rights. She is currently the Executive Director of Human Rights Media Centre (HRMC) in Kenilworth, Cape Town and a board member on the Khulumani Support Group.
