= William Alphonsus Gunn =

English evangelical cleric (1760–1806)

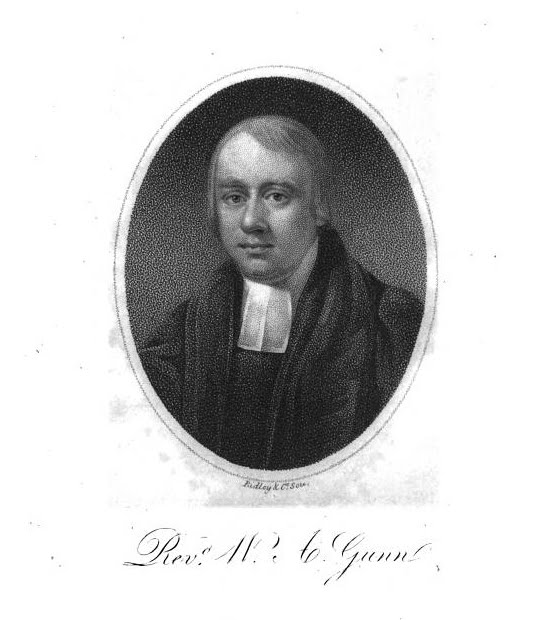
William Alphonsus Gunn

William Alphonsus Gunn (1760–1806) was an English evangelical cleric.

== Life ==
Gunn was born on 29 September 1760, in Rotherhithe, the son of William Gunn, a naval officer, who died when he was an infant; his mother died in 1771.

A cousin, Margaret Morris, supported Gunn's studies at Guildford Grammar School, and he matriculated at Magdalen College, Oxford in 1778. He left without taking a degree. He came under the influence of Richard Conyers in Deptford, where he stayed with his cousin. Taking a post as usher in a school in Wandsworth, he was persuaded to think of the Anglican ministry.

Gunn was ordained in 1783, by Brownlow North, and became a curate at the parish of Chobham and Bisley. From 1788 he was curate at Odiham. In 1786 he was appointed preacher at Farnham. He lost this post in 1792, the vicar objecting to his approach, and there was a secession from the Farnham church.

Moving to London, Gunn was lecturer at St Mary Somerset with St Mary Mounthaw, from 1793. He came into the orbit of John Newton, a significant influence, at St Mary Woolnoth. Newton tried in 1795 to bring him to St Helen's Bishopsgate, but failed, because of local resistance. In 1796 Gunn became Newton's curate at St Mary Woolnoth. Newton found Gunn both popular with his congregation and humble; but noted that Gunn was even more unpopular with the wider clergy than evangelicals generally were. Joseph Irons, father of William Josiah Irons, who became an itinerant preacher, was converted by Gunn's preaching, around 1803. Another impressed by Gunn was Jacob Kirkman Foster, who became a Cheshunt College tutor. An opponent took the chance to criticise Gunn for his use of snuff.

Gunn died of consumption on 5 December 1805.

== Works ==
- Sermons on Various Subjects, and Letters to an Undergraduate at the University; by the late Rev. William Alphonsus Gunn. To which are prefixed Memoirs of his Life (1811), edited by Isaac Saunders. A hostile review commented that "the letters differ little, if at all, from the sermons, excepting in their length".
