= Peter J. Murray =

English writer

Peter J. Murray born 1951 is a writer of children's books.

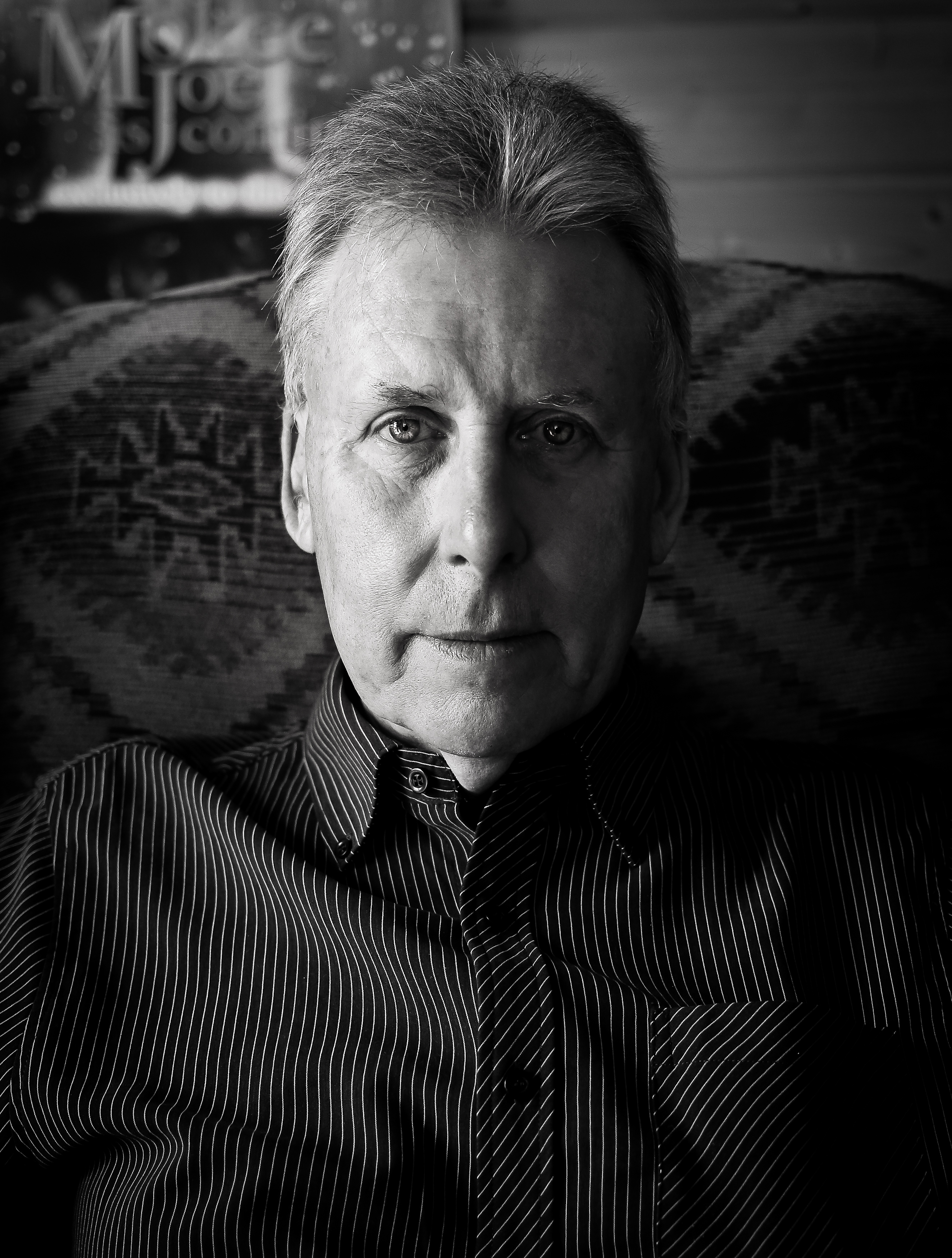

Best known for the popular Mokee Joe series, Peter has won the Stockton Children's Book Award, the Sheffield Children's Book Award and the Bedfordshire Children's Book of the Year Award for his writing.

Peter writes spooky stories for children aged 7–13.

The covers to Peter Murray's books are illustrated by Paul Bryn Davies, who has created covers for works by Stephen King and others.

Before Peter became a full-time children's author he taught mathematics at schools in the UK, most recently as Deputy Headteacher at Cheam School (the Hampshire school famous for having educated both Prince Philip and Prince Charles).

== Family ==
Peter lives with his wife Kath Murray. They divide their time between their home in the Hampshire countryside, close to Cheam School, and Rotherham where Peter was brought up.

Peter and Kath have two sons, Matthew and Simon Murray. Simon is the illustrator of the inner pages for many of Peter Murray's books, as well as author of the Icky Doo Dah series of illustrated children such as the acclaimed CBBC star Roy O'Brien.

== Early life ==
Born in Rotherham, Peter started life on a council estate. He failed his 11+ and was not allowed to sit his mathematics exams. After leaving school, Peter went to work in a Sheffield steelworks but was not happy. He spent ten years studying outside of work to get a degree in Metallurgy from Cambridge University. With a degree under his belt he embarked on a further year's study at Cambridge University, gaining an MPhil degree in Materials Technology.

Peter tried his hand at teaching and took up a position at Aston Comprehensive School, staying for four and half years.

Peter then travelled to Dubai, teaching mathematics and science to Arabic students in the aluminium industry before returning to England to take up a teaching post at Grosvenor House School in Harrogate, Yorkshire.

In 1990, Peter accepted a post as a Mathematics teacher and House Master at Cheam School, a prestigious private school in England. In 1999, Peter was appointed Deputy Headteacher at the school.

== Inspiration ==
Peter first got his name in print when he sent a poem to his local newspaper, the Newbury Weekly News. It wasn't until 2001 that Peter started writing novels. This was inspired by a conversation with his niece in which she recalled when she would play hide and seek with Peter's sons. Peter would disguise himself in a spooky hat and long overcoat before hunting out the children. She recounted with delight how Peter would call out 'Mokee Joe is coming to get you'. It was this conversation that made Peter decide he had to write about this scary character he'd created, and the Mokee Joe series was born.

== Early success ==
Murray initially self-published his first title, Mokee Joe is Coming! and, after proving its popularity in bookshops, the rights to the title were snapped up by Hodder Children's Books. Peter Murray signed a three-book deal with Hodder and subsequently released Mokee Joe Recharged and Mokee Joe - The Doomsday Trail.

Peter later decided to buy back the rights and return to self-publishing his titles, setting up a publishing company, Atlantis Children's Books, in 2011 with son and illustrator Simon Murray.

== Books ==
- Mokee Joe is Coming! (2004) ISBN 978-0955341519

Mokee Joe is Coming!, winner of the Sheffield Children's Book Award, was self-published in 2003 and subsequently published by Hodder Children's Books. It has also been translated into Spanish and Japanese. Peter's first Mokee Joe book was reviewed by the Observer, and described as 'Spooky, heart-thumping stuff'.

- Mokee Joe Recharged (2004) ISBN 978-0955341526

The second book in the Mokee Joe series. This book saw the continued journey of Hudson in his fight against the evil Mokee Joe. This was also translated into Japanese along with the third book in the Mokee Joe trilogy listed below.

- Mokee Joe The Doomsday Trail (2005) ISBN 978-0955341533
- Mokee Joe Mutant Resurrection (2013) ISBN 978-0957108806

Mutant Resurrection was launched in front of 1500 fans at the famous Apollo Theater in Harlem, New York.

- Mokee Joe Swamp Warrior (2013) ISBN 978-0957108837
- Mokee Joe Scourge of the Emirates (2017) ISBN 978-0957108875

Scourge of the Emirates is the penultimate book in the Mokee Joe series.

Other books by Peter J Murray:

- Bonebreaker (2006) ISBN 978-0955341540

Voted Bedfordshire Children's book of the Year 2006, Bonebreaker was the first in Peter's second trilogy and was inspired by the Viking invasion of the East Coast.

- Dawn Demons (2007) ISBN 978-0955341557
- Moonwailer (2008) ISBN 978-0955341564
- Scabbajack (2010) ISBN 978-0955341595

Often used to teach the Victorian era within the National Curriculum, Peter Murray's seventh book, Scabbajack rose to popularity, shortlisted for the Northern Children's Book Award and winning the Stockton Children's Book Award 2010.

- Ten O'Clock Caller (2012) ISBN 0957108818
- Kruschmeister (2016) ISBN 0957108869
- The darker side of wight (2023) ISBN 978-1-911487-87-6

== Renaissance Learning ==
Peter works alongside the Renaissance Learning project, collaborating with schools and librarians and speaking at their symposiums and conferences. His titles are quizzed and used within their Accelerated Reader Scheme.

== The Carmel Hill Fund ==
Murray's books have been recognised for their ability to engage reluctant readers through their adoption by the Carmel Hill Fund Education Project. The project seeks to support educators in fostering a love of learning within students. As such, Peter Murray's books are widely available and used within schools in New York and Louisiana.

The Carmel Hill Foundation arranged for the launch of Mokee Joe: Mutant Resurrection (2012) at Harlem's famous Apollo Theater in New York

== School visits ==
Murray and his wife Kath visit schools around the world to present Murray's books and to inspire students to read and to learn to love books. During these visits children are provided with forms to complete to purchase said books, and are encouraged to pester their parents to make a purchase. Together, they have visited schools from the Cayman Islands to the Channel Islands, and most places in between.
