= Gunn (given name) =

Gunn is a female Norwegian given name. Notable people with the name include:

- Gunn Berit Gjerde (born 1954), Norwegian politician
- Gunn Imsen (born 1946), Norwegian professor
- Gunn Karin Gjul (born 1967), Norwegian politician
- Gunn Marit Helgesen (born 1958), Norwegian politician
- Gunn Olsen (1952–2013), Norwegian politician
