= William Gunn (physician) =

African-American physician (1855–1922)

William Gunn (1855–1922) was one of Florida's first African-American medical doctors. He began his career working as a driver for a medical doctor at the Knott House. Gunn was born in Leon County, Florida in 1855. He was mentored by Dr. Betton, a Euro-American medical doctor who financed Gunn's education at Meharry Medical College after Gunn came to work for him as a driver.
