= Bill Gunn (footballer, born 1899) =

Australian rules footballer

Personal information
- Full name: William John Gunn
- Born: 12 May 1899; Albert Park, Victoria
- Died: 28 January 1970 (aged 70); Kew, Victoria
- Original team: Maryborough
- Height: 174 cm (5 ft 9 in)
- Weight: 72 kg (159 lb)

Playing career^{1}
Years	Club	Games (Goals)
1922	South Melbourne	10 (1)
- ^{1} Playing statistics correct to the end of 1922.

William John Gunn (12 May 1899 – 28 January 1970) was an Australian rules footballer who played with South Melbourne in the Victorian Football League (VFL).
