= Will A. Gunn =

American military member

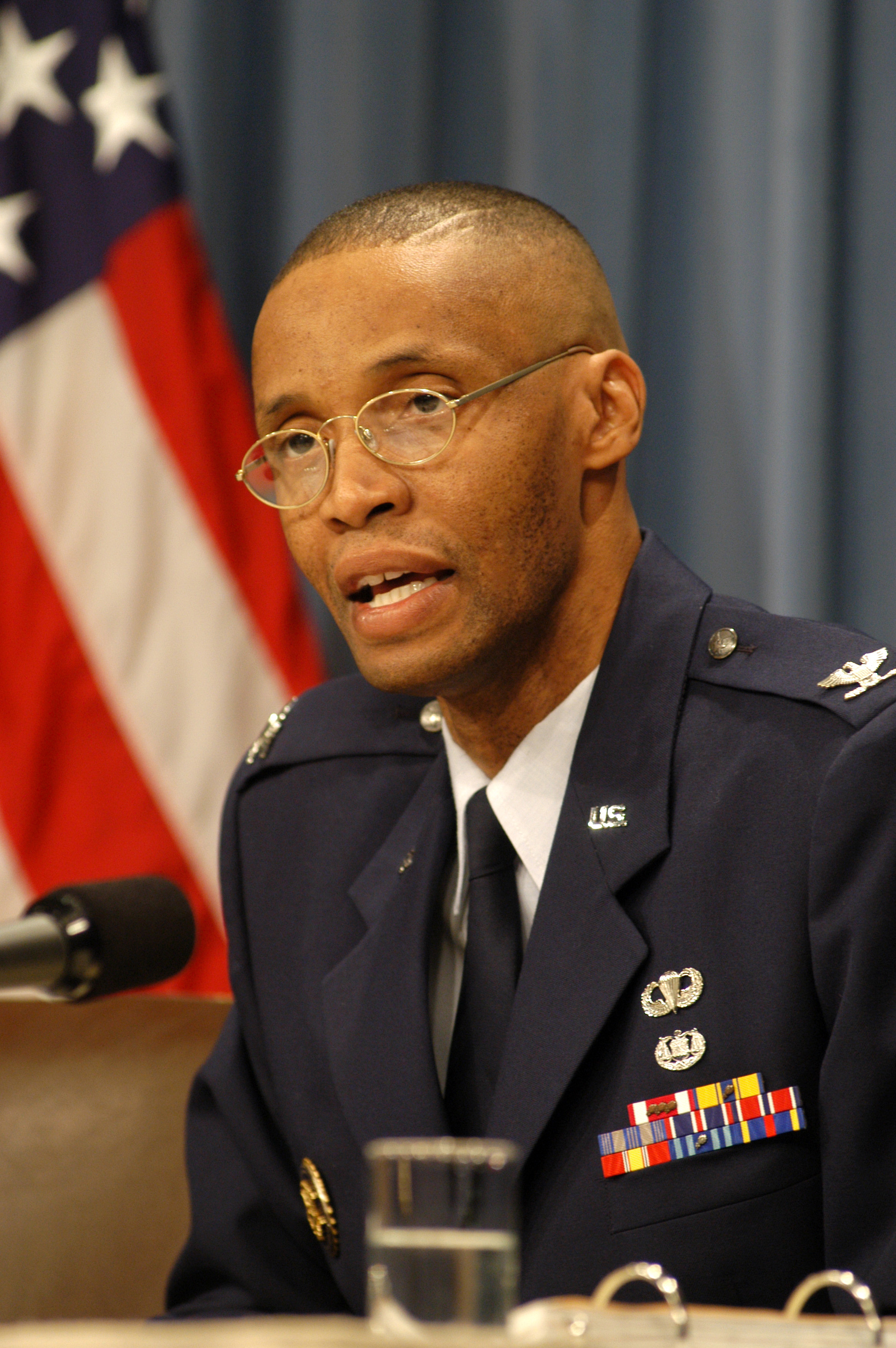
Will A. Gunn in 2003.

Will A. Gunn is an American attorney and former officer in the United States Armed Forces. Gunn was appointed by President Barack Obama to be the new general counsel for the United States Department of Veterans Affairs.

== Early life and education ==
He attended the United States Air Force Academy, graduating in 1980, and Harvard Law School, graduating in 1986. While at Harvard, he was elected president of the Harvard Legal Aid Bureau. In 1990 Gunn was a White House Fellow and associate director of Cabinet Affairs. Gunn also has a Master of Laws degree in environmental law from George Washington University Law School and a Master of Science degree in national resource strategy from the Industrial College of the Armed Forces.

== Military career ==
In 2003, Gunn was asked to lead the military lawyers defending detainees before the Guantanamo military commissions. After getting advice from friends, many of whom advised against taking the job, and his pastor, he accepted the position and was appointed. His team wrote an amicus curae brief for the U.S. supreme court in the 2003–2004 case (Rasul v. Bush) that ultimately established the right of detainees to bring cases in U.S. courts. This brief opposed the administration's position and supported the detainees. Gunn, the Pentagon general counsel and the White House counsel Alberto Gonzales all authorized for submission to the court. He retired from the military in 2005 after more than 20 years of service. Subsequently, he entered private law practice, led a charitable organization and served as a church minister.

On October 21, 2004, Gunn was invited to address Duke Law School. After his address Gunn was asked whether the Military Commissions could be conducted in a manner that was fair and just. He replied: "I'd prefer that you all come to your own conclusions as to whether we can have full and fair proceedings."
