= Peter L. Murray =

American legal scholar

Peter Murray

Academic background
- Education: Harvard University (AB, LLB)

Academic work
- Discipline: Law
- Sub-discipline: Comparative law Trial advocacy Admiralty law
- Institutions: Harvard Law School

Peter L. Murray is an American legal scholar working as the Robert Braucher Visiting Professor and Edward R. Johnston Lecturer on Law at Harvard Law School.

== Education ==
Murray earned a Bachelor of Arts degree from Harvard College in 1963 and a Bachelor of Laws from Harvard Law School.

== Career ==
From 1967 to 1968, Murray served as law clerk for Judge Edward Thaxter Gignoux. He worked as secretary to the Maine Judicial Council from 1969 to 1978 and has been a consultant to the Maine Advisory Committee on Rules of Evidence since 1973. Murray also co-founded Murray, Plumb & Murray in Portland, Maine.

Murray is an authority in the fields of evidence, comparative law, trial advocacy, comparative civil procedure, and admiralty law. He is a member of the American Law Institute and the American Board of Trial Advocacy.

Murray is a member of the editorial board of Russian Law Journal.
