= Barton Turf =

Village and civil parish in Norfolk, England

Coordinates: 52.748°N 1.485°E

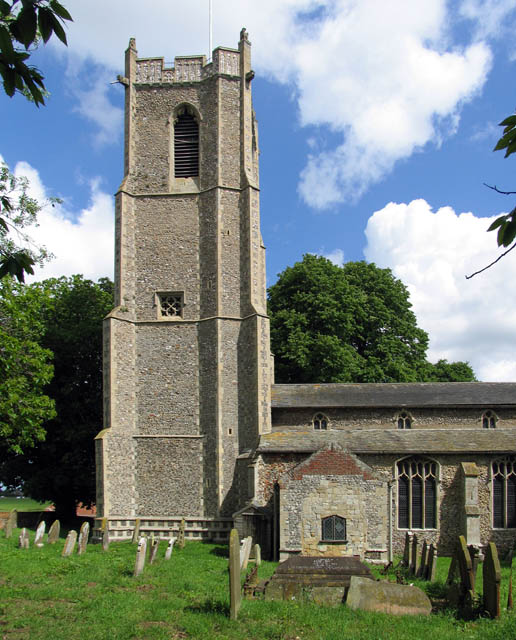
- St Michael and All Angels' parish church

- Location within Norfolk
- Area: 10.86 km^{2} (4.19 sq mi)
- Population: 467 (2011)
  - Density: 44/km^{2}
- OS grid reference: TG353224
  - London: 132 miles (212 km)
- Civil parish: Barton Turf
- District: North Norfolk
- Shire county: Norfolk
- Region: East
- Country: England
- Sovereign state: United Kingdom
- Post town: NORWICH
- Postcode district: NR12
- Dialling code: 01263
- Police: Norfolk
- Fire: Norfolk
- Ambulance: East of England
- UK Parliament: North Norfolk

Barton Turf is a village and civil parish in the English county of Norfolk. It is 12 miles (19 km) north-east of the city of Norwich, on the north-western edge of Barton Broad, the second largest of the Norfolk Broads. The parish is in the district of North Norfolk.

The civil parish, which includes the whole of Barton Broad and the smaller village of Irstead at its southern end, has an area of 10.86 square kilometres (4.19 sq mi). In the 2001 census it had a population of 480 in 181 households, the population decreasing to 467 at the 2011 Census.

The church of St Michael and All Angels Church, Barton Turf, about 1 mile (1.6 km) from the clustered village centre, has a large, ornate medieval painted rood screen such as many medieval parishes who could afford fine artisans once had, but which have rarely survived the English Reformation.

The 18th-century antiquarian Antony Norris lived in Barton Turf, and is buried at the church.

== Barton Hall ==
Barton Hall, Barton Turf is a house owned by Sir Sidney Peel's noble wife and is a Grade II (starting category) listed building with a typical, of a former manorial farmhouse, fishpond and array of outhouses around a courtyard to the front.

It was built 1742 with two fronts later remodelled. Its walls are brick, partly plastered to appear ashlar (regular, grand stone courses). Its roofs are of plain tiles and pantiles. A grand list of 18th-century revival classical architecture follows in its listing such as detailing its tympanum, entablature, pediment, quoins, rustication, string course by cornice and rounded window within intercolumniation.

== Gallery ==
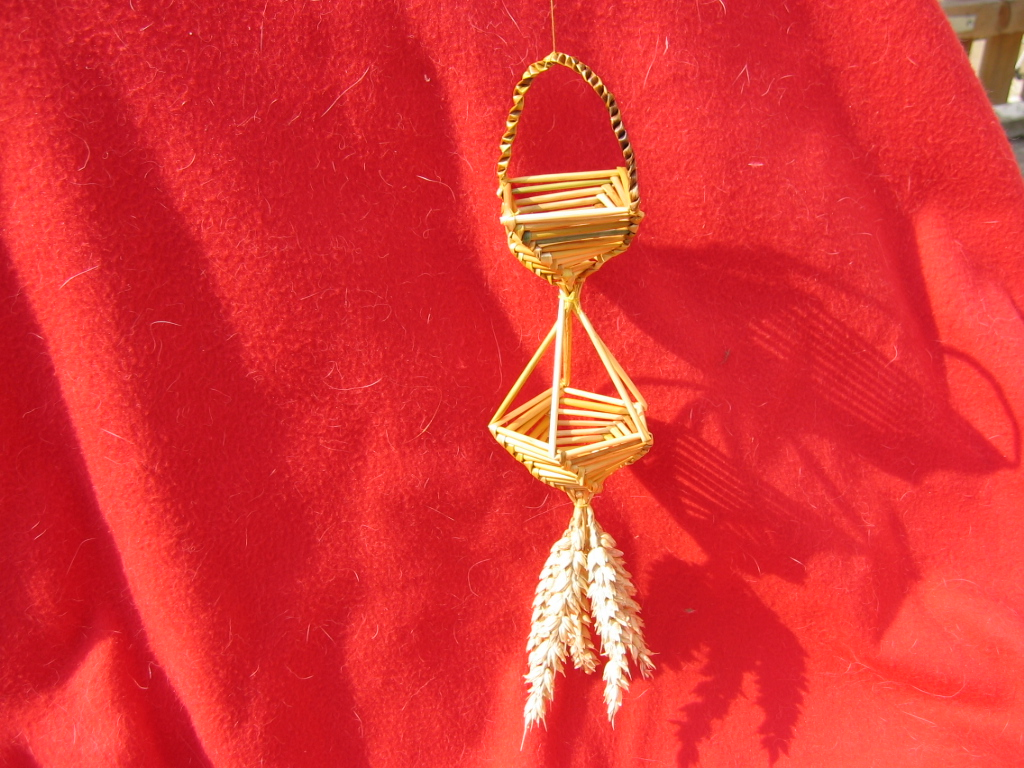
Barton Turf has given its name to a traditional Corn dolly which consists of two vertical baskets.

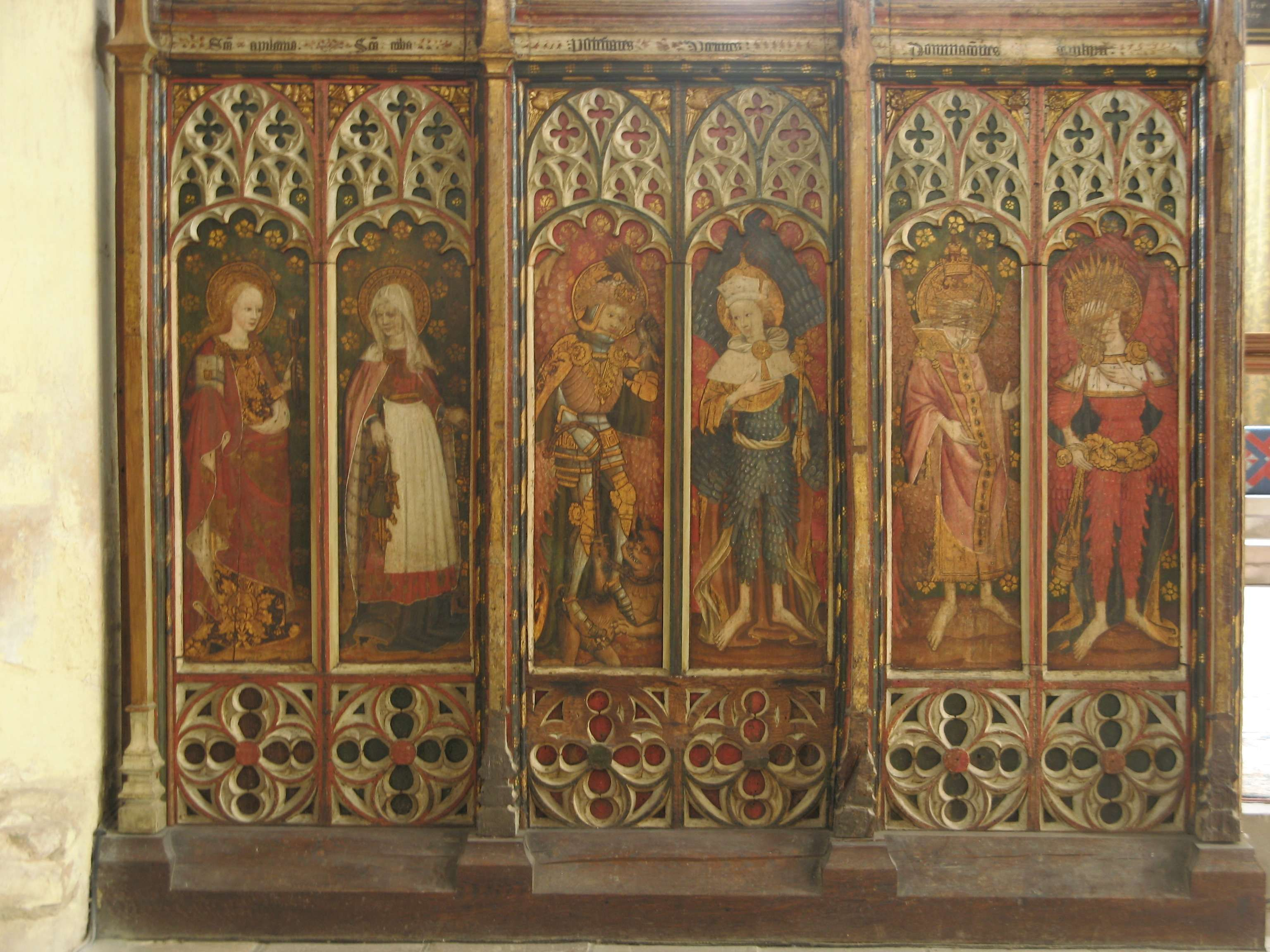
Some paintings from the 15th-century Rood Screen in St Michael and All Angels church, Barton Turf

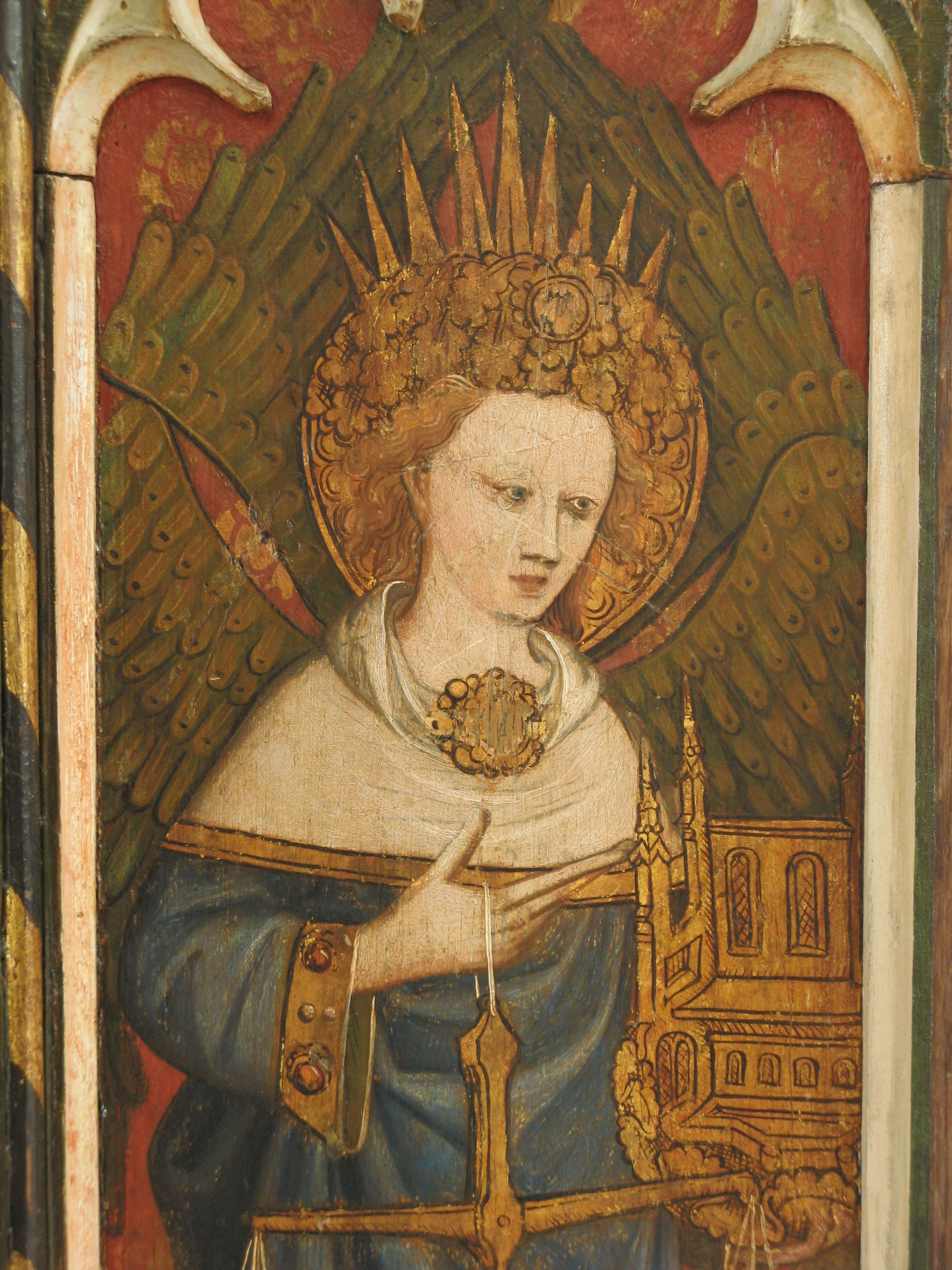
Thrones (angels) from the 15th-century Rood Screen in St Michael and All Angels church, Barton Turf

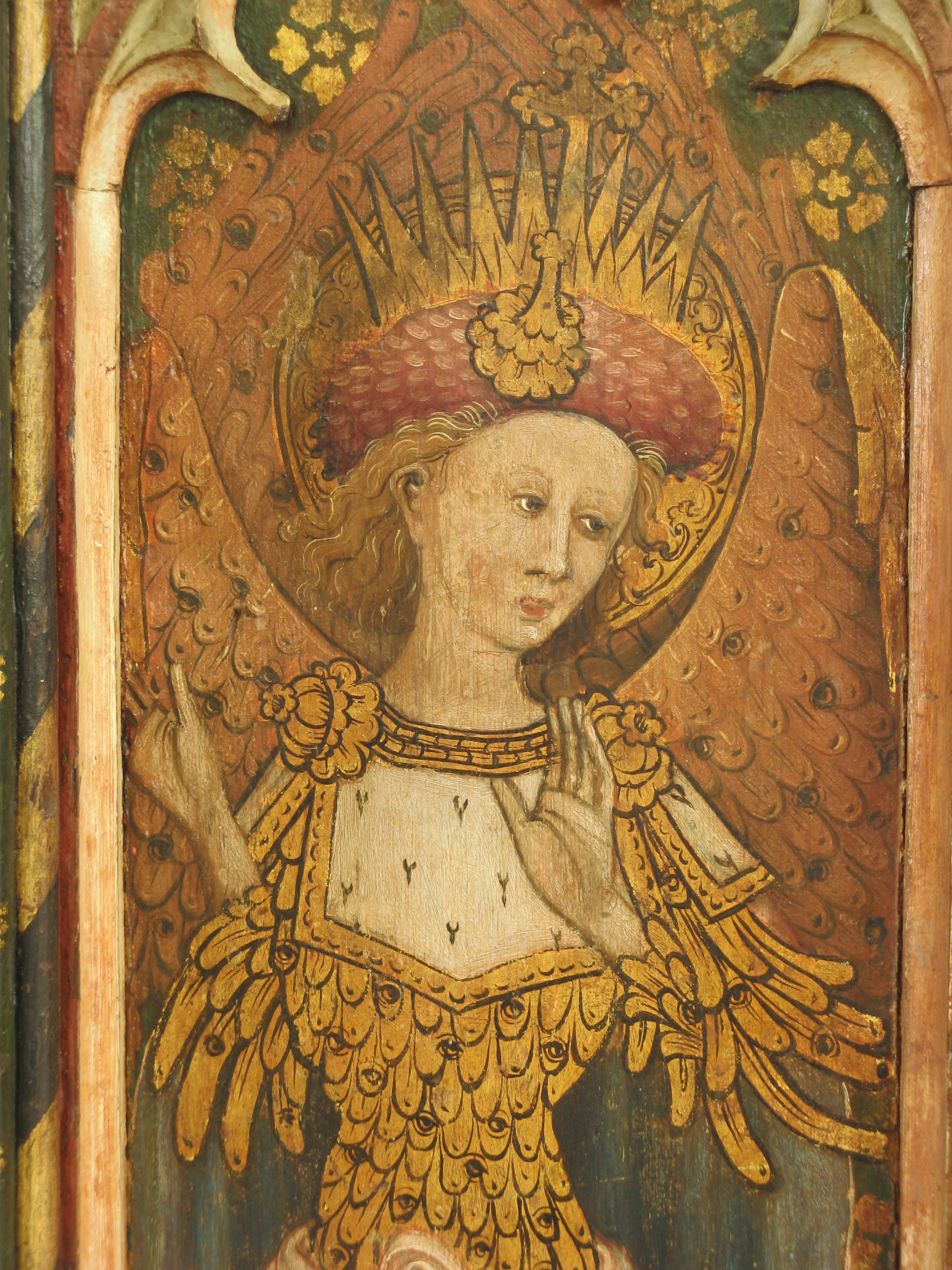
Cherubim from the 15th-century Rood Screen in St Michael and All Angels church, Barton Turf

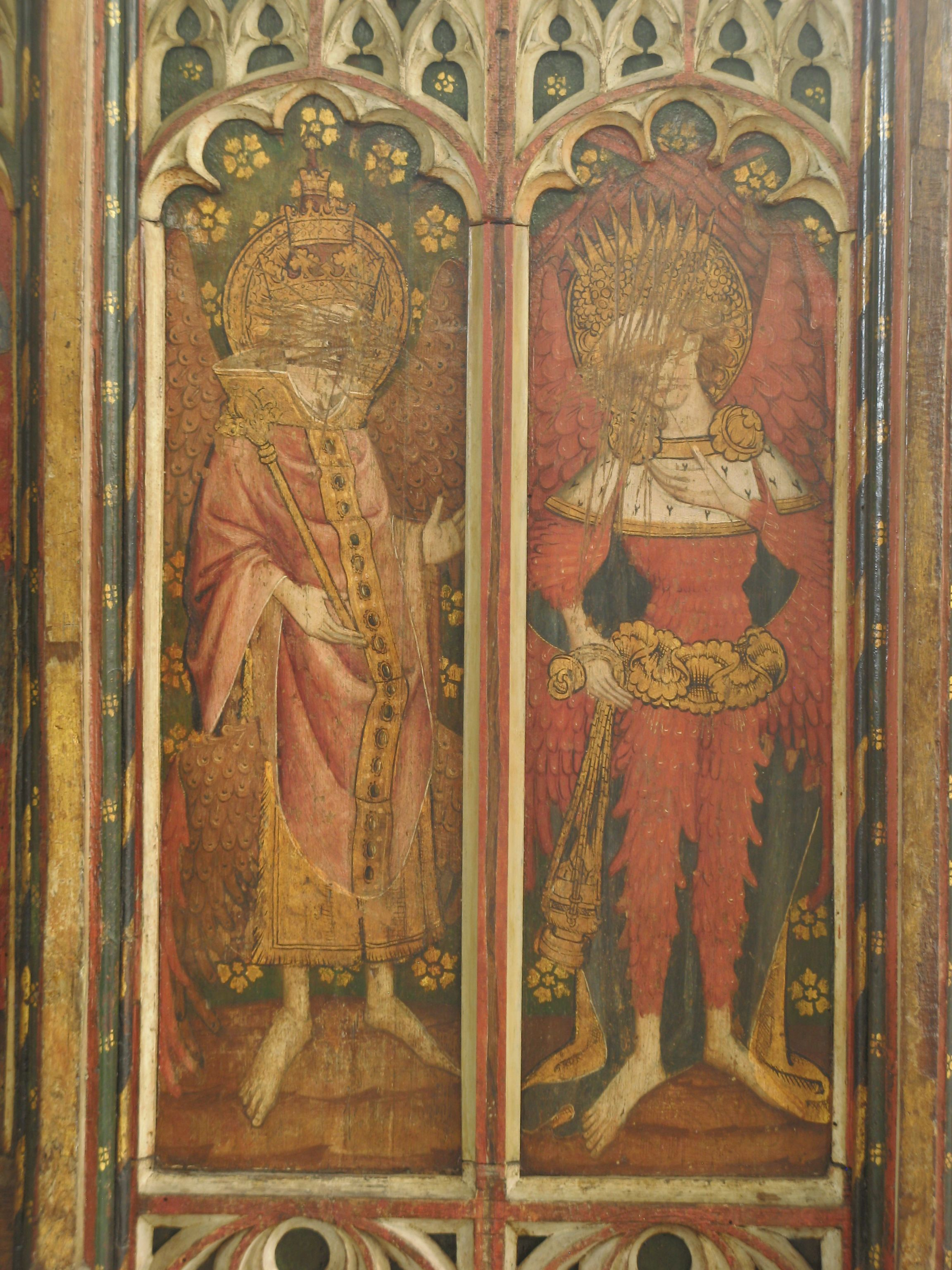
Iconoclastic damage from the Reformation, St Michael and All Angels church, Barton Turf

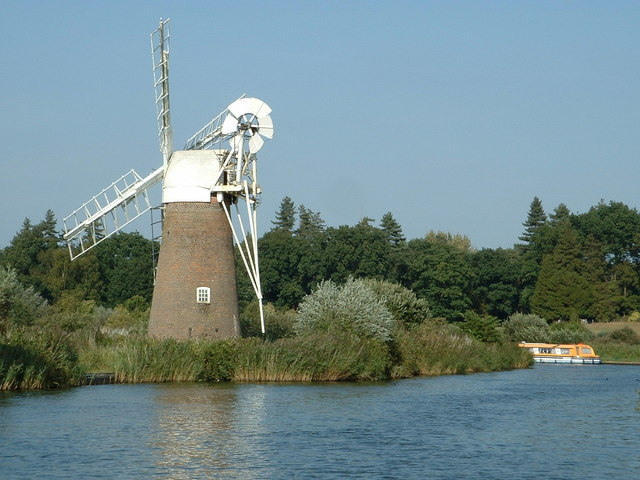
Turf Fen Windpump, Barton Turf, Grade II* listed.
