= Chan Gunn =

Canadian academic

Chit Chan Gunn, OC OBC is the founder and president of The Institute for the Study and Treatment of Pain (iSTOP) in Vancouver, British Columbia, Canada.

The University of British Columbia Chan Gunn Pavilion was built using funds donated by Gunn.
