= Bill Gunn (footballer, born 1932) =

Australian rules footballer

Personal information
- Born: 4 March 1932
- Died: 23 March 1991 (aged 59)
- Original team: Williamstown (VFA)
- Height: 183 cm (6 ft 0 in)
- Weight: 82 kg (181 lb)

Playing career^{1}
Years	Club	Games (Goals)
1952–1959	South Melbourne	104 (101)
- ^{1} Playing statistics correct to the end of 1959.

William Gunn (4 March 1932 – 23 March 1991) was an Australian rules footballer who played with South Melbourne in the Victorian Football League (VFL) during the 1950s.

A half-forward flanker, Gunn finished equal fifth in the 1958 Brownlow Medal and was a regular Victorian interstate representative. He captained South Melbourne for the 1955 VFL season, topping their goal-kicking the following season with 28 goals.

Gunn is the grandfather of former Western Bulldogs player and Greater Western Sydney captain Callan Ward.
