= Steve Gunn (ice hockey) =

Canadian ice hockey player

- Born: November 11, 1890 Brandon, Manitoba, Canada
- Died: March 8, 1914 (aged 23) Ninette, Manitoba, Canada
- Position: Left wing
- Played for: Toronto Blueshirts
- Playing career: 1908–1913

Stephen Clement Gunnlaugson, known as Steve Gunn, (November 11, 1890 – March 8, 1914) was a Canadian professional ice hockey player. He played with the Toronto Blueshirts of the National Hockey Association. He appeared in 3 games for the Blueshirts in the 1912–13 season, scoring one goal.
