= Irstead =

Village in Norfolk, England

Coordinates: 52.729°N 1.501°E

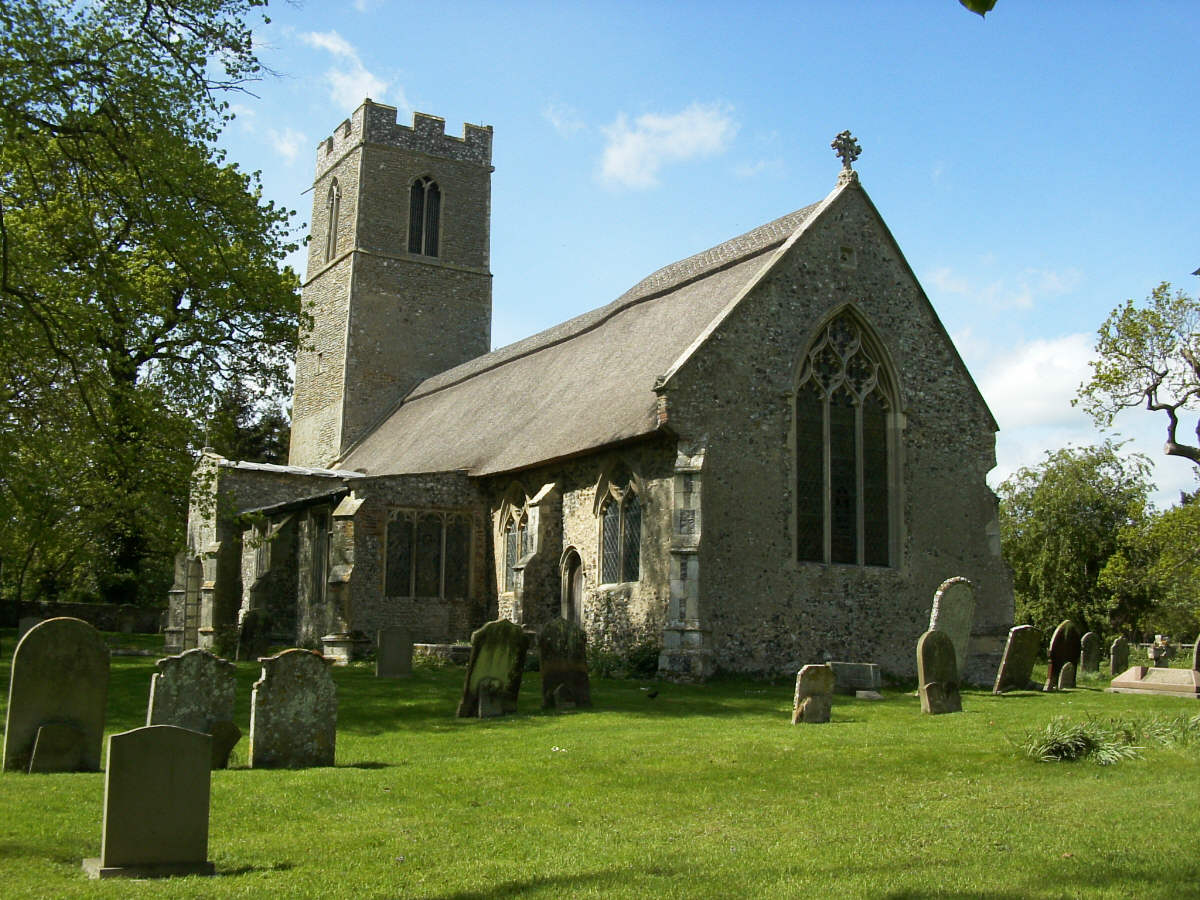
- St. Michael's Church

- Location within Norfolk
- OS grid reference: TG365204
- Civil parish: Barton Turf
- District: North Norfolk
- Shire county: Norfolk
- Region: East
- Country: England
- Sovereign state: United Kingdom
- Post town: Norwich
- Postcode district: NR12
- Dialling code: 01692
- UK Parliament: North Norfolk

Irstead is a village and former civil parish, now in the parish of Barton Turf, in the North Norfolk district, in the English county of Norfolk. It is 6.3 miles (10.1 km) north of Acle and 11 miles (18 km) north-east of Norwich, along the River Ant.

Irstead's name is of Anglo-Saxon origin, although it is not listed in the Domesday Book.

On 1 April 1935 the parish was abolished and merged with Barton Turf. In 1931 the parish had a population of 113. Irstead is part of the electoral ward of Hoveton & Tunstead for local elections.

== St. Michael's church ==
Irstead's church is dedicated to Saint Michael and dates from the 14th-Century. St. Michael's is located on Irstead Road and has been Grade II listed since 1955. The church is open sporadically for Sunday service.

St. Michael's features a carved font and a painted rood screen, which are both medieval survivals. The church also holds a wall painting of Saint Christopher and a stone memorial dating from 1811 to Midshipman Charles Hornor who died aboard the Rose off the coast of Madras.
