= Rood screen =

Partition found in medieval church architecture

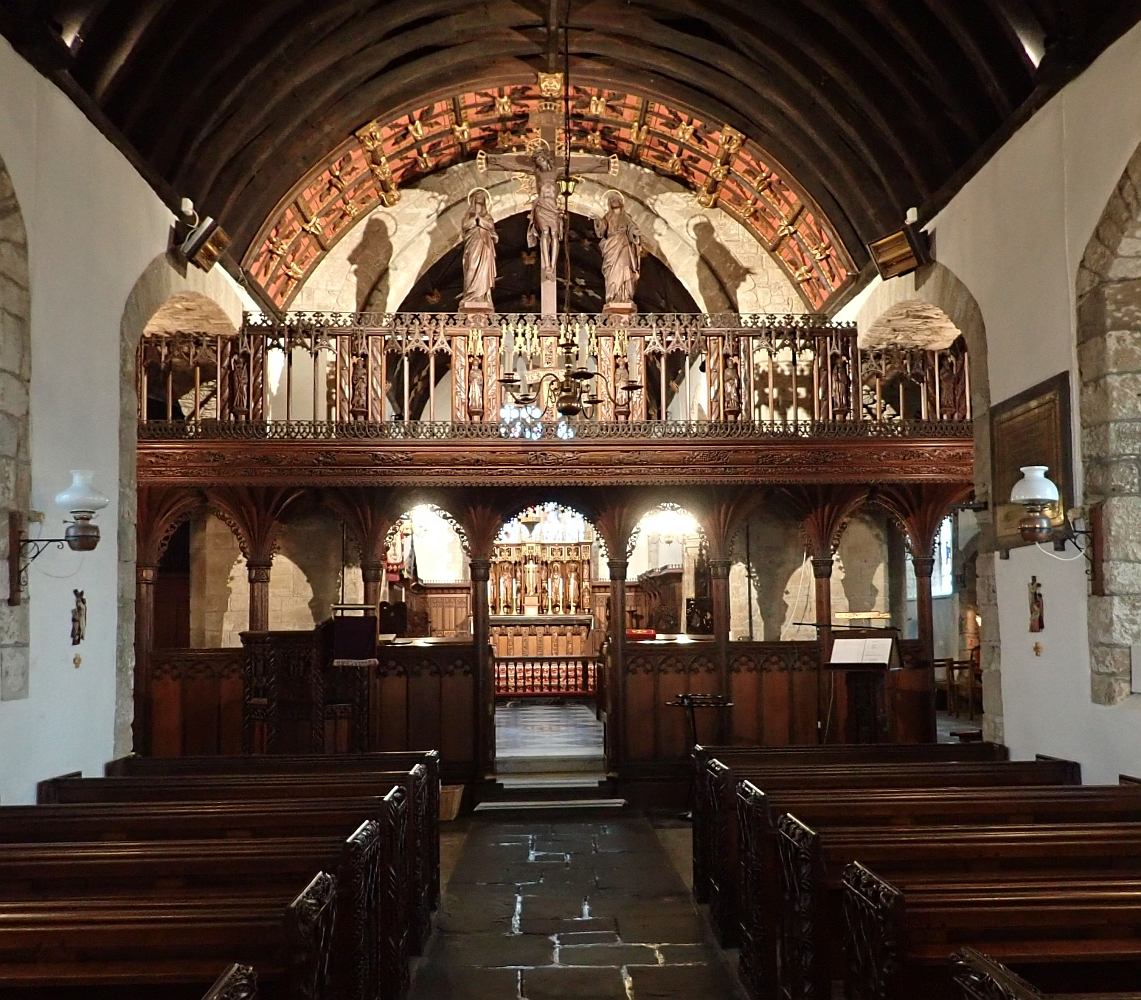
Rood screen, with loft and modern Crucifixion, at St Carantoc's Church, Crantock, Cornwall.

Usual location of a rood screen

The rood screen (also choir screen, chancel screen, or jubé) is a common feature in late medieval church architecture. It is typically an ornate partition between the chancel and nave, of more or less open tracery constructed of wood, stone, or wrought iron. The rood screen was originally surmounted by a rood loft carrying the Great Rood, a sculptural representation of the Crucifixion. In English, Scottish, and Welsh cathedrals, monastic, and collegiate churches, there were commonly two transverse screens, with a rood screen or rood beam located one bay west of the pulpitum, but this double arrangement nowhere survives complete, and accordingly the preserved pulpita in such churches is sometimes referred to as a rood screen. At Wells Cathedral the medieval arrangement was restored in the 20th century, with the medieval strainer arch supporting a rood, placed in front of the pulpitum and organ.

Rood screens can be found in churches in many parts of Europe; however, in Catholic countries they were generally removed during the Counter-Reformation, when the retention of any visual barrier between the laity and the high altar was widely seen as inconsistent with the decrees of the Council of Trent. Accordingly, rood screens now survive in much greater numbers in Evangelical-Lutheran and Anglican churches; with the greatest number of survivals complete with screen and rood figures in Lutheran Scandinavia. A number of rood screens continued to be built in Evangelical-Lutheran churches, such as that of Trondenes Evangelical-Lutheran Church, which was built in the 18th century. The iconostasis in Eastern Christian churches is a visually similar barrier, but is now generally considered to have a different origin, deriving from the ancient altar screen or templon.

== Description and origin of the name ==
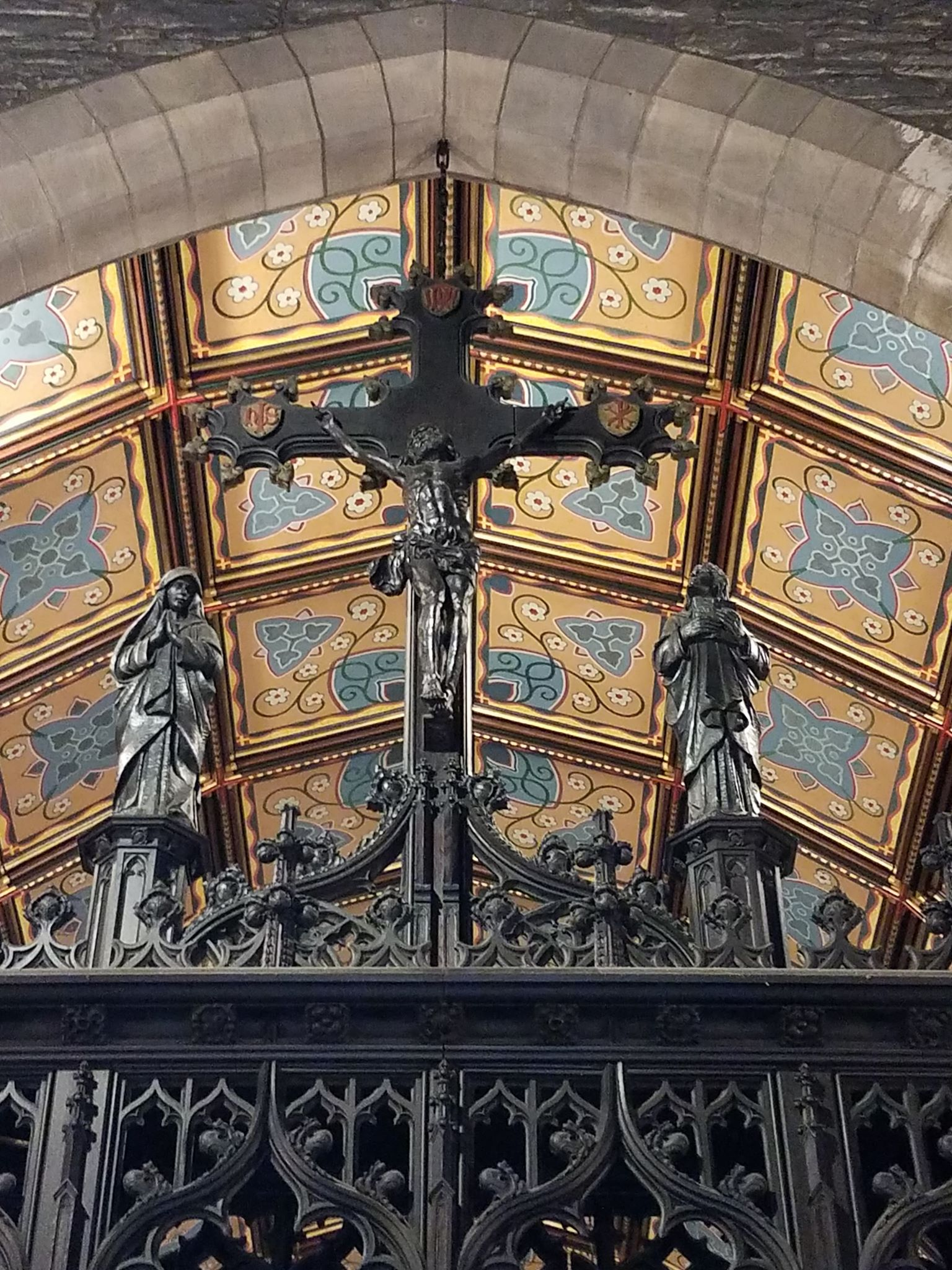
Crucifixion atop Rood Screen, Anglo-Catholic Church of the Good Shepherd (Rosemont, Pennsylvania)

The word rood is derived from the Saxon word rood or rode, meaning "cross". The rood screen is so called because it was surmounted by the Rood itself, a large figure of the crucified Christ. Commonly, to either side of the Rood, there stood supporting statues of saints, normally Mary and St John, in an arrangement comparable to the Deesis always found in the centre of an Orthodox iconostasis (which uses John the Baptist instead of the Apostle, and a Pantokrator instead of a Crucifixion). Latterly in England and Wales the Rood tended to rise above a narrow loft (called the "rood loft"), which could occasionally be substantial enough to be used as a singing gallery (and might even contain an altar); but whose main purpose was to hold candles to light the rood itself. The panels and uprights of the screen did not support the loft, which instead rested on a substantial transverse beam called the "rood beam" or "candle beam". Access was via a narrow rood stair set into the piers supporting the chancel arch. In parish churches, the space between the rood beam and the chancel arch was commonly filled by a boarded or lath and plaster tympanum, set immediately behind the rood figures and painted with a representation of the Last Judgement. The roof panels of the first bay of the nave were commonly richly decorated to form a celure or canopy of honour; or otherwise there might be a separate celure canopy attached to the front of the chancel arch.

The carving or construction of the rood screen often included latticework, which makes it possible to see through the screen partially from the nave into the chancel. The term "chancel" itself derives from the Latin word cancelli meaning "lattice"; a term which had long been applied to the low metalwork or stone screens that delineate the choir enclosure in early medieval Italian cathedrals and major churches. The passage through the rood screen was fitted with doors, which were kept locked except during services.

The terms pulpitum, Lettner, jubé (Note: from the invocation "Jube domne benedicere") and doksaal all suggest a screen platform used for readings from scripture, and there is plentiful documentary evidence for this practice in major churches in Europe in the 16th century. From this it was concluded by Victorian liturgists that the specification ad pulpitum for the location for Gospel lections in the rubrics of the Use of Sarum referred both to the cathedral pulpitum screen and the parish rood loft. However, rood stairs in English parish churches are rarely, if ever, found to have been built wide enough to accommodate the Gospel procession required in the Sarum Use. The specific functions of the late medieval parish rood loft, over and above supporting the rood and its lights, remain an issue of conjecture and debate. In this respect it may be significant that, although there are terms for a rood screen in the vernacular languages of Europe, there is no counterpart specific term in liturgical Latin. Nor does the 13th century liturgical commentator Durandus refer directly to rood screens or rood lofts. This is consistent with the ritual uses of rood lofts being substantially a late medieval development.

== History ==
=== Early medieval altar screens and chancel screens ===
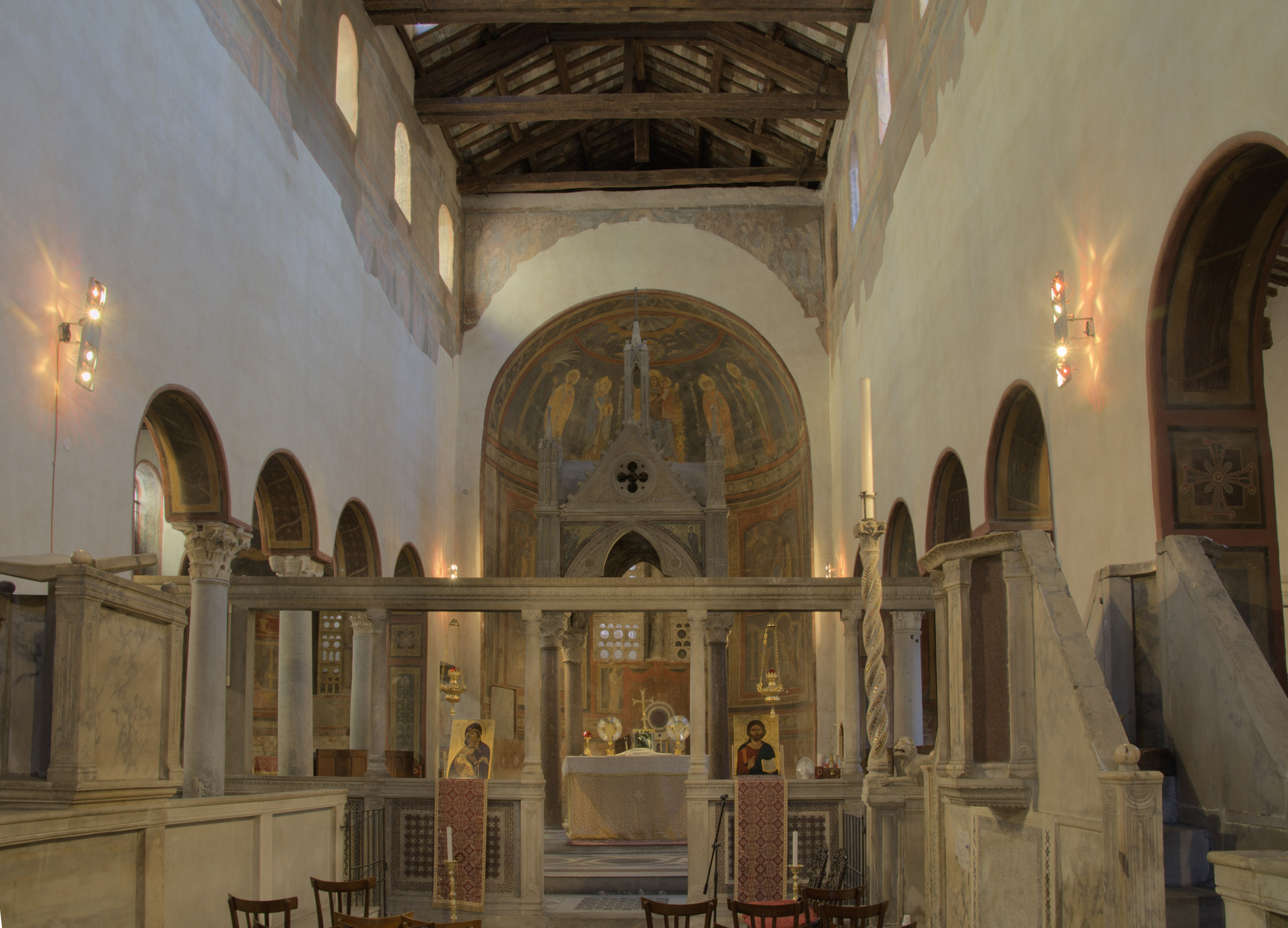
East end of the 8th-century Roman basilica of Santa Maria in Cosmedin in Rome, showing the altar, under a 13th-century ciborium behind a templon screen of columns. The foreground forms the liturgical choir, surrounded by low cancelli screens, to which are attached two ambos, left and right.

Until the 6th century the altar of Christian churches would have been in full view of the congregation, separated only by a low altar rail around it. Large churches had a ciborium, or canopy on four columns, over the altar, from which hung altar curtains which were closed at certain points in the liturgy. Then, however, following the example of the church of Hagia Sophia in Constantinople, churches began to surround their altars with a colonnade or templon which supported a decorated architrave beam along which a curtain could be drawn to veil the altar at specific points in the consecration of the Eucharist; and this altar screen, with widely spaced columns, subsequently became standard in the major churches of Rome. In Rome the ritual choir tended to be located west of the altar screen, and this choir area was also surrounded by cancelli, or low chancel screens. These arrangements still survive in the Roman basilicas of San Clemente and Santa Maria in Cosmedin, as well as St Mark's Basilica in Venice. In the Eastern Church, the templon and its associated curtains and decorations evolved into the modern iconostasis. In the Western Church, the cancelli screens of the ritual choir developed into the choir stalls and pulpitum screen of major cathedral and monastic churches; but the colonnaded altar screen was superseded from the 10th century onwards, when the practice developed of raising a canopy or baldacchino, carrying veiling curtains, over the altar itself.

Many churches in Ireland and Scotland in the early Middle Ages were very small which may have served the same function as a rood screen. Contemporary sources suggest that the faithful may have remained outside the church for most of the mass; the priest would go outside for the first part of the mass including the reading of the gospel, and return inside the church, out of sight of the faithful, to consecrate the Eucharist.

Churches built in England in the 7th and 8th centuries consciously copied Roman practices; remains indicating early cancelli screens have been found in the monastic churches of Jarrow and Monkwearmouth, while the churches of the monasteries of Brixworth, Reculver and St Pancras Canterbury have been found to have had arcaded colonnades corresponding to the Roman altar screen, and it may be presumed that these too were equipped with curtains. Equivalent arcaded colonnades also survive in 10th-century monastic churches in Spain, such as San Miguel de Escalada. Some 19th-century liturgists supposed that these early altar screens might have represented the origins of the medieval rood screens; but this view is rejected by most current scholars, who emphasize that these screens were intended to separate the altar from the ritual choir, whereas the medieval rood screen separated the ritual choir from the lay congregation.

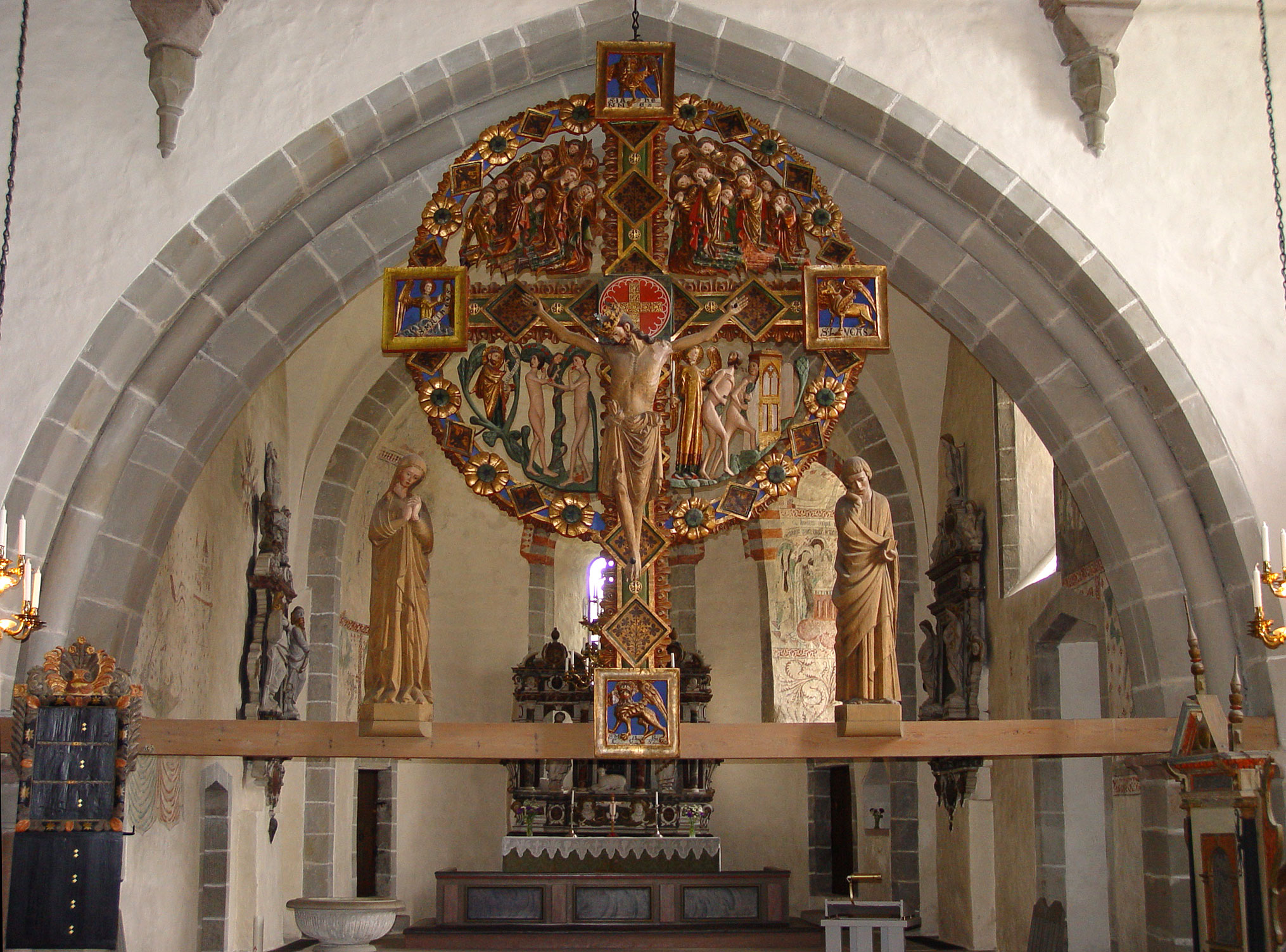
Rood and beam of 1275, but no screen, at Öja Church on the island of Gotland in Sweden, where many exceptional roods have survived.

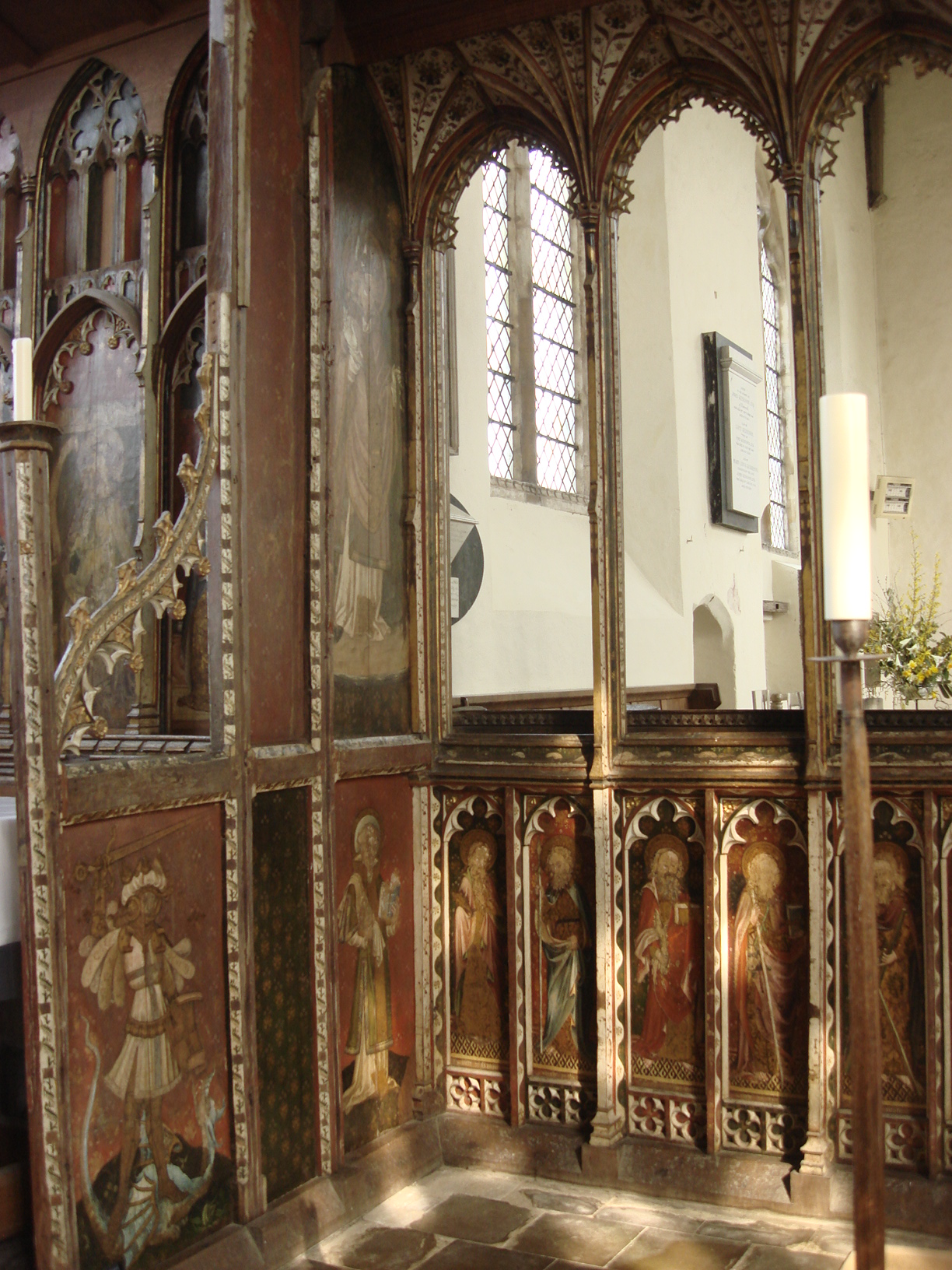
Rood screen in St. Helen's church, Ranworth, Norfolk

=== Great Rood ===
The Great Rood or Rood cross itself long preceded the development of screen lofts, originally being either just hung from the chancel arch or also supported by a plain beam across the arch, and high up, typically at the level of the capitals of the columns (if there are any), or near the point where the arch begins to lean inwards. Numerous near life-size crucifixes survive from the Romanesque period or earlier, with the Gero Cross in Cologne Cathedral (965–970) and the Volto Santo of Lucca the best known. Such crosses are commonly referred to in German as Triumphkreuz or triumphal cross. The prototype may have been one known to have been set up in Charlemagne's Palatine Chapel at Aachen, apparently in gold foil worked over a wooden core in the manner of the Golden Madonna of Essen. The original location and support for the surviving figures is often not clear; many are now hung on walls - but a number of northern European churches, especially in Germany and Scandinavia, preserve the original setting in full – they are known as a "Triumphkreutz" in German, from the "triumphal arch" (chancel arch in later terms) of Early Christian architecture. As in later examples a Virgin and Saint John often flanked the cross, and cherubim and other figures are sometimes seen.

=== Parochial rood screens ===
For most of the medieval period, there would have been no fixed screen or barrier separating the congregational space from the altar space in parish churches in the Latin West; although as noted above, a curtain might be drawn across the altar at specific points in the Mass. Following the exposition of the doctrine of transubstantiation at the fourth Lateran Council of 1215, clergy were required to ensure that the reserved sacrament was to be kept protected from irreverent access or abuse; and accordingly some form of permanent screen came to be seen as essential, as the parish nave was commonly kept open and used for a wide range of secular purposes. Hence the origin of the chancel screen was independent of the Great Rood; indeed most surviving early screens lack lofts, and do not appear ever to have had a rood cross mounted on them. Nevertheless, over time, the rood beam and its sculptures tended to become incorporated into the chancel screen in new or reworked churches. Over the succeeding three centuries, and especially in the latter period when it became standard for the screen to be topped by a rood loft facing the congregation, a range of local ritual practices developed which incorporated the rood and loft into the performance of the liturgy; especially in the Use of Sarum, the form of the missal that was most common in England. For example, during the 40 days of "Lent" the rood in England was obscured by the Lenten Veil, a large hanging suspended by stays from hooks set into the chancel arch; in such a way that it could be dropped abruptly to the ground on Palm Sunday, at the reading of Matthew 27:51 when the Veil of the Temple is torn asunder.

=== Monastic rood screens ===
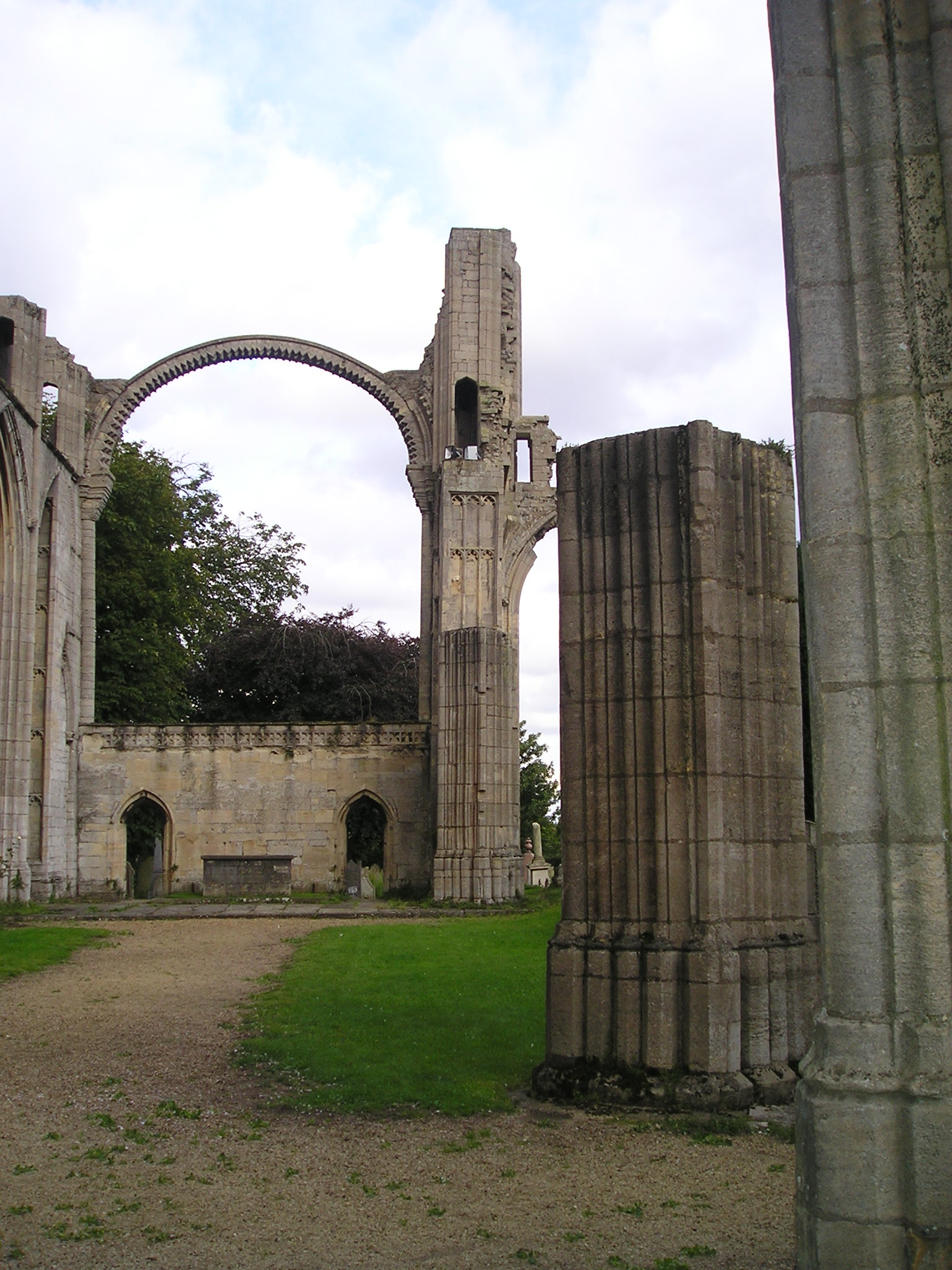
The rood screen and nave altar of Crowland Abbey, Lincolnshire, viewed from the nave. Behind this there would have stood a separate pulpitum, with a central door.

The provisions of the Lateran Council had less effect on monastic churches and cathedrals in England; as these would have already been fitted with two transverse screens; a pulpitum separating off the ritual choir; and an additional rood screen one bay further west, delineating the area of the nave provided for lay worship (or in monastic churches of the Cistercian order, delineating the distinct church area reserved for the worship of lay brothers). The monastic rood screen invariably had a nave altar set against its western face, which, from at least the late 11th century onwards, was commonly dedicated to the Holy Cross; as for example in Norwich Cathedral, and in Castle Acre Priory. In the later medieval period many monastic churches erected an additional transverse parclose screen, or fence screen, to the west of the nave altar; an example of which survives as the chancel screen in Dunstable Priory in Bedfordshire. Hence the Rites of Durham, a detailed account of the liturgical arrangements of Durham Cathedral Priory before the Reformation, describes three transverse screens; fence screen, rood screen and pulpitum. and the same arrangement is also documented in the collegiate church of Ottery St Mary.

In the rest of Europe, this multiple screen arrangement was only found in Cistercian churches, as at Maulbronn Monastery in southern Germany, but many other major churches, such as Albi Cathedral in France, inserted transverse screens in the later medieval period, or reconstructed existing choir screens on a greatly increased scale. In Italy, massive rood screens incorporating an ambo or pulpit facing the nave appear to have been universal in the churches of friars; but not in parish churches, there being no equivalent in the Roman Missal for the ritual elaborations of the Use of Sarum.

=== The screen and Tridentine worship ===
The decrees of the Council of Trent (1545–1563) enjoined that the celebration of the Mass should be made much more accessible to lay worshippers; and this was widely interpreted as requiring the removal of rood screens as physical and visual barriers, even though the council had made no explicit condemnation of screens. Already in 1565, Duke Cosimo de' Medici ordered the removal of the tramezzi from the Florentine friary churches of Santa Croce and Santa Maria Novella in accordance with the principles of the council. In 1577 Carlo Borromeo published Instructionum Fabricae et Sellectilis Ecclesiasticae libri duo, making no mention of the screen and emphasizing the importance of making the high altar visible to all worshippers; and in 1584 the Church of the Gesù was built in Rome as a demonstration of the new principles of Tridentine worship, having an altar rail but conspicuously lacking either a central rood or screen. Almost all medieval churches in Italy were subsequently re-ordered following this model; and most screens that impeded the view of the altar were removed, or their screening effect reduced, in other Catholic countries, with exceptions like Toledo Cathedral, Albi Cathedral, the church of Brou in Bourg-en-Bresse; and also in monasteries and convents, where the screen was preserved to maintain the enclosure. In Catholic Europe, parochial rood screens survive in substantial numbers only in Brittany, such as those at Plouvorn, Morbihan and Ploubezre.

== Symbolic significance ==
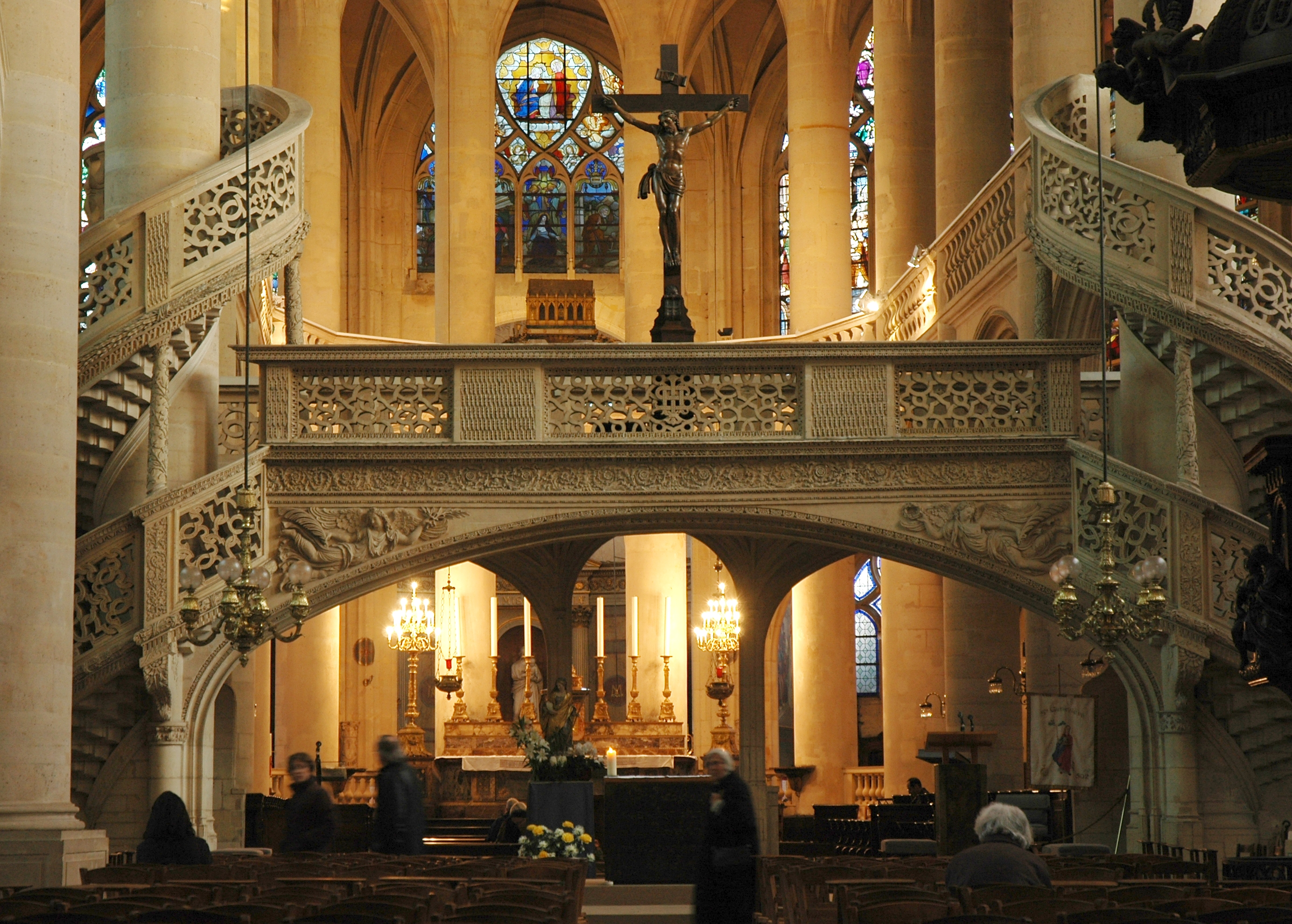
The rood on a rood screen: a crucifix on the elaborate 16th-century jube in the church of Saint-Étienne-du-Mont, Paris

The rood screen was a physical and symbolic barrier, separating the chancel, the domain of the clergy, from the nave where laity gathered to worship. It was also a means of seeing; often it was solid only to waist height and richly decorated with pictures of saints and angels. Concealment and revelation were part of the mediaeval Mass. When kneeling, the congregation could not see the priest, but might do so through the upper part of the screen, when he elevated the Host on the Lord's Day (Sundays). In some churches, 'squints' (holes in the screen) would ensure that everyone could see the elevation, as seeing the bread made flesh was significant for the congregation.

Moreover, while Sunday Masses were very important, there were also weekday services which were celebrated at secondary altars in front of the screen (such as the "Jesus altar", erected for the worship of the Holy Name, a popular devotion in mediaeval times) which thus became the backdrop to the celebration of the Mass. The Rood itself provided a focus for worship according to the medieval Use of Sarum, most especially in Holy Week, when worship was highly elaborate. During Lent the Rood was veiled; on Palm Sunday it was revealed before the procession of palms and the congregation knelt before it. The whole Passion story would then be read from the Rood loft, at the foot of the crucifix by three priests. In the 1400s the rood screen in Dovercourt, became a shrine when it gained a reputation for speaking.

== Post-Reformation, in England ==
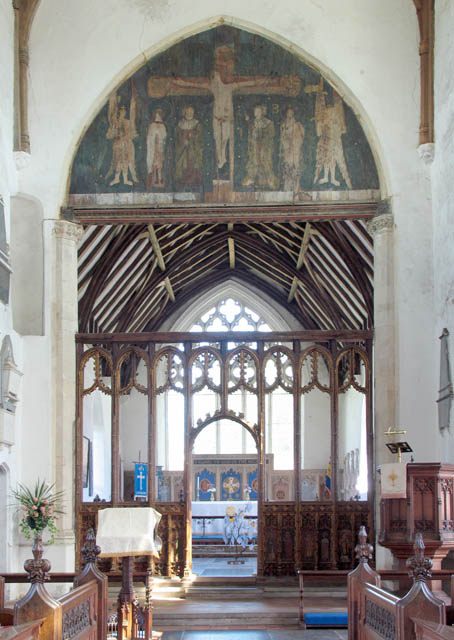
The rood screen of St Catherine's Church, Ludham, with a painted rood over (viewed from the nave).

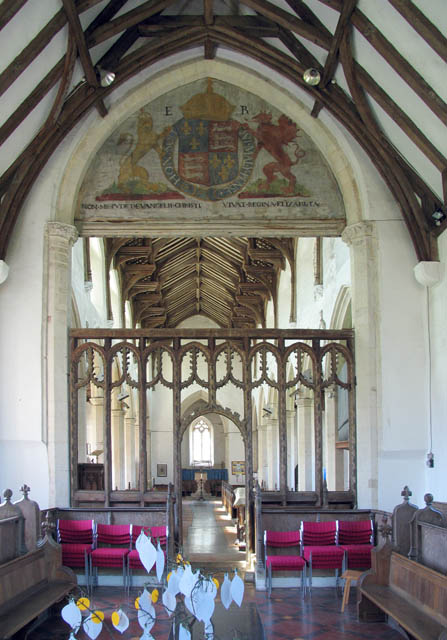
The same screen, viewed from the chancel. The rood only survived because the royal arms were displayed on it (at that time, the boards were reversed so that the royal arms faced the nave; they have since been restored to their original orientation).

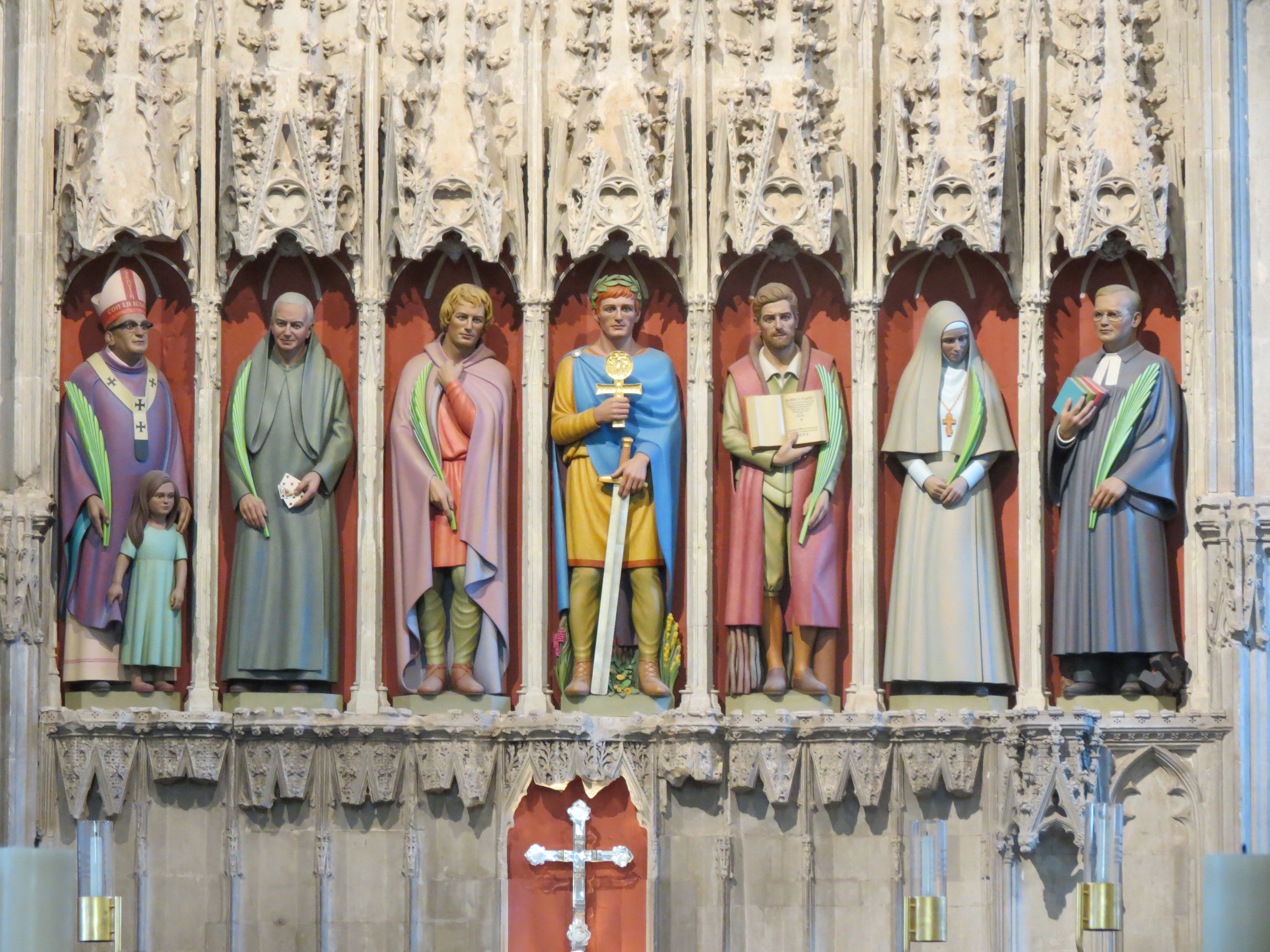
A surviving English monastic rood screen at St Albans Abbey

At the time of the Protestant Reformation in England, the Calvinist Reformers sought to destroy abused images, i.e. those statues and paintings which they alleged to have been the focus of superstitious adoration. Thus not a single mediaeval Rood survives completely intact in Britain. They were removed as a result of the 1547 Injunctions of Edward VI (some to be restored when Mary I came to the throne and removed again under Elizabeth I). Of original rood lofts, also considered suspect due to their association with superstitious veneration, very few are left; surviving examples in Wales being at the ancient churches in Llanelieu, Llanengan and Llanegryn. The rood screens themselves were sometimes demolished or cut down in height, but more commonly remained with their painted figures whitewashed and painted over with religious texts. Tympana too were whitewashed. English cathedral churches maintained their choirs, and consequently their choir stalls and pulpita; but generally demolished their rood screens entirely, although those of Peterborough and Canterbury survived into the 18th century.

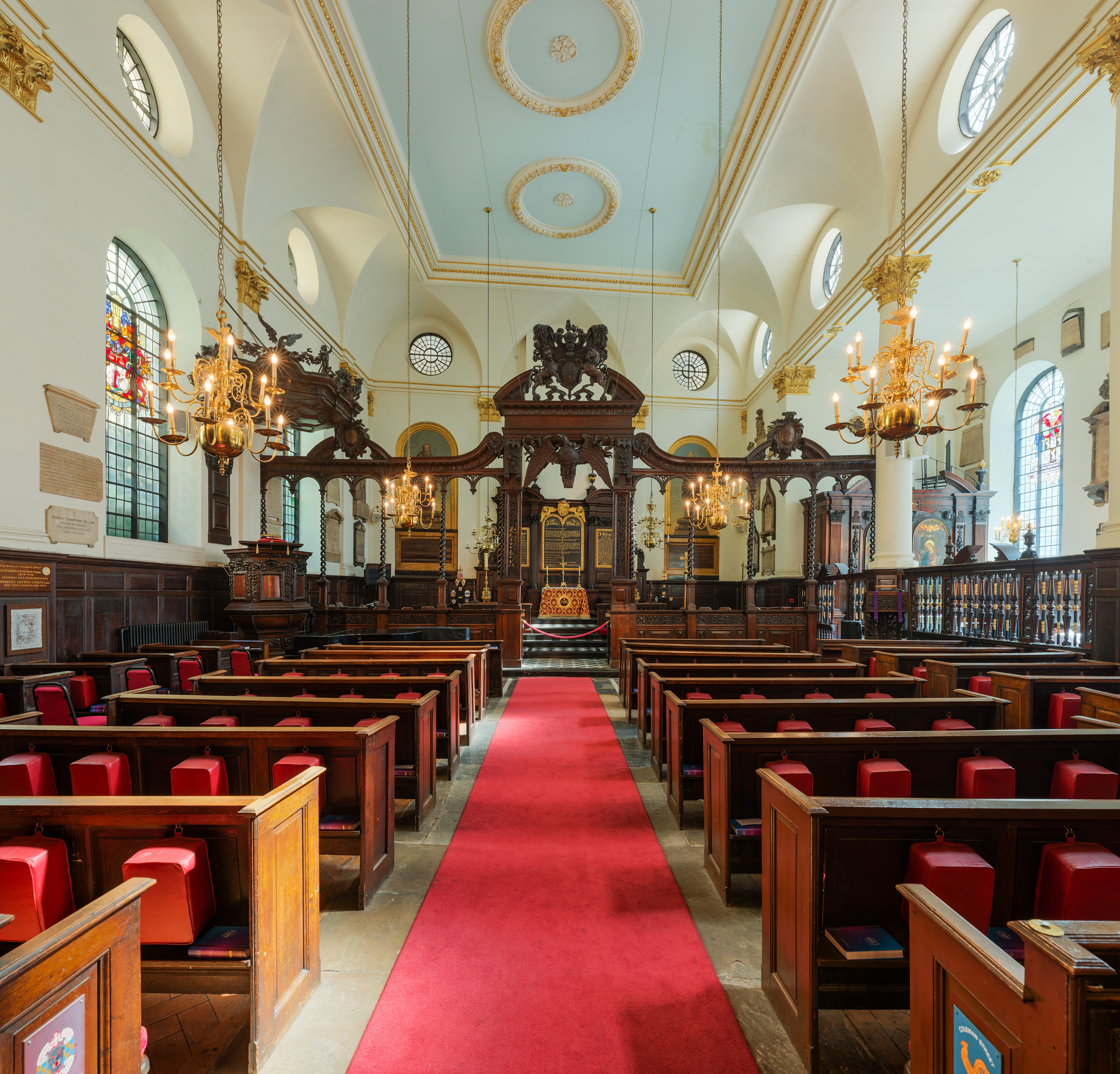
A 17th-century chancel screen by Christopher Wren originally from All-Hallows-the-Great, Thames Street, City of London (now in St Margaret Lothbury). At right is a low parclose screen separating the south aisle from the nave

In the century following the English Reformation newly built Anglican churches were invariably fitted with chancel screens, which served the purpose of differentiating a separate space in the chancel for communicants at Holy Communion, as was required in the newly adopted Book of Common Prayer. In effect, these chancel screens were rood screens without a surmounting loft or crucifix, and examples survive at St John Leeds and at Foremark. New screens were also erected in some medieval churches where they had been destroyed at the Reformation, as at Cartmel Priory and Abbey Dore. From the early 17th century it became normal for screens or tympanums to carry the royal arms of England, good examples of which survive in two of the London churches of Sir Christopher Wren, and also at Derby Cathedral. However, Wren's design for the church of St James, Piccadilly, of 1684 dispensed with a chancel screen, retaining only rails around the altar itself, and this auditory church plan was widely adopted as a model for new churches from then on. In the 18th and 19th centuries hundreds of surviving medieval screens were removed altogether; today, in many British churches, the rood stair (which gave access to the rood loft) is often the only remaining trace of the former rood loft and screen.

In the 19th century, the architect Augustus Pugin campaigned for the re-introduction of rood screens into Catholic church architecture. His screens survive in Macclesfield and Cheadle, Staffordshire, although others have been removed. In Anglican churches, under the influence of the Cambridge Camden Society, many medieval screens were restored; though until the 20th century, generally without roods or with only a plain cross rather than a crucifix. A nearly complete restoration can be seen at Eye, Suffolk, where the rood screen dates from 1480. Its missing rood loft was reconstructed by Sir Ninian Comper in 1925, complete with a rood and figures of saints and angels, and gives a good impression of how a full rood group might have appeared in a mediaeval English church - except that the former tympanum has not been replaced. Indeed, because tympanums, repainted with the royal arms, were erroneously considered post-medieval, they were almost all removed in the course of 19th-century restorations. For parish churches, the 19th-century Tractarians tended, however, to prefer an arrangement whereby the chancel was distinguished from the nave only by steps and a low-gated screen wall or septum (as at All Saints, Margaret Street), so as not to obscure the congregation's view of the altar. This arrangement was adopted for almost all new Anglican parish churches of the period.

== Notable examples ==
=== Nordic-Baltic region ===
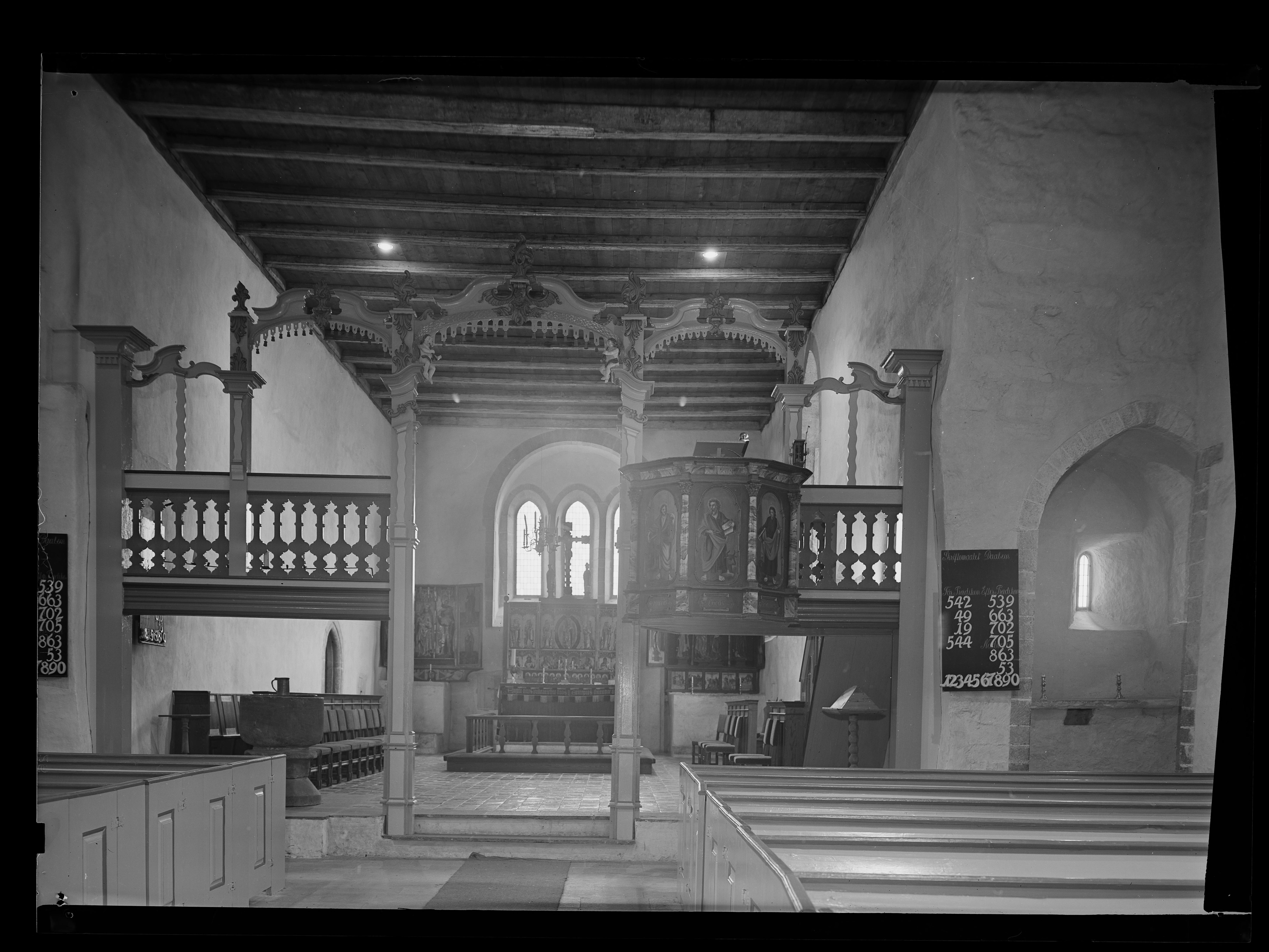
The rood screen of Trondenes Evangelical-Lutheran Church, the world's northernmost surviving medieval building

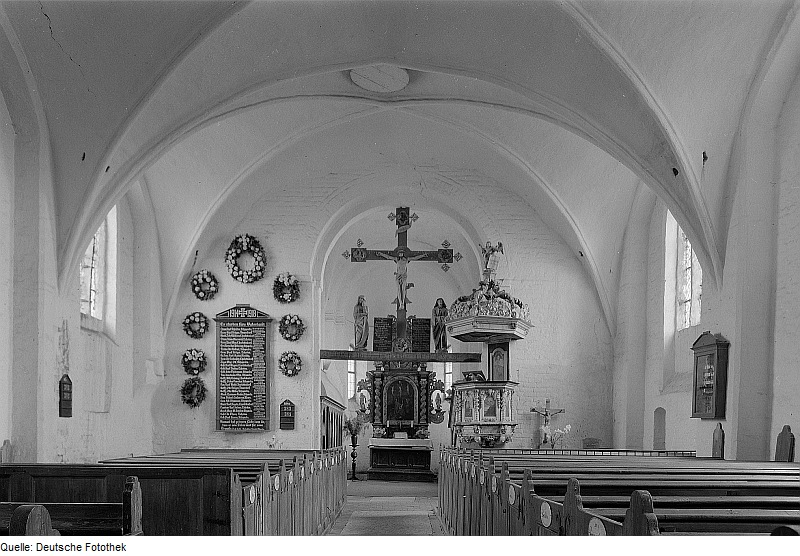
The rood screen of Stankt Johannes Evangelical-Lutheran church in Schaprode, Rügen

The rood screen remained a part of churches built in the medieval era in the Nordic-Baltic region. These Evangelical-Lutheran churches have preserved this structure. Trondenes Evangelical-Lutheran Church, the world's northernmost surviving medieval building, has a rood screen that was built in the 18th century.

=== Belgium ===
The Basilica of Saint Maternus has a richly decorated rood screen from 1531, in a late Gothic style. Tradition holds that it was donated to the church by Emperor Charles V.

=== Britain ===
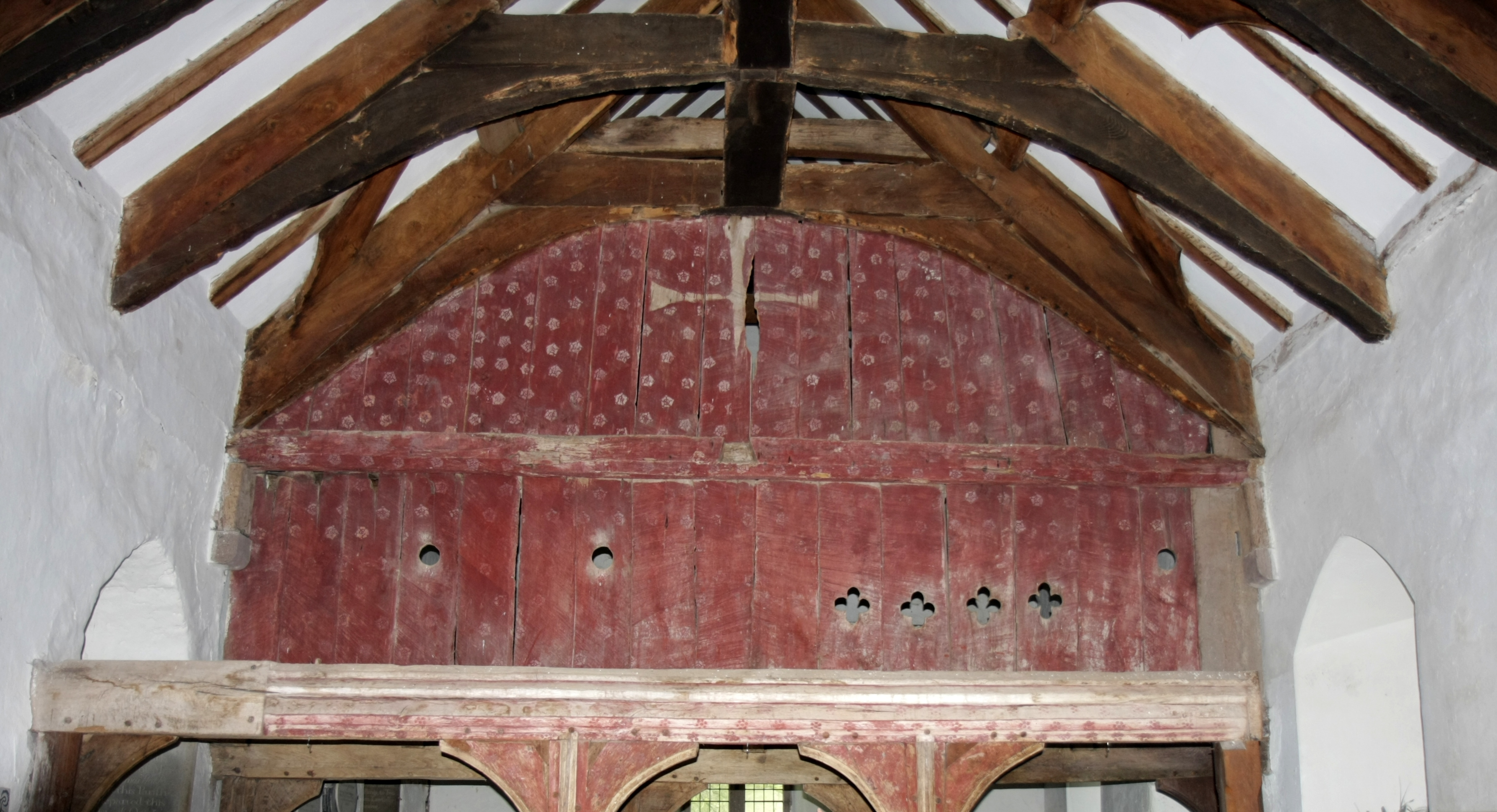
14th-century painted rood loft in St Ellyw's Church, Llanelieu, Powys

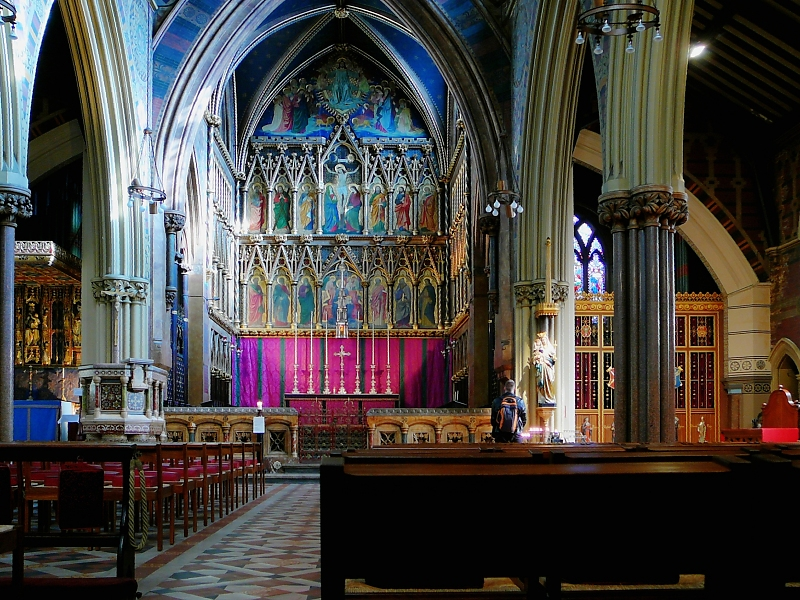
All Saints, Margaret Street, London

The earliest known example of a parochial rood screen in Britain, dating to the mid-13th century, is to be found at Stanton Harcourt, Oxfordshire; and a notable early stone screen (14th century) is found at Ilkeston, Derbyshire. Both these screens lack lofts, as do all surviving English screens earlier than the 15th century. However, some early screens, now lost, may be presumed to have had a loft surmounted by the Great Rood, as the churches of Colsterworth and Thurlby in Lincolnshire preserve rood stairs which can be dated stylistically to the beginning of the 13th century, and these represent the earliest surviving evidence of parochial screens; effectively contemporary with the Lateran Council.

The majority of surviving screens are no earlier than the 15th century, such as those at Trull in Somerset and Attleborough in Norfolk. Almost all have lost their rood beams and lofts, and many have been sawn off at the top of the panelled lower section. Painted rood screens occur rarely, but some of the best surviving examples are in East Anglia, with other survivals concentrated in Devon. The quality of the painting and gilding can reach a very high order, notably those from the East Anglian Ranworth school of painters, of which examples can be found in Southwold and Blythburgh, as well as at Ranworth itself. The magnificent painted screen at St Michael and All Angels Church, Barton Turf in Norfolk is unique in giving an unusually complete view of the heavenly hierarchy, including nine orders of angels. Nikolaus Pevsner also identified the early-16th-century painted screen at Bridford, Devon, as being notable. The 16th-century screen at Charlton-on-Otmoor, said by Pevsner to be "the finest in Oxfordshire", has an unusual custom associated with it, where the rood cross is garlanded with flowers and foliage twice a year, and until the 1850s the cross (which at that time resembled a large corn dolly) was carried in a May Day procession. A particularly large example can be found at the Church of St Mary the Virgin, Uffculme, Devon, which is nearly 70 feet in length.

== See also ==
- Altarpiece – Religious artwork behind an altar
- Altar screen – Ornamental cloth or panel hung behind an altar
- Dossal – Ornamental cloth or panel hung behind an altar
- Iconostasis – Screen dividing Eastern Orthodox churches
- Reredos – Altarpiece, or a screen or decoration behind the altar in a church
- Retable – Structure or element placed on or behind an altar or communion table
