= St Michael and All Angels Church, Barton Turf =

Church in Barton Turf, Norfolk, England

Coordinates: 52.7439°N 1.4703°E

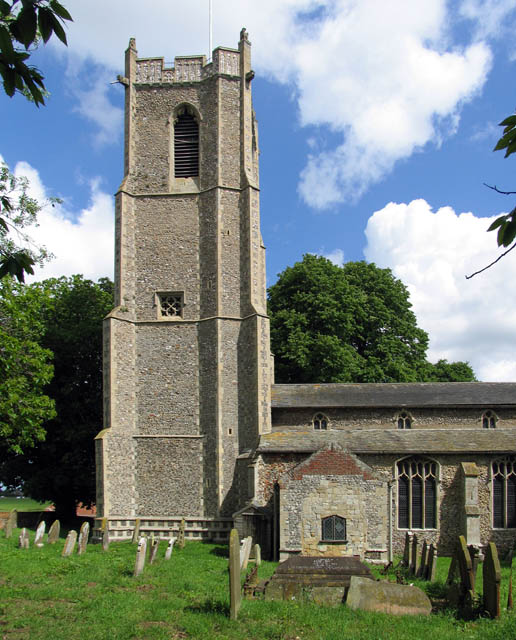
St. Michael and All Angels

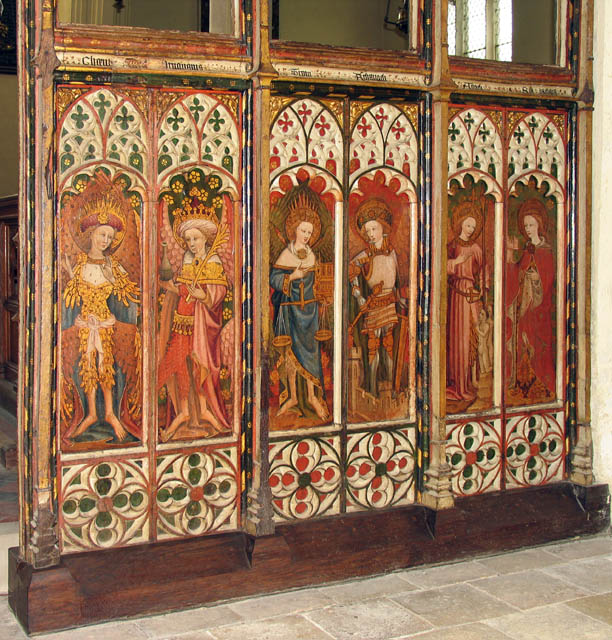
Right choir screen

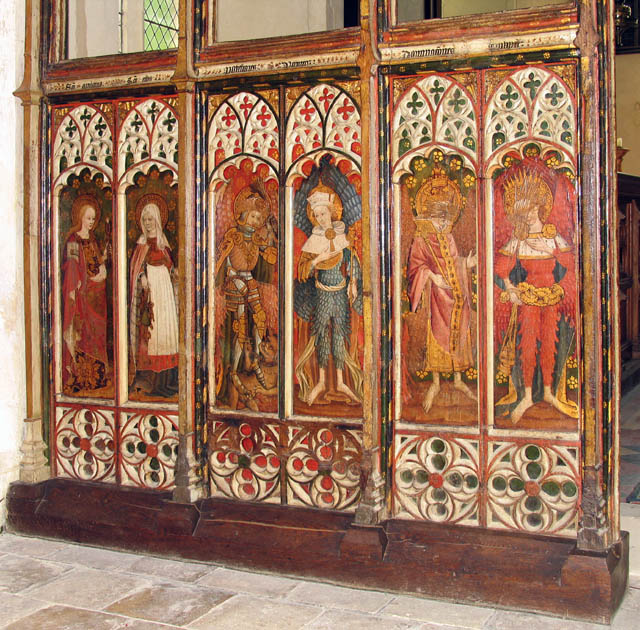
Left choir screen

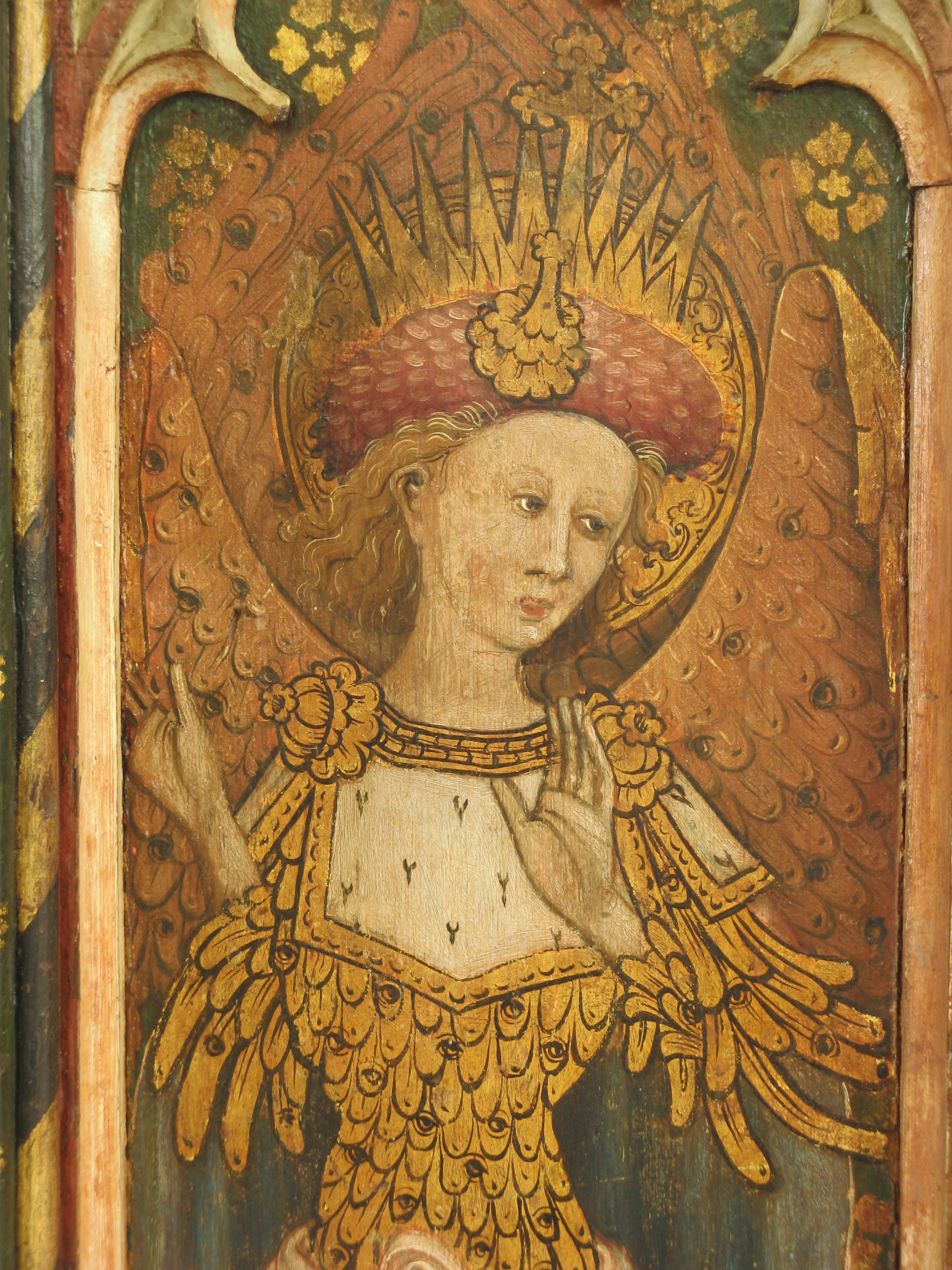
Cherubim (detail) from rood screen

St Michael and All Angels is the Church of England parish church of Barton Turf in the county of Norfolk in England. It stands about a kilometre south-west of the village in the midst of a plantation of trees. Particularly notable for its surviving paintings, the church is listed with Grade I.

== Architecture and Decor ==
The building was at first constructed in rather an undistinguished Perpendicular style, possessing a tower at the west end of the church. The church is best known for the twelve panels of its late-Gothic rood screen, rivalled in quality only by the rood screen of St. Helen's Church in Ranworth. The twelve panels, probably from between 1440 and 1450, appear to have been influenced by Flemish work, and depict St. Apollonia, St. Zita, St. Barbara, and the nine choirs of angels. (The representations of the Dominions and the Seraphim were defaced during the English Civil War, most likely due to their inclusion of “papistical” symbols such as the tiara and a censer). In the South Nave there are more recent (ca. 1490) representations of King Henry VI, St. Edmund, St. Edward the Confessor, and St. Olaf.

The church holds a pipe organ built in 1835 by T.C. Bates. The single-manual instrument has 5 registers (C-g^{3}: Open Diapason 8', Clarabella 8', Stopt Diapason Bass 8', Principal 4', Flute 4').

== Bibliography ==
- Simon Jenkins: England’s Thousand Best Churches. Allen Lane – The Penguin Press, 1999, S. 444, ISBN 0-713-99281-6.
- Peter Sager: Ostengland. DuMont Kunst-Reiseführer, Köln 1990: DuMont Buchverlag, S. 412 mit Farbabb., ISBN 3-7701-1713-1.
