= Church of St Helen, Ranworth =

Coordinates: 52.6794°N 1.484°E

Church of St Helen
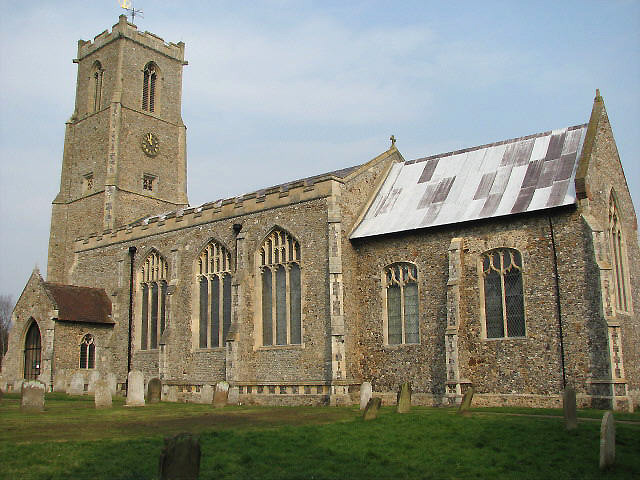

- Location in Norfolk
- Location: Ranworth, Norfolk
- Country: England
- Denomination: Church of England
- Website: www.ranworthchurch.com

History
- Founded: 14th century
- Dedication: Saint Helen

Architecture
- Heritage designation: Grade I
- Designated: 25 September 1962

Administration
- Diocese: Diocese of Norwich
- Parish: Ranworth with Panxworth

Clergy
- Vicar: Interregnum

The Church of St Helen, Ranworth, Norfolk is a church of medieval origins notable for its collection of church paintings. Known as "the Cathedral of The Broads", the church dates from the 14th century, although with origins in Saxon times. It contains a major collection of medieval artefacts, in particular the church's rood screen and the Ranworth Antiphoner, a liturgical manuscript. The church remains an active parish church and is a Grade I listed building.

== History ==
Known as "the Cathedral of The Broads", Historic England's listing record describes St Helen's as of the 15th century, although other sources date it to the 14th. Pevsner records roof beams bearing the date 1370. Restoration took place at the end of the 19th/early 20th centuries to prevent complete collapse. A fire in 1963 destroyed the thatched chancel roof, but otherwise caused "little damage".

The significance of the church lies mainly in its late medieval decoration, particularly of the rood screen. Simon Jenkins considers the work "England's finest church screen paintings". The Twelve Apostles are represented in painted panels on the rood screen itself, with a total of 26 saints and bishops shown in panels elsewhere in the church. Pevsner dates them to the 1470s or 1480s and describes their "superb quality".

St Helen's remains a functioning church in the parish of Ranworth with Panxworth.

== Architecture and description ==
The church was begun in the Decorated Gothic style of the 14th century, although Pevsner notes the predominant influence of the Perpendicular style of a century later. It is of Rubble construction with Clipsham stone dressings. A three-storey tower, at the western end of the church, is followed by a nave, with two porches, and a chancel. The church is a Grade I listed building although, beyond the interior paintings, Jenkins considers it as "of limited architectural interest".

The interior also contains a field altar, used during World War I by the Reverend Teddy Everard, subsequently vicar of Ranworth, as well as a memorial panel commemorating the 14 men of the parish killed in the war.

A distinctive feature of the church is its tower, which visitors could climb via 89 steps and two ladders to reach a viewing platform offering views of Malthouse Broad, Ranworth Broad and the surrounding countryside. Unlike many church towers in the United Kingdom, it was regularly accessible to the public. As of 2026, access to the tower is temporarily closed pending repairs, with an aim to re-open in 2027.

== Ranworth Antiphoner ==
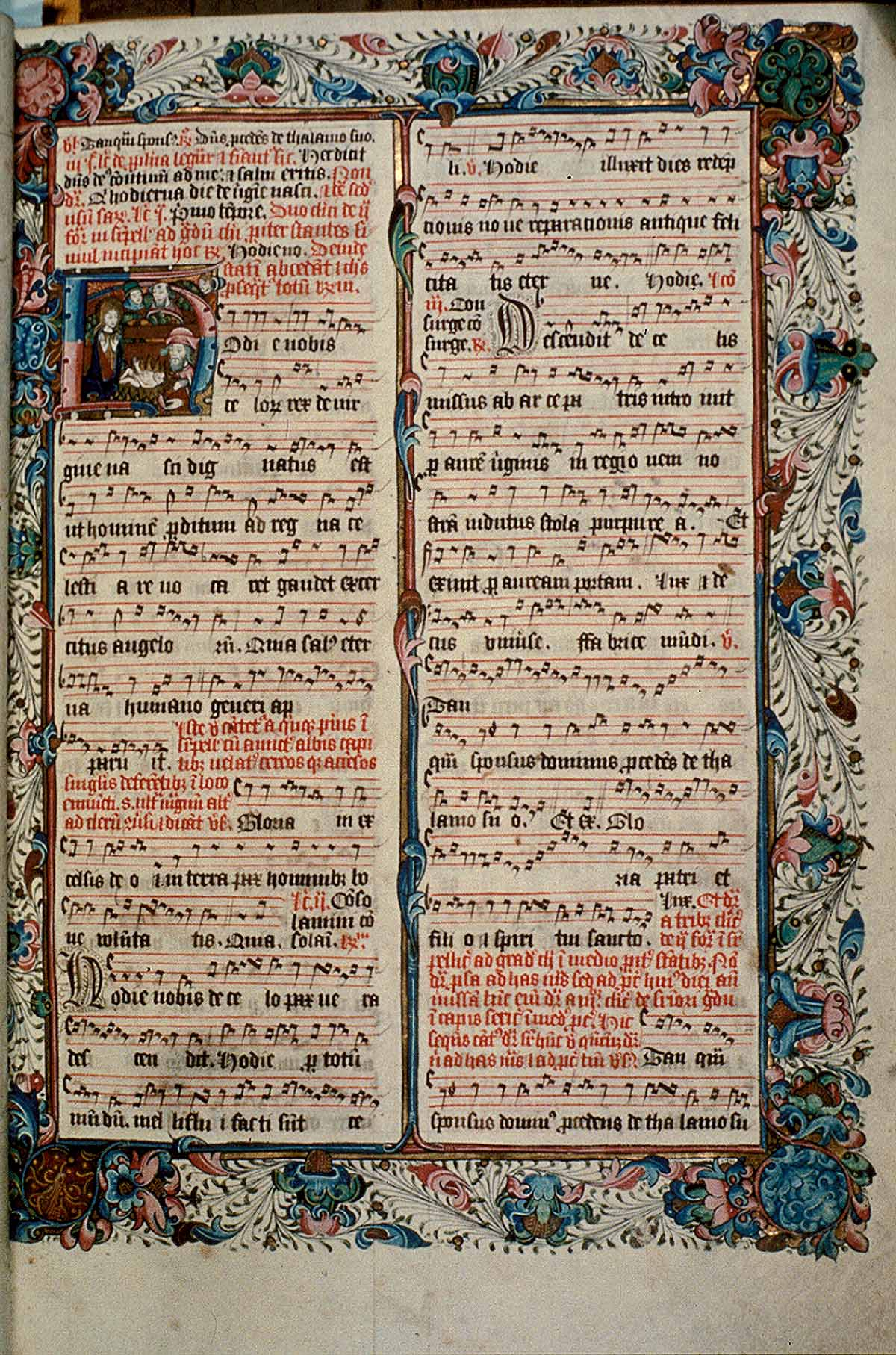
Folio 22r of the Ranworth Antiphoner contains a portion of Mattins of the Nativity. The decorated initial contains a Nativity scene.

The Ranworth Antiphoner is a 15th-century illuminated antiphoner of the Sarum Rite. It was commissioned for the church and is on permanent display there. The volume comprises 285 vellum pages of writing and illustrations, with daily services in medieval Latin and 19 miniatures.

The manuscript was probably the Antiphoner bequeathed to the church in 1478 by William Cobbe. Previously thought to have been produced by the monks of Langley Abbey in Norfolk, examinations of the illuminations suggest that the Antiphoner was manufactured by a Norwich workshop – a basic antiphoner could be produced on spec, and personalised to order. Two things may back this up: the insertion at the end, out of order, of the office of St Helen; and Revd. Enraght's suggestion of a terminus ante quem of 1443, owing to the lack of a feast of St Raphael, which was instituted in that year. Recent research has shown that it was not uncommon for churches to invest in liturgical music books by the later fifteenth century.

The Antiphoner survived the Reformation, probably thanks to the local Holdych family. It fell into private hands, including, in the 1850s, those of Henry Huth, and eventually re-surfaced at auction in 1912, where it was bought and returned to the church.
