= Ranworth =

Village in Norfolk, England

Coordinates: 52.677628°N 1.488189°E

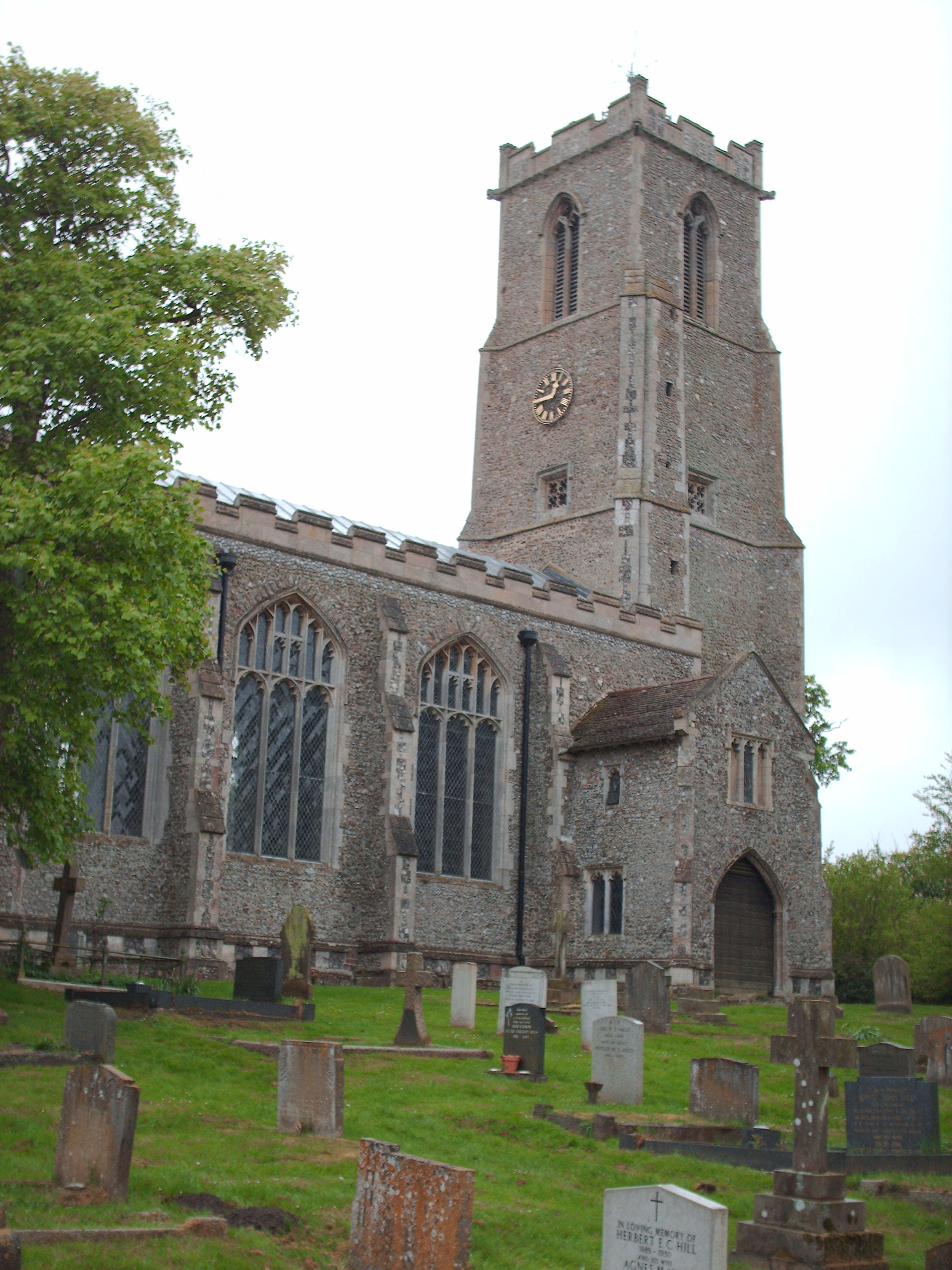
- St Helen's church

- Location within Norfolk
- OS grid reference: TG359145
- Civil parish: Woodbastwick
- District: Broadland
- Shire county: Norfolk
- Region: East
- Country: England
- Sovereign state: United Kingdom
- Post town: NORWICH
- Postcode district: NR13
- UK Parliament: Broadland and Fakenham

Ranworth is a village in Norfolk, England in The Broads, adjacent to Malthouse Broad and Ranworth Broad. It is located in the civil parish of Woodbastwick.

The village's name origin is uncertain 'Edge enclosure' or perhaps, 'Randi's enclosure.'

== Church of St Helen ==
The 16th-century Church of St Helen, known as 'the Cathedral of the Broads', has a fine 15th century painted rood screen and a rare Antiphoner. It is a Grade I listed building. From the top of Ranworth church's 100-foot (30 m) tower one can see many of the broads and rivers, as well as the Happisburgh lighthouse.

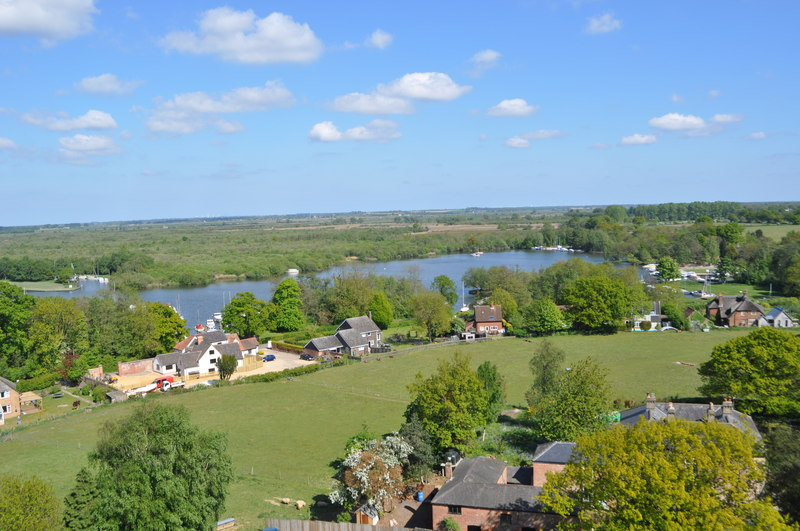
Malthouse Broad from Ranworth church tower

== Notes ==
http://kepn.nottingham.ac.uk/map/place/Norfolk/Ranworth%20with%20Panxworth
