= Cancellarii =

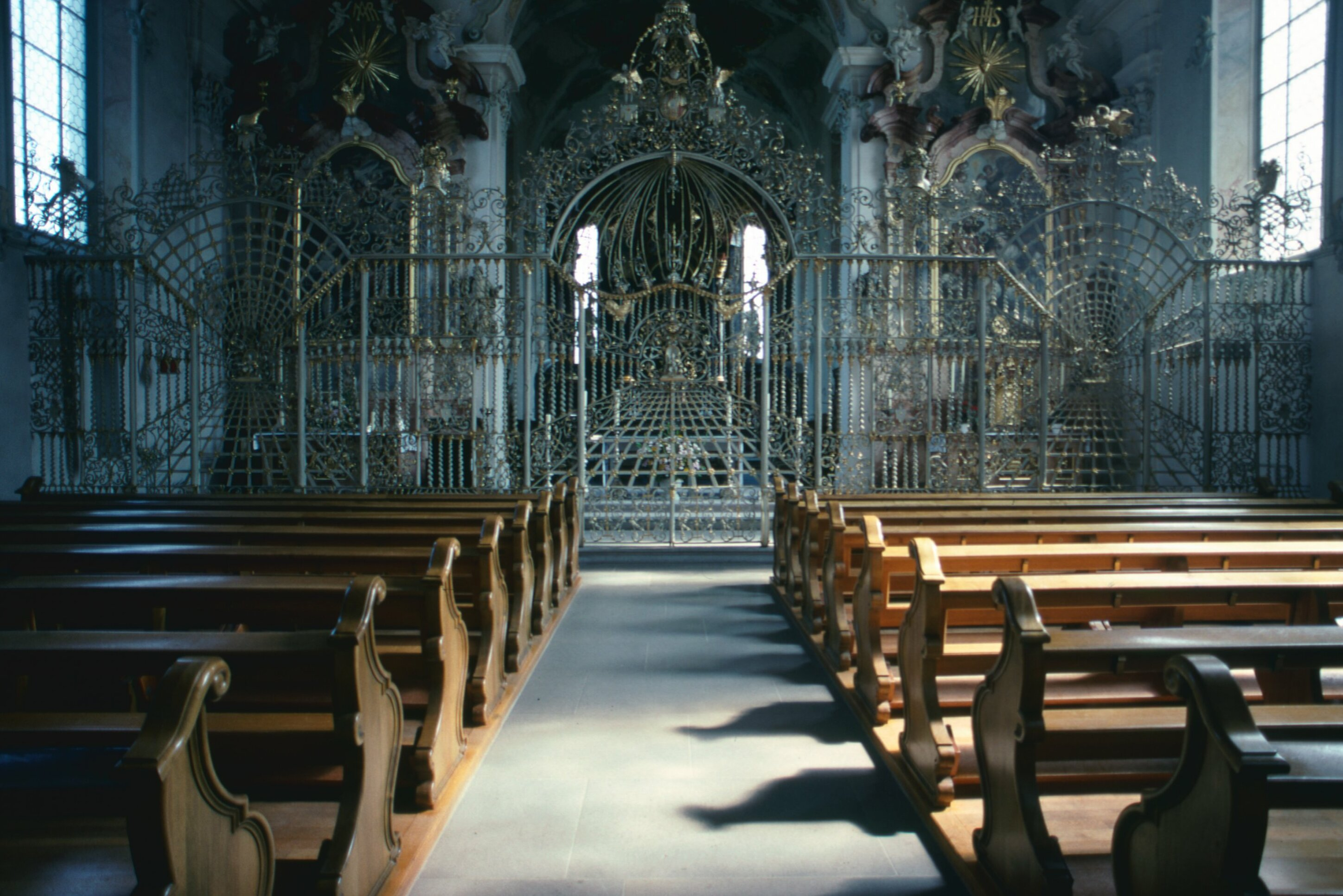
Cancelli at a church in Kreuzlingen, Switzerland

Cancelli are lattice-work, placed before a window, a door-way, the tribunal of a judge, the chancel of a church, or any other similar place.

This led to the occupation of cancellarius, which originally signified a porter who stood at the latticed or grated door of the emperor's palace. According to the Historia Augusta, the emperor Carinus (reigned 283–285) gave great dissatisfaction by promoting one of these cancellarii to city prefect, although the veracity of this account is disputed. (Note: A large amount of the Historia Augusta is recognised by historians to be inaccurate or false (see Historia Augusta § Historical value). The lack of any recorded mention of a cancellarius prior to the fifth century led the historian Otto Seeck to believe that the Historia Augusta was a fifth-century forgery.)

Other cancellarii were legal scribes or secretaries who sat within the lattice-work which protected the tribunals of the judges from the crowd. The chief scribe in Constantinople was eventually invested with judicial power, and from this office came the modern "chancellor".

== See also ==
- Glossary of architecture
