= Coventry Mystery Plays =

English cycle of medieval mystery plays

Coventry Carol
The Coventry Carol, describes the Massacre of the Innocents. Performed by the U.S. Army Band Chorus.

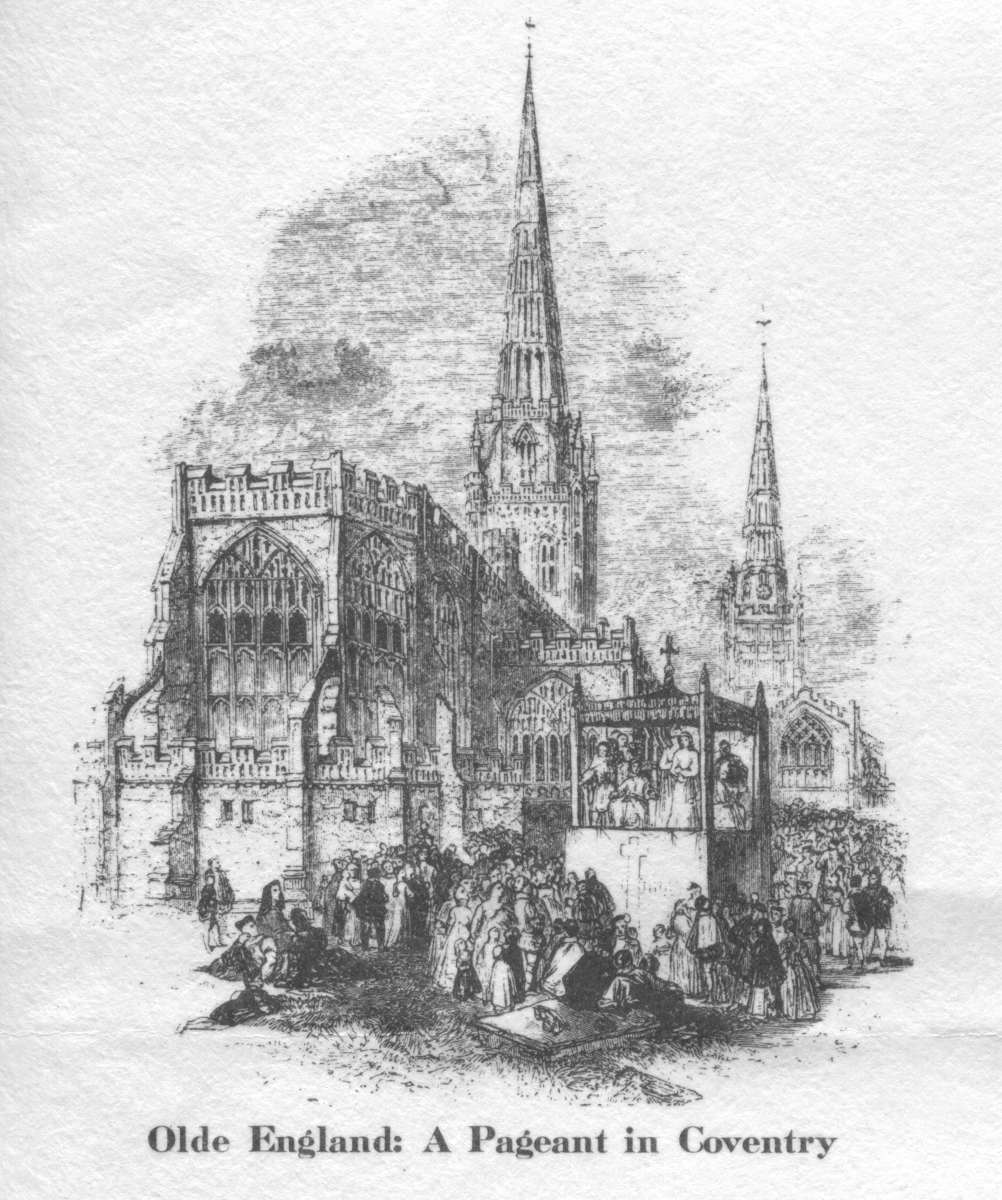
A Pageant in Coventry

The Coventry Mystery Plays, or Coventry Corpus Christi Pageants, are a cycle of medieval mystery plays from Coventry, West Midlands, England, and are perhaps best known as the source of the "Coventry Carol". Two plays from the original cycle are extant, having been copied from the now lost original manuscript in the early 19th century. Another, separate manuscript (BL MS Cotton Vespasian D.8) was initially titled the Ludus Coventriae by a 17th-century librarian who erroneously assumed it was a copy of the Coventry mystery plays. The collection within this manuscript is now more commonly known as the N-Town Plays and is thought to have originated in East Anglia.

== Details ==
Performances of the Coventry Plays are first recorded in a document of 1392–3, and continued for nearly two centuries; the young Shakespeare may have witnessed them before they were finally suppressed in 1579. Latterly, the plays were performed in a version revised by one Robert Croo in 1535.

At the height of their popularity, performances would have been lavish productions that attracted people from all over England. Richard III visited Coventry and saw the plays there on Corpus Christi day in 1485, just a couple of months before he was killed at the Battle of Bosworth. Henry VII and Elizabeth of York came to see the plays in 1493 and gave them great commendacions. The antiquarian William Dugdale, writing in the mid-17th century, gives an idea of the scale of audiences based on memories of those who had attended the plays in their youth:

…I have been told by some old people, who in their younger years were eye-witnesses of these Pageants so acted, that the yearly confluence of people to see that show was so extraordinary great, and yielded no small advantage to this City.

In its fullest form, the cycle comprised about ten plays, all on New Testament themes, though only two have survived to the present day. Of these two, the Shearmen and Tailors' Pageant was a nativity play portraying events from the Annunciation to the Massacre of the Innocents, and the Weavers' Pageant dealt with the Purification and the Doctors in the Temple. The only ancient manuscript of the Shearmen and Tailors' Pageant was destroyed by fire in 1879; fortunately it had been transcribed and published by Thomas Sharp, first in a limited run of twelve copies in 1817, and then again in 1825.

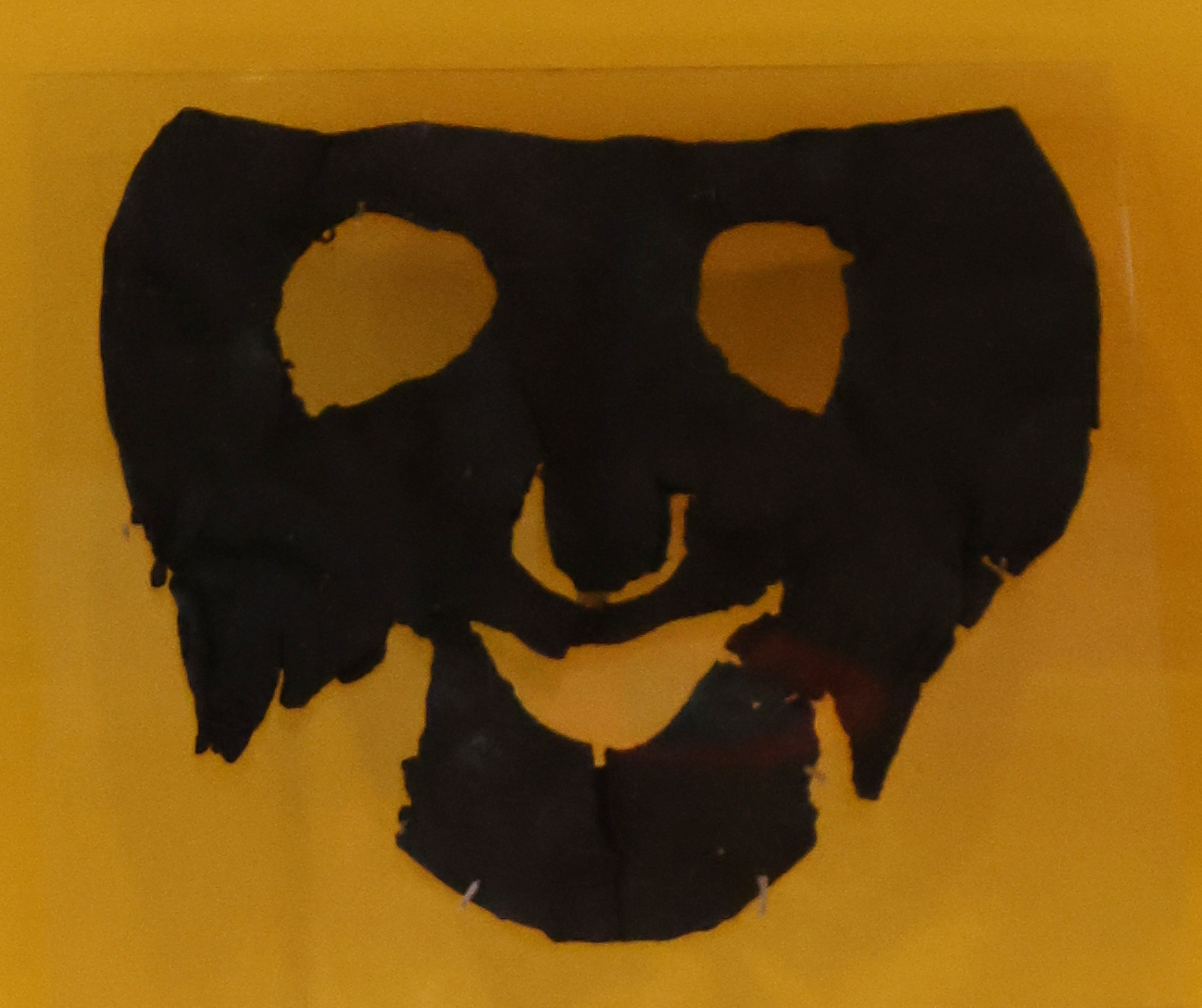
The mask in the Herbert Art Gallery and Museum

A leather mask thought to be a surviving example of those worn by some performers in the Coventry Plays is held in the collections of the Herbert Art Gallery and Museum.
