= The Gift of Christmas =

The Gift of Christmas may refer to:

- The Gift of Christmas (En Vogue album), 2002
- The Gift of Christmas (Juice Newton album), 2007
- "The Gift of Christmas" (song), a 1995 charity single by supergroup Childliners
- Gift of Christmas, a Christmas pageant in the US
