= Coventry Carol =

Christmas carol about the massacre of the innocents

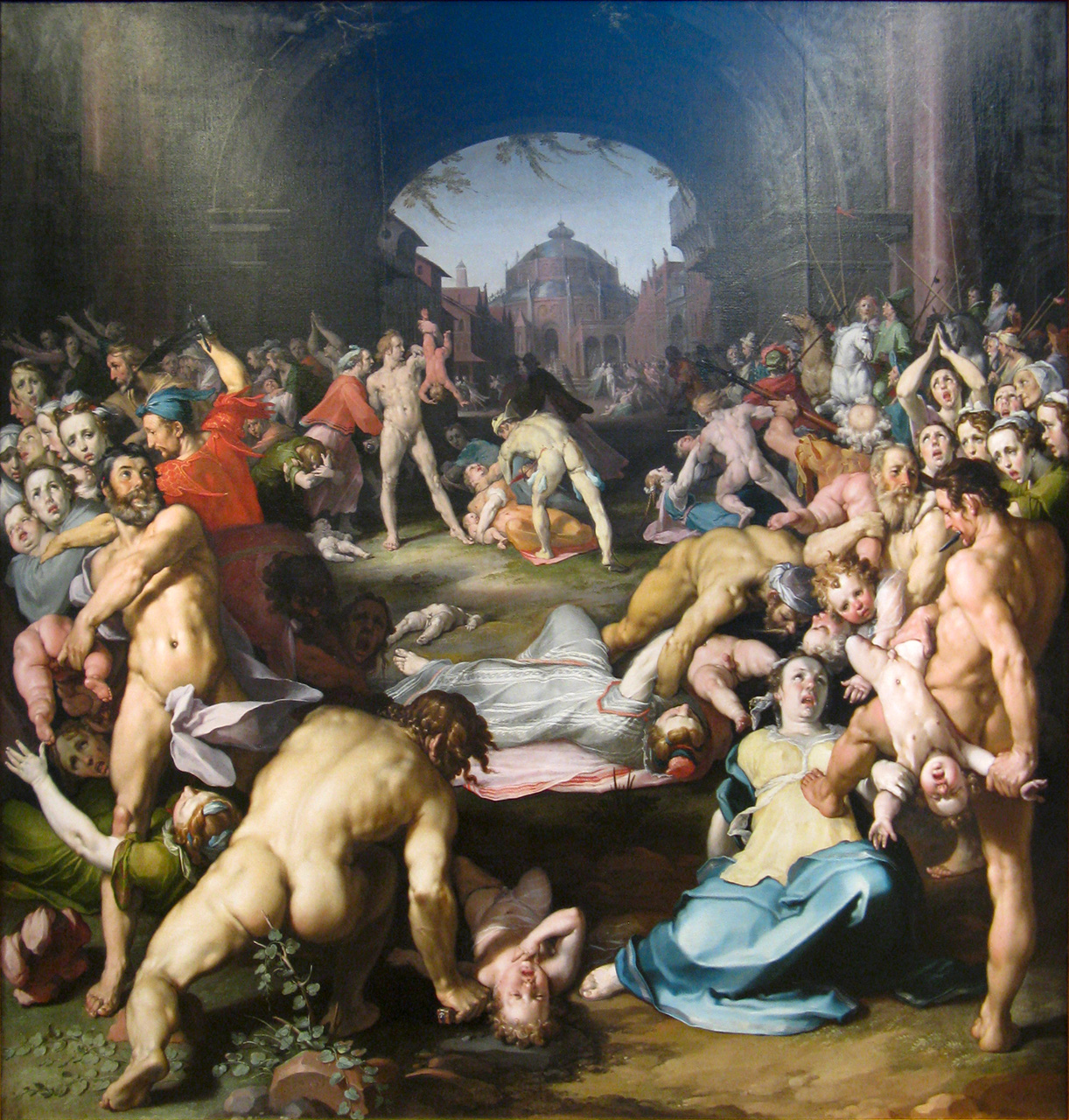
- Massacre of the Innocents, by Cornelis van Haarlem, 1591
- Genre: Christmas music
- Text: Robert Croo (oldest known)
- Language: English

Coventry Carol
Performed by the U.S. Army Band Chorus

Brass choral arrangement
MIDI

The "Coventry Carol" is an English Christmas carol dating from the 16th century. The carol was traditionally performed in Coventry in England as part of a mystery play called The Pageant of the Shearmen and Tailors (1392–3). The play depicts the Christmas story from chapter two in the Gospel of Matthew: the carol itself refers to the Massacre of the Innocents, in which Herod ordered all male infants under the age of two in Bethlehem to be killed, and takes the form of a lullaby sung by the mothers of the doomed children.

The music contains a well-known example of a Picardy third. The author is unknown; the oldest known text was written down by Robert Croo in 1534, and the oldest known setting of the melody dates from 1591. There are alternative, modern settings of the carol by Kenneth Leighton, Philip Stopford and Michael McGlynn.

== History and text ==
The carol is the second of three songs included in the Pageant of the Shearmen and Tailors, a nativity play that was one of the Coventry Mystery Plays, originally performed by the city's guilds.

The exact date of the text is unknown, though there are references to the Coventry guild pageants from 1392 onwards. The single surviving text of the carol and the pageant containing it was edited by one Robert Croo, who dated his manuscript 14 March 1534. Croo, or Crowe, acted for some years as the 'manager' of the city pageants. Over a twenty-year period, payments are recorded to him for playing the part of God in the Drapers' Pageant, for making a hat for a "pharysye", and for mending and making other costumes and props, as well as for supplying new dialogue and for copying out the Shearmen and Tailors' Pageant in a version which Croo described as "newly correcte". Croo seems to have worked by adapting and editing older material, while adding his own verse, “characterized by its ponderously intricate metres”.

Religious changes caused the plays' suppression during the later 16th century, but Croo's prompt book, including the songs, survived, and a transcription was eventually published by the Coventry antiquarian Thomas Sharp in 1817 as part of his detailed study of the city's mystery plays. Sharp published a second edition in 1825, which included the songs' music. Both printings were intended to be a facsimile of Croo's manuscript, copying both the orthography and layout; this proved fortunate as Croo's original 1534 manuscript, which had passed into the collection of the Birmingham Free Library, was destroyed in a fire there in 1879. Sharp's transcriptions are therefore the only source; Sharp had a reputation as a careful scholar, and his copying of the text of the women's carol appears to be accurate.

Within the pageant, the carol is sung by three women of Bethlehem, who enter on stage with their children immediately after Joseph is warned by an angel to take his family to Egypt:

Original spelling	Modernised spelling
Lully, lulla, þᵂ littell tiné child, By by, lully, lullay þᵂ littell tyné child, By by, lully, lullay!	Lully, lullah, thou little tiny child, Bye bye, lully, lullay. Thou little tiny child, Bye bye, lully, lullay.
O sisters too, how may we do For to preserve þⁱˢ day This pore yongling for whom we do singe By by, lully, lullay?	O sisters too, how may we do For to preserve this day This poor youngling for whom we sing, "Bye bye, lully, lullay"?
Herod, the king, in his raging, Chargid he hath this day His men of might in his owne sight All yonge children to slay,—	Herod the king, in his raging, Chargèd he hath this day His men of might in his own sight All young children to slay.
That wo is me, pore child, for thee, And ever morne and say For thi parting nether say nor singe, By by, lully, lullay.	That woe is me, poor child, for thee And ever mourn and may For thy parting neither say nor sing, "Bye bye, lully, lullay."

Sharp's publication of the text stimulated some renewed interest in the pageant and songs, particularly in Coventry itself. Although the Coventry mystery play cycle was traditionally performed in summer, the lullaby has, in modern times, been regarded as a Christmas carol. It was brought to a wider audience after being featured in the BBC's Empire Broadcast at Christmas 1940, shortly after the Bombing of Coventry in World War II, when the broadcast concluded with the singing of the carol in the bombed-out ruins of the Cathedral.

== Music ==
The carol's music was added to Croo's manuscript at a later date by Thomas Mawdyke, his additions being dated 13 May 1591. Mawdyke wrote out the music in three-part harmony, though whether he was responsible for its composition is debatable, and the music's style could be indicative of an earlier date. The three (alto, tenor and baritone) vocal parts confirm that, as was usual with mystery plays, the parts of the "mothers" singing the carol were invariably played by men. The original three-part version contains a "startling" false relation (F♯ in treble, F in tenor) at "by, by".

Mawdyke, who may be identifiable with a tailor of that name living in the St Michael's parish of Coventry in the late 16th century, is thought to have made his additions as part of an unsuccessful attempt to revive the play cycle in the summer of 1591, though in the end the city authorities chose not to support the revival. The surviving pageants were revived in the Cathedral from 1951 onwards.

A four-part setting of the tune by Walford Davies is shown below:

=== "Appalachian" variant ===
A variant of the carol was supposedly collected by folklorist John Jacob Niles in Gatlinburg, Tennessee, in June 1934 (from an "old lady with a gray hat", who according to Niles's notes insisted on remaining anonymous). Niles surmised that the carol had been transplanted from England via the shape note singing tradition, although this version of the carol has not been found elsewhere and there is reason to believe that Niles, a prolific composer, actually wrote it himself. Joel Cohen uncovered an early shape note choral song from the 18th century which also includes some of the lyrics to the Coventry Carol and has a tune at least marginally resembling Niles' variant. For this reason, Cohen argued that the Appalachian variant was likely to be authentic and that Crump et al. had been too quick to assume chicanery on Niles' part due to his proclivity for editing some of his collected material.

Although the tune is quite different from that of the "Coventry Carol", the text is largely similar except for the addition of an extra verse (described by Poston as "regrettable"):

And when the stars ingather do
In their far venture stay
Then smile as dreaming, little one,
By, by, lully, lullay.

A number of subsequent recorded versions have incorporated the fifth verse.

== See also ==
- List of Christmas carols
