= Thomas Sharp (antiquary) =

English antiquarian

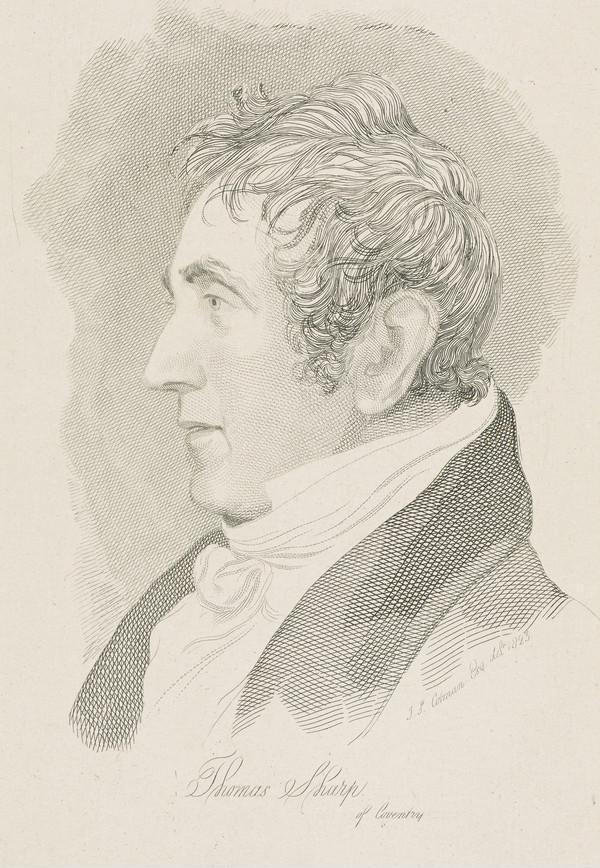
- Sharp by Mary Dawson Turner, after J. S. Cotman
- Born: 7 November 1770; Coventry
- Died: 12 August 1841 (aged 70); Leamington
- Occupation: Antiquarian

Thomas Sharp ( 7 November 1770 – 12 August 1841) was an English antiquarian.

== Biography ==
Sharp was the only son of Thomas Sharp of Coventry, hatter, was born on 7 November 1770, in a house in Smithford Street, Coventry, distinguished by the effigy of ‘Peeping Tom.’ He was educated at the free grammar school, and on his father's death, in 1784, carried on the business.

From youth, Sharp devoted himself to the study of local antiquities. About 1798 Sharp, with two friends, employed a drawing-master to take views of all the buildings of interest in the county, which they caused to be engraved and inserted in their copies of Dugdale's ‘Warwickshire.’ In 1820, Sharp procured rubbings of all the brasses in the county for insertion in the same work. In 1804, he retired from the retail trade, and devoted his additional leisure to antiquarian research. In 1824, appeared his ‘Guide to Coventry,’ and in 1825 he published his chief work, ‘A Dissertation on the Pageants, or Dramatic Mysteries, anciently performed at Coventry by the Trading Companies of that City,’ a treatise of great interest from its bearing on the early history of the stage. The research which it displayed elicited the praise of Sir Walter Scott.

In 1834, Sharp relinquished his business altogether and removed to Leamington, where he was in constant communication with fellow antiquaries, such as Palgrave, Dawson Turner, Francis Douce, William Salt, and John Britton. In his later years, he was an intimate friend and correspondent of William Hamper, for whom he acted as executor. In 1837, he took a principal part in founding the Coventry and Warwick hospital. He died on 12 August 1841 at Leamington, and was interred at St. Michael's burying-ground, Coventry. He married, in 1804, Charlotte Turland of Barnwell, Cambridgeshire, and had nine children, of whom seven survived him.

At the time of his death, Sharp was engaged on a history of Coventry, which appeared posthumously under the title of ‘A Concise History of Coventry.’ A collection of Sharp's papers on the Coventry churches, illustrating the history of the city, was published in 1871, as ‘Coventry Antiquities,’ with a memoir by William George Fretton. Prefixed is a portrait of Sharp etched by Mrs. Dawson Turner, after a drawing made by J. S. Cotman in 1823.

A part from his topographical collections relating to Warwickshire (the majority of which, in manuscript form, were purchased in 1834 by William Staunton of Longbridge House, near Warwick), Sharp was an assiduous collector of coins, and he was an authority on provincial coins and tokens. He drew up a valuable ‘Catalogue of Provincial Copper Coins, Tokens, Tickets, and Medalets’ of the eighteenth and nineteenth centuries, from the collection of Sir George Chetwynd at Grendon Hall; of this sixty copies were printed in quarto in 1834. One of Sharp's coins, a gold half-florin of Edward III, of which only two specimens are known, is now in the British Museum.

Sharp also published: 1. ‘The Pageant of the Company of Sheremen and Tailors in Coventry,’ 1817, 4to. 2. ‘An Account of the Fraternity of the Grey Friars in Coventry,’ 1818, 4to. 3. ‘History of Bablake Church, Coventry,’ 1818, 4to. 4. ‘Illustrations of the History of the Church of the Holy Trinity, Coventry,’ 1818, 4to. 5. ‘Illustrations of the History of St. Michael's Church, Coventry,’ 1818, 4to. 6. ‘Kenilworth Illustrated,’ 1821, 4to. 7. ‘Ancient Mysteries and Moralities,’ edited from the Digby MSS., 1835, 4to. 8. ‘An Epitome of the County of Warwickshire,’ London, 1835, 4to.
