= William Dugdale =

English antiquary and herald (1605–1686)

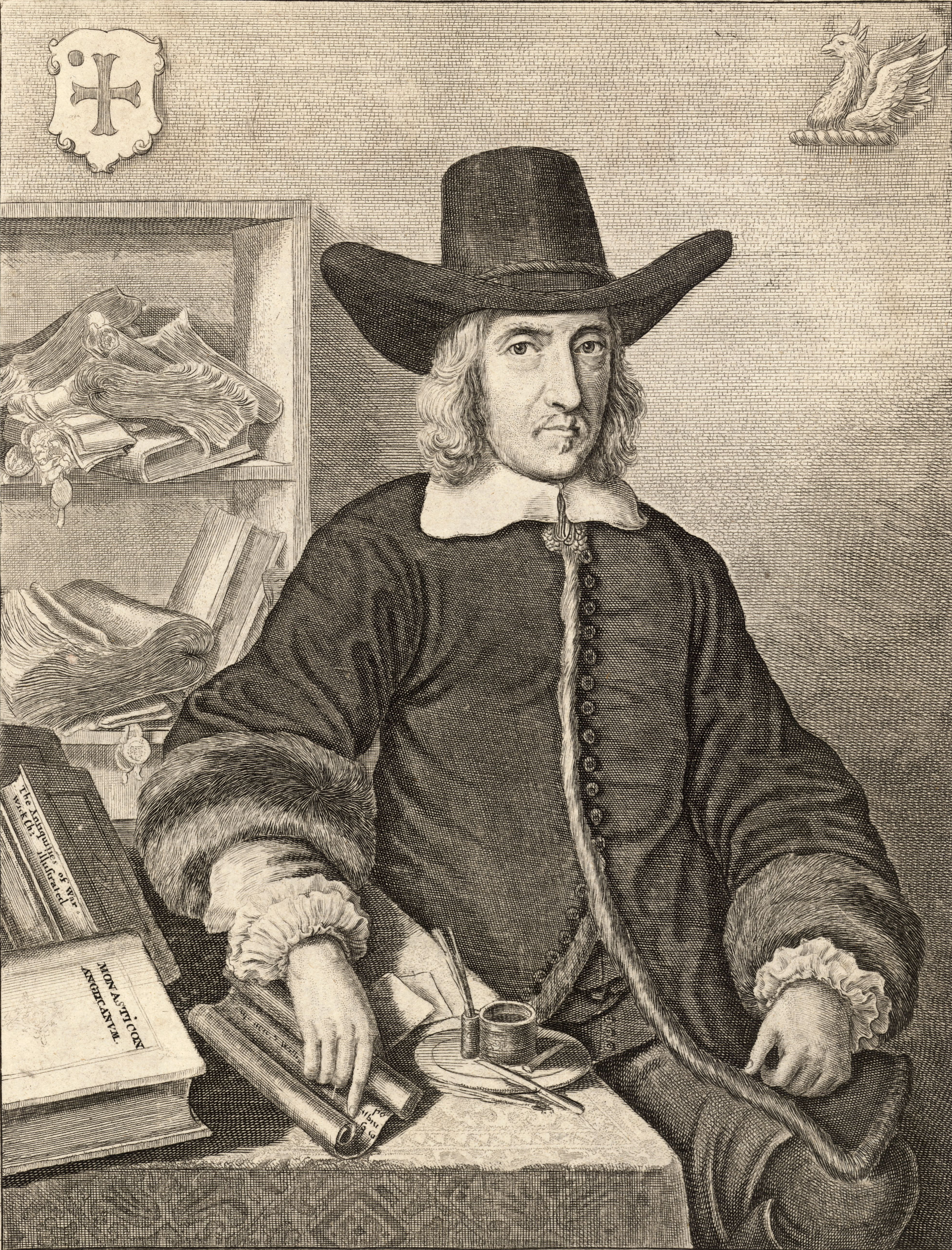
Sir William Dugdale of Blyth Hall in 1656: an etching by Wenceslaus Hollar

Sir William Dugdale (12 September 1605 – 10 February 1686) was an English antiquary and herald. As a scholar he was influential in the development of medieval history as an academic subject.

== Life ==
Dugdale was born at Shustoke, near Coleshill in Warwickshire, where his father, John Dugdale, was steward to the local landowner. As he was born, a swarm of bees flew into the garden, which some considered "a happy presage on the life of the babe".

Dugdale was educated at King Henry VIII School, Coventry. In 1623, he married Margaret Huntbach (1607–81), with whom he had nineteen children. In 1625, the year after his father's death, he purchased the manor of Blyth, near Shustoke. During an enclosure dispute with a neighbour a few years later he met the Leicestershire antiquary William Burton, who acted as arbitrator. He became involved in transcribing documents and collecting church notes and met other Midlands antiquaries such as Sir Simon Archer (1581–1662) and Sir Thomas Habington. He began working with Archer on the history of Warwickshire and their research led them to the archives of public records in London. There he met Sir Christopher Hatton, Sir Henry Spelman, Sir Simonds d'Ewes and Sir Edward Dering. Hatton provided him with hospitality in Holborn and became his principal patron.

In 1638, through the influence of his friends Dugdale was created a pursuivant of arms extraordinary by the name of Blanche Lyon, and, in 1639, he was promoted to the office of Rouge Croix Pursuivant of Arms in Ordinary. The accommodation in the College of Arms and the income from his post enabled him to pursue his research in London.

According to his later account, in 1641 Christopher Hatton, foreseeing the English Civil War and dreading the ruin and spoliation of the Church, commissioned him to make exact drafts of all the monuments in Westminster Abbey and the principal churches in England.

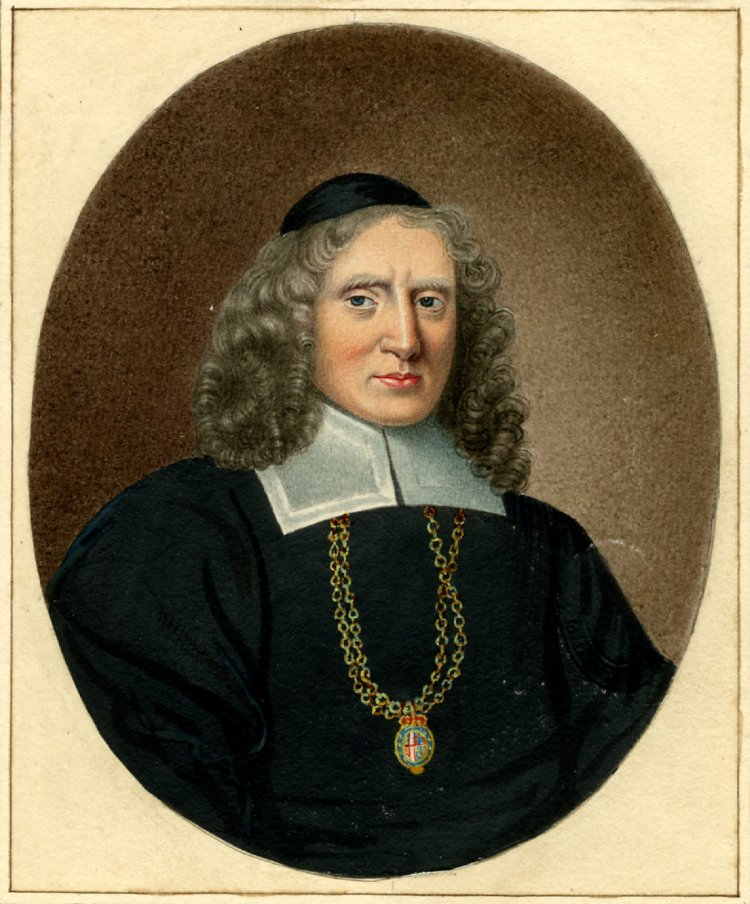
Posthumous portrait of Dugdale by Silvester Harding

In June 1642, he was summoned with the other heralds to attend the king at York. When the war broke out Charles deputed him to summon the castles of Banbury and Warwick to surrender.

Dugdale witnessed the Battle of Edgehill, and later returned with a surveyor to make a survey of the battlefield. He arrived in Oxford with the king in November 1642 and he was admitted MA of the University. He worked as a bureaucrat in the royalist capital, especially after December 1643 when Hatton was appointed Comptroller of the Household. In 1644 the king appointed him Chester Herald of Arms in Ordinary.

During his leisure at Oxford, Dugdale collected material at the Bodleian Library and college libraries for his books. It was during these years that he met Elias Ashmole, who later became his son-in-law. Following the surrender of Oxford in 1646 Dugdale returned to Blyth Hall and compounded for his estates under the terms of the Oxford articles. Hatton, who had opposed the surrender, went into exile in France, where Dugdale visited him in 1648.

Dugdale recommenced his antiquarian researches, collaborating with Roger Dodsworth on the Monasticon Anglicanum, the first volume of which was published in 1655. In the following year he published his own Antiquities of Warwickshire, which was soon recognised as a model county history. In this work he was one of the first to consider the significance of stone tools, stating these were "weapons used by the Britons before the art of making arms of brass or iron was known".

At the Restoration, Dugdale obtained the office of Norroy King of Arms through the influence of the Earl of Clarendon. In the office of Norroy he undertook heraldic visitations of the counties north of the Trent.

In 1677, Dugdale was knighted and promoted to the office of Garter Principal King of Arms, which he held until his death. In his last years he wrote an account of his life at the request of Anthony Wood. He died "in his chair" at Blyth Hall in Warwickshire in 1686, aged 80. His house is still occupied by his descendants.

== Works ==
- Monasticon Anglicanum (1655–1673); As can be read on the title page, the original was written in Latin and the work linked to here is the version translated into English and abridged by James Wright. This version was published in 1693.
- Antiquities of Warwickshire (1656)
- History of St Paul's Cathedral (1658)
- The History of Imbanking and Drayning (1662)
- Origines Juridiciales (1666)
- Baronage of England (1675–1676)
- A Short View of the Late Troubles (1681)
- Ancient Usage of Bearing Arms (1682)
- Visitations of Derbyshire, Yorkshire, etc.

Dugdale also edited Sir Henry Spelman's Glossarium Archaiologicum (1664) and Concilia (1664), adding his own extensions to the latter. His Life, written by himself up to 1678, with his diary and correspondence, and an index to his manuscript collections, was edited by William Hamper, and published in 1827.

== Arms ==
Coat of arms of William Dugdale
Crest A griffin's head & wings or. Escutcheon Argent, a millrind cross (Cross moline) gules with a roundel gules in the dexter canton. Motto Pestis Patriae Pigrities ("Sloth is the bane of a country")

== Legacy ==
The Dugdale Society, a text publication society for Warwickshire, takes its name from William Dugdale.

== See also ==
- College of Arms

== Sources ==
- Broadway, Jan (1999). William Dugdale and the Significance of County History in Early Stuart England. Dugdale Society Occasional Papers. Vol. 39. Stratford-upon-Avon: Dugdale Society.
- Broadway, Jan (2011). William Dugdale: a life of the Warwickshire historian and herald. Gloucester: Xmera. ISBN 9780956742803.
- Dyer, Christopher; Richardson, Catherine, eds. (2009). William Dugdale, Historian, 1605–1686: his life, his writings and his county. Woodbridge: Boydell. ISBN 9781843834434.
- Hamper, William (1827). The Life, Diary, and Correspondence of Sir William Dugdale, Knight. London: Harding, Leppard, and Co.
- Maddison, Francis; Styles, Dorothy; Wood, Anthony (1953). Sir William Dugdale, 1605–1686: a list of his printed works and of his portraits, with notes on his life and the manuscript sources. Warwick: L. E. Stephens.
- Parry, Graham (2009) [2004]. "Dugdale, Sir William (1605–1686)". Oxford Dictionary of National Biography (online ed.). Oxford University Press. doi:10.1093/ref:odnb/8186. (Subscription, Wikipedia Library access or UK public library membership required.)
- Scroggs, E. S. (1937). "Sir William Dugdale, 1605–86". Journal of the British Archaeological Association. 3rd ser. 2 (1): 1–16. doi:10.1080/00681288.1937.11894351.

Heraldic offices
Preceded by Henry Lilly	Rouge Croix Pursuivant of Arms; 1639–1644	Succeeded by Henry Dethick
Preceded by Edward Walker	Chester Herald of Arms; 1644–1660	Succeeded by Thomas Lee
Preceded by George Owen	Norroy King of Arms; 1660–1677	Succeeded by Sir Henry St George
Preceded by Edward Walker	Garter King of Arms; 1677–1686	Succeeded by Sir Thomas St George
