= Nativity play =

Christmas-based theatrical genre

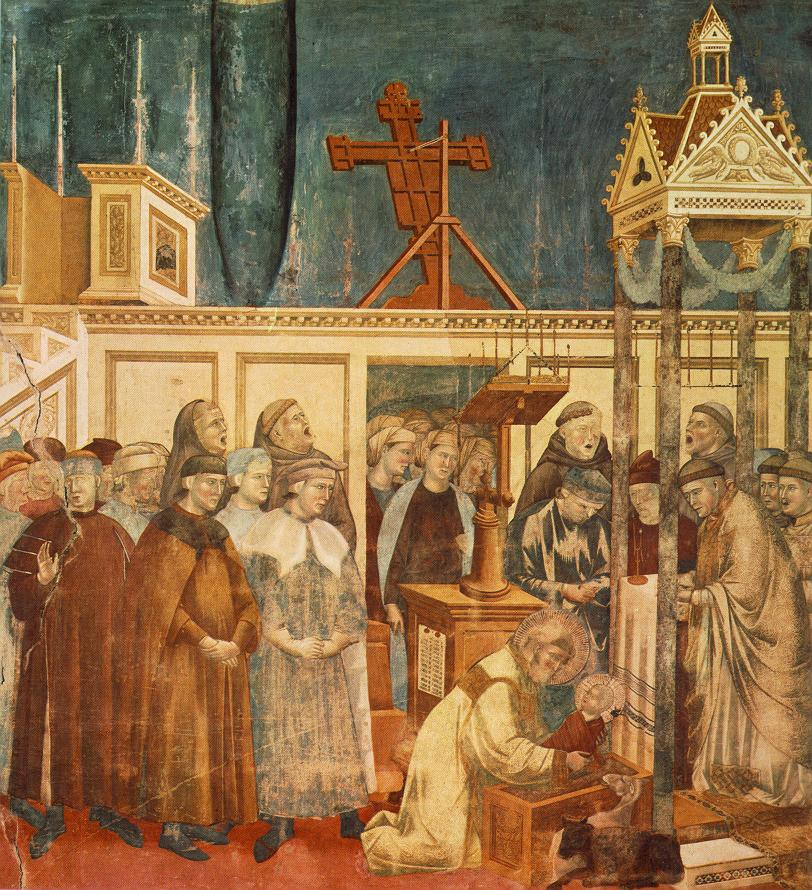
St. Francis at Greccio by Giotto, 1295

A Nativity play or Christmas pageant is a play which recounts the story of the Nativity of Jesus. It is usually performed at Christmas, the feast of the Nativity. For the Christian celebration of Christmas, the viewing of the Nativity play is one of the oldest Christmastime traditions, with the first reenactment of the Nativity of Jesus taking place in A.D. 1223 in the Italian town of Greccio.

== Liturgical ==
The term "Nativity Drama" is used by Wellesz in his discussion of the troparion hymns in the Christmas liturgy of Byzantine Rite Churches, from Sophronius in the seventh century. Goldstein argues that the label "drama" is misleading, that the troparia are more akin to an oratorio than a play, and that the form is not a precursor of later more decidedly dramatic forms.

Saint Francis of Assisi performed Midnight Mass in the Italian town of Greccio on Christmas Eve 1223 in front of a life-size nativity scene (crib or creche) built by Giovanni Velita, with live animals. This is the first Nativity play. However, more formal Nativity plays have featured in Christian worship since medieval mystery plays.

The 12th to 19th pageants of the 48-play York Mystery Cycle showcase the Nativity stories. However, the most famous Nativity play is from the medieval Wakefield Cycle The Second Shepherds' Play.

In modern Germany, the Weihnachten services on Christmas Eve include a children's mass called Weihnachtsgeschichte, which features a Krippenspiel ('crib play').

The German tradition also includes the Erlau Playbook and the plays from Oberufer.

== Popular ==
In Latin America pastorelas ('shepherd's plays') are performed in many local communities. These were imported during Spanish colonization of the Americas. They recount the story of the shepherds travelling to worship the newborn Christ, augmenting the Biblical text with apocryphal events, indigenous beliefs, regional features, anachronisms, satire and buffoonery. Each community's play evolves into a distinctive tradition.

In Spain, such plays are less common today, with notable exceptions in Catalonia, where they persist in two principal forms. Pastorets are indoor theatrical performances, typically presenting the Nativity story from the perspective of the shepherds and recounting their journey to visit the Holy Family. Pessebres vivents (“living nativity scenes”) are outdoor productions consisting of a series of tableaux or enacted scenes representing episodes from the Nativity narrative; depending on the locality, participants may remain static or perform scripted actions.

In Belgium, puppet theatres often put on variations on the Nativity play in the weeks before Christmas, with parents and their children in the audience. The play often depicts the Massacre of the Innocents which occurred after the birth of Jesus. Joan Gross traces this augmentation back to cryptic protests in the late nineteenth century against the abuse of native peoples by colonists in the King Leopold II's Congo Free State.

In Townsville, Queensland Australia, the Stable on the Strand is an annual nativity play held at the city's oceanfront park.

Nativity plays are also popular in the United States. Many larger congregations have an annual play which is popular in the community: one example is the Gift of Christmas, produced annually by Prestonwood Baptist Church at its main campus in Plano, Texas.

It is also very popular in Eastern Europe, notably in Ukraine, Poland and Hungary.

== In schools ==
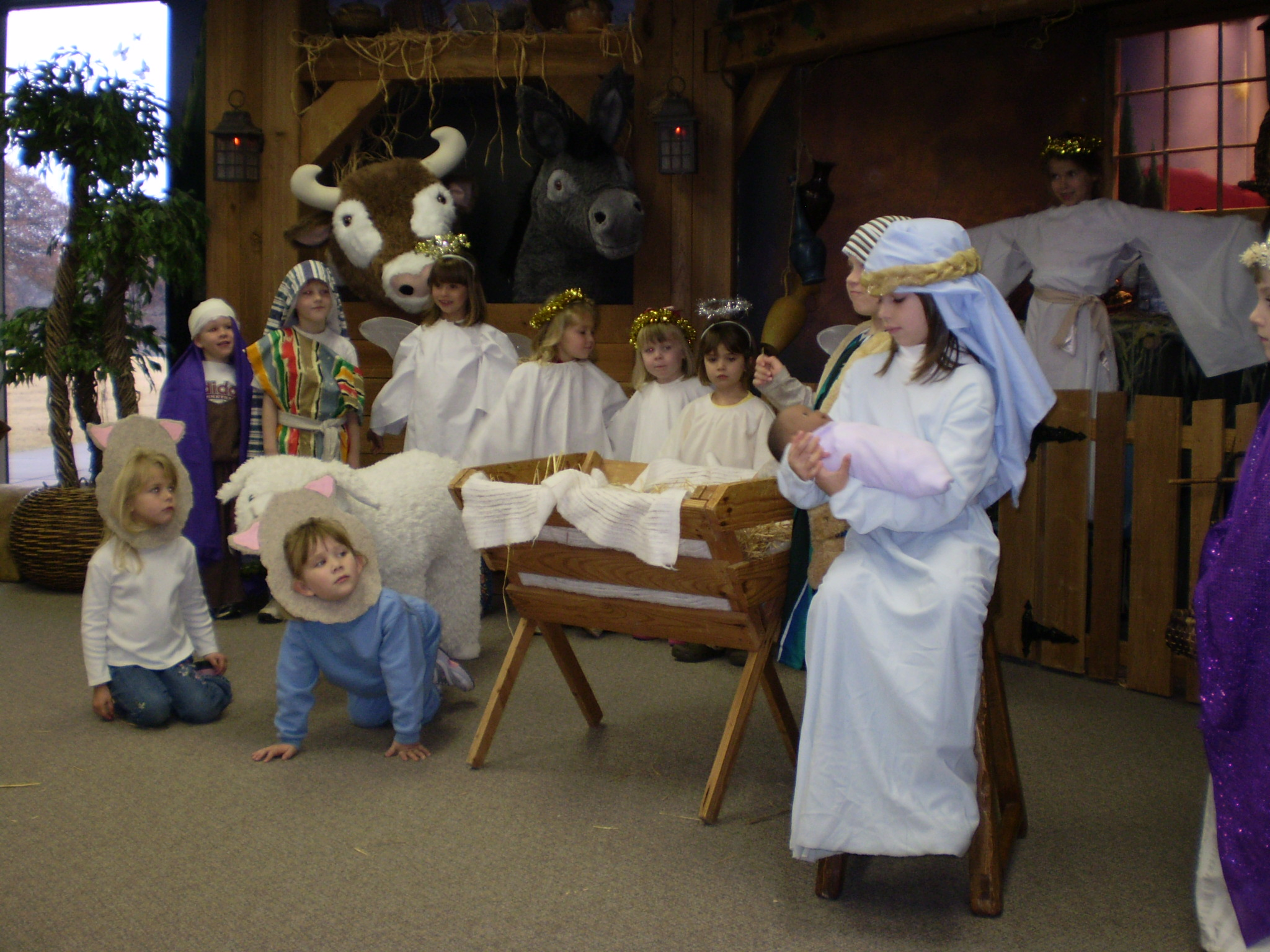
A children's nativity play in Oklahoma.

Many, especially Christian-oriented, primary schools and Sunday Schools put on a Nativity play before the Christmas break begins. Children in costume act as the human and angel characters, and often as the animals and props. The infant Jesus is sometimes represented by a doll, but sometimes played by a real baby. Parents, grandparents and siblings, schoolteachers and sometimes the church community in general form the audience. The tradition of Nativity plays in British state primary schools is declining in favour of secular plays because of the need to include pupils of other faiths. However, a survey in 2012 found that 20% of schools were planning a traditional Nativity play and a further 50% were intending to stage an updated version of the Christmas story, sometimes with new music and extra characters.

== Traditional Characters in the Ukrainian Nativity Play (Vertep) ==
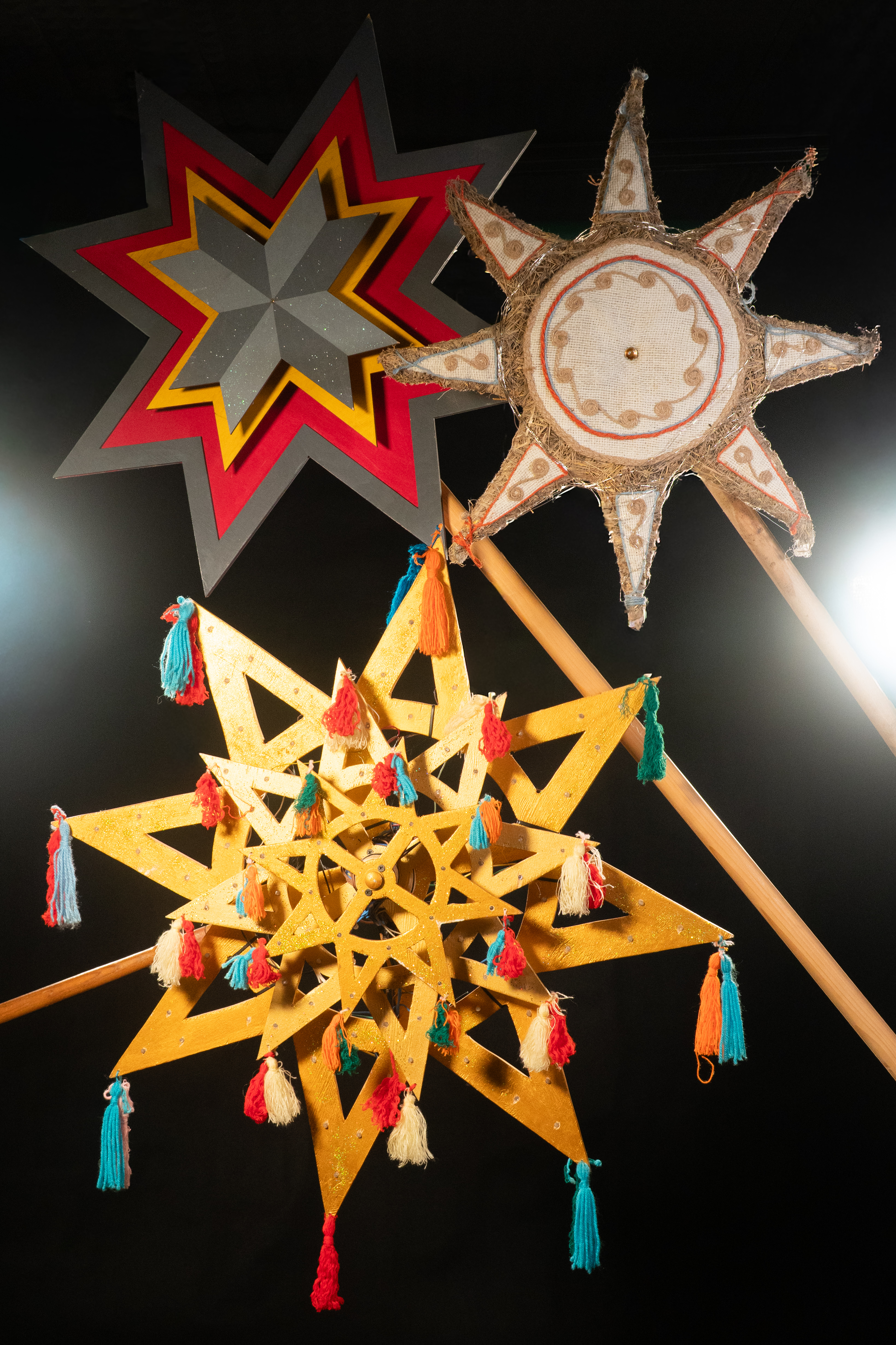
Traditional Vertep Stars

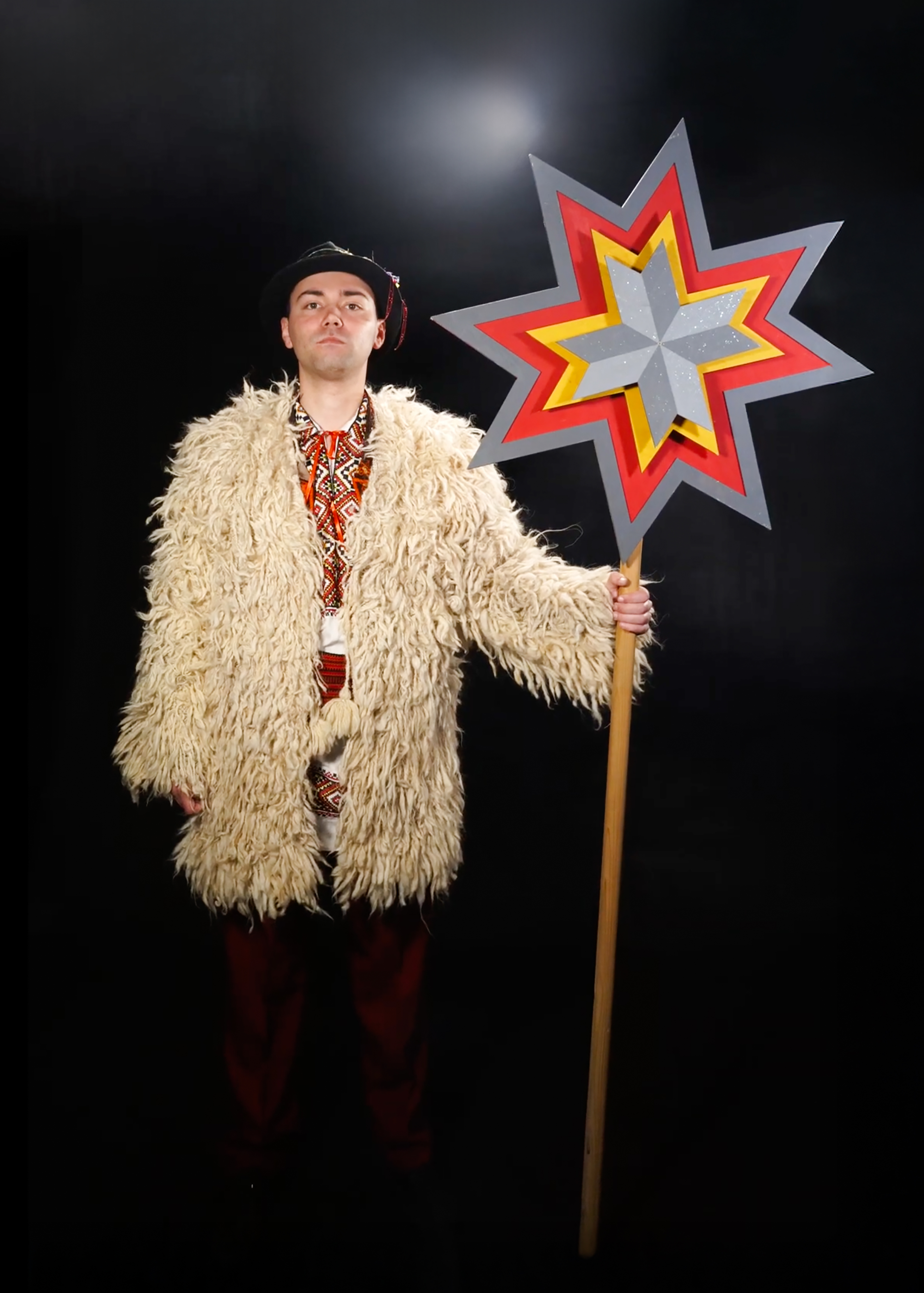
Zvizdar (Star-bearer)

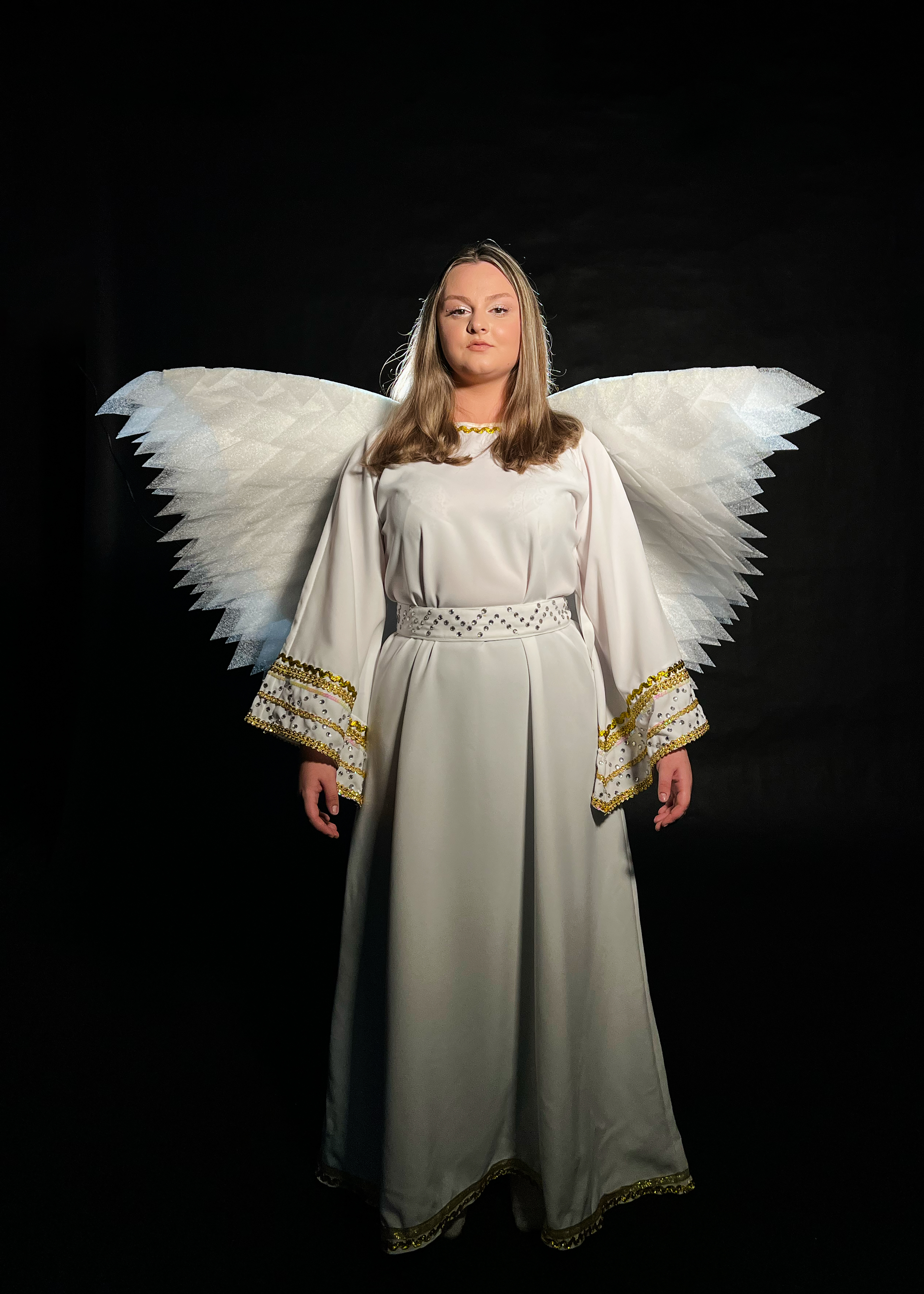
Angel

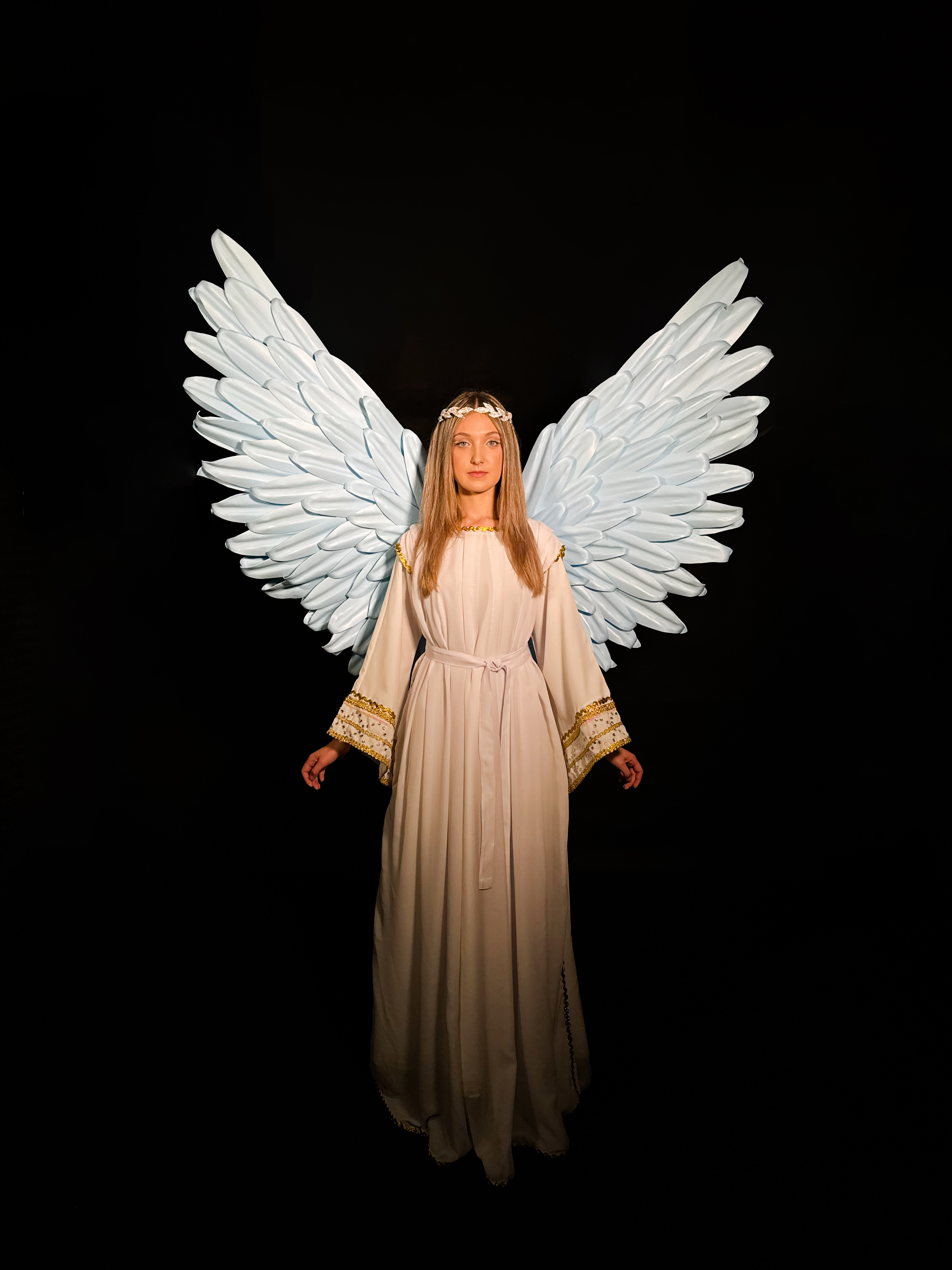
Angel of Peace

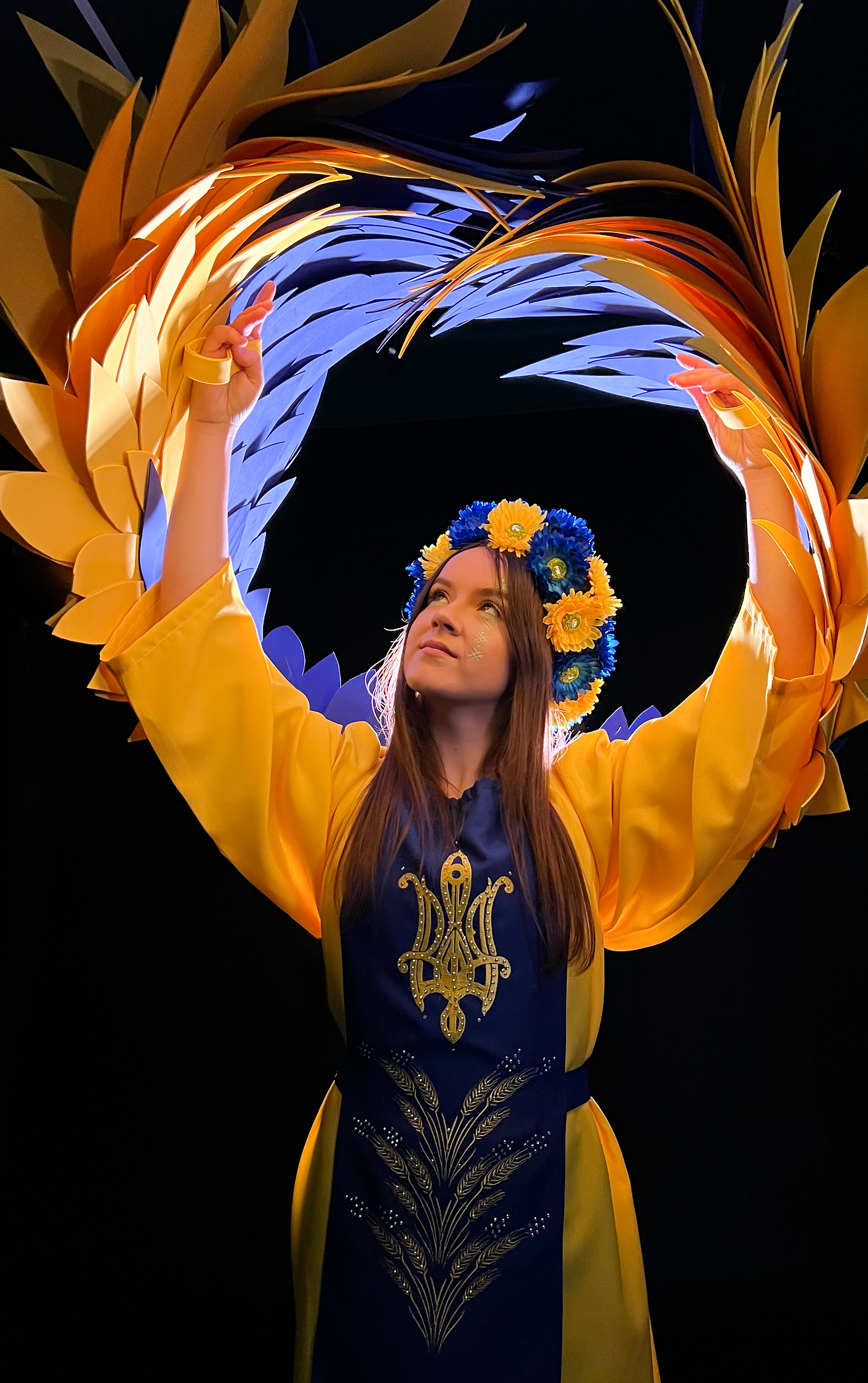
Angel of Ukraine

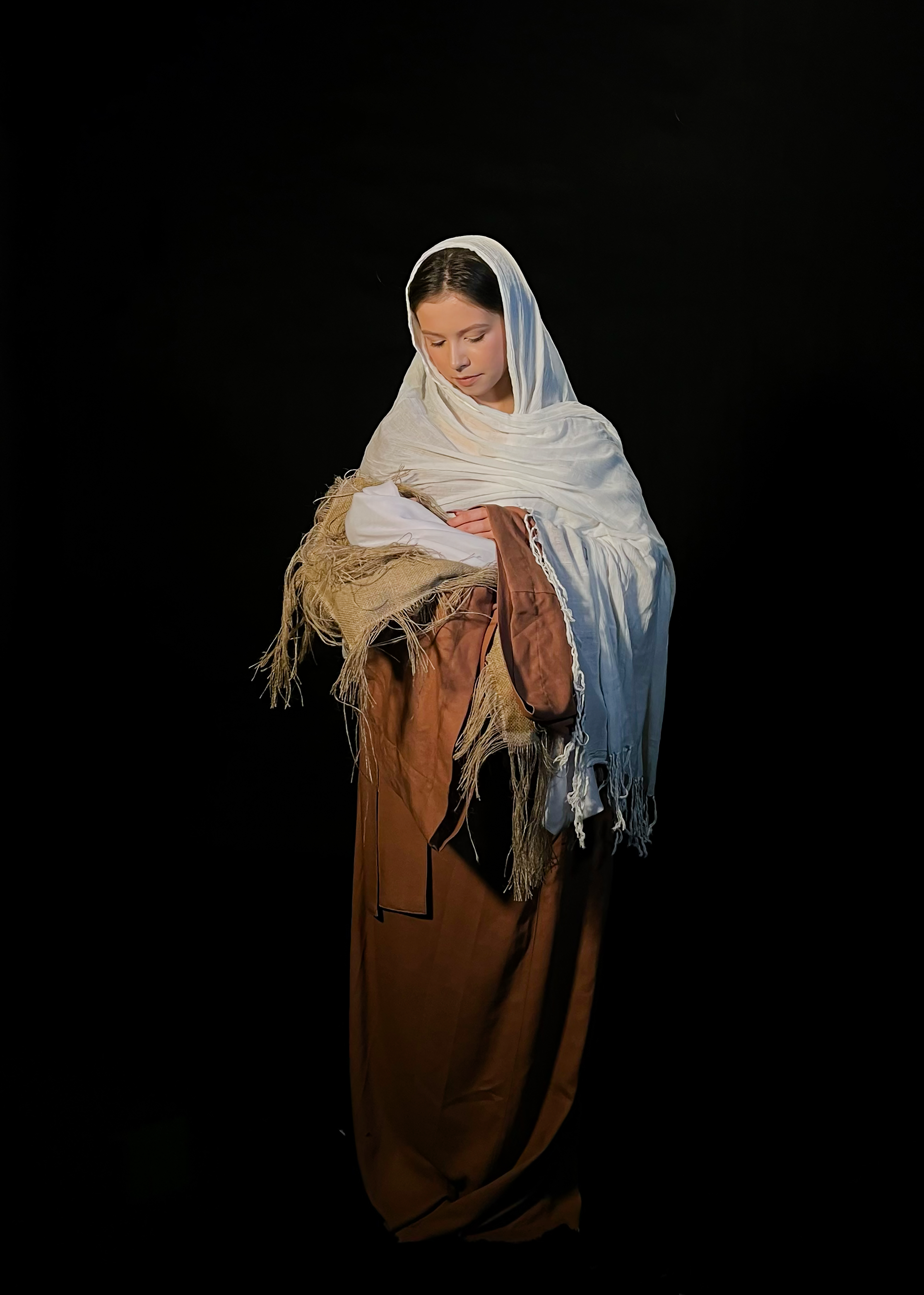
The Virgin Mary

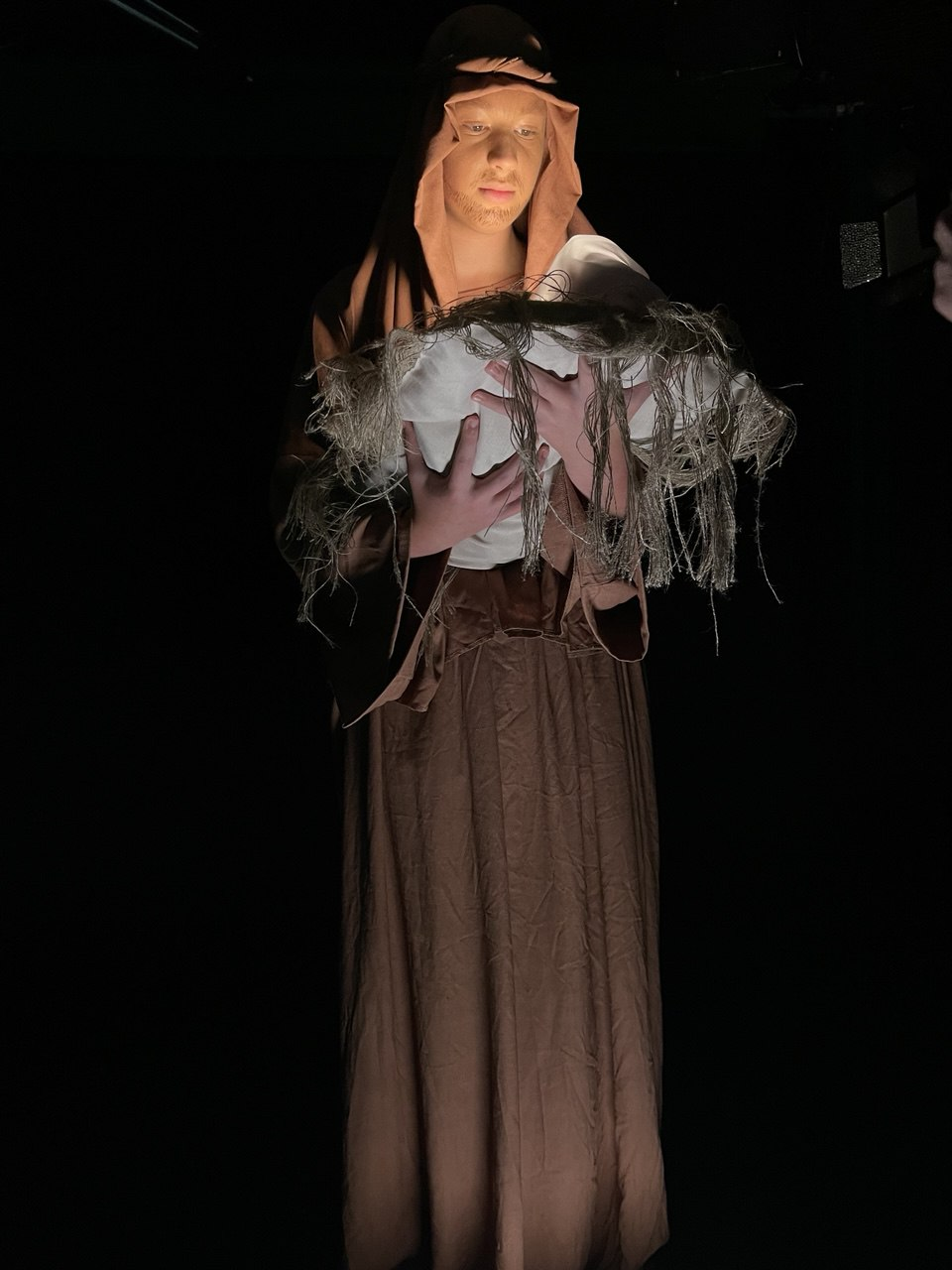
Saint Joseph

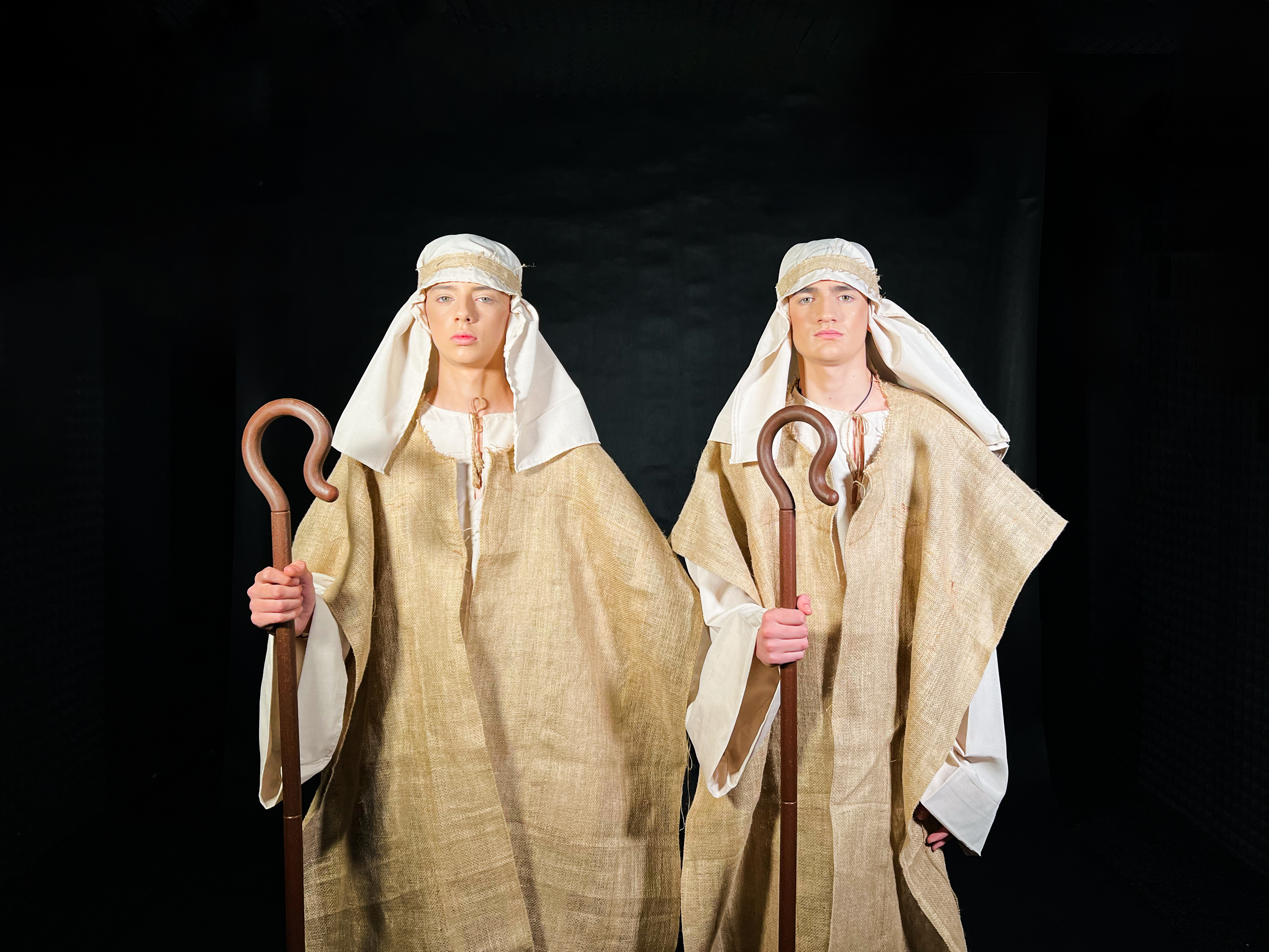
Biblical Shepherds

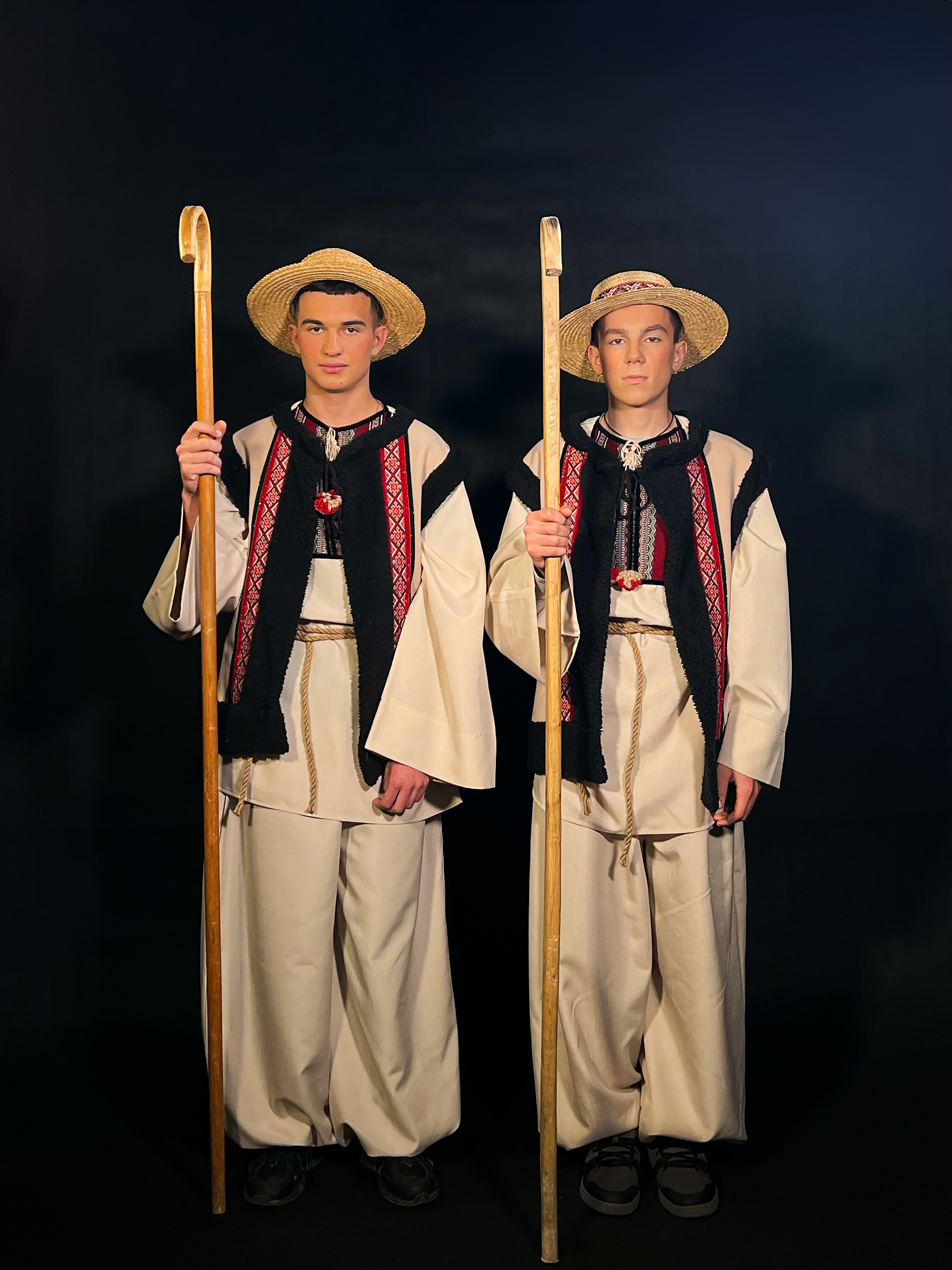
Traditional Ukrainian Shepherds

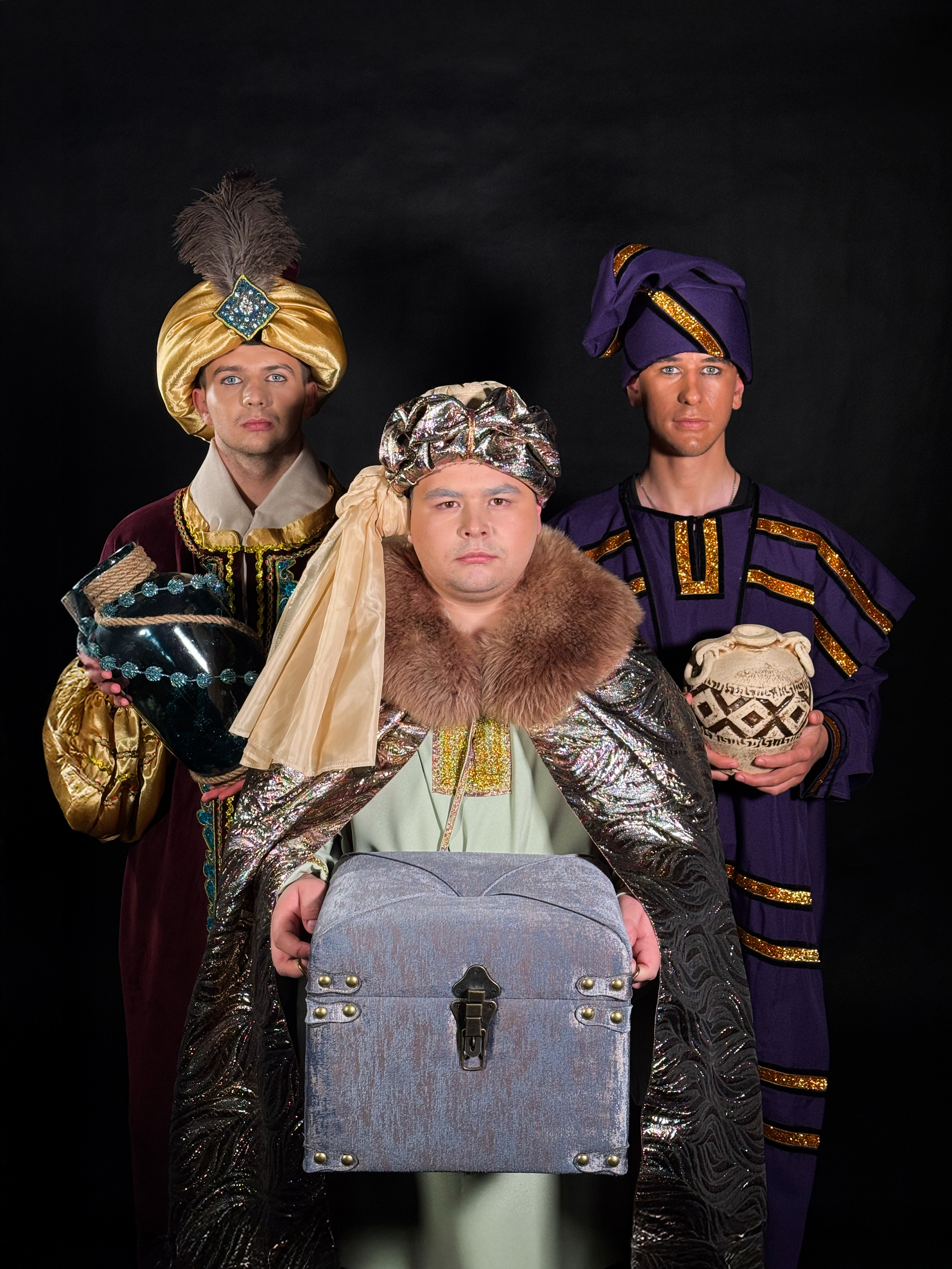
Three Kings

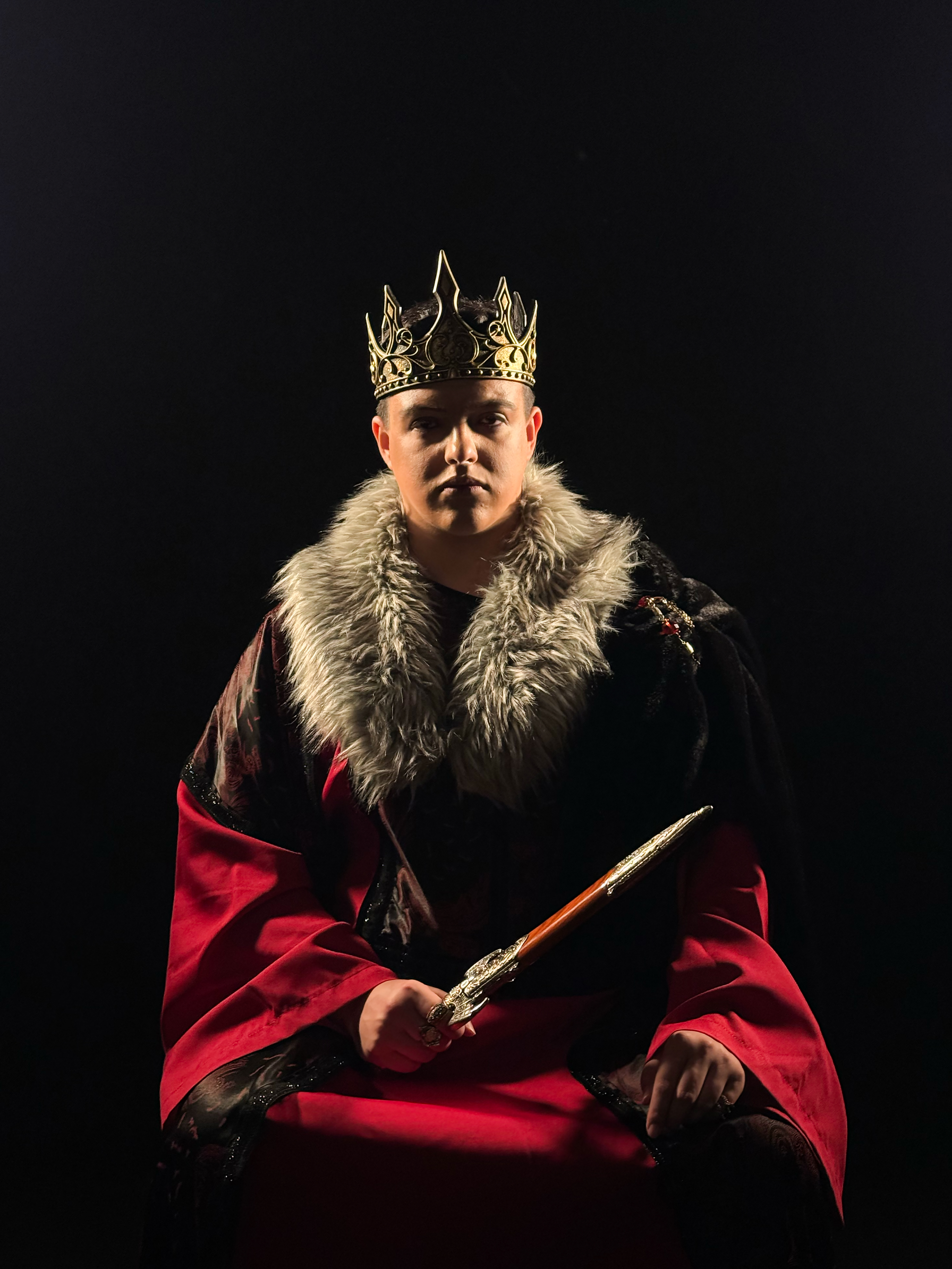
King Herod

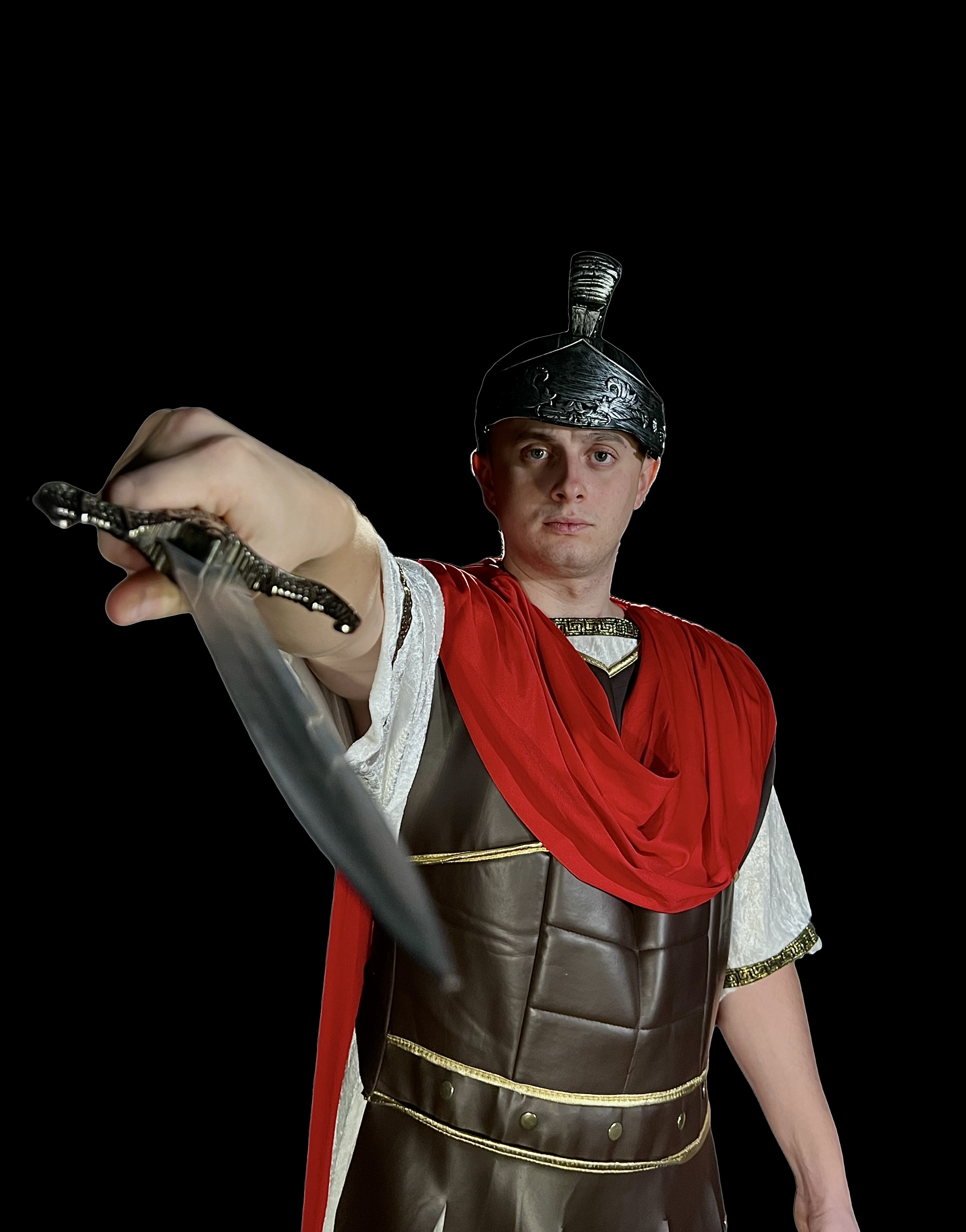
Soldier of King Herod

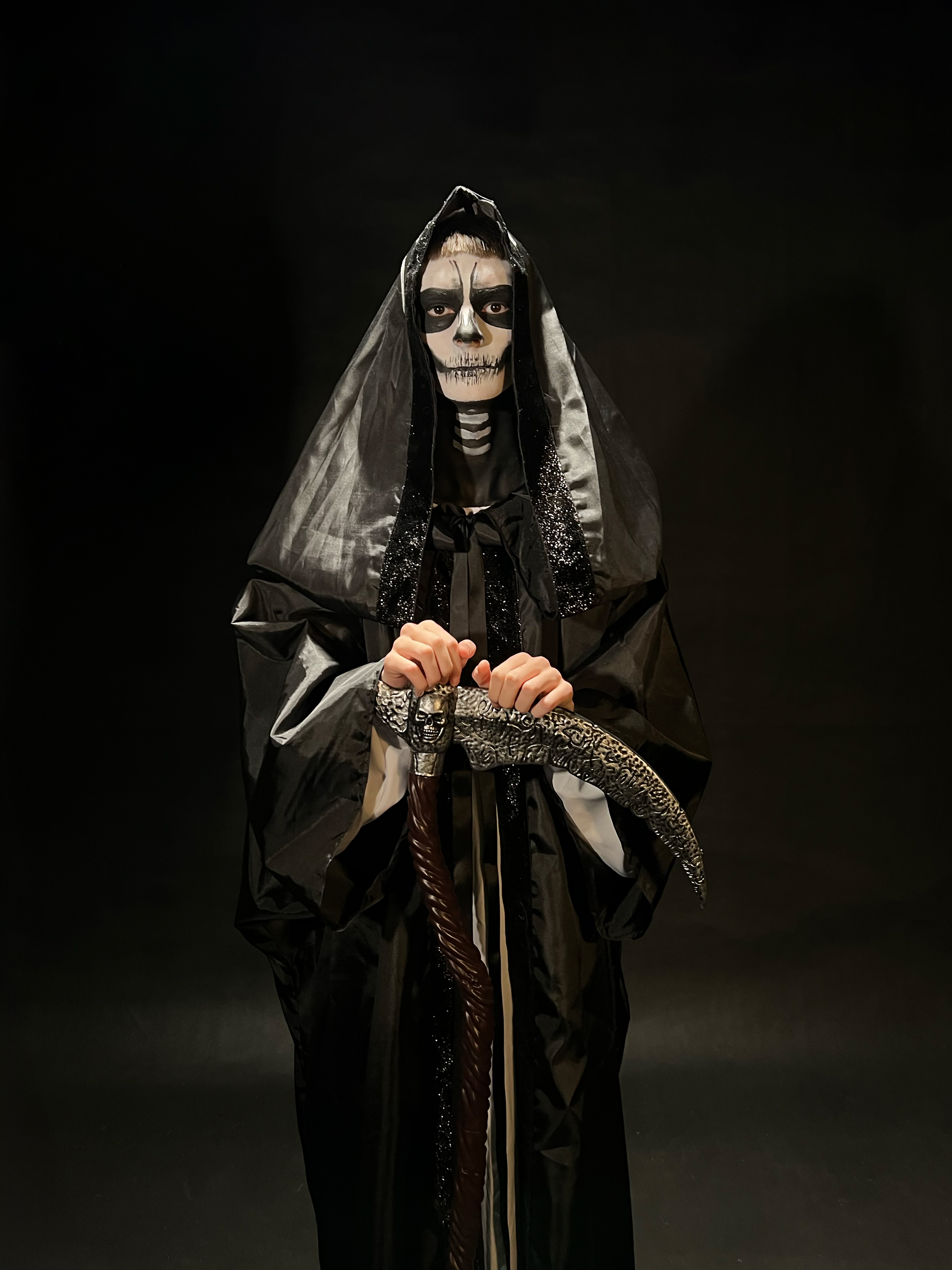
Death

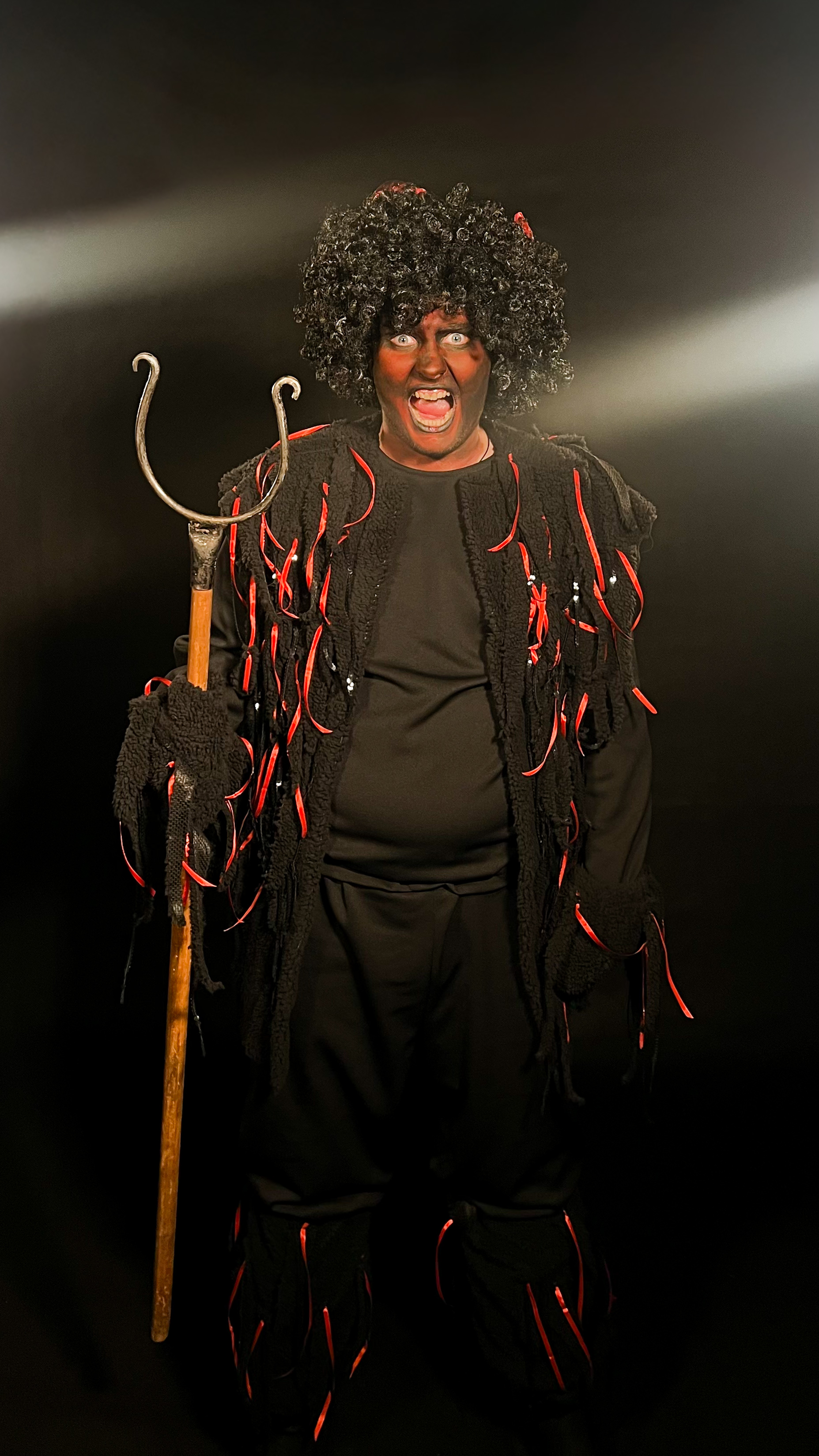
The Devil

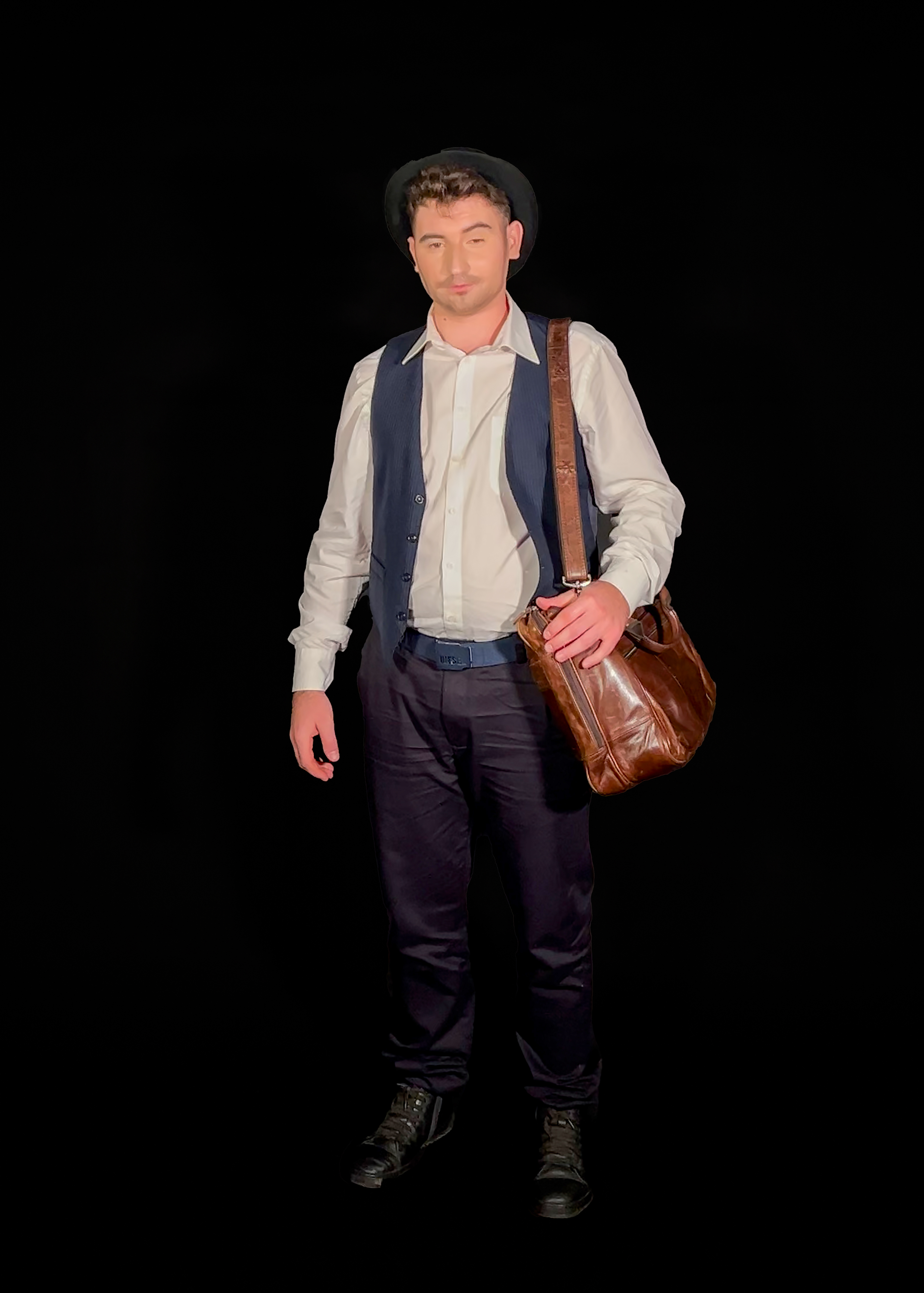
Moshko

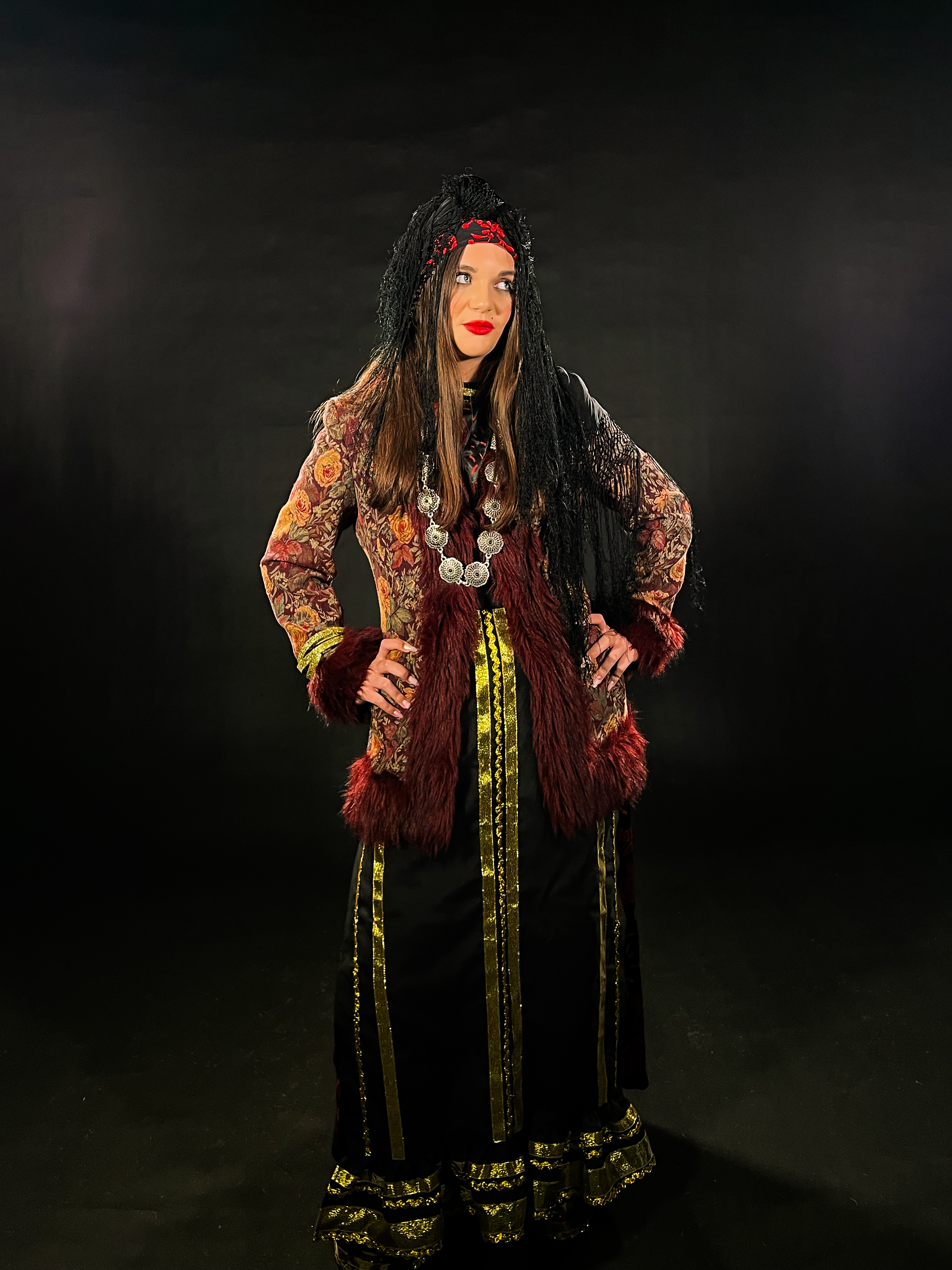
Sura

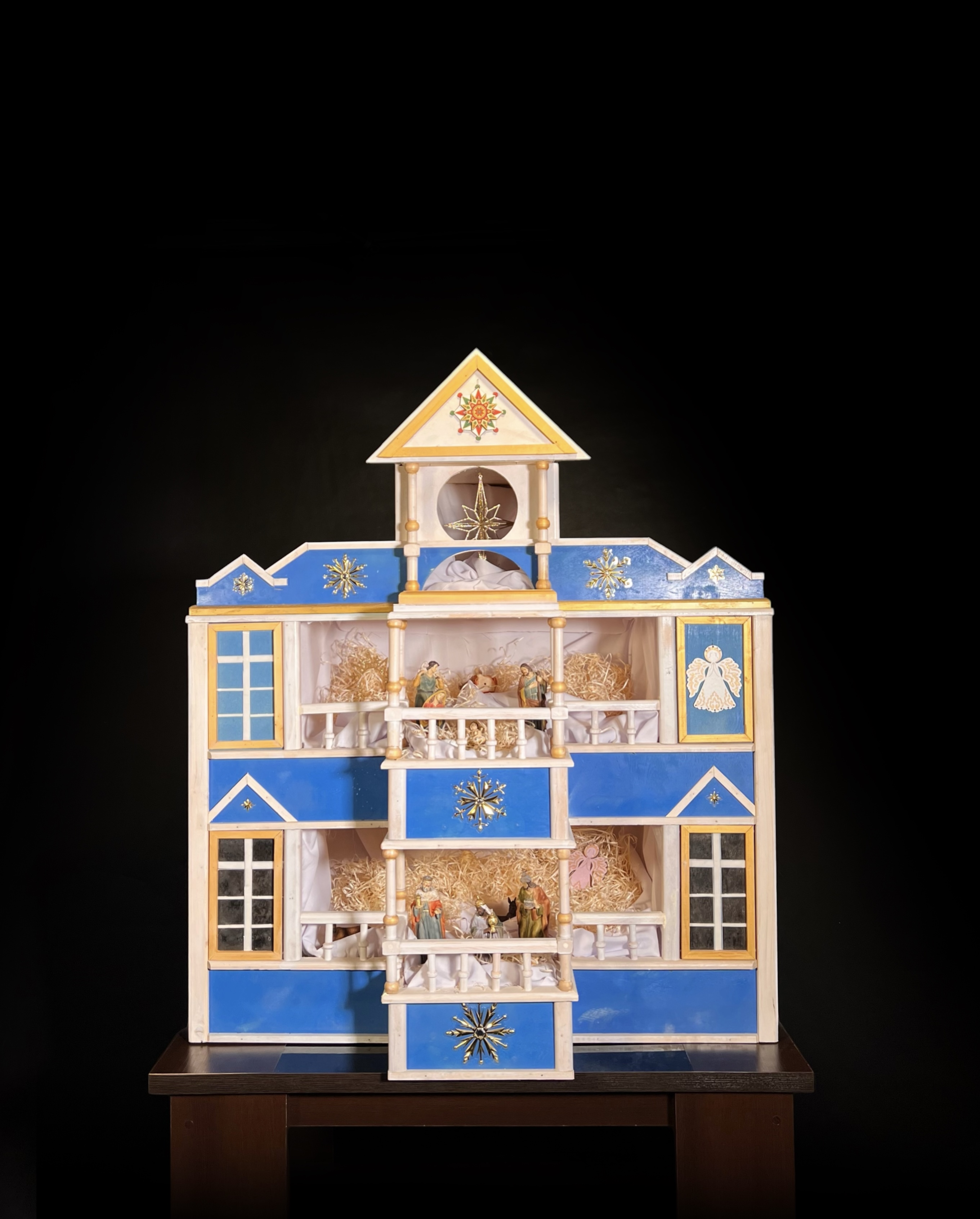
Portable Ukrainian Nativity Scene

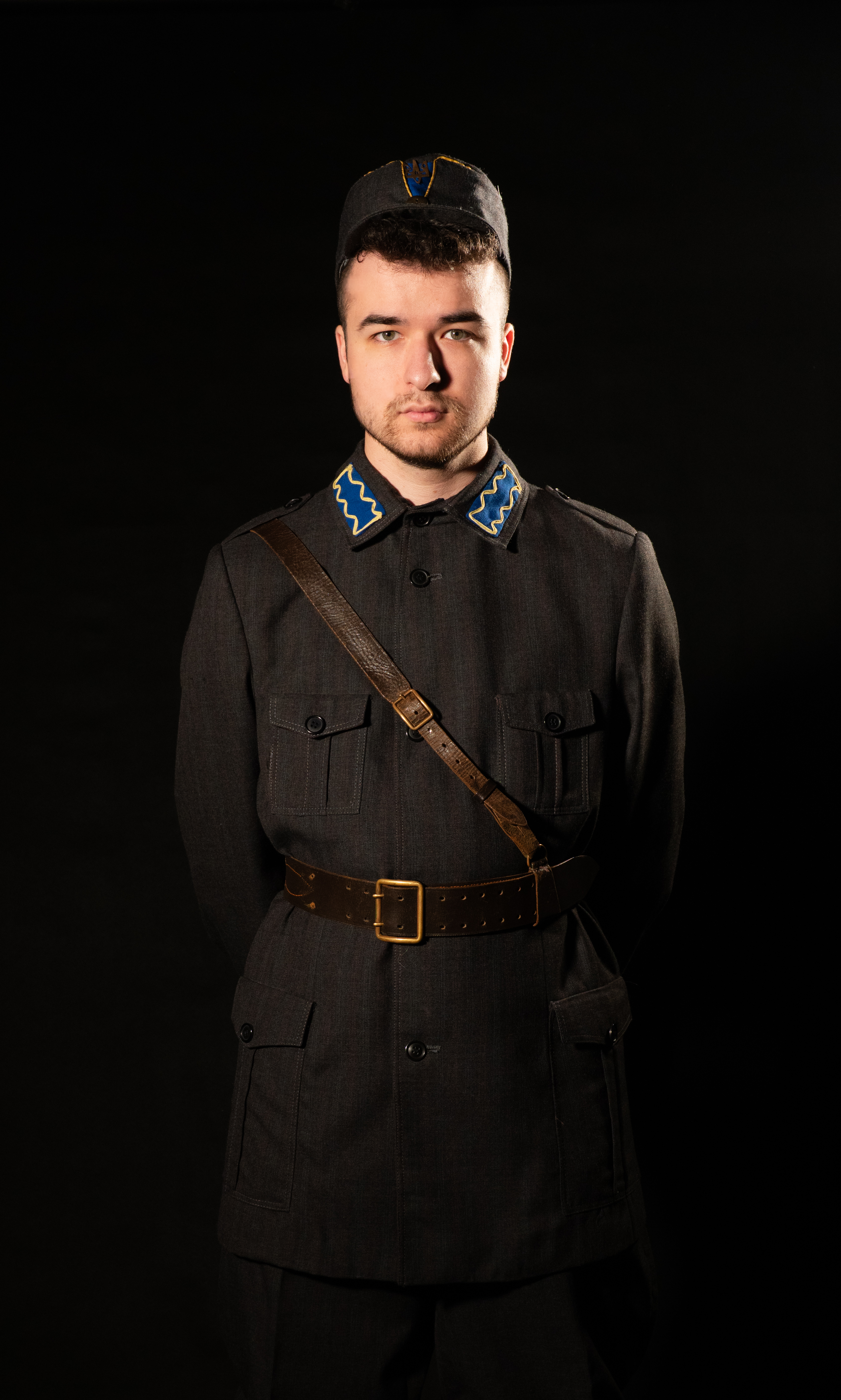
Soldier of the Ukrainian Insurgent Army (UPA)

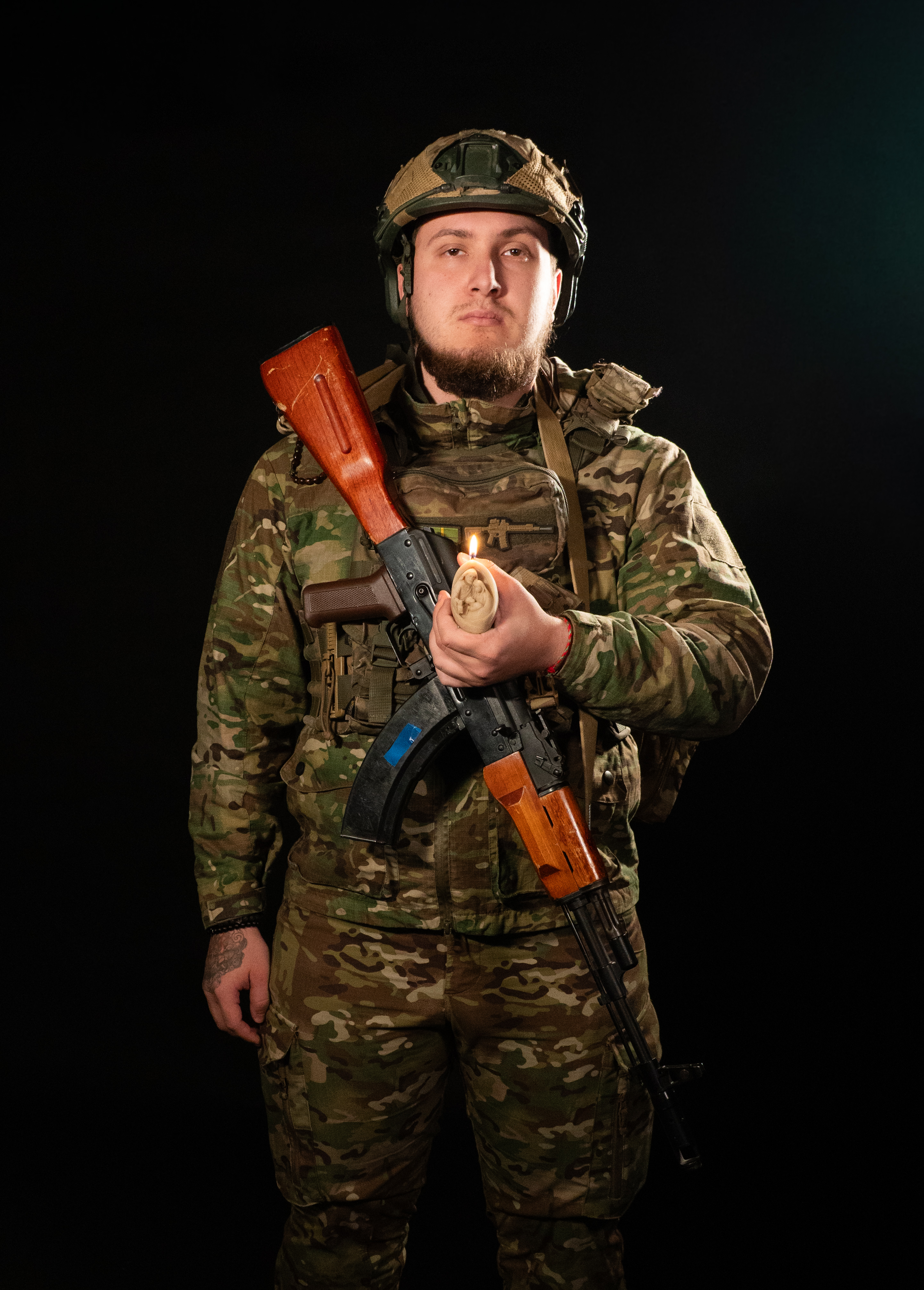
Soldier of the Armed Forces of Ukraine

== Literary ==
Modern writers to have written Nativity plays include Laurence Housman (Bethlehem, 1902; musical accompaniment by Joseph Moorat c. 1919); Lucjan Rydel (Polish Bethlehem, 1904); Cicely Hamilton (The Child in Flanders: A Nativity Play, 1922); Dorothy L. Sayers (He That Should Come, 1938) and Antony Brown (David and the Donkey, (1966).

Jean-Paul Sartre's first play was Bariona, ou le Fils du tonnerre, a nativity play performed on Christmas Eve 1940 while a prisoner of war in a German stalag. Sartre saw Christ as part of the Jewish Resistance to the Roman Empire's occupation, mirroring the French Resistance of Nazi Germany's occupation.

== See also ==
- Passion Play - a play about the Passion (death of Jesus) performed at Easter
- Nativity scene - a visual depiction of the Nativity, also known as a crib or creche
- Madrigal dinner — American Christmas musical dinner theater
