= Gift of Christmas =

Christmas pageant in Plano, Texas, USA

The Gift of Christmas (GOC) is one of the largest Christmas pageants in the US, and is one of the top-rated Christmas-related events in the state of Texas. It takes place in the Worship Center of Prestonwood Baptist Church, in Plano, Texas. GOC is one of three major outreach efforts of Prestonwood, with the others being PowerPoint Ministries and Prestonwood Sports Outreach.

It usually has 500 persons, 70 pieces of orchestra and 100 behind-the-scenes technical crew members, a large number of whom are volunteers. Each year there are around 12 to 14 GOC performances, most of which sell out. There are about 70,000 guests who watch production every year, except 2020 at the beginning of the COVID-19 pandemic.

== The performance ==
The Gift of Christmas is divided into three acts, with no intermission between them. (It was listed as two acts prior to a 2021 revision.)

The first act is oriented toward the secular observances of Christmas (e.g. non-religious Christmas songs, portrayal of Santa Claus) with children playing prominent roles in the scenes, and the highlight is the arrival of Santa Claus and his departure in his sleigh on Christmas Eve. The sleigh rises high above the audience, landing in the balcony area.

The second and third acts (the second act prior to 2021) are oriented toward the religious side of Christmas with adults playing prominent roles in the scenes. Act II features traditional religious Christmas songs, and the highlight is the rendition of "The Little Drummer Boy" with drummers drumming high above the audience. Act III is a Live Nativity, presenting the story of Jesus' birth, and the highlight is the live animals accompanying the Wise Men bringing their gifts, with the entire cast and crew bowing before the Baby Jesus.

After the second act a Gospel presentation is given. The total running time for the entire performance is around two hours.

Past performances have featured:

- Flying angels and flying drummer boys (the flying drummer boys are often the most popular act)
- Live animals (camels, donkeys, sheep) including horse-drawn carriages
- Appearances by: Raggedy Ann dolls, Frosty the Snowman, Rudolph the Red-Nosed Reindeer, music box figurines, a Ballet dancer, rapping penguins, gingerbread men, dancing Christmas trees, reindeer, elves, Santa Claus and Mrs Claus, and a real sleigh that flies 70 feet (21 m) over the audience.
- Various forms of dance, including tap, swing, ballroom, hip hop, and ballet.
- Special effects (fog, lightning, earthquakes, the audience sprinkled with confetti, surrounded by stars, and even snow

== Stage and seating ==
The GOC stage includes an 85-foot-wide (26 m) proscenium arch, and about 15,000 square feet (1,400 m^{2}) of staging area including an orchestra pit. This is larger than the normal platform for Prestonwood's church services, requiring removal of 1,000 seats from the lower seating area (reducing the overall seating capacity from the normal 7,000 during services to around 6,000).

However, even with the reduced capacity, the still-large sanctuary provides a suitable venue for GOC performances (unobstructed sight-lines from every seat, with the farthest seat less than one-and-a-half times the width of the stage from the closest seat, along with lighting and sound quality the same in any seat).
