= William Hamper =

- Born: December 12, 1776
- Died: May 3, 1831 (aged 54)

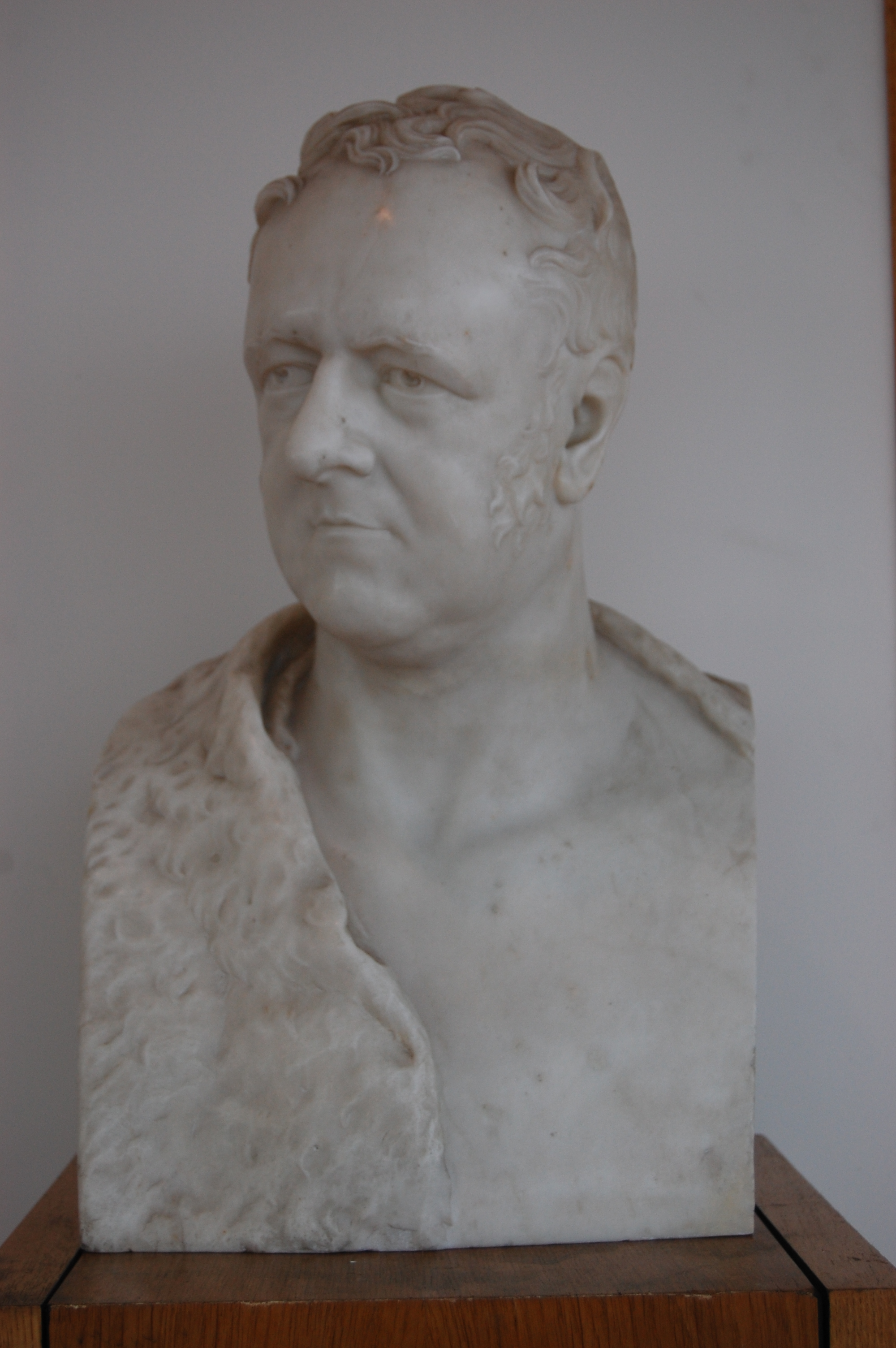
Bust in the Library of Birmingham

William Hamper (12 December 1776 – 3 May 1831) was an English businessman, magistrate and antiquary.

== Life ==
He was the only child of Thomas Hamper of West Tarring, Sussex, and his wife Elizabeth Tyson, born at Birmingham on 12 December 1776. Both parents died in 1811, and were buried in the churchyard of King's Norton Worcestershire. William was brought up in his father's business as a brassfounder, and to extend it he travelled widely.

In 1811, he was appointed a Justice of the Peace for Warwickshire. In 1817 he became a correspondent of the Society of Antiquaries, and was elected a Fellow on 5 April 1821.

He died suddenly at Highgate, Birmingham, on 3 May 1831, and was buried with his parents. Monuments to their memory are also in King's Norton churchyard.

== Works ==
He began his literary career by contributing poems to the Gentleman's Magazine the first being ‘The Beggar-Boy,’ 1798, p. 794, which was signed ‘H. D. B.,’ the initial letters of Hamper, Deritend, Birmingham. The best known of these was ‘The Devil's Dike, a Sussex Legend’, which was reprinted in Brighton guide-books. From 1804 to 1812 he sent the same periodical views and descriptions of English churches and other buildings of antiquity. About the same time he composed and published, under the name of ‘Repmah,’ an anagram of Hamper, some songs and airs.

Hamper was well versed in Anglo-Saxon and medieval latinity, and was an accurate facsimilist. John Nichols in his ‘History of Leicestershire,’ George Ormerod in ‘Cheshire,’ William Bray in ‘Surrey,’ and Edmund Cartwright in ‘Sussex’ acknowledged help from him, and he gave assistance to the anonymous author of ‘Kenilworth Illustrated,’ 1821.

Hamper published two separate works:

- ‘Observations on certain Ancient Pillars of Memorial called Hoar-Stones, to which is added a conjecture on the Croyland Inscription,’ Birmingham, 1820; a pamphlet. The materials which he had collected for an enlarged edition were inserted in ‘Archæologia,’ xxv. 24–60.
- ‘The Life, Diary, and Correspondence of Sir William Dugdale’ (1827); pt. ii. of the appendix, consisting of an index to the manuscript collections of Dugdale, was issued separately in 1826. This was Hamper's major work.

For many years Hamper was engaged in preparing a new edition of Dugdale's ‘Antiquities of Warwickshire,’ and collected vast materials. His copy of that volume, with manuscript additions, went to the British Museum. At the sale of his library the firm of Beilby, Knott, & Beilby acquired his notes for a distinct history of Aston and Birmingham. His copy of William Hutton's ‘Birmingham,’ interleaved and covered with annotations, went to Alderman Avery of Birmingham, and a mass of his letters and manuscripts was in the Staunton Warwickshire collection, which was purchased and presented to the corporation reference library at Birmingham. These were burnt, but many of his letters had been copied and printed in the notes and queries column of the ‘Birmingham Weekly Post.’

Hamper edited a volume of ‘Masques performed before Queen Elizabeth. From a coeval copy, Chiswick, 1820,’ which he (wrongly) attributed to George Ferrers; and he printed for private circulation in 1822 ‘Two Copies of Verses on the Meeting of Charles the First and Henrietta Maria, in the Valley of Kineton, below Edge-Hill, July 13, 1643,’ which were preserved in manuscript among Dugdale's papers. Many of his communications on rings, seals, and runic inscriptions appeared in ‘Archæologia,’ vols. xix–xxv. Notes by him on books are inserted in Thomas Frognall Dibdin's ‘Bibliomania’ (1876, ed.) pp. 117, 529, and in his ‘Bibliographical Decameron,’ iii. 253–4.

From 1812 to 1831 he was an intimate friend and correspondent of John Britton, whom he aided in compiling the ‘Beauties of England and Wales,’ and the ‘Dictionary of Architecture and Archæology in the Middle Ages.’ A list of 140 ways of spelling Birmingham, drawn up by Hamper, appears in John Alfred Langford's ‘Century of Birmingham Life.’

== Personal life ==
On 7 November 1803, Hamper married Jane Sharp at Ringwood, Hampshire. Hamper's wife is the youngest daughter of William Sharp of Newport, Isle of Wight, a politician and literary student. They have three daughters. On 6 June 1829, Hamper's wife died.
