= David Gunn =

David Gunn may refer to:

- David Gunn (author), military science fiction author
- David Gunn (composer), American composer
- David Gunn (doctor) (1946–1993), American doctor and murder victim
- David John Gunn (1887–1955), New Zealand farmer and bushman
- David L. Gunn (born 1937), American-Canadian railroad administrator
- David M. Gunn, Old Testament scholar
- David Gunn (American football), American football coach
- David Gunn (singer), lead vocalist for American heavy metal band King 810
