= Bridal veil (disambiguation) =

A bridal veil is a piece of clothing or hanging cloth that is intended to cover (a part) of the head or face of a bride.

Bridal veil may also refer to:

- Bridal Veil, Oregon, an unincorporated community
- Bridal Veil Falls (disambiguation), a number of waterfalls
- Gibasis pellucida, a houseplant commonly known as 'Tahitian bridal veil'

== See also ==
- Bridalveil Creek Campground
