= Routeburn Classic =

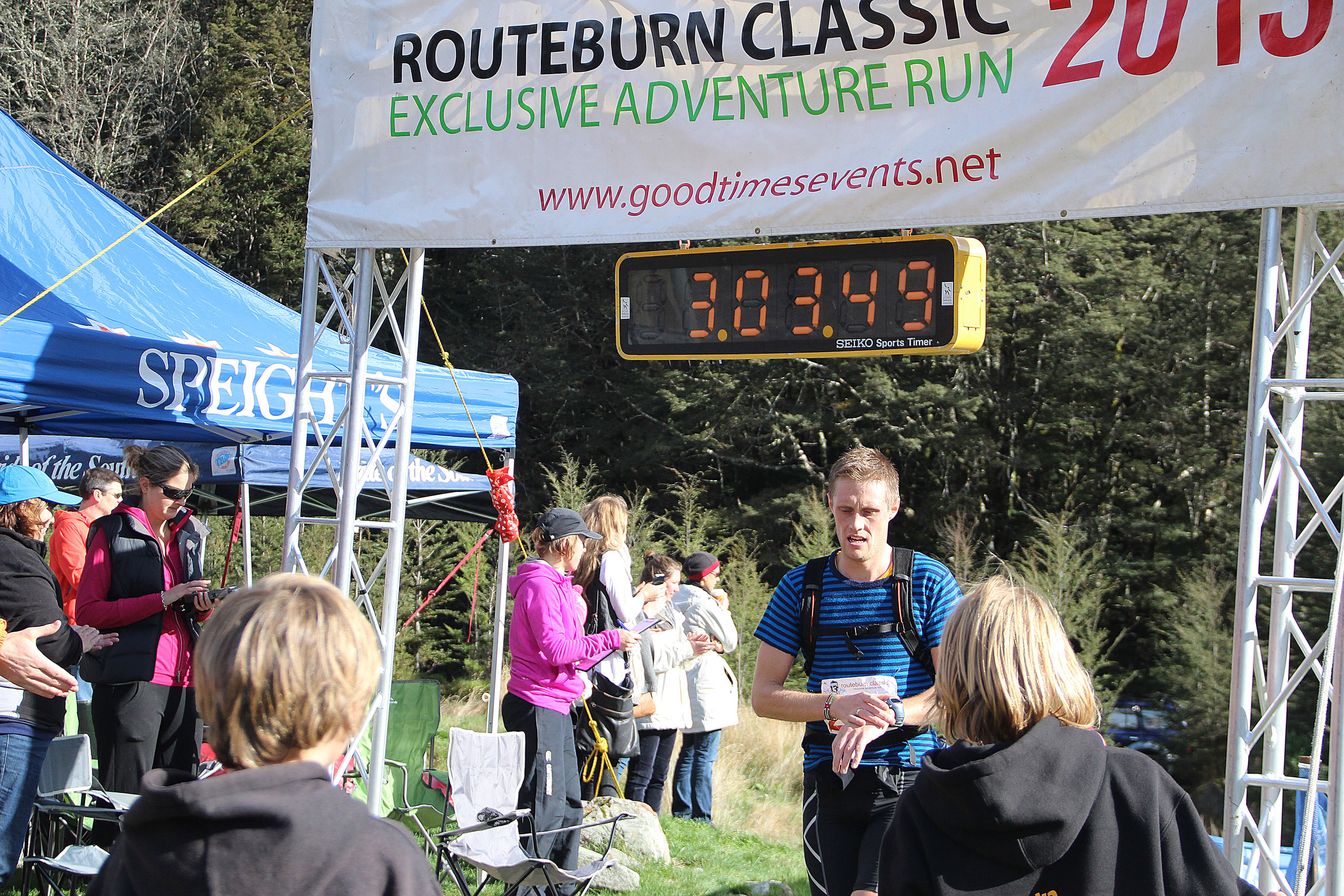
- A Routeburn Classic event
- Date: April
- Location: Routeburn Track, New Zealand
- Event type: Mountain
- Distance: 32.2 km
- Established: 2001
- Course records: Men: 2:37:51; Women: 3:16:48
- Website: goodtimesevents.net

The Routeburn Classic mountain run is a mountain running event in New Zealand and is 32 km (20 mi) in distance, following the entire Routeburn Track. It is an annual event which was first held in 2001, and draws many local competitors as well as many international runners. Numbers are limited to about 350 for each event to reduce impact on the area, which is one of the great walks in New Zealand and is looked after by the Department of Conservation.

== Route ==
The race starts at the Divide (which is the Te Anau end) at 8 am on the main road which is closed to traffic. This allows the field to spread out before entering the track which is narrow in places. The course follows the track uphill for most of the way to the Howden Hut After that, the track again ascends upwards, passing through Earland Falls then through The Orchard and on to McKenzie Hut, which is the first of the checkpoints. The next section is a long uphill before runners eventually reaching another major checkpoint at the Harris Saddle. Nearby is the highest point on the Routeburn Track at 1300m. Runners pass above the scenic Lake Harris before the track descends with a tricky rock section towards the last major checkpoint at the Routeburn Falls Hut. The track continues down until the Routeburn Flats Hut, where it begins to even out into a reasonably flat gradient. The last 6 kilometres pass over several streams before the finish line at the Routeburn Shelter.

== Records ==
Often the fastest runners complete the entire track in under three hours; the average tramper will take about three days to walk the same distance. The current records are held by Jack Beaumont set in 2017 (2:37:51) for the men and Sarah Douglas set in 2014 for the women (3:16:48).

== Community support ==
Many volunteers donate time to help out in the organisation and running of the event. One of the main volunteer roles is that of marshalling. Marshalls are posted in key locations along the track and monitor runners as they pass through, making sure everyone is accounted for and helping anyone who gets injured or needs assistance.

== Weather ==
Being a mountain environment, the weather can change at any moment with rain, snow and ice events in some years making conditions challenging. In the 2016 race it was postponed to the Sunday because of adverse weather conditions. In the 2018 race it was delayed until the Sunday because of snow and then cancelled due to dangerous track conditions.

== See also ==
- Routeburn Track
- Trail running
