= Routeburn Track =

Hiking track in New Zealand

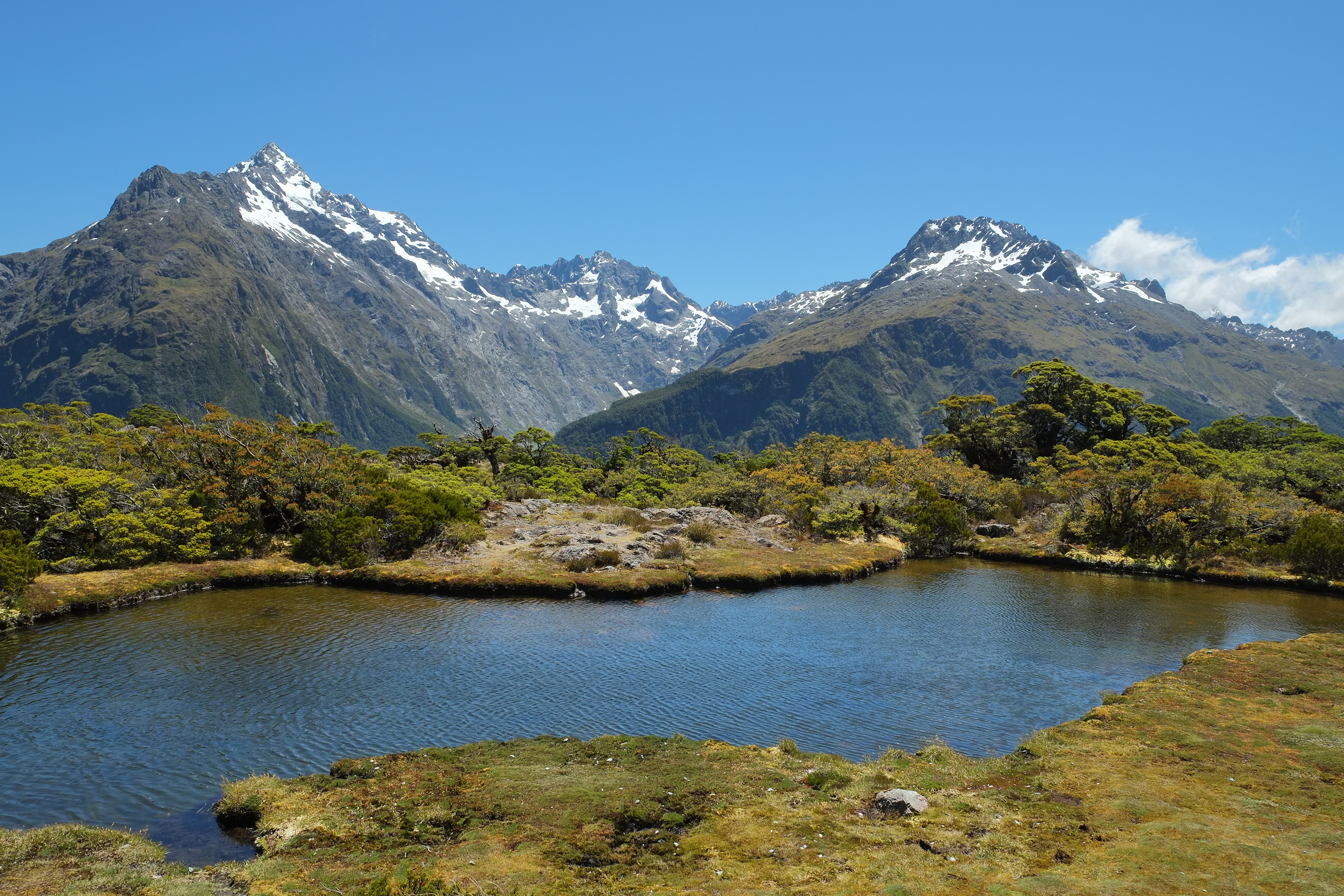
- Key Summit as viewed from track
- Length: 32 km (20 mi)
- Location: Fiordland and Mount Aspiring National Parks, New Zealand
- Designation: New Zealand Great Walk
- Trailheads: Routeburn Shelter, The Divide
- Use: Tramping, trail running
- Highest point: near Harris Saddle 1,300 m (4,300 ft)
- Lowest point: Routeburn Shelter, 477 m (1,565 ft)
- Difficulty: medium
- Season: Summer to autumn
- Months: Late October to late April. Possible to walk in winter months too, but for experienced hikers only
- Sights: Alpine views, lakes, forests, tussocklands, rivers, waterfalls
- Hazards: Hypothermia, sunburn, high winds, rocks, snow, rain & avalanche risks
- Surface: Dirt, rock
- Website: doc.govt.nz/parks-and-recreation/tracks-and-walks/fiordland/northern-fiordland/routeburn-track

The Routeburn Track is a 32 km tramping (hiking) track found in the South Island of New Zealand. The track can be done in either direction, starting on the Queenstown side of the Southern Alps, at the northern end of Lake Wakatipu or on the Te Anau side, at the Divide, several kilometres from the Homer Tunnel to Milford Sound.

The New Zealand Department of Conservation classifies this track as a Great Walk and maintains three huts along the track: Routeburn Flats Hut, Routeburn Falls Hut, and Lake Mackenzie Hut; in addition there is an emergency shelter at Harris Saddle. The track overlaps both the Mount Aspiring and Fiordland National Parks, with the border and highest point being the Harris Saddle. There is access to another tramping area called the Greenstone and Caples Tracks from Lake Howden near The Divide.

This area gets much less rain than Milford Sound, and the forests are very different, especially on the eastern side of the saddle, which due to less rainfall is predominantly made up of New Zealand red beech and mountain beech, with relatively few ferns. The track spends a long time on the high ridges around Harris Saddle, with great long-distance views in many directions. The track has a long history of use dating back to the 1880s.

== Tramping ==
Access to the Routeburn Track is not as tightly controlled as the Milford Track. Camping is allowed, though both huts and camping spaces must be booked in advance during peak season. There is a choice of which direction to go, and which huts to stay in. On the western side, most trampers stay at the Lake Mackenzie Hut, but on the eastern side, one can stay at the Falls Hut or Flats Hut. The Falls Hut is more popular, since staying there breaks up the climb to the saddle better, especially coming from the east. Camping is not allowed at Falls Hut. In the winter, the Falls Hut is commonly used as a ski touring base for easy access into the Serpentine Range and beyond.

As it is a relatively short track, much of the Routeburn Track is also accessible to day hikers. Key Summit (918m), on the western end is the site of a popular viewpoint and nature walk not far from the roadway, and the return to the Routeburn Flats Hut are both commonly done in a day.

Because you usually tramp the track from one end and finish it at the other transport can be challenging: the distance between trackheads is 340 km (a 5-hour drive). Transport options include bus, hitchhiking or car relocation. Some people get around this by doing a key swap with another walker going in the opposite direction.

== Track profile ==
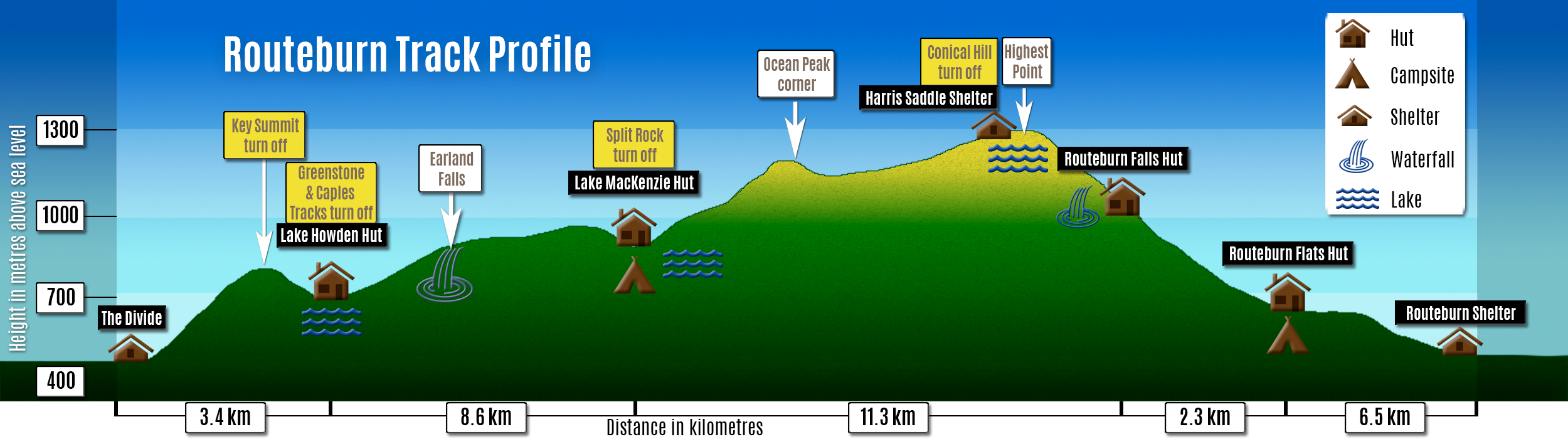
Routeburn Track Profile (Note: Lake Howden Hut was destroyed by landslide in February 2020)

== The route ==
Starting at Routeburn Road end, the track crosses a suspension bridge and starts as a gentle sidle up the true left hand side of the Routeburn River. The well graded track crosses Sugarloaf stream (start/finish of the classic five pass tramp) and the Bridal Veil waterfall and leads to a steeper climb that goes above the gorge to Forge Flats, the site of an early blacksmith camp. The valley opens up soon after this point, re-crosses the Routeburn and heads towards the Routeburn flats.

Leaving the Routeburn Flats hut, the track climbs steadily towards the Routeburn Falls Hut, passing Eagle Bluff and Emily creek, and across the site of a major slip in 1994. This slip has cleared the beech forest from around the track affording views back down the Routeburn as well as up the Routeburn (north branch) towards Mt. Somnus (2293m) and Mt Momus (2148m).

Past the Routeburn Falls hut, the track becomes narrower and more technical as it climbs past Lake Harris. Passing under bluffs as it sidles around Lake Harris and there is a view up 'the valley of trolls' towards Lake Wilson (the source of the Routeburn) and the Serpentine Range.

Above Lake Harris, the track arrives at the Harris shelter. The popular side trip to Conical Hill (1515m) is commonly done from the shelter, and offers a 360 degree view of the area. From the saddle (1255m), the track traverses southwards along the Hollyford face, with expansive views out to Martins Bay and the Tasman Sea, before a descent of a steep series of zig-zags to Lake Mackenzie Hut.

From Lake Mackenzie, the track crosses a small flat before climbing to the tree line. It then gradually descends past the 'Orchard', an open grassy area dotted with ribbonwood trees, to Earland Falls (174m high). The route passes under the falls but in times of heavy flow an alternative route exists dropping below the falls to a small bridge. The track continues its gradual descent down to Lake Howden. From here the track branches off towards the Greenstone and Caples Tracks which create a semi-circuit back towards Glenorchy, the Routeburn continuing past Key Summit to The Divide road end and the end of the track.

New Zealand Mountain Safety Council's video on the Routeburn Track

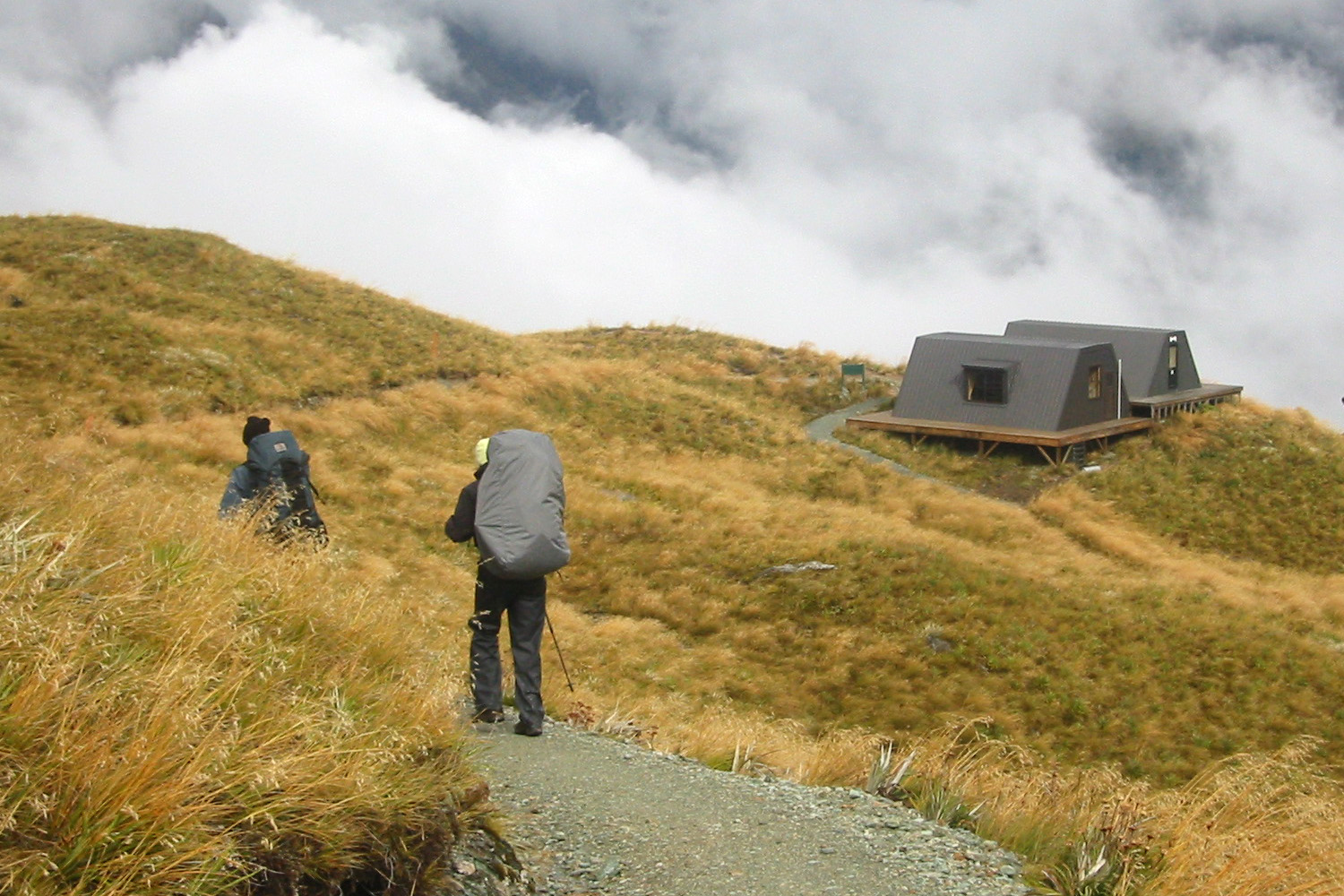
Routeburn Track emergency shelters at Harris Saddle

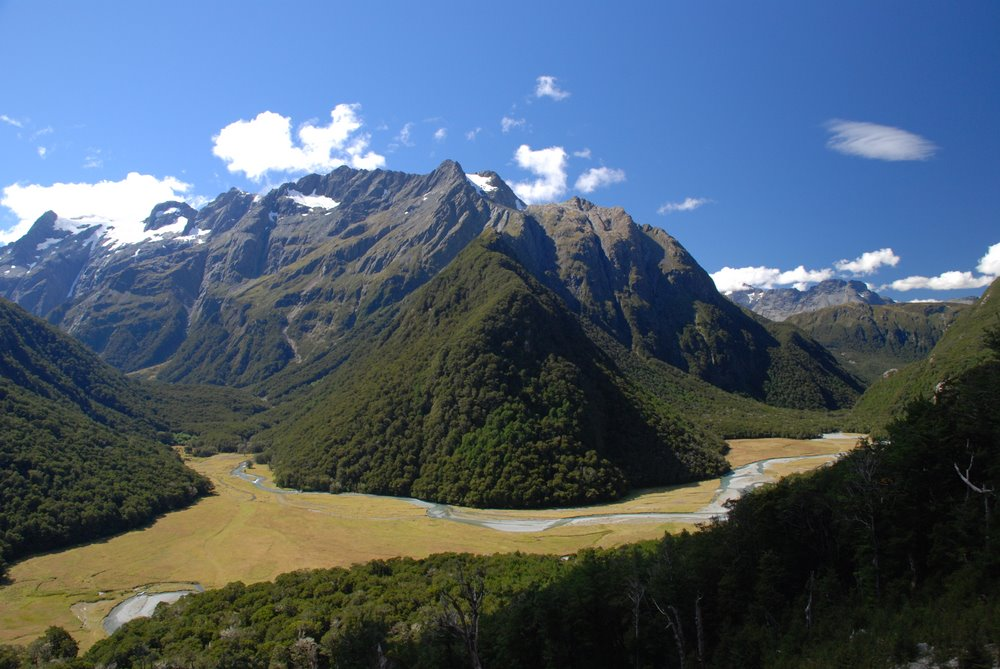
View of the Humboldt Mountains from the track

Point	Coordinates (links to map & photo sources)	Notes
Routeburn Shelter	44.718018°S 168.274247°E	477m. Start/end of track.
Routeburn Flats Hut and Camp	44.725466°S 168.214794°E	685m.
Route Burn (North Branch)	44.690586°S 168.207799°E	856m. Side trip.
Routeburn Falls Hut	44.725819°S 168.198392°E	972m.
Harris Saddle	44.726954°S 168.170337°E	1255m. Highest point of main track near saddle is 1300m.
Conical Hill	44.721734°S 168.169096°E	1515m. Highest point of entire track. Side trip.
Lake Mackenzie Hut	44.767611°S 168.173198°E	892m.
Lake Mackenzie Camp	44.763969°S 168.176411°E	900m. Side trip.
Key Summit	44.814847°S 168.127886°E	918m. Side trip.
State Highway 94 / The Divide	44.824875°S 168.117152°E	532m. Start/end of track.

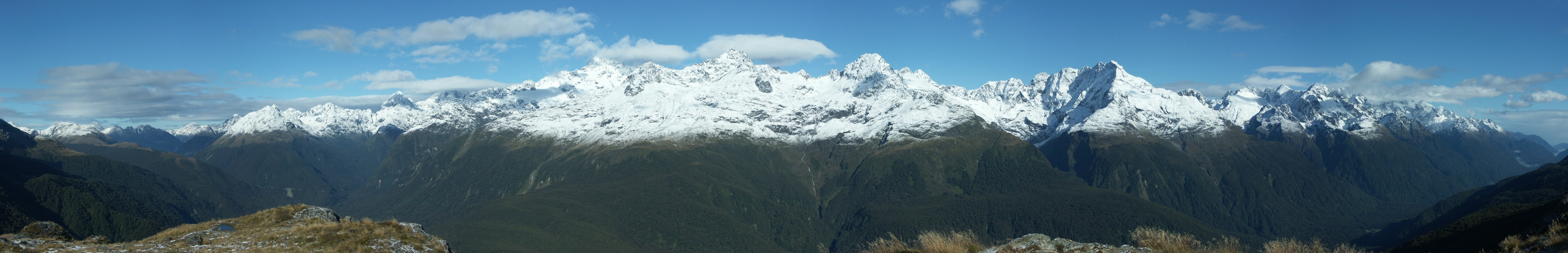
Panoramic mountain view from the Routeburn Track featuring Mount Gunn and Mount Gifford

=== Side trips ===
Various side trips can be found off the main route that are available between both ends of the Routeburn Track, and some trampers incorporate these into a full crossing while others use the main track as an access point to explore the various options available. Starting from the Routeburn Shelter and ending at the Divide some of the side trips available are:

==== Nature walk ====
A short loop track to the left of the main trail with much signage mainly made for day walkers from the Routeburn Shelter end.

==== Rockburn Track and Sugarloaf Track ====
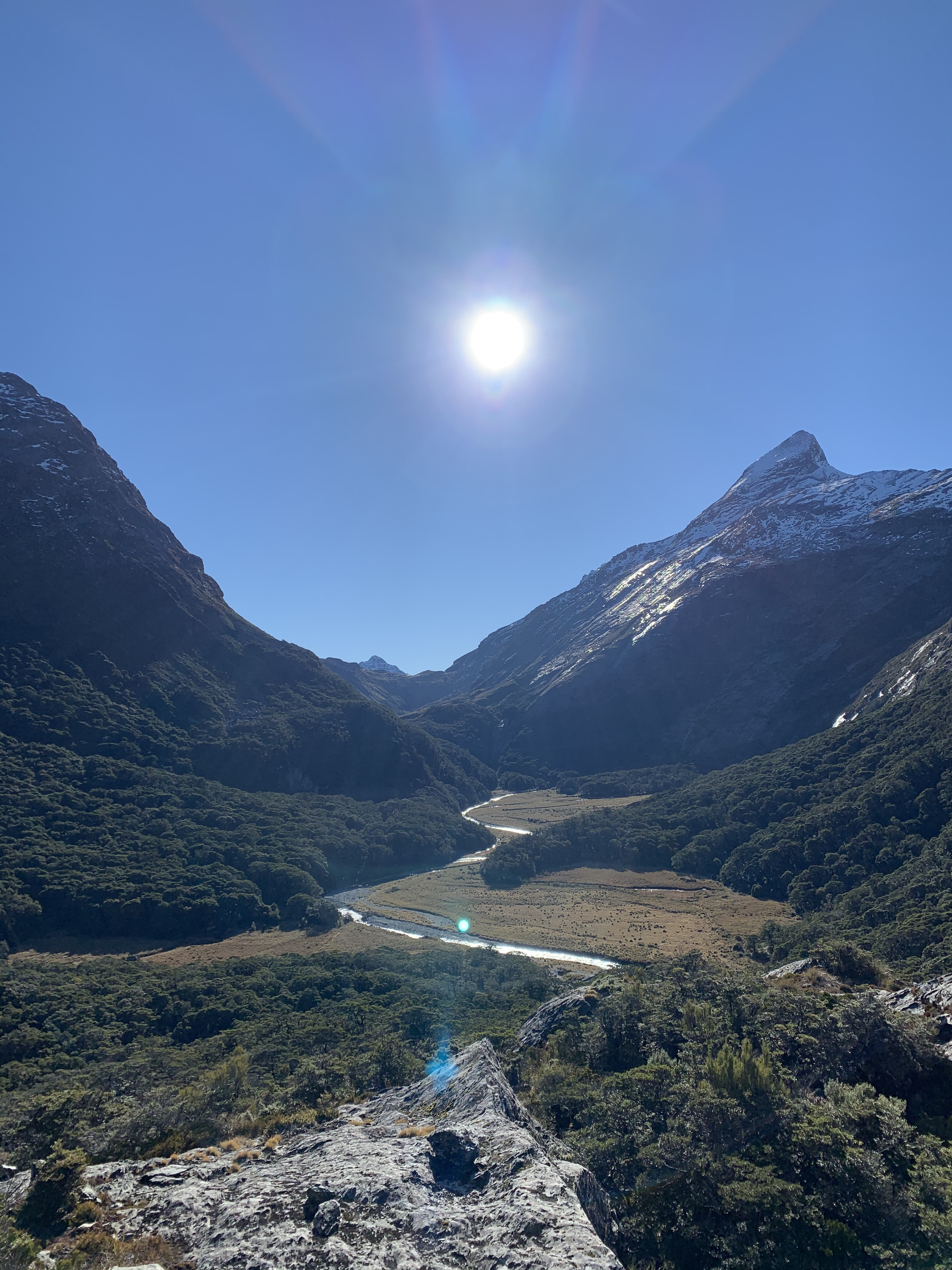
Rockburn Valley Hike

An advanced tramping track to the right of the trail that links back toward the Lake Sylvan walk and Sylvan campsite as well as the Route Burn North Branch.

==== Forge Flat ====
A small rest point in sand next to the Routeburn River.

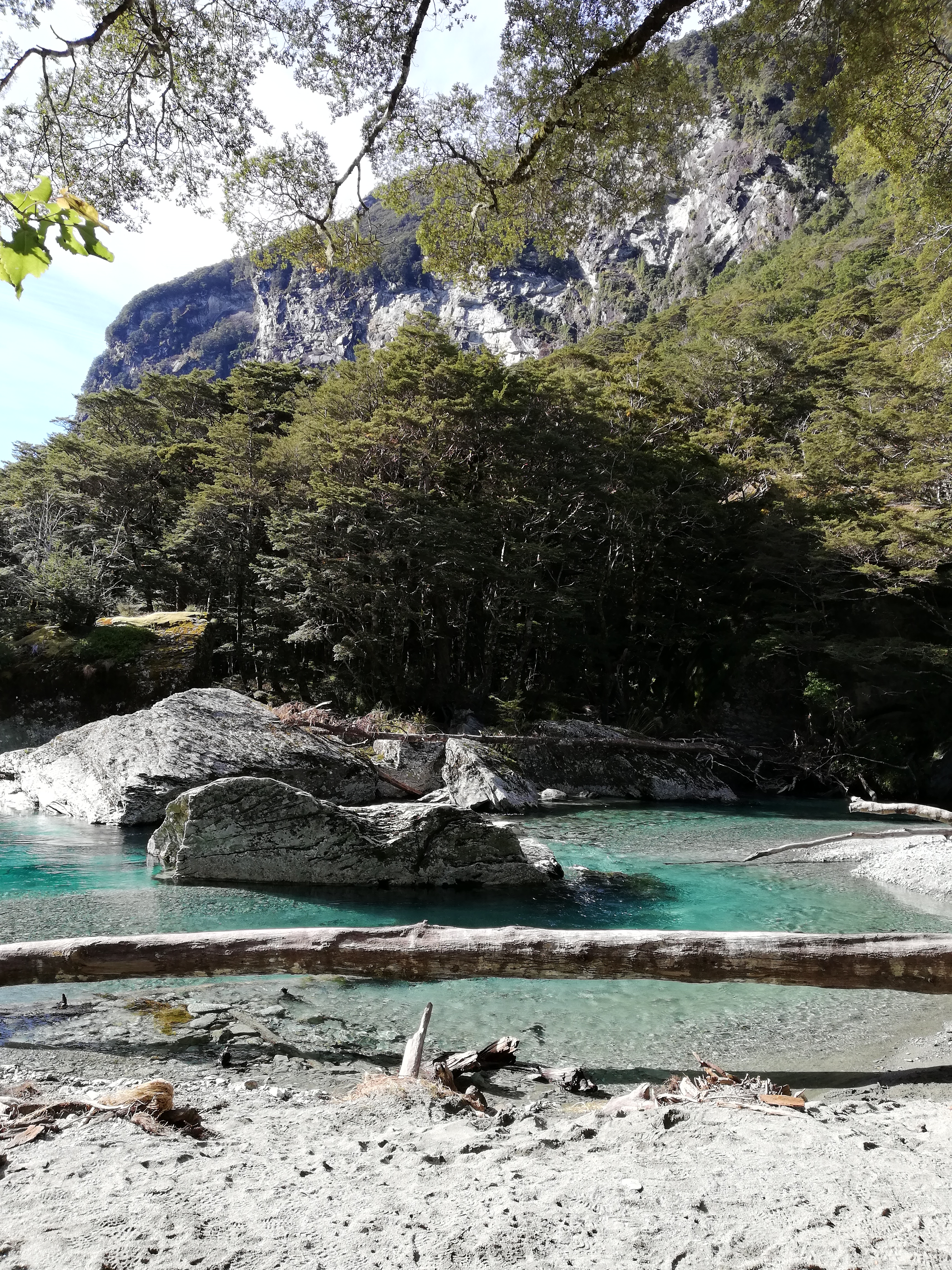
Forge Flat

==== Route Burn North Branch ====
An advanced multi-day tramping track accessed over the river from Routeburn Flats Hut; this route links with Rockburn Track and Sugarloaf Track.

==== Emily Pass ====
An unmarked advanced tramping route which via Emily Pass allows access back down to Lake Mackenzie or via Fraser Creek access into the Caples Track.

==== Lake Wilson ====
Just before the Harris Saddle Shelter and after Lake Harris to the right is an unmarked advanced tramping route which leads to Lake Wilson.

==== Conical Hill ====
From the Harris Shelter, a steep route leads to the top of Conical Hill and is the highest marked trail on the Routeburn Track.

==== Deadmans Track ====
Another advanced tramping track on the right just after the Harris Shelter but this time marked leads down to the Hollyford Road.

==== Lake Mackenzie Campsite and Split Rock ====
To the left of Mackenzie Hut a track beside the lake leads to the Lake Mackenzie campsite first and Split Rock second which is a large rock with a split large enough to walk through.

==== Howden Campsite and Greenstone and Caples Tracks ====
The track to the left of Lake Howden leads initially to the Howden Campsite and later to the Greenstone and Caples Tracks.

==== Pass Creek Track ====
A marked track which leads from the right of Lake Howden down to the Hollyford Road. This track was originally a cattle track for Davey Gunn who would take his cattle from the Hollyford to the Greenstone Valley and back.

==== Key Summit ====
The most popular side trip in terms of numbers as this track to the left (or right if approaching from the carpark) is a day walk accessible from The Divide. The track continues and then ends to become an unmarked route along the Livingstone Mountains eventually leading down a spur to McKellar Hut on the Greenstone Track.

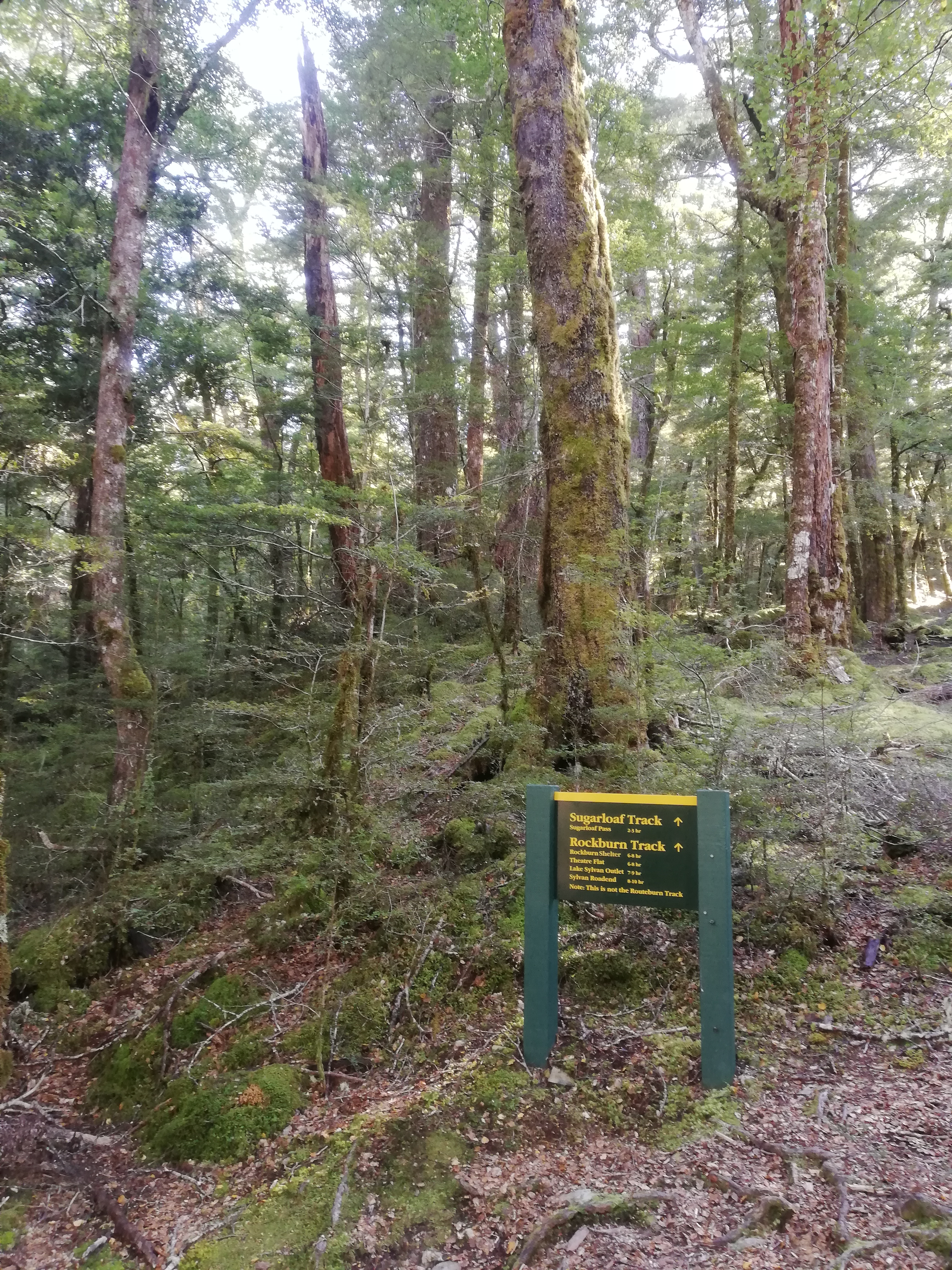
Sugarloaf and Rockburn Tracks

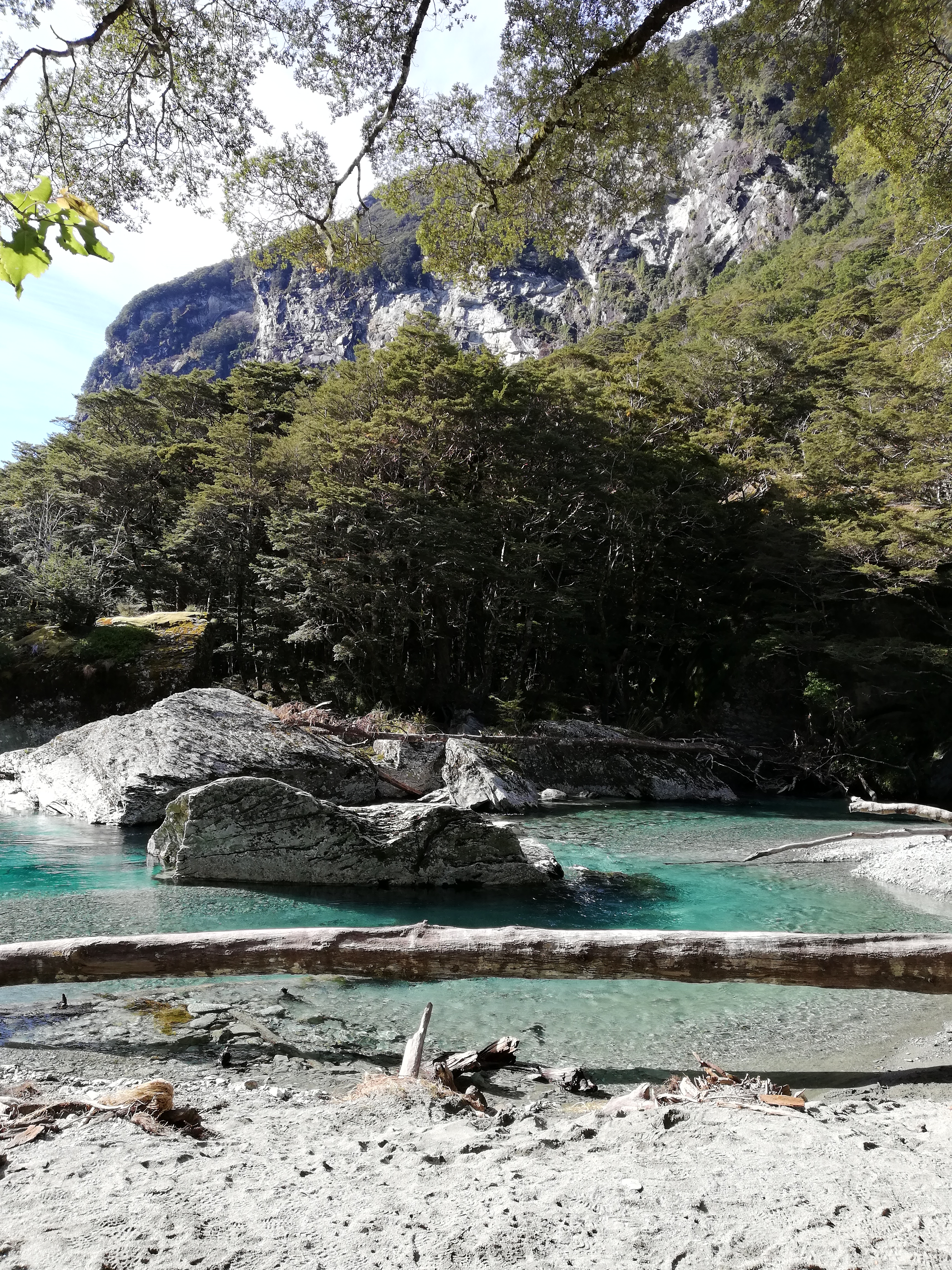
Forge Flat

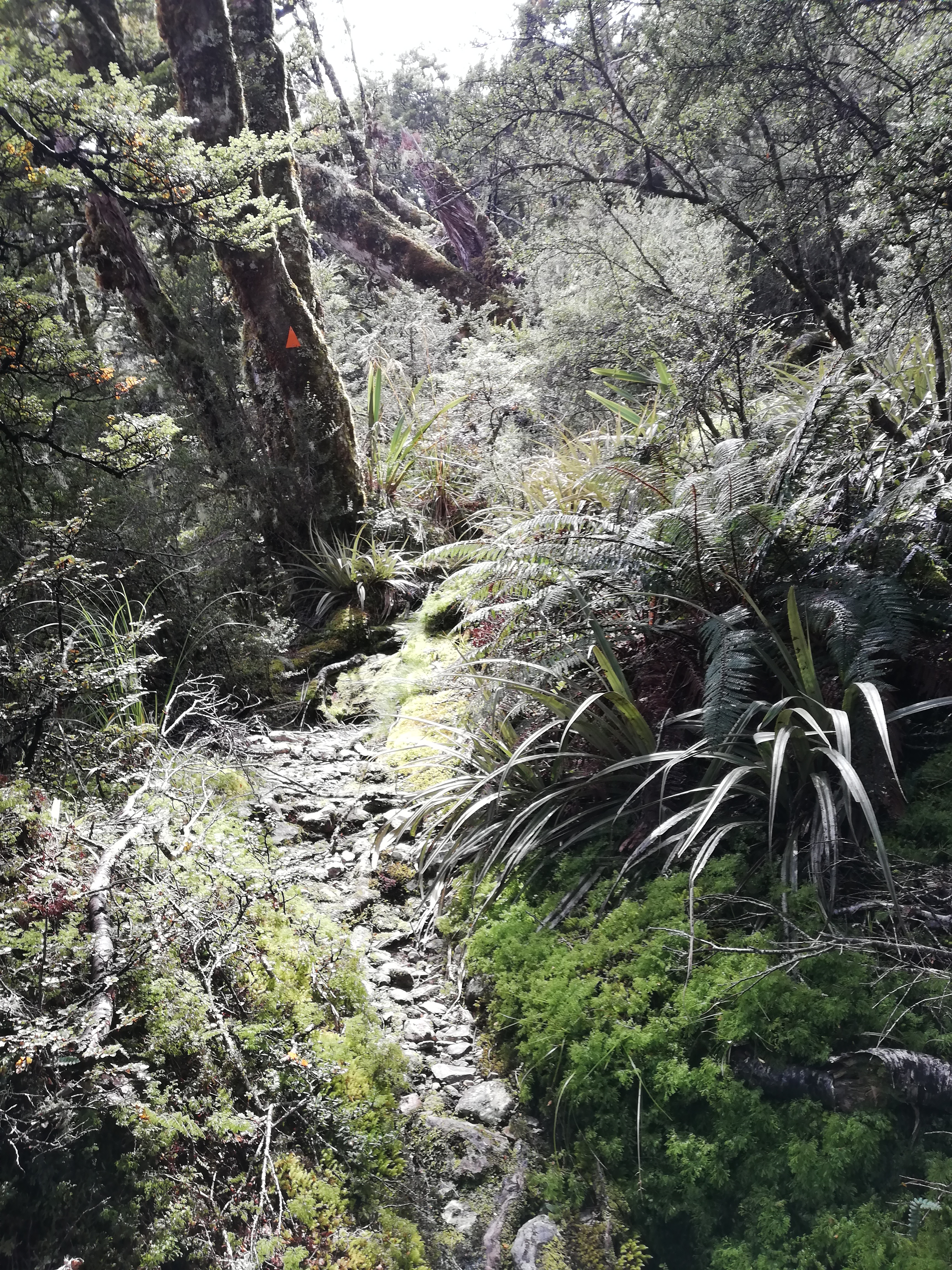
Deadmans Track

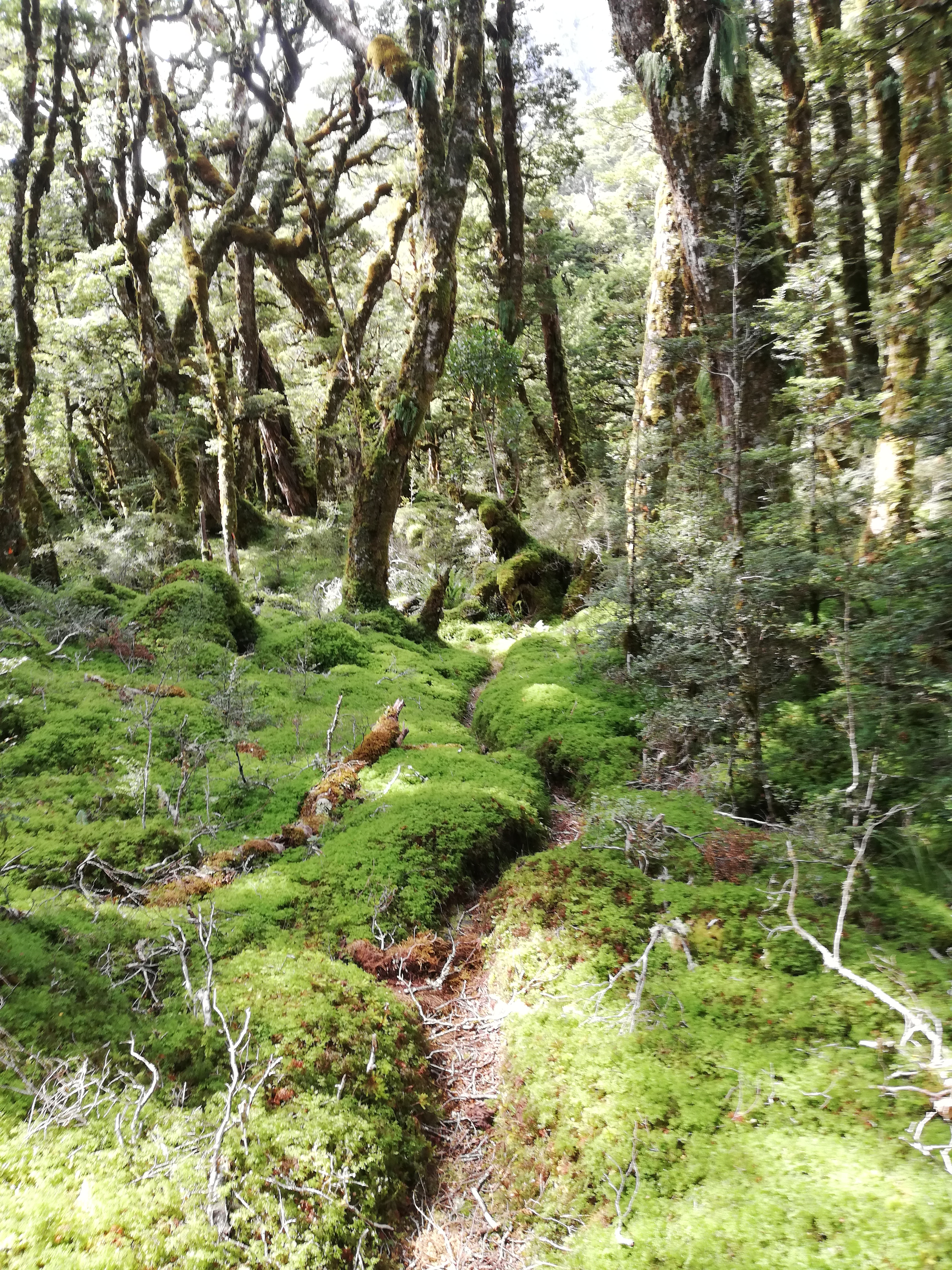
Pass Creek Track

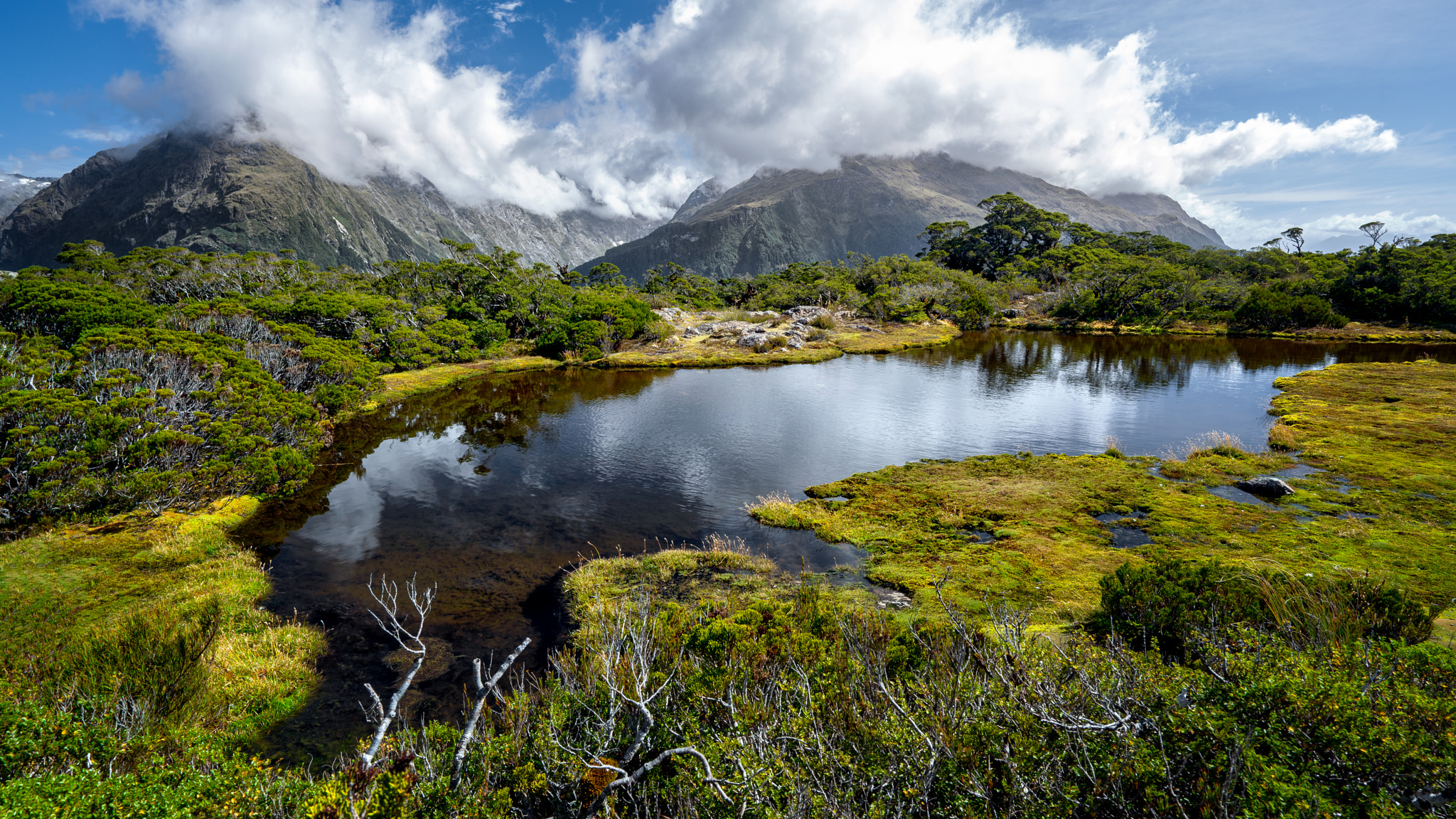
Key Summit

== In media, news, and popular culture ==
The Routeburn Track was named one of the top eleven trails in the world by the National Geographic Adventure Magazine in May 2005.

No filming was done for The Lord of the Rings trilogy on the track itself, but the Dart River Valley just north of Glenorchy and before the track starts, was the scene for Isengard.

One of Air New Zealand's safety videos, starring Bear Grylls, was filmed on the Routeburn track.

Paul Theroux, the American travel writer, described his hike on the Routeburn Track in Chapter 2 of his 1992 book, The Happy Isles of Oceania.

There is an annual mountain run the Routeburn Classic along the Routeburn track (approx 32 km) usually held in April each year that is completed in times of 3–9 hours depending on individual ability. Often the fastest runners complete the entire track in under three hours which is much faster than the 3 days the average tramper takes to complete the track.

=== Deaths ===
In December 1963 a party of 15 school students and teachers were struck by a freak blizzard while crossing the Harris saddle. Two students died of hypothermia.

In March 2008 an Israeli tourist went missing on the track. Her body was later found near Roaring Creek; it appears that she had wandered off track for an unknown reason.

In July 2016, a Czech hiker fell and died in deep snow while hiking the track in winter; his partner sheltered at the Lake Mackenzie Huts for a month before she was rescued.

In May 2018 a 68-year-old man died on the track from a "medical event".

== Huts and shelters ==
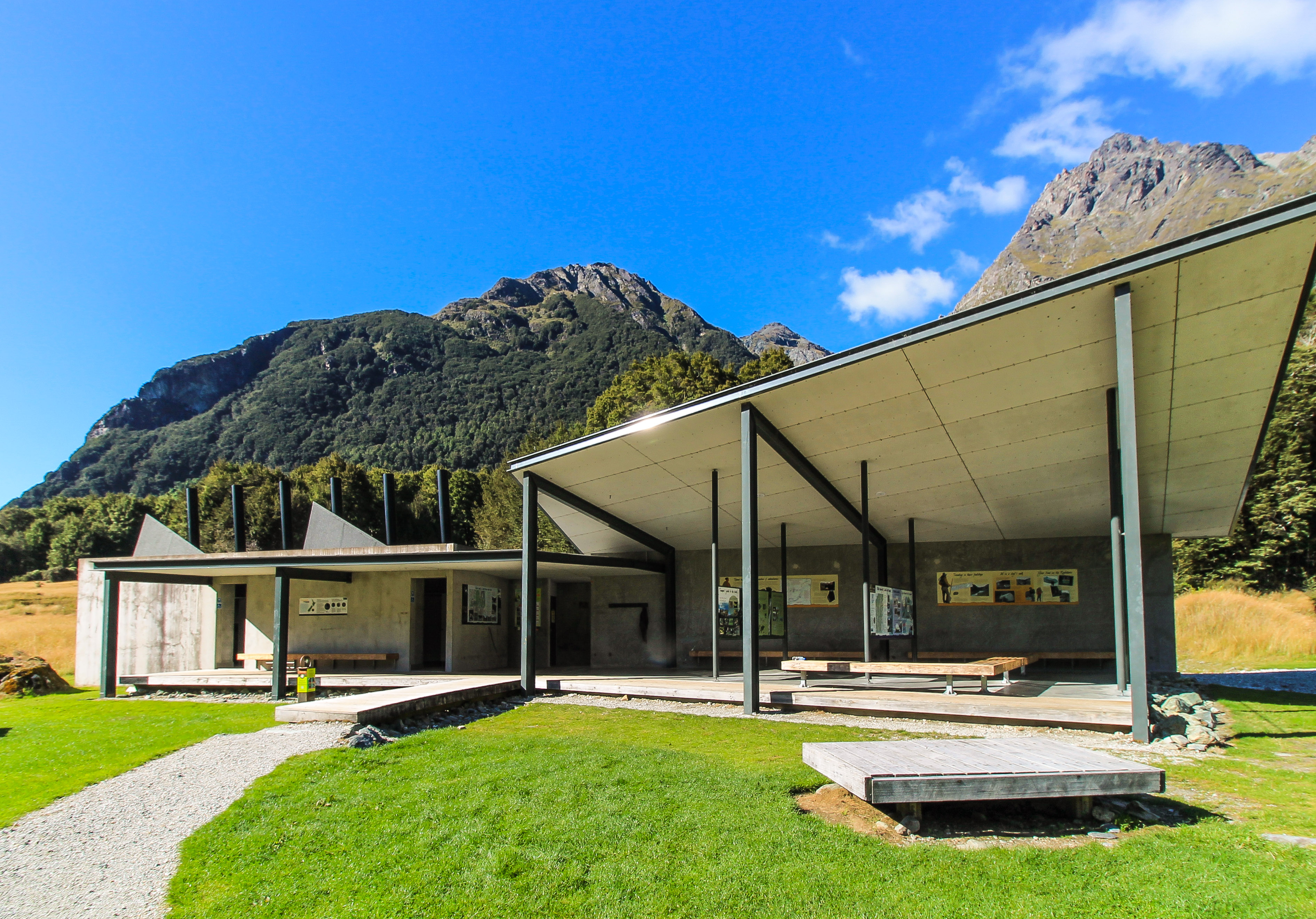
Routeburn Shelter

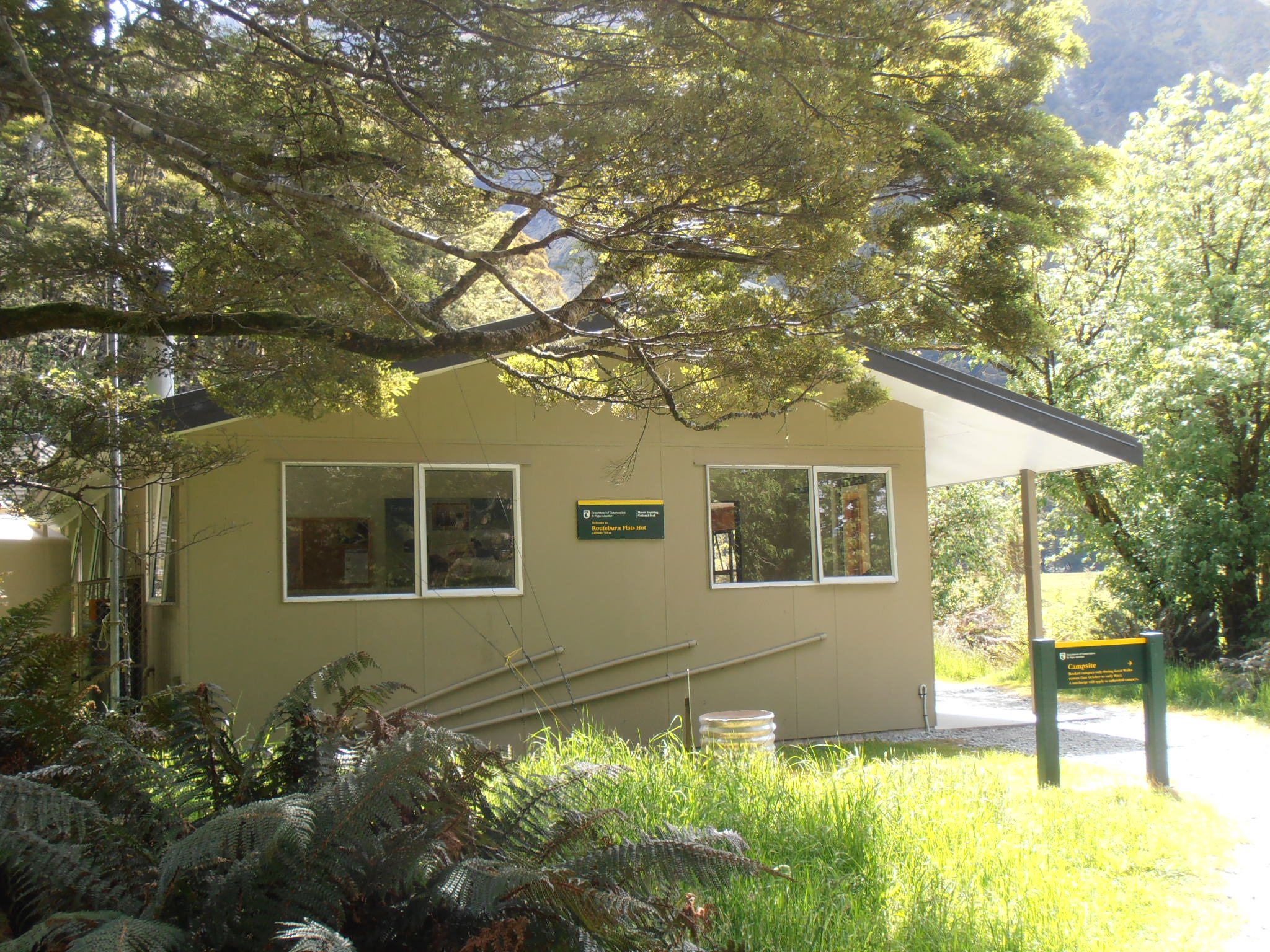
Routeburn Flats Hut

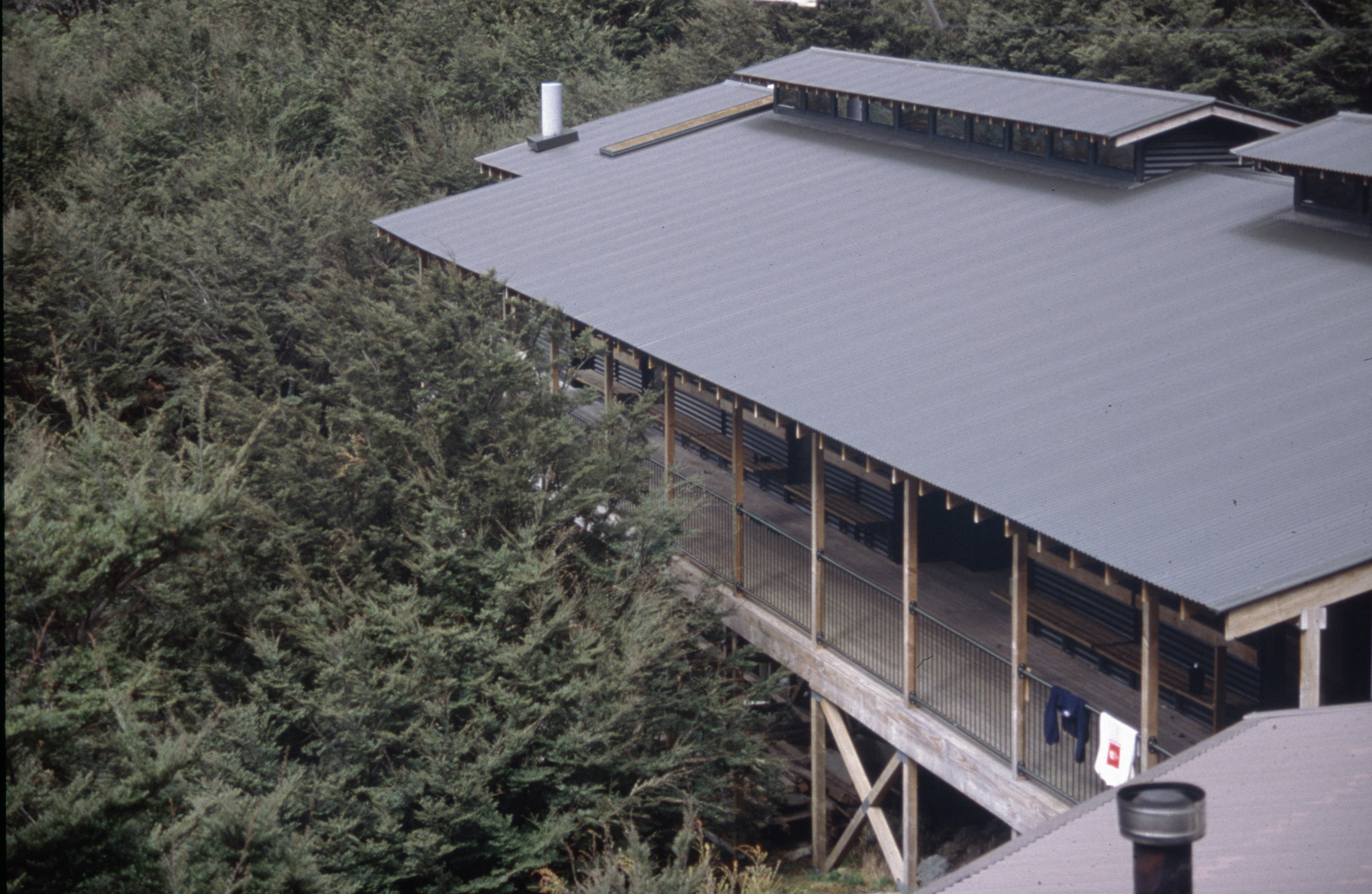
Routeburn Falls Hut

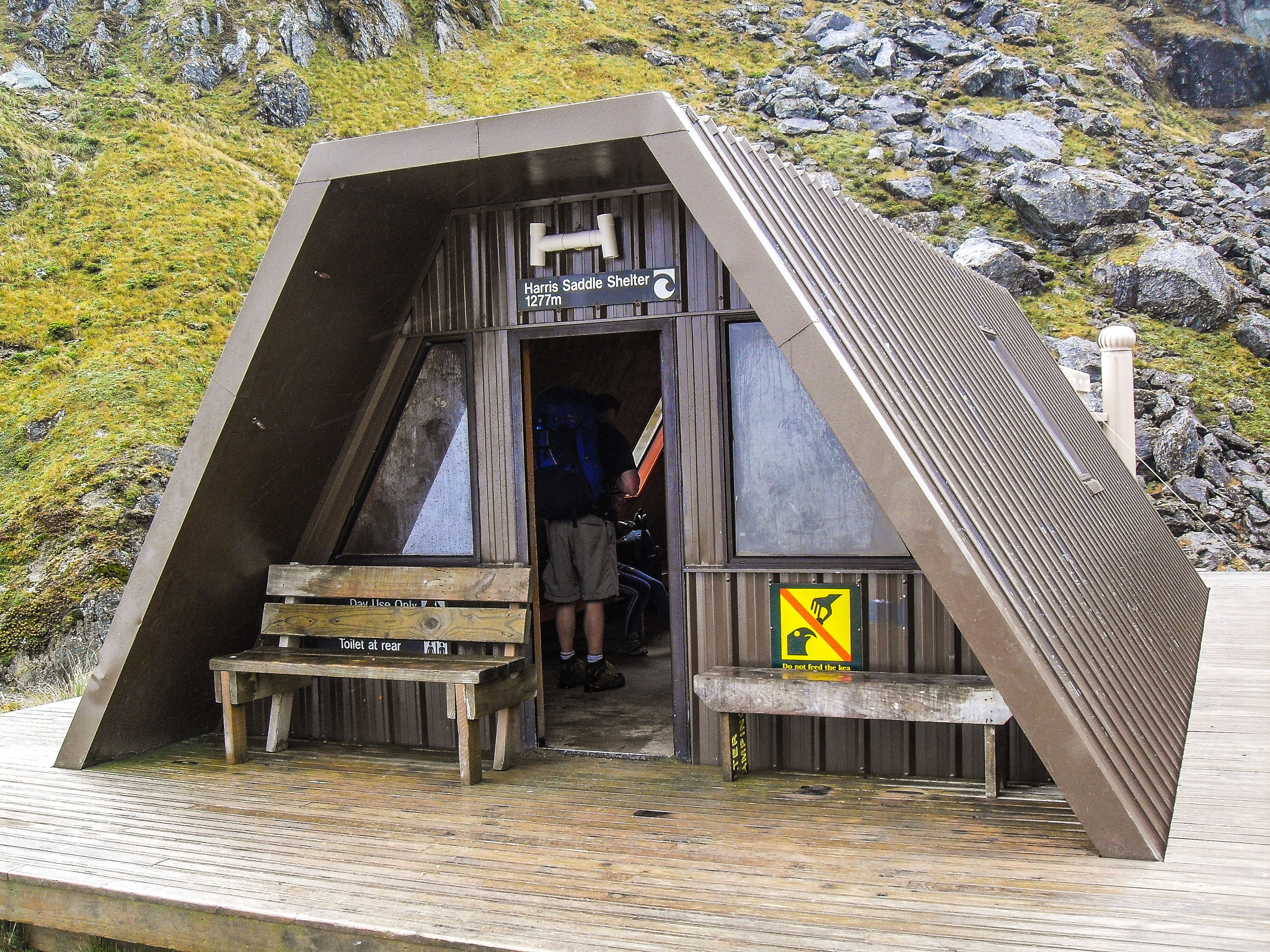
Harris Saddle Shelter

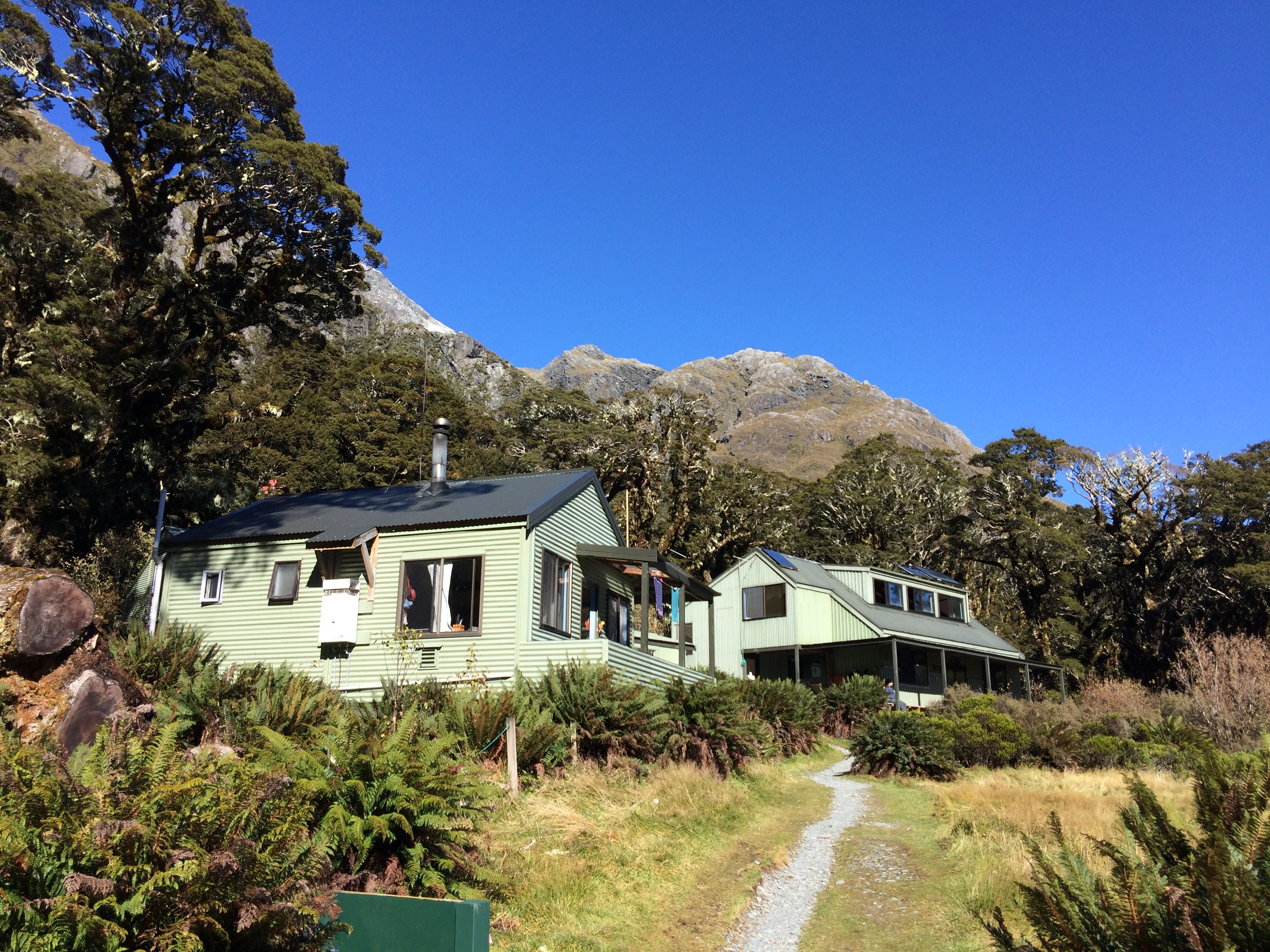
Lake Mackenzie Hut

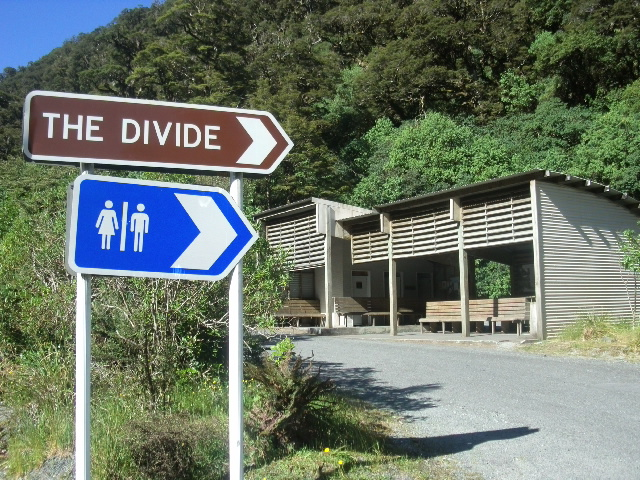
The Divide Shelter

Lake Howden Hut was a potential option for lodging between Milford Sound Road and Lake Mackenzie Hut until it was destroyed by a landslide in February 2020.

== Birdlife ==
There are a variety of New Zealand native birds to be seen on and near the track. Parrots like the kākā and kea can often be seen and heard, and are quite large in comparison to the smaller kākāriki. Often seen are the common and friendly South Island robin and fantail. Smaller birds that are conspicuous are the bellbird, grey warbler, pipipi, South Island tomtit and the rare mōhua. Hard to see is the tiny rifleman and New Zealand's smallest bird, the rock wren.

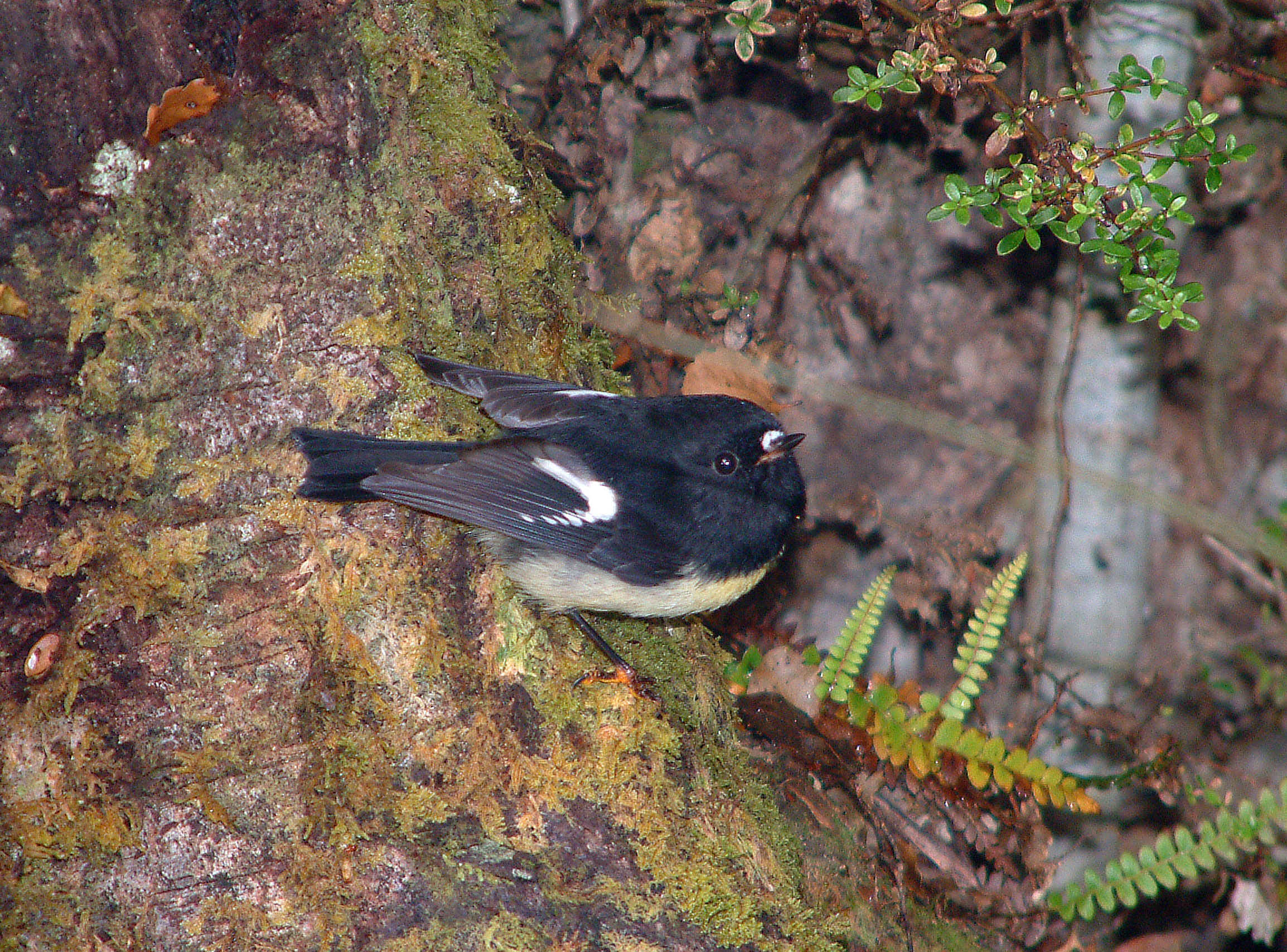
Miromiro (South Island tomtit)

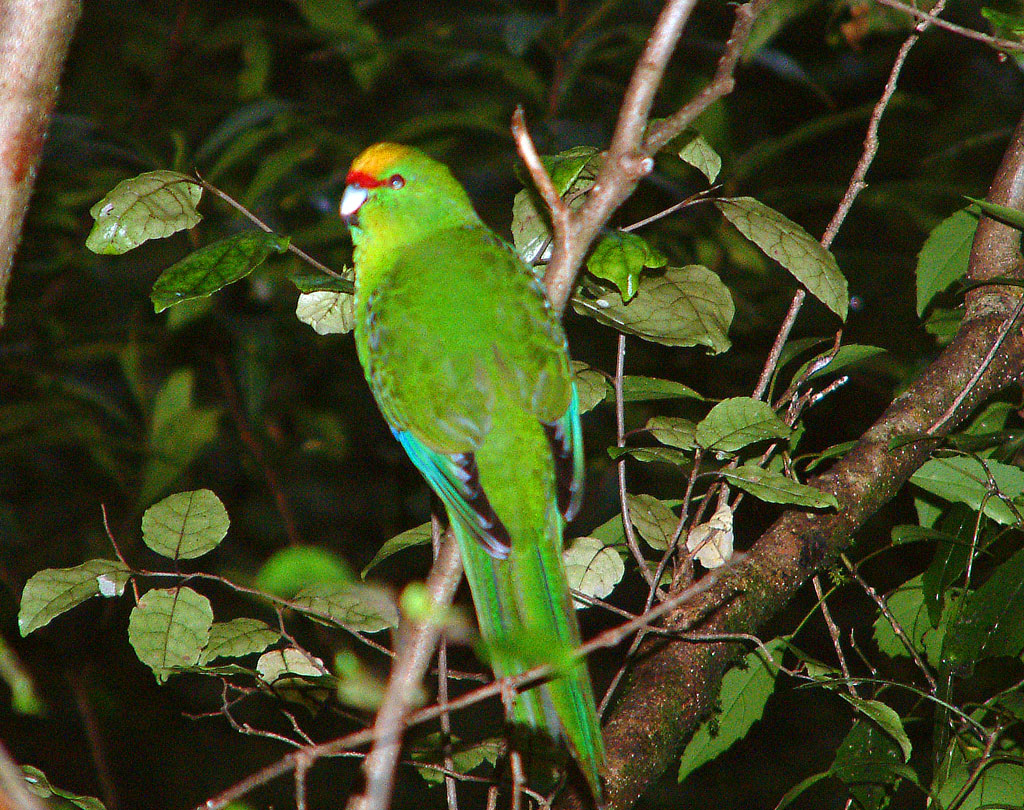
Kākāriki (yellow-crowned parakeet)

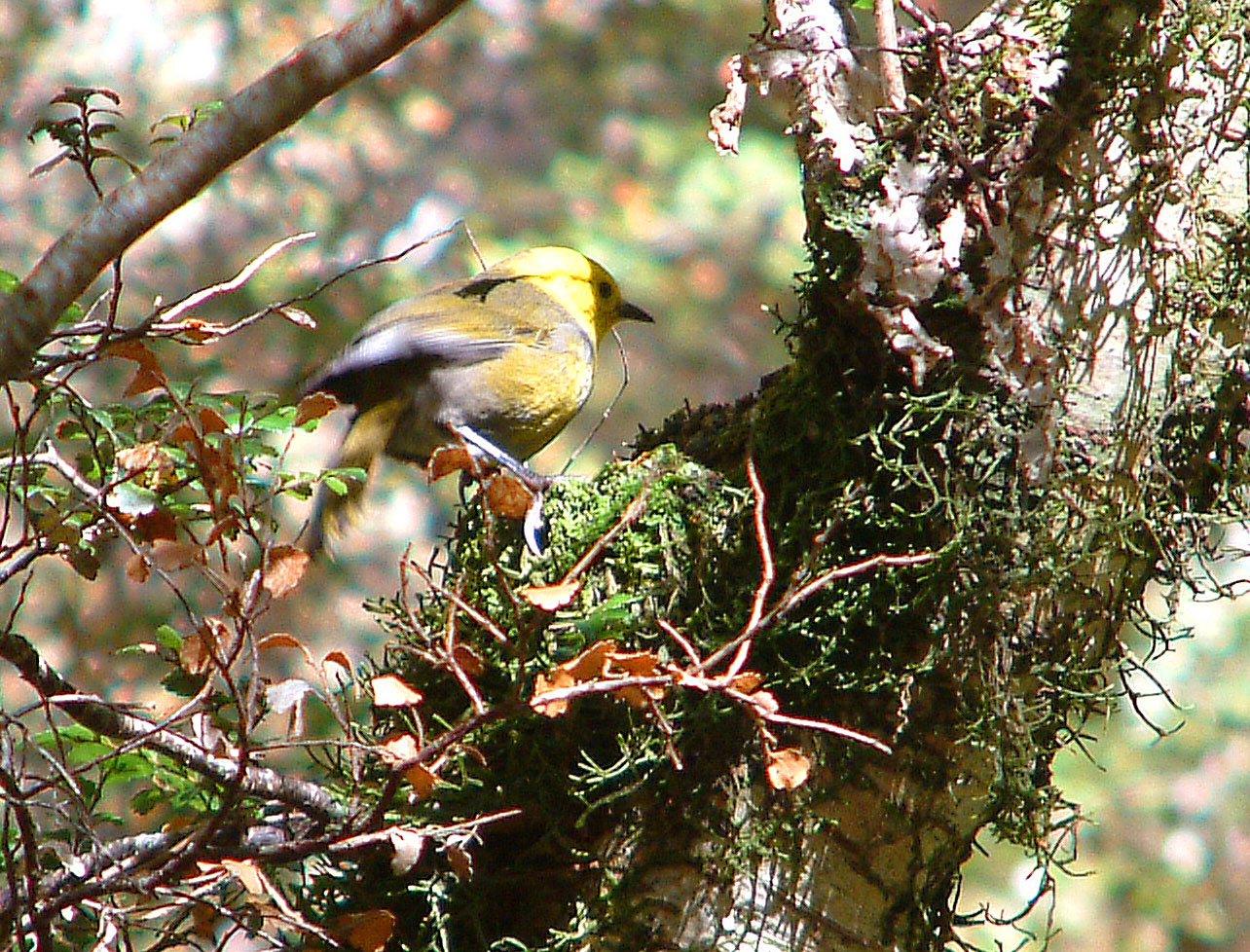
Mōhua (yellowhead)

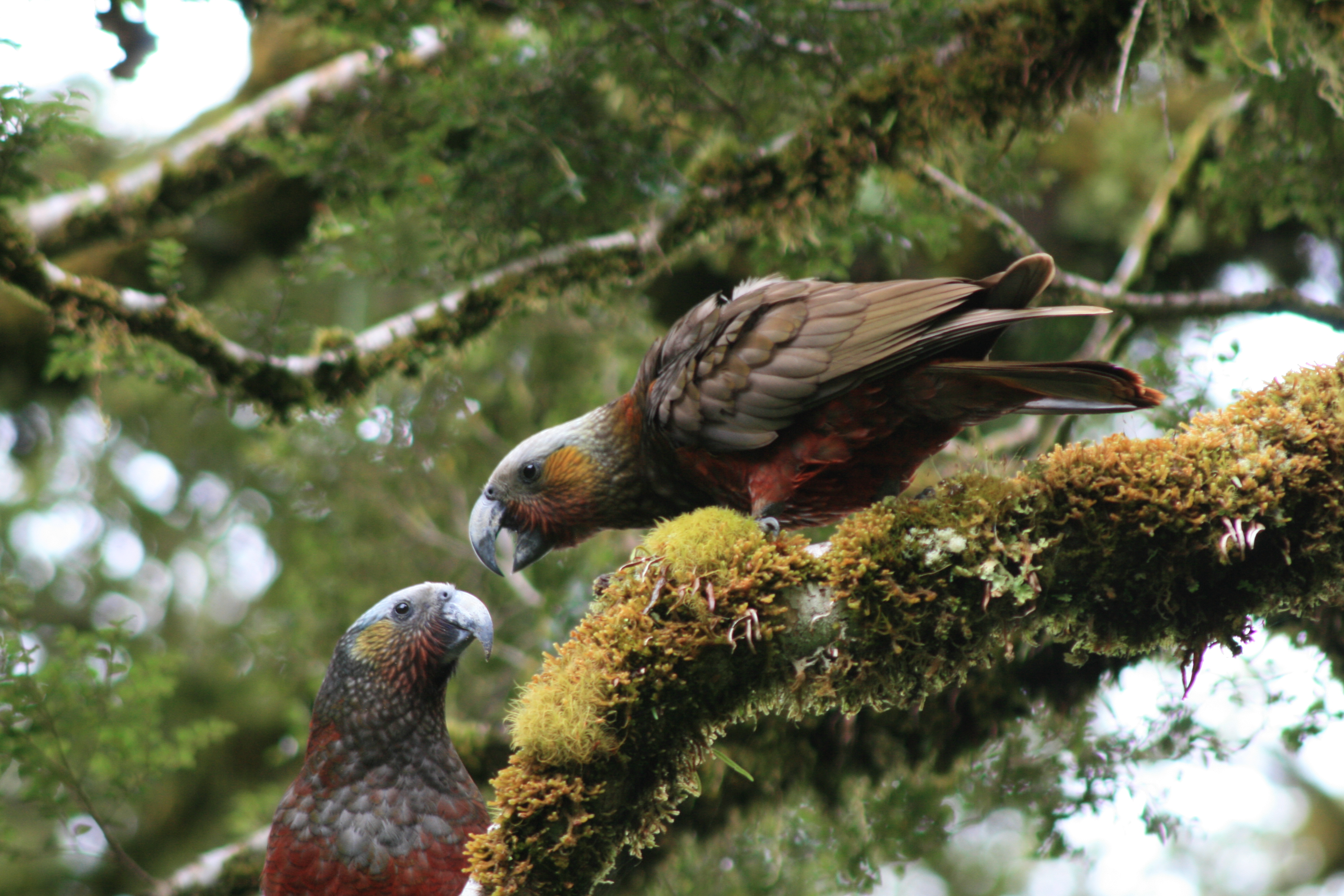
South Island kākā

== See also ==
- Greenstone and Caples Tracks
- Routeburn Classic
