= Routeburn River =

Routeburn River Route Burn
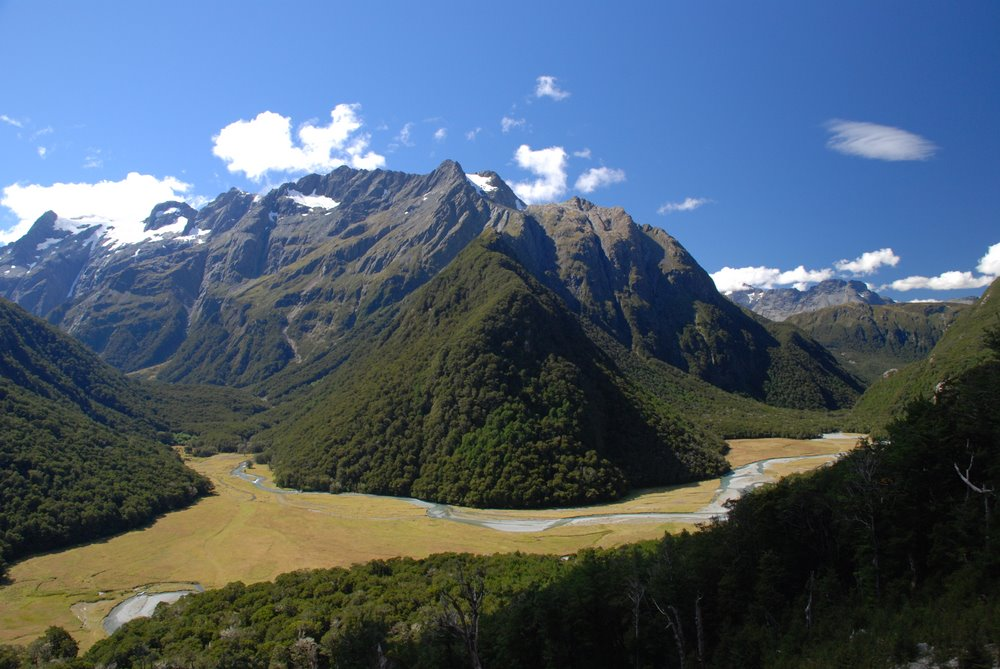
- The Route Burn River winds around the Humboldt Range
- Route of the Route Burn
- Mouth of the Route Burn Routeburn River (New Zealand)
- Native name: Te Komama (Māori)

Location
- Country: New Zealand
- Region: Otago
- District: Queenstown-Lakes

Physical characteristics
- Source: Route Burn Left Branch
  - location: Lake Wilson
  - coordinates: 44.72946°S 168.17853°E
  - elevation: 1,434 m (4,705 ft)
- 2nd source: Route Burn North Branch
  - coordinates: 44.6584°S 168.1985°E
- Mouth
  - location: Dart River / Te Awa Whakatipu
  - coordinates: 44°44′04″S 168°19′30″E

Basin features
- Progression: Route Burn → Dart River / Te Awa Whakatipu → Lake Wakatipu → Kawarau River → Lake Dunstan → Clutha River / Mata-Au → Pacific Ocean
- Tributaries
  - left: Sugar Loaf Stream
  - right: Double Barrel Creek
- Waterfalls: Routeburn Falls

The Routeburn River, also known as the Route Burn, is a river in New Zealand. It is a short stony river that flows for some 15 kilometres into the Dart River / Te Awa Whakatipu in the South Island. The Routeburn River flows alongside a section of the Routeburn Track. The upper reaches of the river are found in the Routeburn North Branch and leave the Routeburn Track around the Routeburn Flat Hut area.

The river has two main branches of similar length, which meet some 8 kilometres from the Dart. Both of these streams have sources in the Humboldt Range. One of these streams flows due south from the slopes of the 1960-metre Nereus Peak; the other flows south then east from Lake Wilson, a small tarn, passing through Lake Harris and over the Routeburn Falls. Several smaller streams join the river from the south closer to its entry into the Dart River.

== Gallery ==
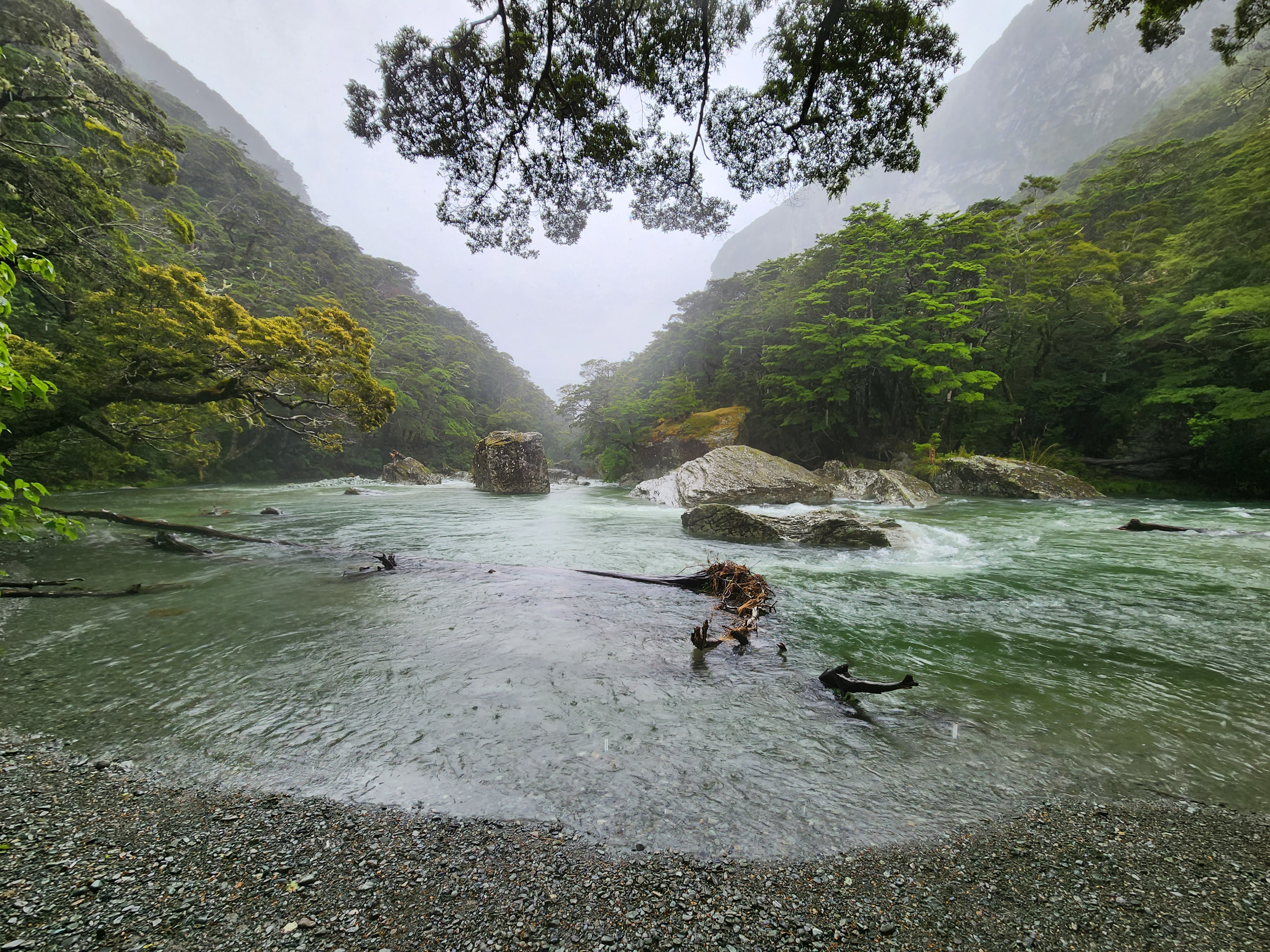
Forge Flat on the lower Route Burn

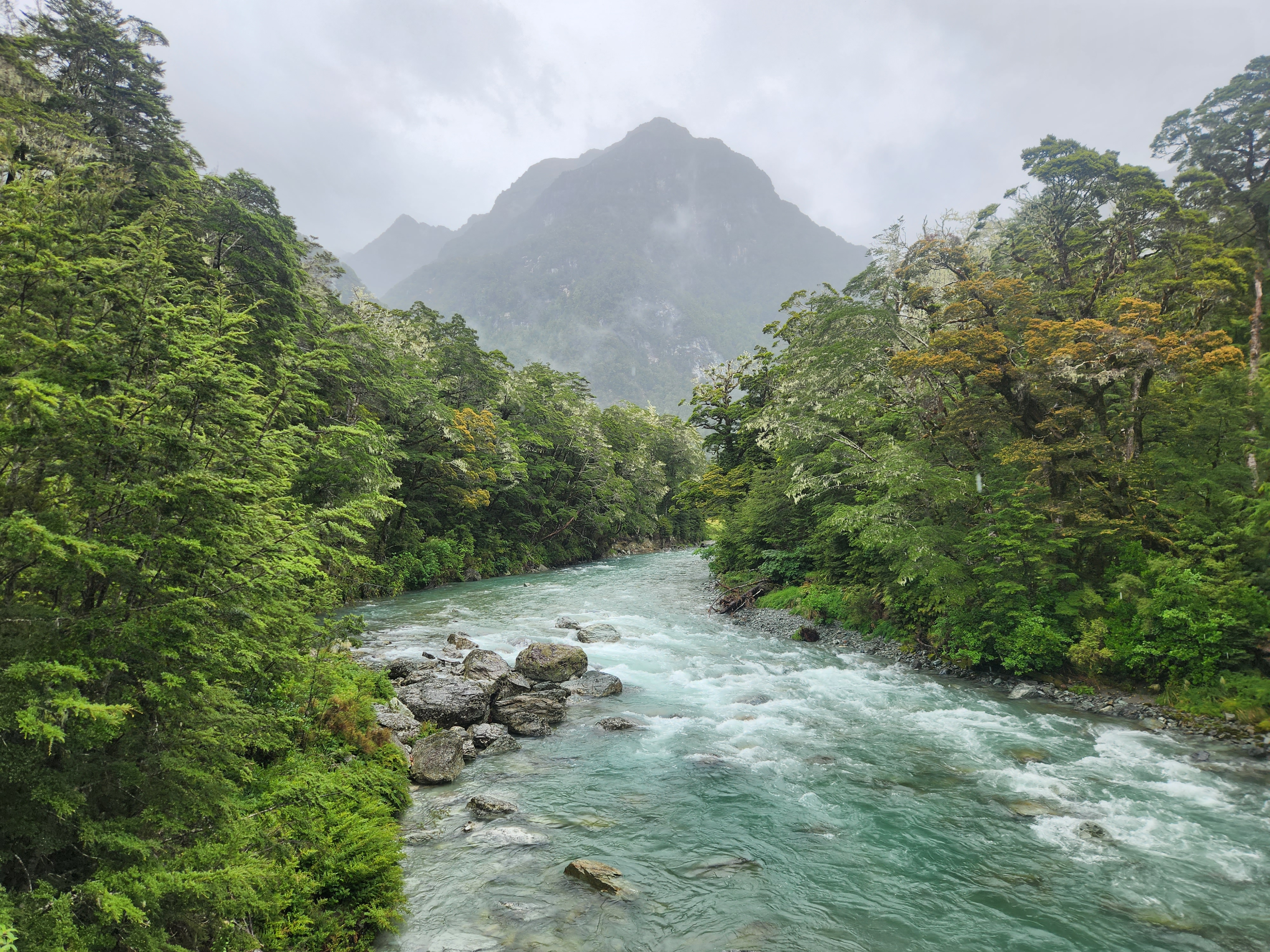
The Route Burn seen near Routeburn Shelter

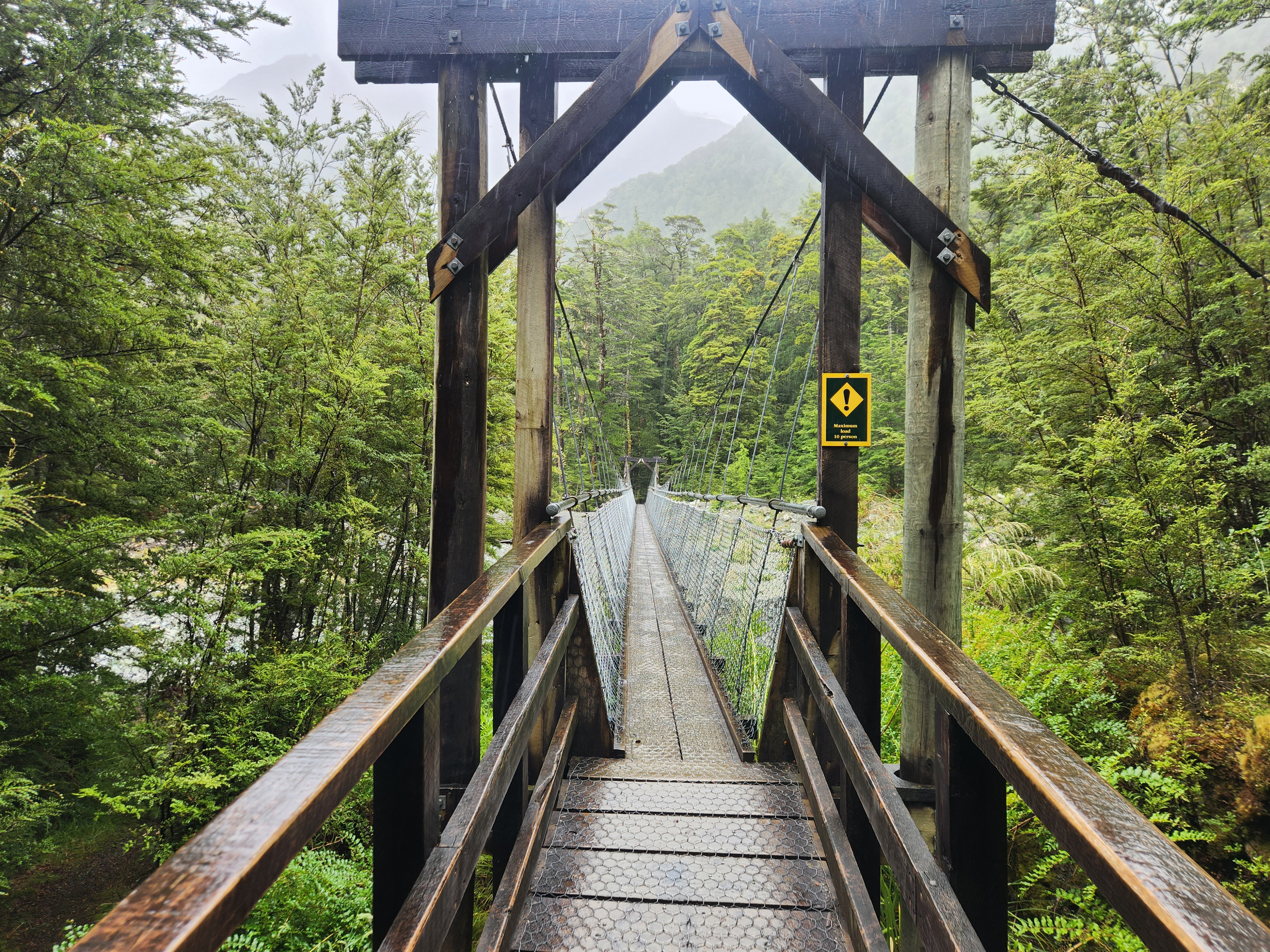
Swing bridge over the Sugar Loaf Stream, a tributary of the Route Burn

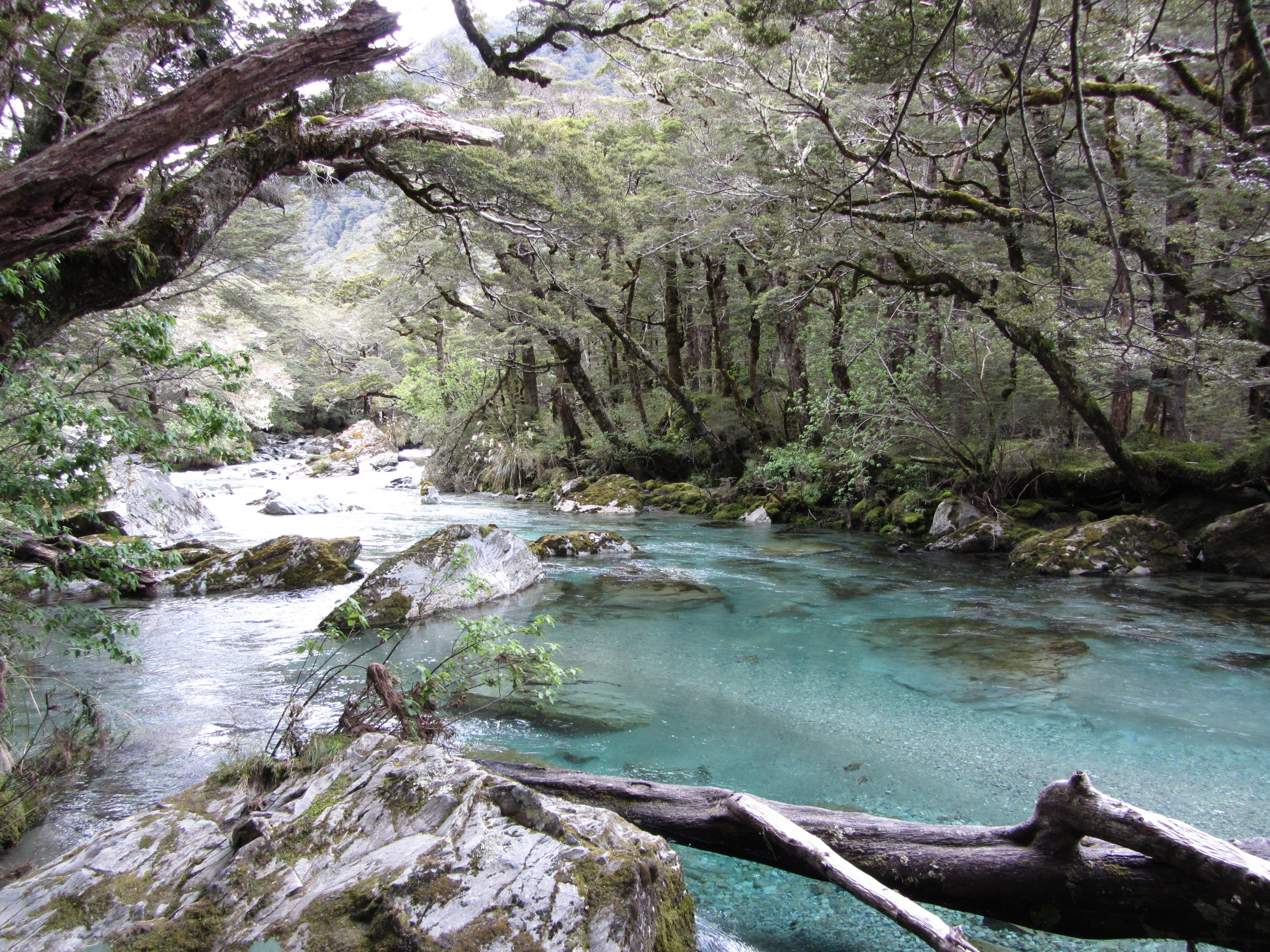
The lower Route Burn

== See also ==
- List of rivers of New Zealand
