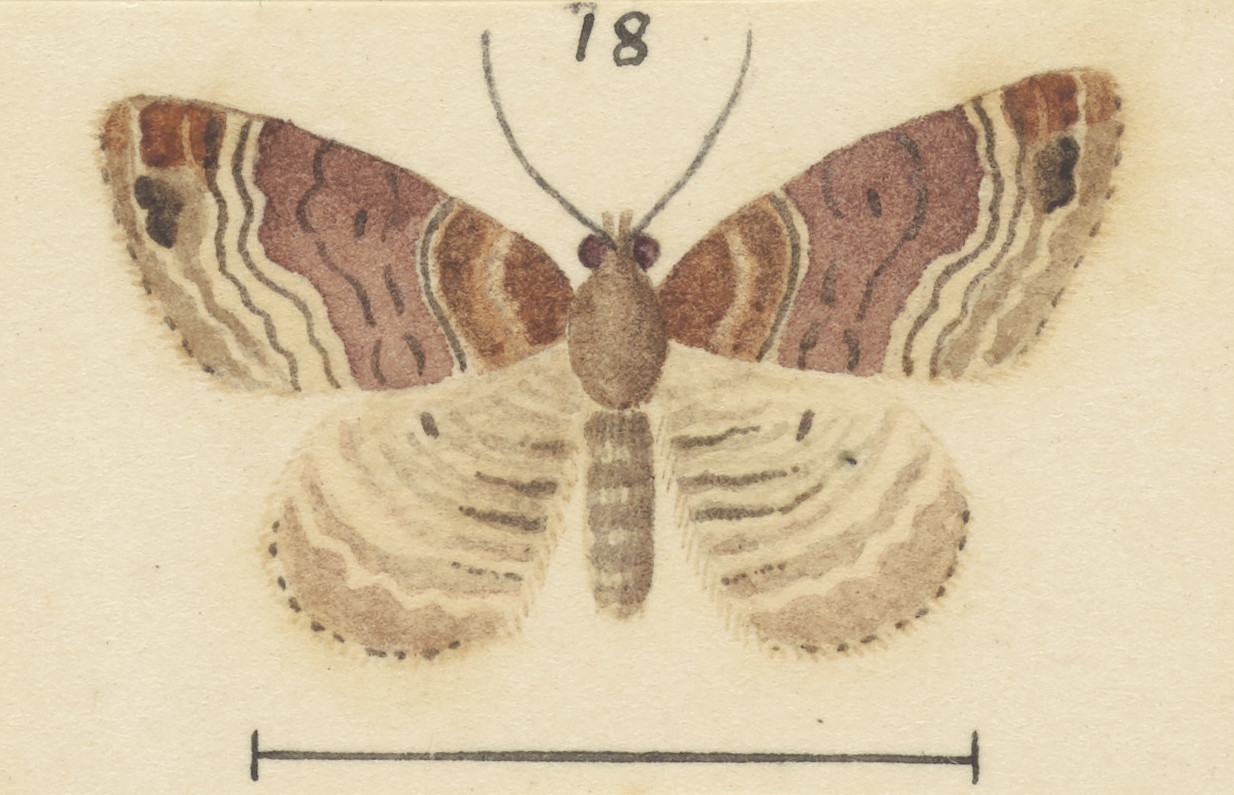
- Illustration of female by George Hudson

Conservation status
- Data Deficit (NZ TCS)

Scientific classification
- Kingdom: Animalia
- Phylum: Arthropoda
- Clade: Pancrustacea
- Class: Insecta
- Order: Lepidoptera
- Family: Geometridae
- Genus: Hydriomena
- Species: H. iolanthe

Binomial name
- Hydriomena iolanthe Hudson, 1939

Synonyms
- Xanthorhoe iolanthe Hudson, 1939

= Hydriomena iolanthe =

Species of moth

Hydriomena iolanthe is a species of moth in the family Geometridae. It is indigenous to New Zealand. This species is based on a single specimen that is now lost and has not been matched to any known species. In 2025 this species was classified as "data deficient" under the New Zealand Threat Classification System and is regarded as taxonomically unresolved.

== Taxonomy ==
This species was first described by George Hudson in 1939 using a female specimen collected at Lake Harris by F. S. Oliver in January 1918. Due to the single specimen being damaged and lacking antennae, Hudson was uncertain of the generic position of the species. He therefore named the species Hydriomena (or Xanthorhoe) iolanthe. The illustration is labelled Hydriomena? iolanthe. The classification of New Zealand endemic moths within the genus Hydriomena is regarded as unsatisfactory and in need of revision. As such this species is currently also known as Hydriomena (s.l.) iolanthe. This species may prove synonymous as the holotype specimen has been lost, and it is possible it is a European species that was mislabelled. It was listed in the New Zealand Inventory of Biodiversity as nomen dubium.

== Description ==
Hudson described the species as follows:

The expansion of the wings is 7/8 inch (22 mm.). The forewings have the apex rather obtuse and the termen slightly oblique; there is a deep reddish-brown basal patch followed by a rather indistinct pale transverse line; the subbasal area is orange-brown, followed by a narrow whitish-ochreous band from 1/4 of costa to 1/3 of dorsum; this band is abruptly bent outwards just below costa and contains a fine blackish line; the median band is dull red, slightly purplish tinged; it contains a small black discal dot and two fine wavy blackish lines enclosing an irregular central area; the outer edge of the median band is finely waved, with slight irregular projections below costa, and a more evident rounded projection in disc; the dorsal third of the median band is much narrower; beyond the median band the ground colour of the wing is pale brownish-ochreous; there are two fine wavy blackish lines immediately outside the median band; a conspicuous yellowish-brown patch on the costa before apex and a blackish-brown patch below this; a very wavy paler subterminal line and a series of minute terminal marks. The hind-wings are dull whitish-ochreous, with numerous pale brownish-ochreous transverse lines and terminal band, some of the lines become blackish towards dorsum; there is a series of minute terminal dots; the cilia of all the wings are dull brownish-ochreous.

== Distribution ==
This species is indigenous to New Zealand. This species is found on the Otago Lakes Fiordland border. It is only known from the type locality of Lake Harris on the Routeburn Track.

== Biology and behaviour ==
This species is on the wing in January.

== Host species ==
It has been hypothesised that the host of the larvae of H. iolanthe is possibly a species of Coprosma. The reasoning behind this hypothesis is that the illustration of the species resembles an Austrocidaria and Coprosma plants are the host for species in that genus.

== Conservation status ==
In 2025 this species was classified by the New Zealand Department of Conservation as "data deficient" under the New Zealand Threat Classification System. Hudson's description was based on a single specimen which is now lost. The illustration by Hudson has not been matched to any known endemic or adventive species.
