= Bridal Veil Creek =

Bridal Veil Creek may refer to:

- Bridal Veil Creek (Telluride), of Bridal Veil Falls (Telluride), above Telluride, Colorado
- Bridal Veil Creek (Oregon), of Bridal Veil Falls (Oregon)

== See also ==
- Bridal Veil Falls (disambiguation)
