= Bridal Veil Falls (Routeburn, Otago) =

Bridal Veil Falls (Otago-Route Burn)
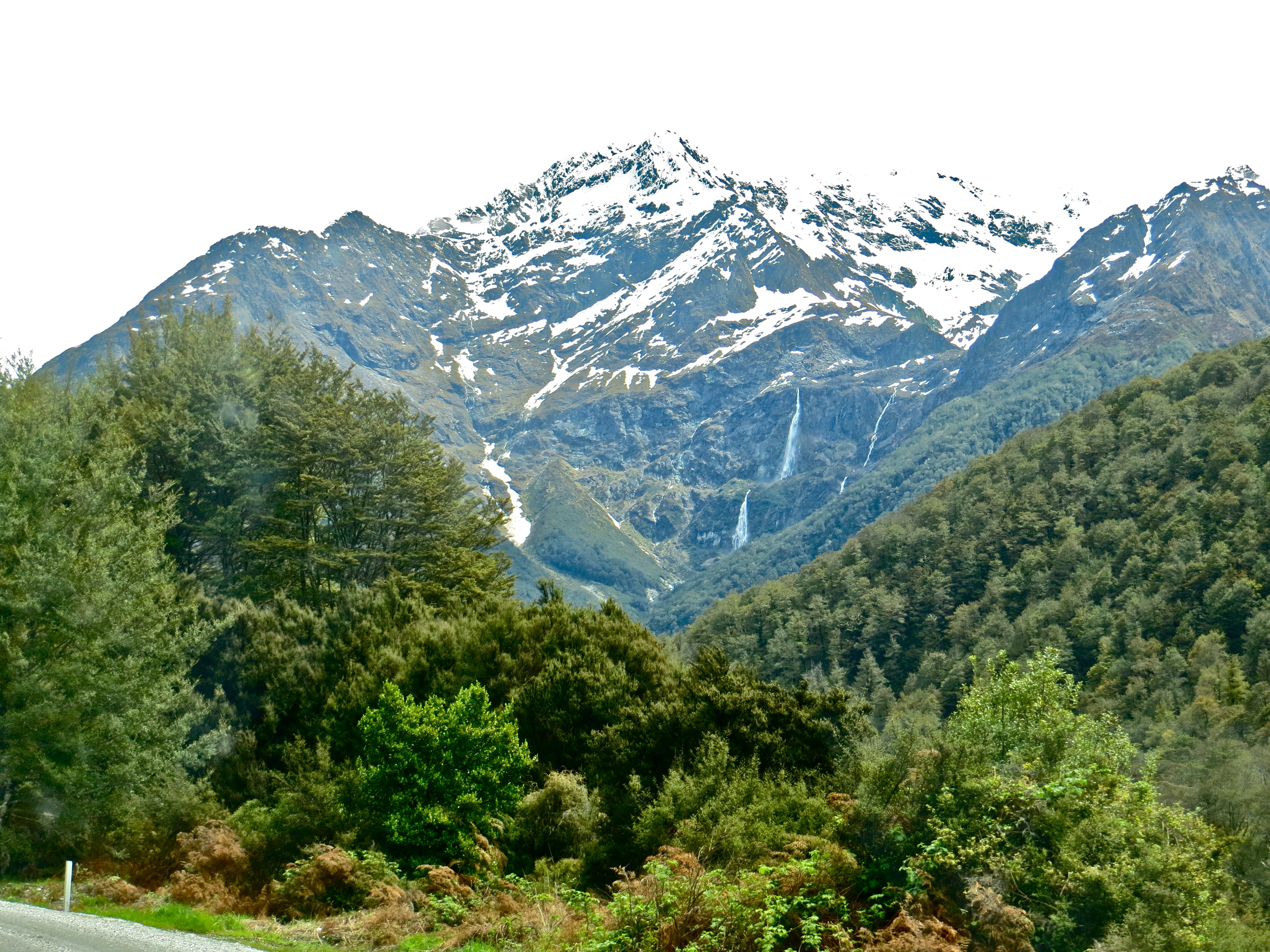
- Bridal Veil as seen from the road to the Routeburn Track.
- Interactive map of Bridal Veil Falls (Otago-Route Burn)
- Location: Queenstown-Lakes District, New Zealand
- Coordinates: 44°42′06″S 168°14′50″E
- Type: Plunge
- Total height: 57 metres (187 ft)

The Bridal Veil Falls is a waterfall near Queenstown, Otago, in New Zealand. It is one of numerous streams and waterfalls in this region. This fall is only notable because it has been given a common name (Bridal Veil Falls), is clearly visible from the road and the stream from this fall runs under the third bridge of the Routeburn Track. This fall is over Torlesse Terrane metamorphic rock.
