= Mount Gunn (New Zealand) =

Mountain in New Zealand

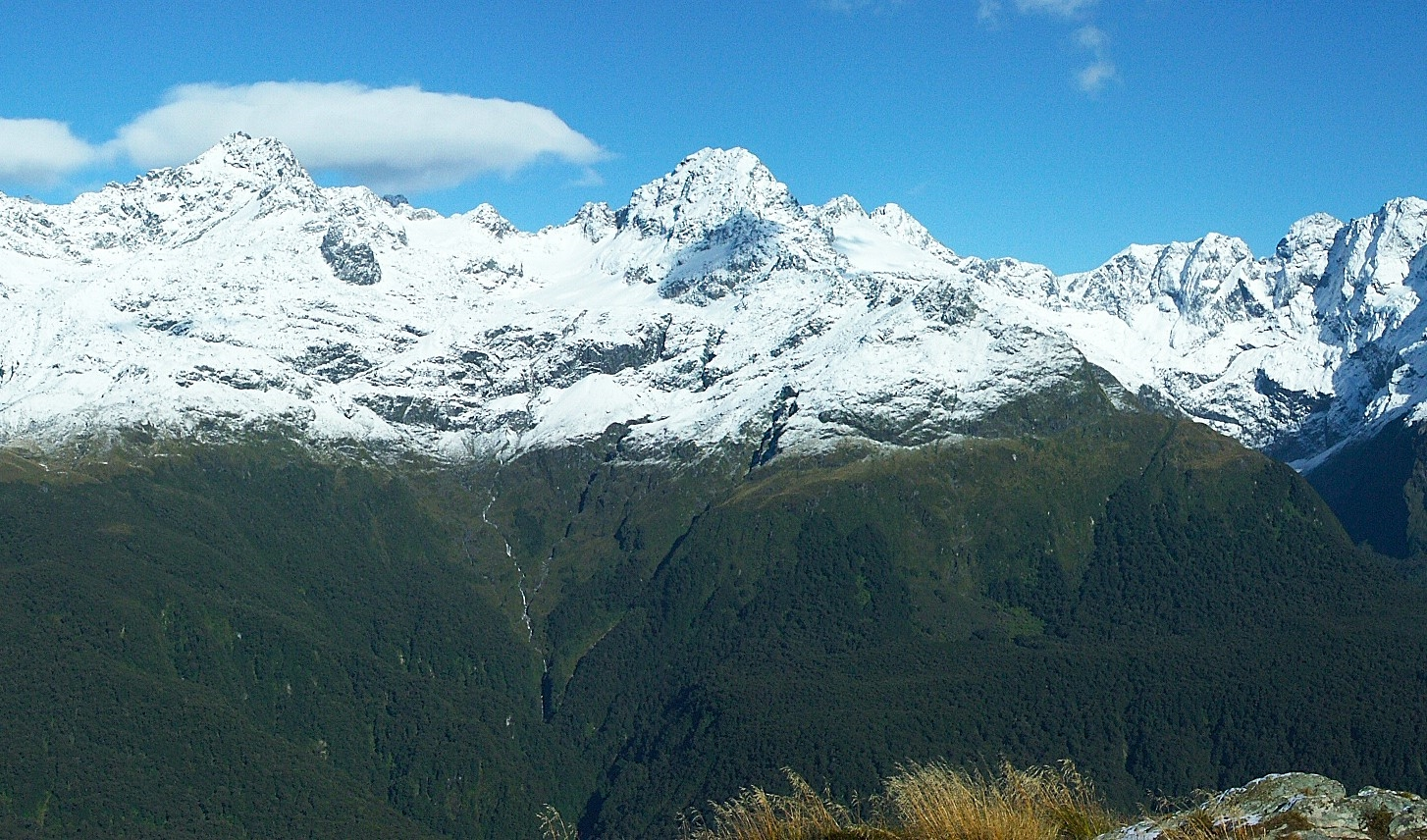
- East aspect

Highest point
- Elevation: 2,044 m (6,706 ft)
- Prominence: 164 m (538 ft)
- Isolation: 1.55 km (0.96 mi)
- Coordinates: 44°45′18″S 168°05′02″E

Naming
- Etymology: Davey Gunn

Geography
- Location within New Zealand
- Interactive map of Mount Gunn
- Location: South Island
- Country: New Zealand
- Region: Southland
- Protected area: Fiordland National Park
- Parent range: Darran Mountains
- Topo map: NZMS260 D40

Geology
- Rock age: 136 ± 1.9 Ma
- Rock type(s): Gabbronorite, dioritic orthogneiss

Climbing
- First ascent: 1959

Mount Gunn is a 2,044-metre-elevation (6,706-foot) mountain in Southland, New Zealand.

== Description ==
Mount Gunn is part of the Darran Mountains and is situated in the Southland Region of South Island. It is set within Fiordland National Park which is part of the Te Wahipounamu UNESCO World Heritage Site. Precipitation runoff from the mountain drains to the Hollyford River via Marian Creek and Caples Creek. Topographic relief is significant as the summit rises 1,900 metres (6,234 feet) above the Hollyford Valley in four kilometres and 1,450 metres (4,757 feet) above Caples Creek in two kilometres.

== History ==
The mountain was named after Davey Gunn (1887–1955), promoter of the Hollyford Track. He was a farmer and bushman, running his cattle in the glacier-cut Hollyford Valley. Gunn drowned in the Hollyford River in 1955. The first ascent of the summit was made in 1959 by Bob Cuthill and Denise Schonyan.

== Climate ==
Based on the Köppen climate classification, Mount Gunn is located in a marine west coast climate zone. Prevailing westerly winds blow moist air from the Tasman Sea onto the mountain, where the air is forced upward by the mountains (orographic lift), causing moisture to drop in the form of rain and snow. This climate supports small unnamed glaciers on the southwest slope. The months of December through February offer the most favourable weather for viewing or climbing this peak.

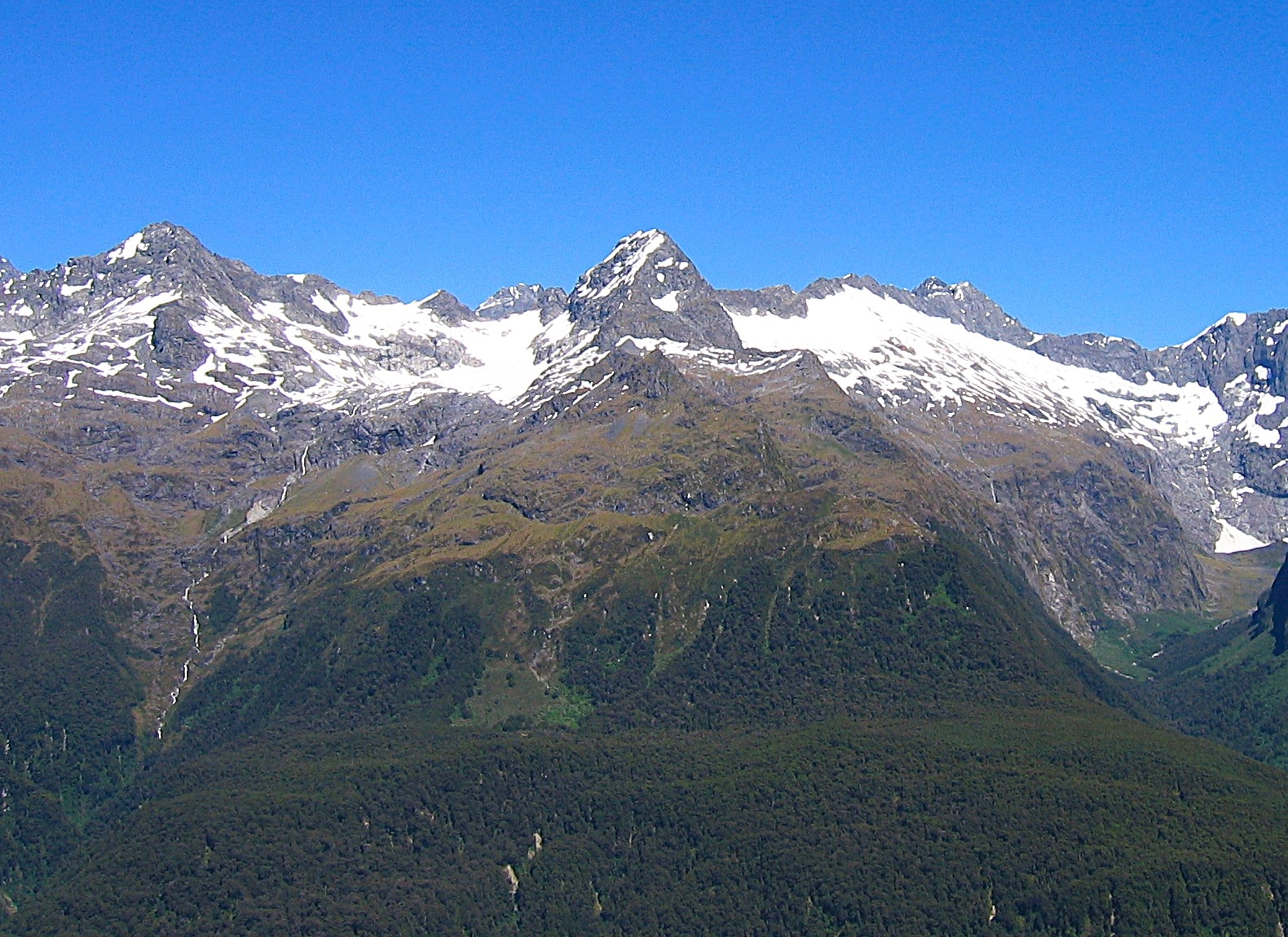
Mount Gunn centred

== See also ==
- List of mountains of New Zealand by height
- Fiordland
