= Bridal Veil Falls =

Bridal Veil Falls, Bridalveil Falls or Bridalveil Fall is a frequently used name for waterfalls that observers fancy resemble a bride's veil:

== Australia ==
- Bridal Veil Falls, Leura, in the Blue Mountains National Park, New South Wales
- Govetts Leap Falls, also called the Bridal Veil Falls, in the Blue Mountains National Park, New South Wales

== Canada ==
- Bridal Veil Falls (Banff), Banff National Park, Alberta
- Bridal Veil Falls, in Bridal Veil Falls Provincial Park, Fraser Valley, British Columbia
- Bridal Veil Falls (Manitoulin Island), Kagawong River, Manitoulin Island, Ontario

== France, Reunion (Indian Ocean) ==
- Bridal Veil Falls (Salazie)
- Bridal Veil Falls (Le Tampon), Le Tampon

== New Zealand ==
- Bridal Veil Falls (Waikato), Waikato, North Island
- Bridal Veil Falls (Rotorua), a geothermal formation in Waiotapu, near Rotorua, North Island
- Bridal Veil Falls (Canterbury), Arthur's Pass National Park, South Island
- Bridal Veil Falls (Hawke's Bay), Hawke's Bay, North Island
- Bridal Veil Falls (Skippers Canyon, Otago), Skippers Canyon, Central Otago, South Island
- Bridal Veil Falls (Routeburn, Otago), Routeburn, Queenstown-Lakes District, South Island

== Norway ==
- Bridal Veil Falls (Geirangerfjord), Geirangerfjord

== Peru ==
- Catarata Velo de la Novia, Chanchamayo Province

== Philippines ==
- Bridal Veil Falls (Iligan City), Iligan City
- Bridal Veil Falls (Tuba, Benguet), seen from Kennon Road in Tuba, Benguet

== Portugal ==
- Cascata do Véu da Noiva, Madeira

== South Africa ==
- Bridal Veil Falls (Sabie), Mpumalanga

== United States ==
=== Alaska ===
- Bridal Veil Falls (Skagway, Alaska), in Skagway
- Bridal Veil Falls (Valdez-Cordova Census Area, Alaska), in Keystone Canyon, flowing into the Lowe River

=== Arkansas ===
- Bridal Veil Falls (Arkansas), in Cleburne County outside of Heber Springs

=== California ===
- Bridalveil Fall, in Yosemite National Park
- Bridal Veil Falls (Eldorado), in Eldorado National Forest

=== Colorado ===
- Bridal Veil Falls (Colorado Springs), in Colorado Springs
- Bridal Veil Falls (Glenwood Springs), in Glenwood Springs
- Bridal Veil Falls (Idaho Springs), in Idaho Springs
- Bridal Veil Falls (Rocky Mountain National Park), in Rocky Mountain National Park
- Bridal Veil Falls (Telluride), in Telluride

=== Kentucky ===
- Bridal Veil Falls (Kentucky), a subterranean waterfall in Mammoth Cave National Park

=== Michigan ===
- Bridalveil Falls (Michigan) at Pictured Rocks National Lakeshore

=== Minnesota ===
- Bridal Veil Falls (Minneapolis)

=== New Hampshire ===
- Bridal Veil Falls (New Hampshire), in Franconia

=== New York ===
- Bridal Veil Falls (Catskill Mountains), in the Catskill Mountains
- Bridal Veil Falls (Niagara Falls), one of the Niagara Falls
- Bridal Veil Falls (Plattekill Creek), in the Catskill Mountains

=== North Carolina ===
- Bridal Veil Falls (DuPont State Forest), in DuPont State Forest
- Bridal Veil Falls (Macon County), in Highlands

=== Ohio ===
- Bridal Veil Falls (Ohio), in Bedford

=== Oregon ===
- Bridal Veil Falls (Oregon), in Bridal Veil Falls State Park

=== Pennsylvania ===
- Bridal Veil Falls (Pennsylvania), in Bushkill Falls

=== South Dakota ===
- Bridal Veil Falls (South Dakota), in Spearfish

=== Tennessee ===
- Bridal Veil Falls (Tennessee), in Monteagle
- Bridal Veil Falls (University of the South), at the University of the South Sewanee campus

=== Utah ===
- Bridal Veil Falls (Utah), in Provo Canyon, Utah County

=== Washington ===
- Bridal Veil Falls (Washington), in Gold Bar

== Zimbabwe ==
- Bridal Veil Falls (Chimanimani)
