= Bridal Veil Falls (Arkansas) =

Waterfall in Arkansas, U.S.

Coordinates: 35.4695236°N 92.0384821°W

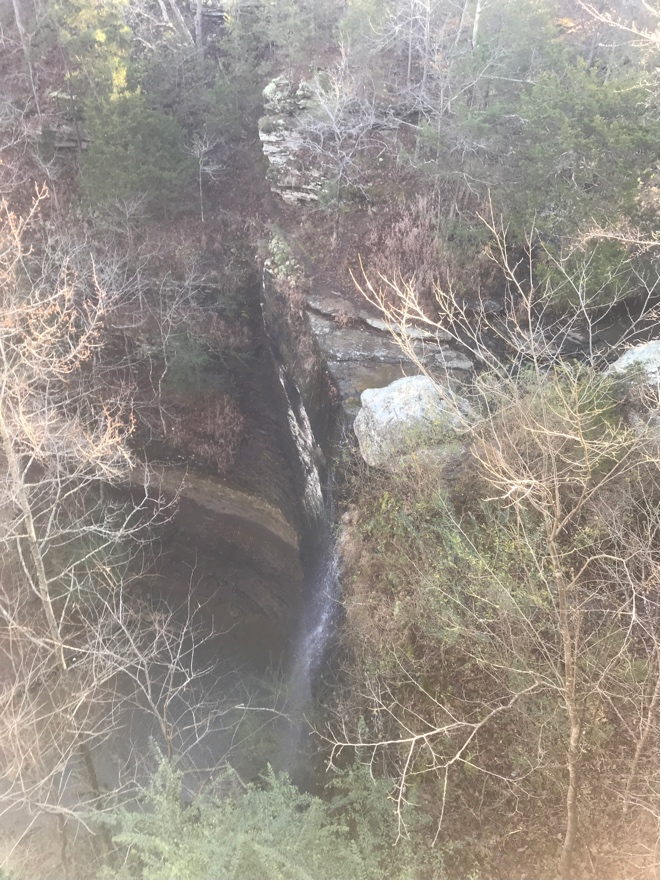
Bridal Veil Falls, as seen above from the viewing platform

Bridal Veil Falls is a natural waterfall, located in Cleburne County, Arkansas, outside of Heber Springs.

It is actually two falls in close proximity leading some to refer to one as Bridal Veil Falls, and the other as Cornelius Falls for the first owner of the property, John H. Cornelius, which was the original name for both. Cornelius originally obtained the property where the falls are located in 1894 through the US Homestead Act of 1862. The Cornelius family retained ownership until around 1903. The property continued to be privately owned but freely used by the public for many years. It was acquired by the Young Business Men's club of Heber Springs in the 1980s, and officially made available for public use. The Heber Springs City Parks and Recreation Department negotiated an agreement in 2012 with the YBMV to improve and maintain the falls and surrounding area for the public. The Rotary Club of Cleburne County sponsored a community improvement project to create the parking lot, short trail, and viewing platform.

== Links ==
- Entry at Alltrails.com
- Only In Arkansas Page
- Hometown Locator Page

== See also ==
- List of waterfalls
