= Davey Gunn =

New Zealand businessman (1887–1955)

- Born: David John Gunn; 18 September 1887; Central Otago
- Died: 25 December 1955 (aged 68); Hollyford River
- Known for: Promoting tourism in the Hollyford Valley
- Spouse: Ethel May Willetts
- Children: 3

David John Gunn (18 September 1887 – 25 December 1955) was a New Zealander and promoter of the Hollyford Track. A farmer and bushman, he ran his almost wild cattle in the glacier-cut Hollyford Valley in Fiordland, South Westland, New Zealand.

== Biography ==
Gunn was the fourth of five children of Scottish parents, Isabella Grierson Robertson and her husband, Alexander Gunn. A one-time shepherd, Alexander Gunn ran a sheep farm of 27,000 acres in Central Otago. For secondary schooling David lived at Hook, near Waimate, with his maiden aunts on their 500-acre farm. Leaving school, he briefly followed other family members into Dalgety's (an agricultural company), working as a clerk in a branch office before deciding the work did not suit him. He went back to work on and later manage the farm at Hook. He underwent military training at Trentham Military Camp in 1918, but was too late to be sent to fight in the First World War.

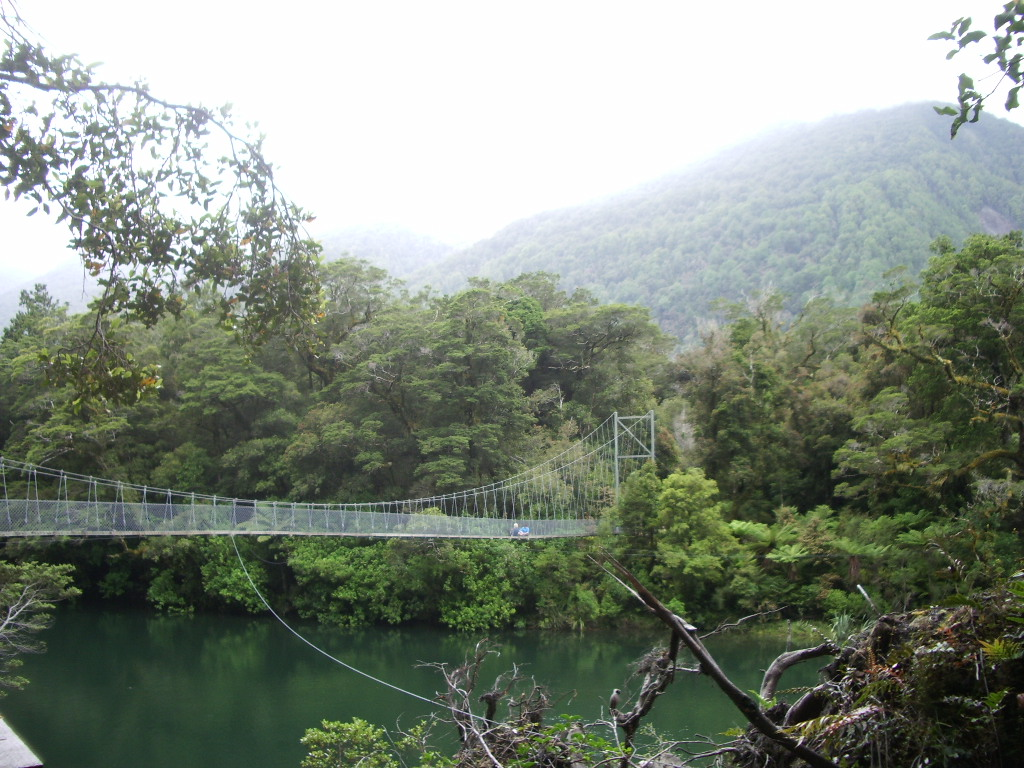
A bridge on Gunn's Hollyford Track

He went farming on his own account 100 miles south of Waimate at Sutton. On 10 July 1919 at Morven near Waimate he married Ethel May Willetts, a confectioner. They were to have two daughters, Isabel and Dorothy, and a son, Murray. His wife took their children to Oamaru to be educated and Gunn returned to his family for brief visits only twice a year.

George Gunn, an early runholder, mapped some of the Hollyford Valley in 1861. In 1926 David Gunn bought freehold land there from remaining original settlers, the McKenzie family. He increased his Hollyford landholding in 1929, just before the onset of the Great Depression, by acquiring four leases totalling more than 25,000 acres. He then moved to the valley, establishing his solitary base at Deadman's Hut on the banks of the Hollyford River. Gunn cut a number of well used tracks and erected huts in the more remote parts of his run.

== Fox Moth crash ==
Gunn came to public attention on 30 December 1936 with a speedy journey to assist the injured passengers of a de Havilland Fox Moth cabin plane he had seen crash into the sea at Big Bay. He covered the 90 km (56 mi), four-day journey in just 21 hours, a feat which earned him a King George VI Coronation Medal the following year.

== Hollyford Track and tourism ==
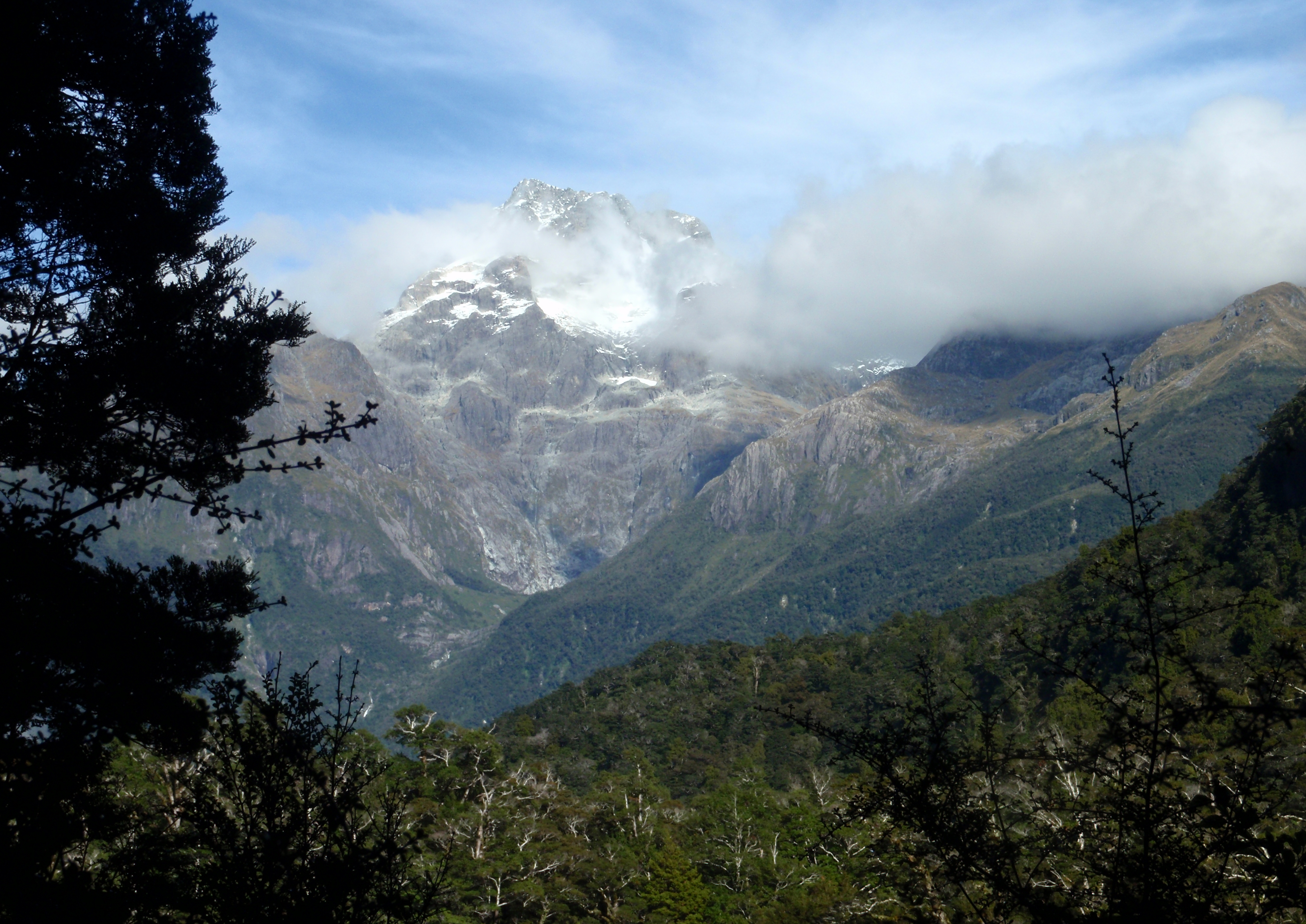
Mount Madeline, Hollyford Track

In 1936, Gunn began guiding tramping parties down his Hollyford Track, and would continue doing so until his death in 1955. Gunn became a well-known and popular figure. He was respected for his bushcraft, his energy, and his knowledge of the area.

On Christmas Day 1955, Gunn was fording the Hollyford River on horseback near Hidden Falls, with a 12-year-old boy mounted behind him. The horse stumbled and fell, and both riders were seen to find their feet in the river, until the horse stood up and they were both swept away and drowned. Gunn's body was never found.

After his death his son, Murray, continued to guide trampers in the area, and started "Gunn's Camp", a rest-stop for trampers with store and small museum, which still stands near the southern end of the track, around from the Milford Sound-Te Anau highway.

== Legacy ==
Mount Gunn in the Hollyford Valley is named after him.
