= Lake Harris (New Zealand) =

Small alpine lake in the South Island of New Zealand

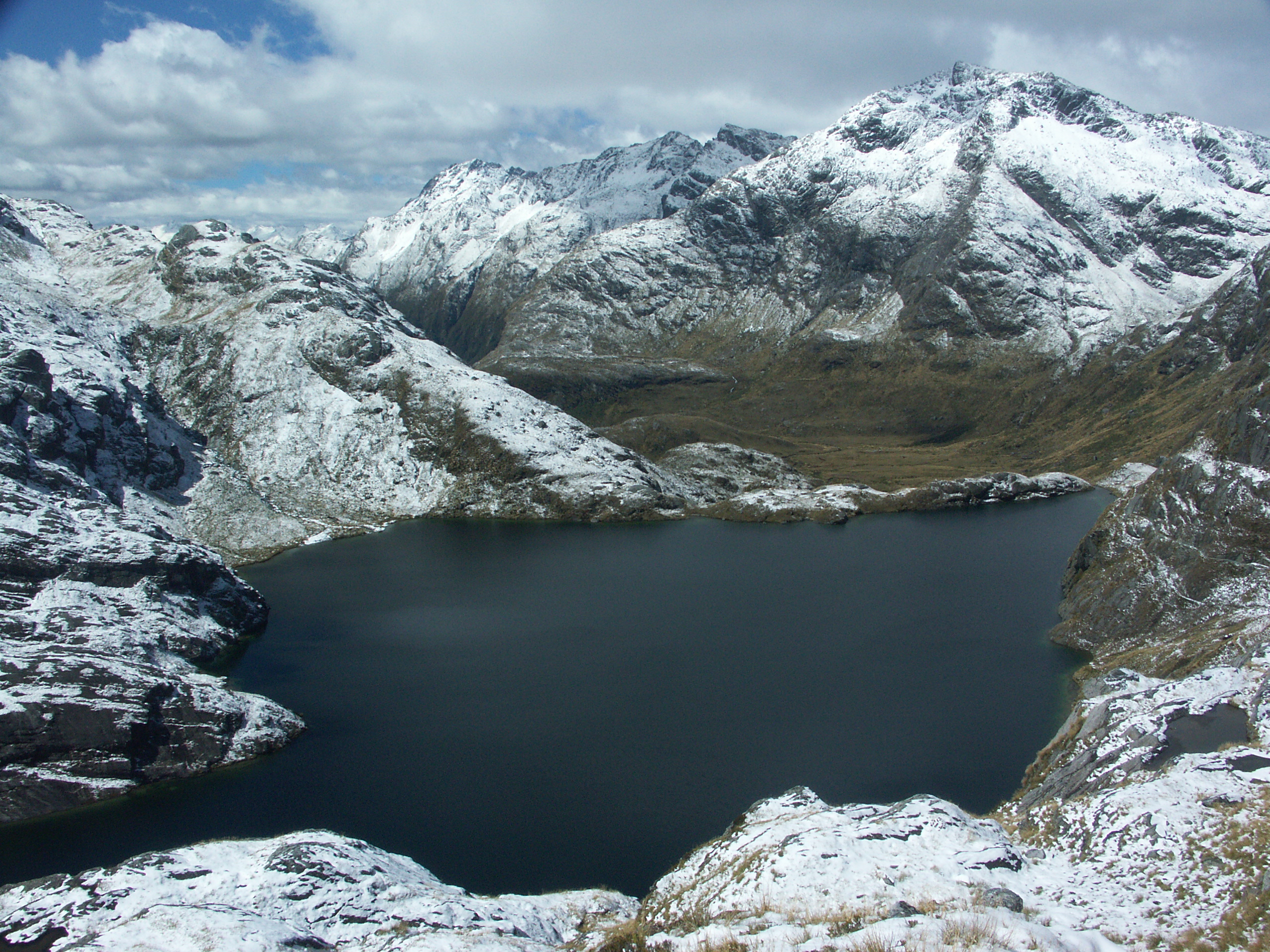
- Lake Harris after snow

- Location within South Island
- Location: Routeburn Track, South Island
- Coordinates: 44°43′30.79″S 168°10′35.63″E
- Basin countries: New Zealand

Lake Harris is a small alpine lake near the Harris Saddle on the Routeburn Track in the South Island of New Zealand.

== Biodiversity ==
Lake Harris is the type locality for the data deficient moth Hydriomena iolanthe. This moth is known only from a single specimen which is now lost.
