= Purves =

Purves is a surname of British origin, which is a variant of Purvis. It is an occupational surname meaning the person responsible for obtaining supplies for a household or monastery, derived from the Middle English purveys (meaning "provisions" or "supplies"), from the Old French porveoir ("to provide, supply").

Notable people with this surname include:

- Andrew Purves (born 1946), British theologian
- Austin M. Purves Jr. (1900–1977), American multi-media artist
- Barry Purves (born 1960), British animator and filmmaker
- Bill Purves (born 1870), Irish footballer
- Cec Purves (born 1933), Canadian politician
- Charlie Purves (1921–2013), English footballer
- Christopher Purves (born 1961), British opera singer
- Dale Purves (born 1938), American neuroscientist
- Daphne Purves (1908–2008), New Zealand educator
- David Purves (1924–2015), Scottish environmental scientist, playwright, poet and champion of the Scots language
- Della Purves (1945–2008), British botanical artist
- Edmund R. Purves (1897–1964), American architect
- Herbert Purves (1908–1993), New Zealand medical researcher
- James Purves (disambiguation)
- Jane Purves (1949–2013), Canadian politician
- Jodie Purves (born 1984), Australian sports administrator, coach and former cricketer
- John Purves (disambiguation)
- John-Clay Purves (1825–1903), British museum curator and geologist
- J. R. W. Purves (1903–1979), Australian lawyer and philatelist
- Laidlaw Purves (1842–1917), Scottish surgeon and golf advocate
- Libby Purves (born 1950), British journalist
- Margaret Purves (1934–2021), British recipient of the Albert Medal, later exchanged for the George Cross
- Peter Purves (born 1939), British television presenter and actor
- Ted Purves (born 1964), American artist
- William Purves (banker) (born 1931), British banker
- William Purves (rugby union) (fl. 1912–1913), Scottish rugby union player

== See also ==
- Parvis
- Purvis
