= Purvis (disambiguation) =

Purvis is a surname and occasionally a given name.

Purvis may also refer to:

== Places ==
- Purvis, Mississippi, a city
  - Purvis High School
- Purvis, Missouri, an unincorporated community
- Purvis Bay, Florida Islands (part of the Solomon Islands)
- Purvis Glacier, Antarctica
- Purvis Peak, Victoria Land, Antarctica
- Cape Purvis, Dundee Island, Antarctica
- Point Purvis, South Georgia Island

== Plays ==
- Purvis, by Denis Johnson

== See also ==
- Purvis bank, a technique used in regenerative agriculture to help prevent soil erosion
- Purvis Eureka, an Australian sports car
- Purves (disambiguation)
- Pervis, a given name and surname
