= Purvis =

Purvis is a surname and occasionally a masculine given name which may refer to:

== Surname ==
- Al Purvis (1929–2009), Canadian ice hockey player
- Arthur Blaikie Purvis (1890–1941), Canadian industrialist
- Bart Purvis (1919–2001), English footballer
- Bob Purvis (disambiguation), several people
- Charles Burleigh Purvis (1842–1929), physician and a co-founder of the medical school at Howard University
- Dawn Purvis (born 1967), member of the Northern Ireland Assembly
- Duane Purvis (c. 1913–1989), All-American football player and track and field athlete
- Edward William Purvis (1857–1888), British officer and Hawaiian official
- Ella Maisy Purvis (born 2003), English actress
- François Pervis (born 1984), French track cyclist
- Gloria Purvis, African American Catholic media commentator, public scholar, whole life activist
- Harriet Forten Purvis (1810–1875), African-American abolitionist and suffragist
- Harriet Purvis, Jr. (1839–1904), African-American abolitionist, suffragist and member of the temperance movement
- Hugh Purvis (1843–1922), United States Marine awarded the Medal of Honor
- Jack Purvis (actor) (1937–1997), British actor
- Jack Purvis (musician) (1906–1962), jazz musician
- James F. Purvis (c. 1808–1880), American slave trader and banker
- Jeff Purvis (born 1959), race car driver
- Jeremy Purvis (born 1974), Scottish Member of Parliament
- Jim Purvis, American soccer player in the 1920s
- Jim Purvis (cricketer) (born 1954), former English cricketer
- John Purvis (disambiguation)
- Katharine Purvis (died 1909), writer of "When the Saints Go Marching in"
- Melvin Purvis (1903–1960), FBI agent
- Neal Purvis (born 1961), screenwriter
- Perrin H. Purvis (1918–2004) American politician
- Richard Purvis (1913–1994), U. S. organist and composer
- Rosalie Purvis (born 1975), Dutch-American theatre director
- Robert Purvis (disambiguation)
- Ryan Purvis (born 1986), National Football League player
- Sarah Louisa Forten Purvis (1814–1883), poet and abolitionist
- Stewart Purvis (born 1947), CEO ITN, British news provider
- T G Purvis (Thomas George; 1861–1933), marine artist
- Tom Purvis (1888–1959), painter, commercial poster artist
- William Purvis (disambiguation)
- Xenobe Purvis (born 1990), British novelist

== Given name ==
- Purvis Short (born 1957), American retired National Basketball Association player
- Purvis Young (1943–2010), African-American painter

== See also ==
- Pervis, a given name and surname
- Purves (surname)
