= Jean Batten =

New Zealand aviator (1909–1982)

Jean Batten CBE
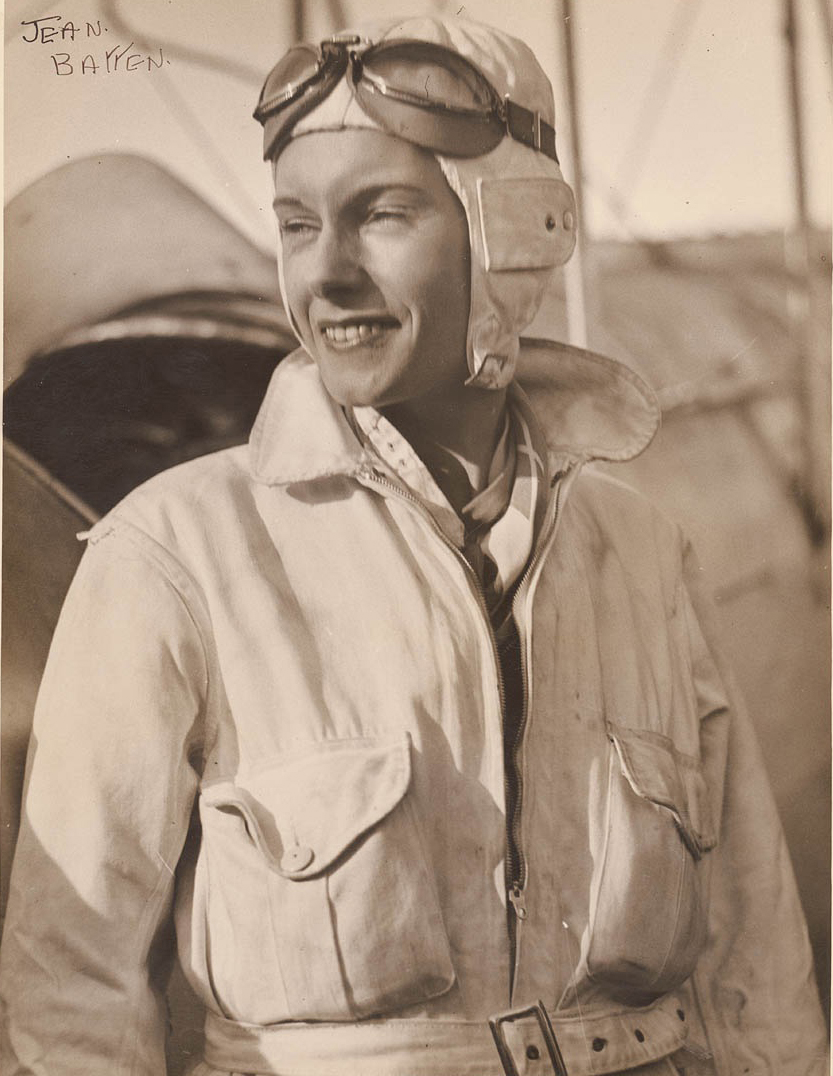
- Batten after her successful England to Australia flight, Mascot, Sydney, 1934
- Born: Jane Gardner Batten; 15 September 1909; Rotorua, New Zealand
- Died: 22 November 1982 (aged 73); Palma, Mallorca, Spain
- Known for: Record-breaking solo flights
- Relatives: John Batten (brother)
- Awards: Commander of the Order of the British Empire; Chevalier de la Légion d'honneur (France); Order of the Southern Cross (Brazil)

Jane Gardner Batten CBE OSC (15 September 1909 – 22 November 1982), commonly known as Jean Batten, was a New Zealand aviator who made several record-breaking flights – including the first solo flight from England to New Zealand in 1936.

She made two unsuccessful attempts to fly from England to Australia solo before achieving the feat in May 1934, taking just under 15 days to fly the distance in a Gipsy Moth biplane. The flight set the record for a woman's solo flight between the two countries. After a publicity tour around Australia and New Zealand, she flew the Gipsy Moth back to England, setting the solo women's record for the return flight from Australia to England. She also became the first woman to fly solo from England to Australia and back again. In November 1935, she set the absolute record of 61 hours, 15 minutes, for flying from England to Brazil. During this flight, in a Percival Gull Six monoplane, she completed the fastest crossing of the South Atlantic Ocean and was the first woman to make the England–South America flight. The pinnacle of her flying achievements came in October 1936, when she flew her Gull from England to New Zealand, covering the distance in a little over 11 days, an absolute record for 44 years. The following year she made her last major flight, flying from Australia to England to set a new solo record.

During the Second World War, Batten unsuccessfully applied to join the Air Transport Auxiliary. Instead, she joined the short-lived Anglo-French Ambulance Corps and worked in the munitions industry. After the war, Batten lived a reclusive and nomadic life with her mother, Ellen Batten, in Europe and the Caribbean. Ellen, a strong personality who dominated her daughter, died at Tenerife in 1967, and soon afterwards Batten returned to public life with several appearances related to aviation and her records. Her death on the Spanish island of Mallorca in November 1982 from complications of a dog bite went unnoticed until discovered by a journalist in September 1987.

== Early life ==
Jane Gardner Batten was born on 15 September 1909 in Rotorua, New Zealand, to Frederick Batten, a dentist, and his wife Ellen née Blackmore. She was the only daughter of the couple, who were both first-generation New Zealanders of English descent. (Note: In later life, Batten would claim that her maternal grandfather served with a British regiment in the New Zealand Wars although there is no evidence to support this. She also claimed her grandfather was related to the author of Lorna Doone.) She had two older brothers and a third who had died soon after birth. Although named for her grandmother, she soon became known as Jean. Being the youngest child as well as sickly, her mother, who had a domineering personality, doted on her. When she was four, the Batten family moved to Auckland.

Commencing her education at a private school, Batten was switched to a state school in 1917. As her father had enlisted in the New Zealand Expeditionary Force (NZEF) to fight in the First World War, the family was on a reduced income. Batten's mother encouraged her in activities considered to be masculine at the time, such as taking her to Kohimarama to observe the flying boats of the flight school there. According to Batten's unpublished memoirs, these visits inspired her to pursue flying. After the war, Fred Batten was discharged from the NZEF and resumed his career as a dentist, moving his family from Devonport, where they had been renting, to Epsom. Her parents' relationship, already brittle due to Fred's extramarital relationships and Ellen's aloofness and reluctance to step back from running the household following her husband's return from the war, ended when the couple separated in 1920. This apparently affected Jean badly, who later vowed she would never get married. In later years Jean would deny her parents' breakup and maintain the marriage was a happy one.

Following the separation of her parents, Batten lived with her mother in Howick; Fred Batten, who lived with his sons near his dental practice on Queen Street, covered some living expenses. In 1922, Jean was sent to Ladies' College, a girls' boarding college in Remuera at her father's expense. Although she later described her time at the school as a happy one, she had few friends and many of her fellow students found her to be aloof. She finished her education in late 1924, refusing to go back the following year for her fifth form year. Instead, she studied music and ballet with an intention of pursuing a career in one of these disciplines. She soon became an assistant teacher at the ballet school where she trained, playing the piano during classes.

In May 1927, Batten read of Charles Lindbergh's exploit in flying non-stop across the Atlantic. This stirred her childhood interest in aviation, which was further agitated in 1928 when the Australian pilot Charles Kingsford Smith flew from Australia to New Zealand in his Southern Cross Fokker F.VII aircraft. Batten's father took her to a reception for Kingsford Smith in Auckland. On meeting him, she declared her intention to learn to fly, which Kingsford Smith considered to be a joke. She was humiliated and supposedly vowed to her mother afterwards that she would indeed fly. She followed this up in 1929 by taking a flight with Kingsford Smith while on a holiday in Sydney. On her return to Auckland, she informed her father of her intention to become a pilot, giving up plans to be a pianist or dancer. He did not approve, believing it an inappropriate career choice for a woman and refused to pay for flying lessons.

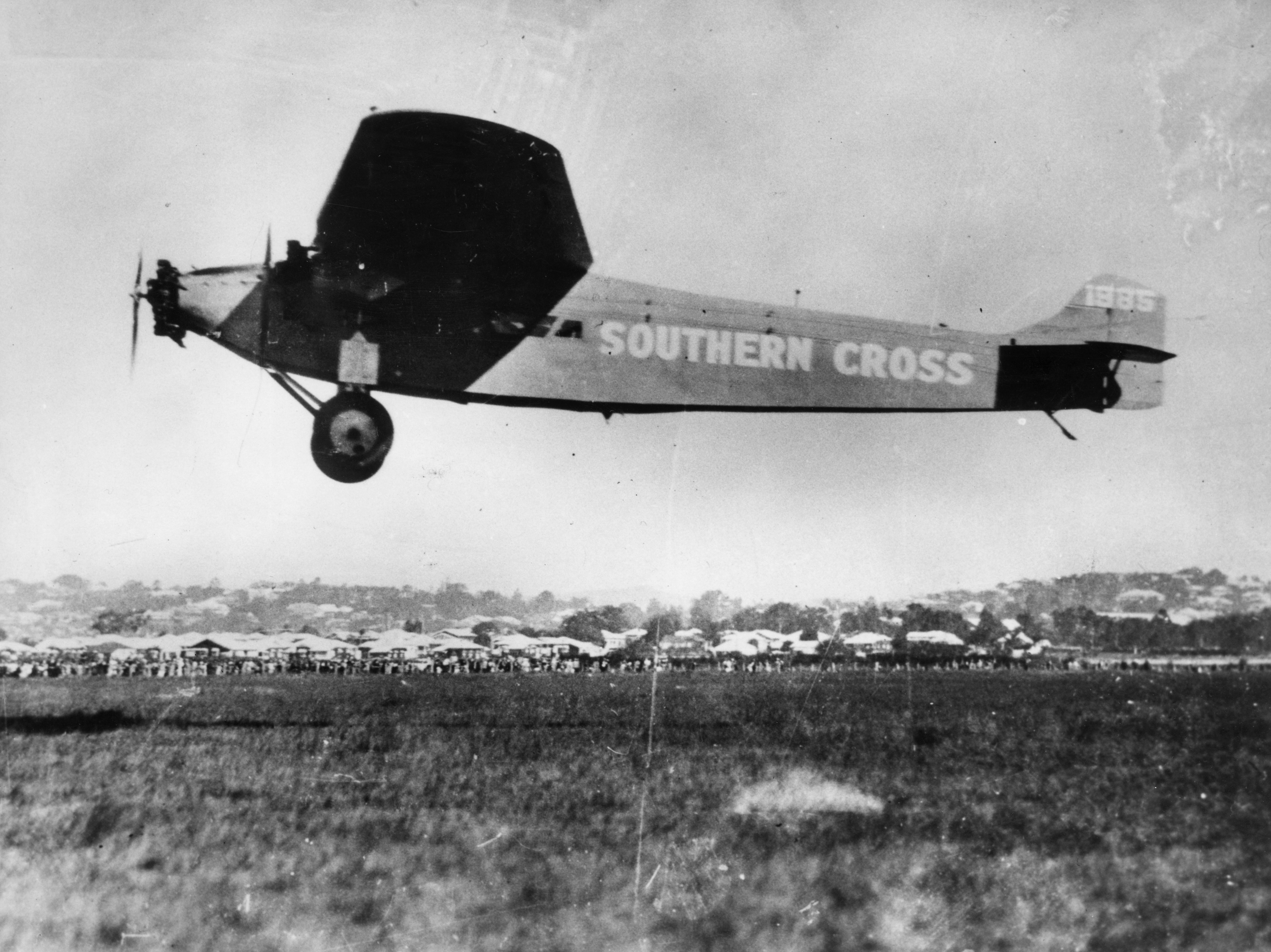
Kingsford Smith's Southern Cross, in 1928

== Flight training ==
Batten, encouraged by her mother, decided to go to England to learn to fly. As a pretext, she told her father that she was going to attend the Royal College of Music, although she later claimed he knew of her real intentions. Batten had a piano which she sold to fund the voyage to England for herself and her mother. In an interview given a few years later to a newspaper, Ellen Batten claimed she had property that was sold to supplement her daughter's funds. (Note: Batten's biographer is sceptical of this claim noting that Batten's brother John did not believe his mother had any property to sell.) Her father provided an allowance to help support her in her supposed musical studies. Batten and her mother left New Zealand in early 1930, travelling to England aboard the RMS Otranto.

On arrival in London in the spring of 1930, the duo found a room on James Street in the city's West End. Although her brother, John Batten, lived in London, working as a film actor with a key role in Under the Greenwood Tree, they saw little of him in case he discovered their true purpose in England and wrote to Batten's father. (Note: John Batten was involved in over 30 feature films as an actor, working in Elstree in England, Hollywood, and Berlin.) She joined the London Aeroplane Club (LAC), which was based at the Stag Lane Aerodrome in the northwest of London. In her unpublished memoirs, Batten wrote that she quickly took to flying and had a "natural aptitude for it". However, other students remembered her as a slow learner. In fact, an early solo flight ended in a crash landing, an incident she never referred to in her later writings. She was also remembered for boasting about planning a solo flight to New Zealand. When, in May, Amy Johnson, who also trained at the LAC, completed the first solo flight for a female pilot from England to Australia in 19 days, Batten sought not only to emulate Johnson but beat her record.

Batten earned her pilot's A licence on 5 December 1930. It had been a relatively protracted process; although only three hours of solo flying were required to qualify for the A licence, Batten could only accumulate the flying time in small amounts. Limited funds prevented extensive flying time and she only flew short flights two or three times a week. It was at this time that her father discovered the true purpose of the trip to England and, angered by the deception, ceased paying her allowance. Despite this, Batten was still determined to beat Johnson's England to Australia record but short of funds, in January 1931 she left with her mother for New Zealand. She hoped that family there would help fund her venture.

On the voyage to New Zealand, Batten met a fellow New Zealander, Flying Officer Fred Truman who was serving with the Royal Air Force (RAF) in British India and going home on leave. The two struck up a friendship. Back in New Zealand, Batten reestablished a relationship with her father, whose anger at being deceived had eased by this time. He began to support her in her flying endeavours, paying for her to take lessons in navigation. Batten resumed flight training, joining the Auckland Aero Club, based at Māngere, and soon secured her New Zealand A pilot's licence. Her friendship with Truman had grown and he fostered hopes of a relationship. He also flew with Batten at the Auckland Aero Club but this soon ended when he had to rejoin his squadron.

== Record attempts from England to Australia ==
Batten still harboured ambitions of an attempt to break the solo England-Australia flight and sought a sponsor to provide the necessary funding. By mid-1931, she decided to seek a B licence, which was required to become a commercial pilot, in the belief that it would add to her credibility with potential sponsors. In July she returned to England aboard the SMS Rotorua and resumed her flight training at the LAC. This was paid for with a £500 loan from Truman, although this was never acknowledged by Batten, who later wrote in her autobiography that her mother, still in New Zealand, provided the necessary funds. Truman left the RAF in 1932 and was soon in London as well, tutoring Batten in navigation while he also worked towards gaining a B licence. Batten gained hers in December 1932 and then disentangled herself from Truman without ever paying back the £500 he lent her.

In addition to her flight training, Batten learnt how to maintain aircraft and their engines. This was helpful for while on a delivery flight for a Gipsy Moth biplane, she experienced engine trouble and had to land the aeroplane at Sandhurst Military Academy. She was able to facilitate a repair and continue the flight. During her time at the LAC, she met Victor Dorée, who came from a wealthy family. Dorée borrowed £400 from his mother to buy Batten a Gipsy Moth, with which she intended to beat Johnson's record for flying from England to Australia solo. The agreement, as later recalled by Batten in her autobiography, entitled Dorée to half of any profits to be made from the endeavour. Batten modified the Gipsy Moth, acquired from the King's Flight and previously flown by the then Prince of Wales, by fitting extra fuel tanks to increase its range to 800 miles (1,300 km). Visas and landing rights in 14 countries were secured, she made arrangements for refueling, and obtained a plethora of information on landmarks along her route.

=== First attempt ===
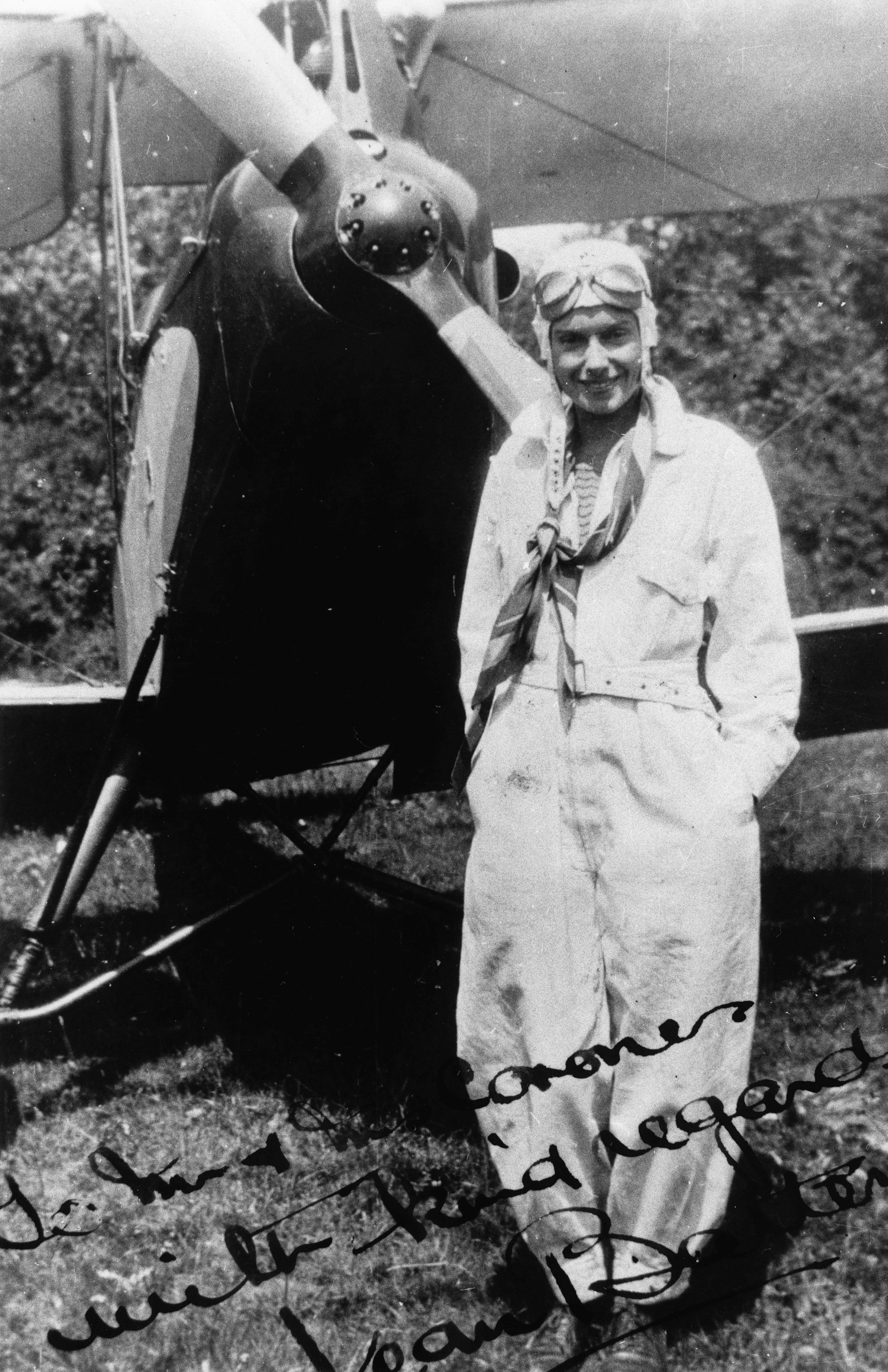
Batten with a Gipsy Moth

On 9 April 1933, Batten commenced her flight to Australia, a trip of 10,500 miles (16,900 km), flying from Lympne Aerodrome. The flight was planned to end by landing at Darwin in Australia. Her departure was widely reported and her mother, present for the occasion, gave an interview that appeared to give the impression of a united and well-off family. Batten was not the only pilot attempting to break the record for the trip to Australia at the time; she took off 24 hours after an Italian, Leonida Robbiano, started his endeavour from Lympne.

The first leg was to Rome and was the first non-stop solo effort to be made by a woman from England to Italy. Batten noted that this flight "caused considerable comment". Over the next few days she made stops at Naples, Athens, Aleppo, and Baghdad. At Bushehr, in Iran, she encountered Robbiano who had run out of fuel. (Note: Robbiano was killed a few days later when his aircraft crashed in the Bay of Bengal.) During the leg to Karachi, she made a forced landing due to a sandstorm. This damaged the propeller and with the help of locals, she travelled to Karachi to source a replacement, and then returned to the stranded aircraft. Delayed by 48 hours, she resumed her flight to Karachi, having fitted the new propeller. During the flight, she experienced engine trouble. Making a forced landing on a road, the Gipsy Moth was flipped onto its back. While she was unharmed, the accident put an end to her record flight attempt; she had flown 4,775 miles (7,685 km).

With the assistance of personnel from the RAF station at Karachi, Batten's aircraft was retrieved but without funds, she was unable to proceed. Then Charles Wakefield, the chairman of the Castrol oil company, intervened. He wanted to assist Batten and paid for her repatriation to England along with the wrecked Gipsy Moth. Back in England by early May, the Gipsy Moth was sold to the Brooklands Flying Club to be reconditioned. She could not persuade Dorée to buy her another aircraft and after this, she had nothing further to do with him. (Note: In her unpublished memoirs, she claimed she paid him back for the Gipsy Moth, although biographer Ian Mackersey states that this was disputed by Dorée's family.)

=== Second attempt ===
Batten still intended to make her record flight and for several months, she unsuccessfully sought financial assistance from newspapers and aviation companies. She struggled to make ends meet in London, where she once again lived with her mother, whose allowance of £3 from Fred Batten was their only source of income. Due to a quarrel with her brother John, there was no financial assistance from him. The lack of funds meant her membership at the LAC lapsed and she was unable to fly. Finally, with £400 in funding from Castrol, she purchased a second-hand Gipsy Moth for £240. She kept her new aircraft at Brooklands, an aerodrome in Surrey, living nearby with her mother while the Gipsy Moth was prepared for her record attempt. During her time at Brooklands, she met Edward Walter, a fellow Gipsy Moth pilot who was a stockbroker. The two became engaged to be married within a few weeks of their meeting.

Batten commenced her second attempt on 21 April, departing from Lympne Aerodrome that morning and arriving at Marseille for a refuelling stop in the early afternoon. Weather conditions were poor and the French authorities tried to dissuade her from leaving. When she did take off, it was only after signing an indemnity. By the time she had reached the Italian coast, it was dark, the flight having taken longer than expected due to headwinds. She ran out of fuel over Rome and glided to a crash landing at San Paolo wireless station. Contrary to her later claims of having "very little damage", the Gipsy Moth was in a very bad state and she had received a cut to her face.

It took over a week for her aircraft to be repaired. The company carrying out the work did so for free, in acknowledgement of her courage, but Batten still had to source replacement parts. Walter sent over the propeller from his own aircraft, and a lower wing was borrowed from an Italian pilot who also owned a Gipsy Moth. Ten days after the crash, Batten flew her repaired aircraft back to England. She had decided to make a third attempt rather than continue with her present flight, which would have to include her time spent in Rome waiting for the repairs to her aircraft to be completed.

=== Third attempt ===
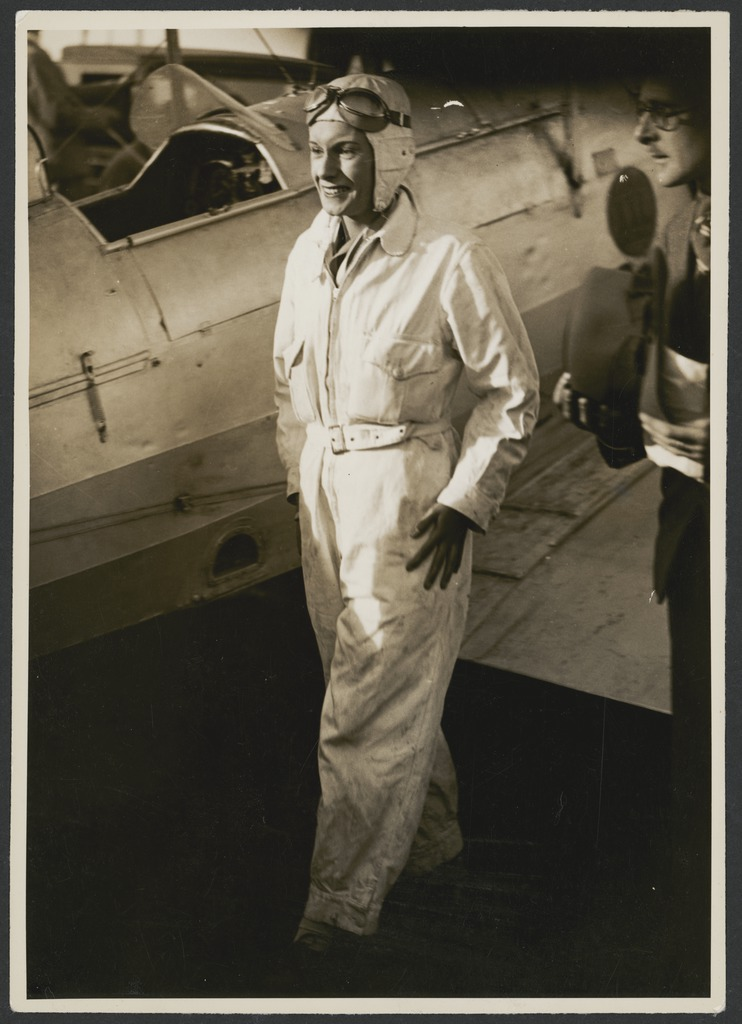
Batten after landing in Australia to complete her record flight. She made a point of wearing a white flying suit for the occasion.

Batten arrived back at Brooklands on 6 May and promptly began preparing for her next flight. Despite Walter wanting her to give up on the record attempt, she persuaded him to lend her the lower wings of his Gipsy Moth. The set she had borrowed in Italy required refurbishment and she wanted to start her flight as soon as possible. Her aircraft was made ready and she departed from Lympne Aerodrome on 8 May, aiming to reach Australia in 14 days.

Batten flew to Marseille, refuelled, and then went on to Rome, arriving at nighttime. The next day, she flew to Athens. The third day involved a single leg of around seven hours flying to Cyprus. Her 2,340 miles (3,770 km) flight from London to Cyprus was the first time this trip had been successfully completed by a solo pilot. On day four, the leg to Baghdad, she ran into sandstorms and this caused her to divert to Rutbah Wells, 250 miles (400 km) to the west of Baghdad. The next day she flew onto Basra and day six was a leg to Jask. Day seven was a 700 miles (1,100 km) flight to Karachi and passed without incident. Batten flew onto Jodhpur and then Allahabad on day eight, before going onto Calcutta, 1,400 miles (2,300 km) away, where she ended day nine by landing at Dum Dum Aerodrome.

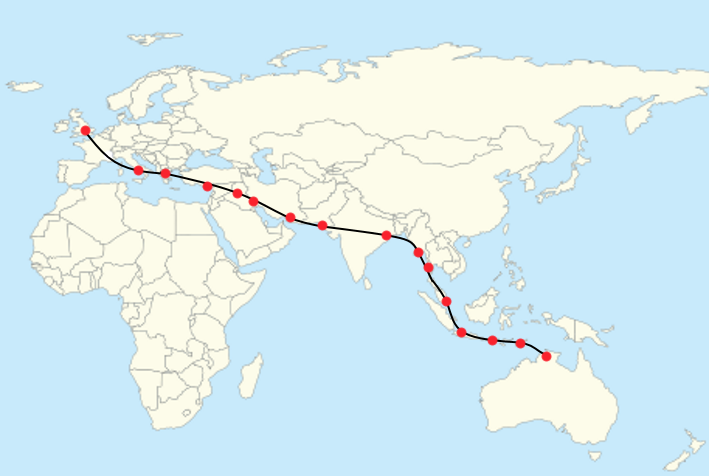
Batten's approximate flight path from England to Australia, May 1934; the second and successive red dots indicate the final stop for each day of flying

Rangoon was the destination for day ten. On the following day, Batten encountered the Intertropical Convergence Zone, flying into stormy weather. With insufficient fuel to return to Rangoon, she carried on through driving rain and turbulence, relying on solely instruments at times, until she landed at Victoria Point. The rain meant she was unable to continue on to Alor Star, the planned final stop for the day. She flew to Alor Star the next day instead and after refueling there flew on to Salatar in Singapore to end day twelve. She was tracking well for her record attempt, being two days ahead of Johnson at the same stage of the flight. Media interest in her endeavour was increasing.

Day thirteen's leg was to Batavia, in the Dutch East Indies. Fog delayed Batten's departure the next day but she eventually took off and, after refueling at Surabaya, flew to Rambang on Lombok Island. Day fourteen was a single leg of two hours to Timor, during which she had to deal with fallout from a volcanic eruption on Flores Island. When she landed at Kupang, she was only 530 miles (850 km) from Australia. Batten's trip was now front-page headlines in London. The final leg, on 23 May 1934, involved a flight across the Timor Sea to Darwin. Batten anticipated a flight time of around six hours but miscalculated, resulting in some anxious moments until the Australian landmass was sighted. She landed at Darwin's aerodrome at 1:30pm. Her trip time of 14 days, 22 hours and 30 minutes had beaten Johnson's record by over four days.

The breaking of Johnson's record was front-page news around the world and there was extensive and generally effusive reporting on Batten's feat by mainstream newspapers. However, The Times pointed out that the feat was achieved simply by spending less time on the ground and it saw little merit in record flights such as Batten's. The aeronautical press was also more restrained, with Flight magazine crediting improvements in ground facilities as a factor in her achievement. While Batten's successful solo flight was only the third to be made by a woman flying from Europe to Australia, (Note: Johnson's flight was the first, and a German pilot, Elly Beinhorn, made the second, in 1932, which took 110 days to complete due to lengthy stopovers for sightseeing.) the general route had already been flown thirty times and the overall record for a solo England to Australia flight stood at seven days, five hours, achieved by Kingsford-Smith the previous year. Much of the appeal for the public was due to Batten's beauty and glamour which was in contrast to Johnson's more down-to-earth nature.

== Australian tour ==
Batten with her cat mascot 'Buddy', Sydney, 1934

Staying the night at Darwin, Batten commenced a flight to Sydney in her Gipsy Moth the next day. The journey took a week, with a delay in Queensland due to engine trouble. At each stop along the way, she was greeted by well-wishers and received telegrams, in addition to those she had received while at Darwin. It was during this trip that she gave an interview in which she announced her engagement to Walter, much to his displeasure as he then had to deal with reporters. She later wrote to him stating it was "good publicity". Wakefield, keen to capitalise on the publicity, arranged for an escort airplane to accompany her and the Gipsy Moth was emblazoned with a Castrol sticker. He also encouraged Batten to maintain a high profile.

When Batten flew into Sydney on 30 May, a flight of 20 aircraft met her over the city's harbour before she landed at Mascot aerodrome. A crowd of 5,000 was present to greet her. Several public engagements followed for the next four weeks during which she was hosted at the expense of the Australian Government. Wakefield soon gave her £1,000, although this was never publicly acknowledged by Batten. Acquaintances she met during this time noted her self-centred nature, and Nancy Bird, a well-known pilot of the 1930s, considered Batten to be a "prima donna".

== New Zealand tour ==
As her aircraft did not have the range to cross the Tasman Sea, Batten travelled to New Zealand by ship. The Gipsy Moth was shipped over at the expense of the Union Steam Ship Company. As in Australia, large crowds turned out to greet her and she was the guest of honour at numerous civic receptions. She also received a grant of £500 from the New Zealand Government, which hosted her at Government House for a time. She toured the country, giving people the opportunity to take £1 joyrides in her Gipsy Moth and giving paid lectures. In her home town of Rotorua, she was made an honorary rangitane (chieftainess) by Te Arawa, the local Māori iwi (tribe).

In her various public appearances, Batten regularly paid tribute to her mother. When Batten arrived at Darwin to end her record flight, one of her first acts was to send a telegram to Ellen. It read: "Darling, we've done it. The aeroplane, you, me". Ellen joined her daughter in touring New Zealand, having travelled there by steamship. Shortly after her arrival, she gave an interview stating that Batten and Walter were not engaged. This was contrary to Batten's own earlier comments on the matter but she never contradicted her mother.

By the end of her New Zealand visit in September 1934, Batten had created an image of herself as a skilled and courageous aviator. She was now firmly established as an international hero and a source of pride for New Zealand. However, she downplayed her flying accidents and the financial support she had received earlier in her career and the difference between her public and private personas was noted; the Castrol representative accompanying her on her tour of New Zealand found her to be arrogant and immodest. She made a significant sum of money from the tour, around £2,500, equivalent to about £100,000 in 2014, but did not pay back Truman or Dorée, and wrote later that the flight "had not been a great financial success".

Returning to Australia, Batten was a radio commentator at the MacRobertson Air Race, for aircraft flying from England to Melbourne in honour of the city's centenary. She had hoped to enter the race itself, which had a first prize of £10,000, but was unable to get to England in time for the start on 20 October. Afterwards, she returned to Sydney, where she had temporarily based herself, intending in due course to go onto England and marry Walter. She was now also a published author; her account of her record-breaking flight was published by Jackson & O'Sullivan Limited in Sydney as Solo Flight. The book did not sell well, with one reviewer describing it as "not a brilliant book" and another considered the transcript of the log of her flight to be the most interesting part of the book.

While in Sydney, she met Beverly Shepherd, a 23-year-old who was training to become a commercial pilot and a relationship promptly developed. According to Batten, this was much to the displeasure of Ellen, who regarded her daughter as being committed to Walter, even though she had previously publicly denied the existence of the couple's engagement. By March 1935, the engagement was off. Batten had written to Walter to end the relationship but it was reported in the media prior to him receiving her letter. This left him bitter at the news. She later wrote that on arriving in Australia to complete her record flight, she realised that she wanted to prioritise her aviation career for a few years and saw marriage as compromising her ambitions.

== Return to England ==
By April 1935, Batten was preparing to fly her Gipsy Moth back to England. Although it was not publicly declared, she hoped to set a new record for flying time between Australia and England. In her autobiography, she stated that the purpose of her return was to be in London for the Silver Jubilee of George V. Shepherd accompanied her in his own de Havilland Puss Moth part of the way to Darwin, from where she was to leave Australia. She commenced the first leg on 12 April, heading for Kupang in Timor. About halfway through the flight across the Timor Sea, her engine stopped; she had to glide for some time, nearly ditching in the sea, before successfully restarting it. The engine continued to play up for the remainder of the trip. On arriving at Kupang, she cleaned some of the components of the fuel system as she and a Dutch mechanic suspected dust was to blame for the problem. Despite this, she continued to experience similar intermittent engine problems for the remainder of her journey to England.

Batten largely followed the reverse of the route flown on her outward trip to Australia. She avoided the worst of the Intertropical Convergence Zone but was slowed by headwinds flying west across West Asia. She had further engine trouble over Italy and by the time she reached Marseille, there was only a slim chance of beating her record, and even then it would only be by a few minutes. However, she suffered a puncture and more engine problems. She arrived at Croydon, in England, having taken 17 days, 16 hours, to make the journey from Australia to England. She was still the first woman to fly solo from England to Australia and back again. Although only a few people were at Croydon for her arrival, her return to England was widely reported. When interviewed, she claimed that she had no help or financial backing, and credited her persistence for the successful endeavour. This disregarded the support provided by Castrol. In recognition of her record flight, the Women's International Association of Aeronautics, in the United States, awarded her its Challenge Trophy for 1934.

== England to Brazil ==
Batten had turned her mind to a record flight from England to South America even before she had left Australia in April. Few pilots had attempted record flights over the South Atlantic; the record at the time was 16 hours, 30 minutes, held by the Spaniard Juan Ignacio Pombo, and no female had yet done it solo. The record for the quickest flight from England to Brazil was held by Jim Mollison, who achieved it in three days, ten hours, and Batten decided to attempt to break this record as well. However, the route was already in use by Zeppelin airships and the French airline Aeropostale also regularly crossed the South Atlantic for its mail service. At least one aviation journal thought Batten's record attempt, once it became public knowledge, had little value.

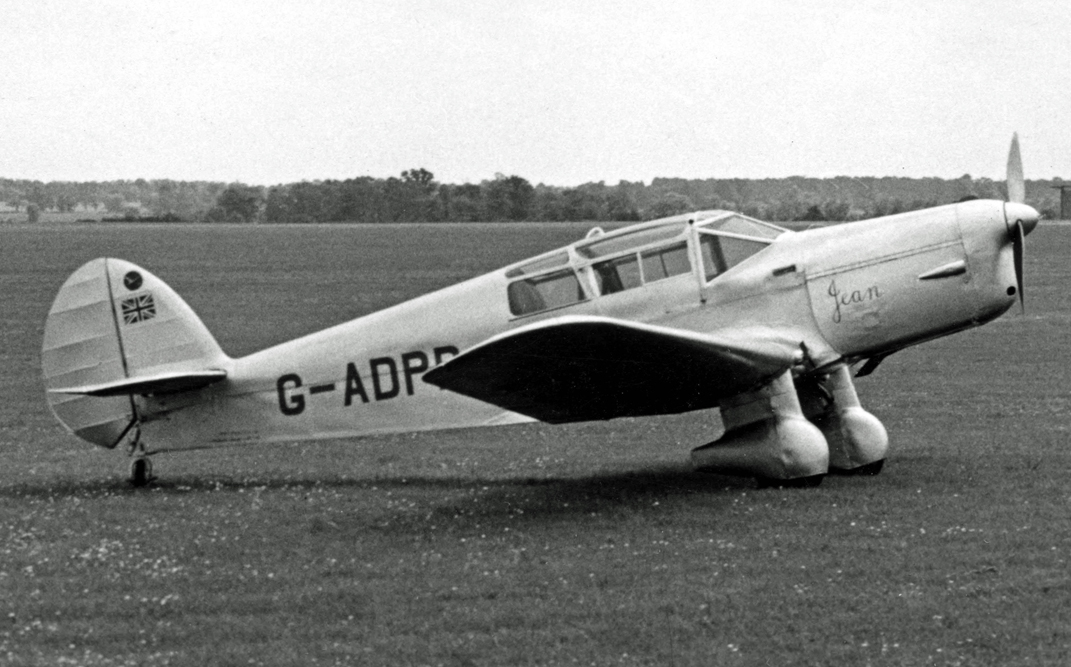
Batten's record-breaking Percival Gull Six named Jean on its engine cowling at a 1954 UK air show

To replace the Gipsy Moth, Batten purchased a Percival Gull Six monoplane. Much faster than her old aeroplane, it had a six-cylinder 200 horsepower de Havilland Gipsy Six engine, electrically operated fuel pumps and starter motor, an enclosed cabin that seated three people and was capable of flying 150 miles (240 km) per hour. She arranged for the Gull to be fitted with auxiliary fuel tanks, giving it a range of 2,000 miles (3,200 km), and a discreet toilet tube. She took delivery of the aircraft, finished in silver with the registration G-ADPR, on 15 September, her birthday. According to Batten, it had cost £1,750, "practically every penny" she had. Mackersey doubts the accuracy of this statement, pointing out Batten had received fees from newspapers and film companies, as well as money earned from the Australian flight and the sale of her Gipsy Moth. (Note: The Gipsy Moth was sold to Michael Sassoon, the brother of poet Siegfried Sassoon, for what Batten claimed was a "small profit". It was destroyed by a fire during the Second World War, having been passed onto the National Women's Air Reserve.)

Batten planned to start from Lympne Aerodrome, flying 1,500 miles (2,400 km) to Casablanca, go onto Dakar, in West Africa, via Villa Cisneros in the Spanish Sahara, and then flying 1,900 miles (3,100 km) across the South Atlantic to land at Port Natal in Brazil. When she left on 11 November 1935, it was to news that Kingsford Smith had disappeared off the coast of Burma during an attempt to make the quickest England-Australia flight. Making Casablanca without incident she left the next day for a military airfield at Thies. This was a late change to her itinerary due to the aerodrome at Dakar being under repair. However, on arrival she found that her fuel was still at Dakar. It was dispatched and arrived at midnight whereupon she immediately organised the refuelling of her Gull.

After a short nap, and despite a pessimistic weather forecast, Batten left Thies at 4:45am, 13 November. Because of the short airfield, and the amount of fuel being carried, she opted to lighten the load of her aircraft. Among other items, she left behind her tool kit, signal pistol, spare engine parts, emergency water and life raft. She soon ran into the South Atlantic convergence zone and the weather encountered at this stage meant that she effectively flew blind for some time. A local magnetic disturbance affected her compass, and she had to resort to her turn indicator to keep her bearing. Despite these difficulties, she still encountered her target landmark, Cap San Roque, once she reached the Brazilian coastline after 12 and a half hours of flying. She landed at Port Natal thirteen hours, 15 minutes, after her departure from Thies; this lowered the record for a solo crossing of the South Atlantic by three hours. It took her two days, thirteen hours and 15 minutes to fly from England to Brazil, breaking Mollison's record by nearly 24 hours. She also had achieved the overall fastest flight time for crossing the Atlantic, beating by 22 minutes the record set by a four-engined Air France aeroplane.

The next day, 14 November, Batten set out for Rio de Janeiro, a flight of around 10 hours. On the way, the Gull suffered a fuel leak and she landed on a beach about 175 miles (282 km) from her destination. She was able to find shelter in a nearby village. According to Batten, she telegraphed for assistance but there was considerable consternation when she did not arrive at Rio at her scheduled time and, in the absence of knowledge of her whereabouts, search and rescue aircraft were dispatched in the morning. After a few hours, her Gull, and Batten herself, were located. The Brazilian Air Force provided fuel and repaired her propeller, damaged when landing, and she continued onto Rio, landing at Campos dos Alfonsos.

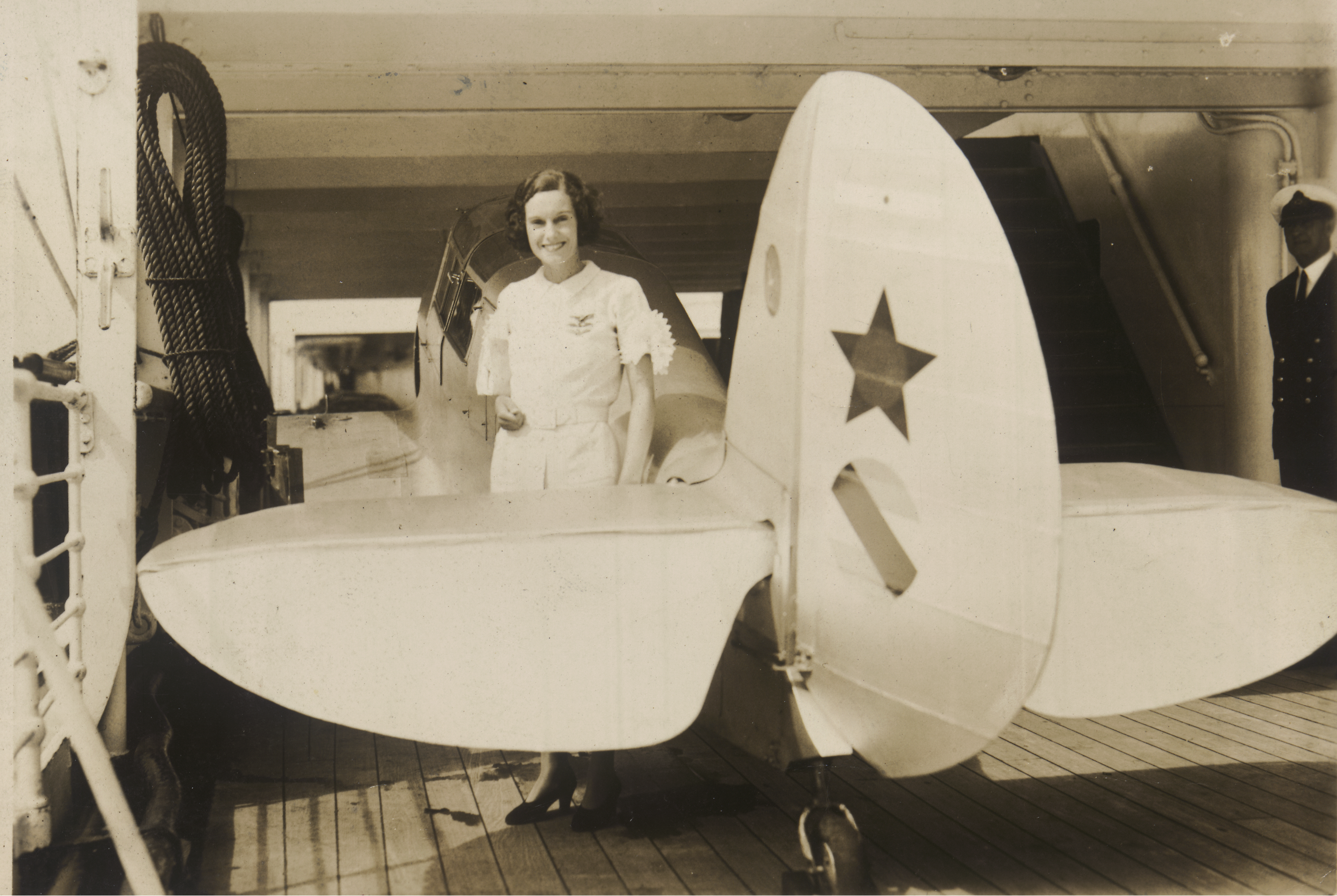
In a photograph from the Brazilian archives, Jean Batten and her Gull are shown on the deck of a passenger ship

To acknowledge her success, the Brazilian President, Dr. Vargas, presented her with the Order of the Southern Cross; according to Batten, she was the first British woman, other than Royalty, to be so honoured. She was gifted money by the local British Chamber of Commerce and made an honorary officer in the Brazilian Air Force, which also presented her a trophy, "The Spirit of Aviation". She then flew onto Argentina and Uruguay and while in Buenos Aires, she received an offer from Charles Lindbergh to make a lecture tour of the United States. She declined, opting instead to return to England. According to Peggy Kelman, an Australian aviator of the 1930s interviewed by Mackersey, Batten had written to her mother for permission to take the tour but this was not forthcoming and she was ordered to go back to England. She arrived at Southampton on 23 December aboard the RMS Asturias, the Gull in its hold. In her autobiography, Batten makes no mention of Lindberg's offer, noting that she wanted to be in London for Christmas.

== Interlude ==
After spending Christmas Day with her mother in Hatfield, Batten went to Southampton to fly her Gull back to Hatfield aerodrome. During the flight, she crashed her aeroplane. In an interview given to a reporter of the Daily Express, she blamed an engine failure that forced her to glide to a crash landing on South Downs, in West Sussex. She suffered a cut to her head and a concussion, while the Gull's wings were twisted and its undercarriage was torn away. The Gull was taken to Gravesend to be repaired. During this time, and claiming her aeroplane was "being overhauled", she went to Paris to receive a gold medal presented by the French Academy of Sports and met Louis Blériot, who had made the first aeroplane flight across the English Channel in 1909. The French Government shortly announced its intention to award her the Legion of Honour (Légion d'honneur) with the rank of Knight (Chevalier).

She received further honours: these included the Britannia Trophy, awarded by the Royal Aero Club for the most meritorious flight of 1935 to be made by a British subject, the Challenge Trophy, which she was awarded for the second time by the Women's International Association of Aeronautics, and the Harmon Trophy, jointly awarded to Batten and Amelia Earhart. (Note: Earhart had made the first solo flight from Hawaii to California, hence her recognition with the Harmon Trophy.) The Daily Express also named her as one of its five "Women of 1935".

Once her Gull was repaired, Batten took her mother on a flying holiday to Spain and Morocco. When back in England, she often attended public engagements and functions but otherwise was largely reclusive. In June, Batten was created Commander of the Order of the British Empire (CBE) in the King's Birthday Honours, for "general services to aviation". The New Zealand Government had agitated for Batten to be made a Dame but this was not entertained by officials in London, who were reluctant to reward risky record flight attempts. She was invested with the CBE by King Edward VIII in a ceremony at Buckingham Palace on 14 July.

== England to New Zealand ==
By this time, Batten's preparations for another world record flight, from England to New Zealand, were underway. She also aimed to break the men's record for the England-Australia flight, which stood at six days, 21 hours, and was held by Jimmy Broadbent. Batten and her mother had completed an 80-mile (130 km) walking trip across the South Downs for fitness while the Gull was being prepared. She spent time in London obtaining the necessary permissions to fly over the countries along her route. The latest maps were purchased and facilities were arranged for her stops on the way to New Zealand.

In the presence of a large media turnout, Batten departed Lympne Aerodrome on the morning of 5 October 1936. With stops at Marseille, Brindisi, Cyprus, Syria, and Basra, she arrived at Karachi after two and a half days of flying. She had deliberately kept her rest time to a minimum, and the operational ceiling of the Gull allowed her to fly at a height that avoided the worst of the turbulence. Batten then flew onto Akyab, in Burma, a distance of 1,900 miles (3,100 km) with a stop for fuel at Allahabad. Making an early start the next day, 9 October, she departed at 1:00am for Alor Star, in British Malaya. She encountered bad weather during the 1,300 miles (2,100 km) flight and was unable to land at Alor Star. Instead, she had to go on to Penang, a further 60 miles (97 km) away. She had a fright when she realised the driving rain was stripping the fabric and dope (a lacquer used to weatherproof aircraft fabric) from the leading edges of her wings; this required repair at Penang. She flew onto Singapore while it was still light, and the repair work to her wings was performed at the RAF station there. By this time, her total flight time was four days, 17 hours. She left for Rambang, on Lombok, that night and then onto Kupang in Timor. Here she discovered that the tailwheel of the Gull, part of the landing gear, had a puncture. It took several hours to effect a repair, and by then it was too late to leave for Darwin. She was phlegmatic about the delay for it allowed her to have much-needed sleep. She left Kupang at dawn, 11 October, and arrived at Darwin after four hours of flying, where a large crowd had gathered to greet her. She had problems landing; the throttle stuck open on one attempt. On the second, one of the main wheel brakes failed, causing the Gull to perform a ground loop before coming to a halt. The total trip time from England to Australia was five days, 21 hours, which set a new absolute record for a solo flight for this route. Batten's achievement was front-page news around the world.

=== Delay in Australia ===
Batten was conscious that she needed to push on to Auckland in New Zealand, still some 3,700 miles (6,000 km) away. From Darwin, she flew onto Longreach in Queensland, where she spent the night. Despite many locals turning out to meet her, she declined to greet them and also refused media interviews. She flew onto Sydney the next day, being greeted by a fleet of aircraft over the city's harbour that would escort her into the Mascot airfield. Here she was delayed for two days; the weather over the Tasman was not favourable for a crossing and in addition, there was also public opposition to making the flight in a single-engined aircraft, as the Tasman was noted for difficult weather and the majority of the previous crossings had been achieved in multi-engine aircraft. Batten suspected sexism played a role, noting that "...Australia like New Zealand is still very much 'a man's country'". She also had difficulties with officialdom. The Australian Civil Aviation Department would not allow her to leave on account that the amount of fuel that the Gull would need to carry to make the 1,200 miles (1,900 km) flight over the Tasman would make its overall weight exceed the limit on its certificate of airworthiness. This was overcome when she was able to produce a special endorsement provided by the British authorities that allowed the Gull to takeoff with an extra 1,000 pounds (450 kg) of weight beyond what was stipulated on its certificate of airworthiness.

The delay due to the poor weather over the Tasman meant that she was able to make herself available to the media. She earned £600 for a radio interview and secured exclusive deals with a consortium of newspapers and film companies. Media mogul Frank Packer offered her £5,000 to stay in Australia and do a lecture tour rather than fly to New Zealand. She declined, preferring the "honour of completing the first solo flight from England to New Zealand and linking the two countries in direct flight for the first time in history". While waiting for the Tasman to clear, she also spent time, albeit limited, with Beverly Shepherd, who was now an airline captain.

=== Trans-Tasman crossing ===
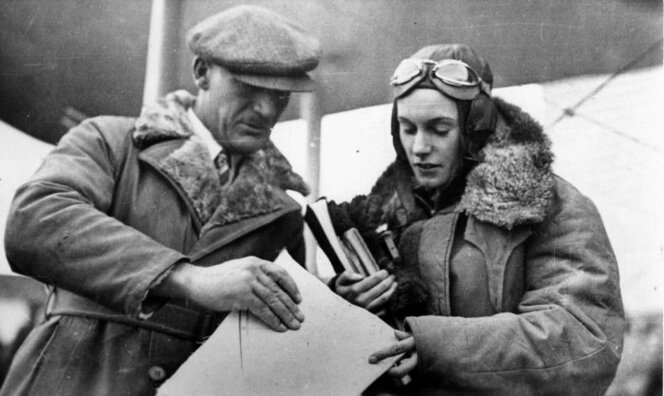
Jean Batten with Malcolm McGregor, circa 1936

On 16 October, Batten departed for New Zealand at 4:35am, local time. She left from the Royal Australian Air Force's airbase at Richmond, the longer runway giving her more space to get her heavily loaded Gull in the air. The weather forecast was still not ideal; rather than flying direct to Auckland, where she was to land at Mangere Aerodrome, she decided to aim for New Plymouth, a slightly shorter distance over the sea, and then fly north to Māngere. Before she left, at 4:30am in front of a large press contingent, she specifically instructed that if she came down in the Tasman, no one was to be sent to look for her. She did not want anyone's life to be put at risk.

The flight to New Plymouth, about 1,330 miles (2,140 km) from Richmond, took nine and a half hours, a record for the Trans-Tasman crossing. Due to rain clouds and squalls, she flew below 1,000 feet (300 m) most of the way so she could observe her drift. She did a flypast for a crowd gathered at New Plymouth airfield and then flew north to Māngere as planned. She landed just after 5:00pm in front of a crowd of around 6,000 people. She had set a record of eleven days, 45 minutes for a direct flight from England to New Zealand; this would stand for 44 years before it was broken. She also set a record of ten and a half hours for the crossing from Sydney to Auckland. (Note: The record was broken by over an hour the following year by a flying boat on a commercial flight.) In her autobiography, she described the cheers from the crowd at Māngere as the "greatest moment in my life", sentiments she expressed in her speech to the crowd. Her father was among those who greeted her, although he was given short-shrift as Batten focussed on the adulation from the crowd and the official reception party.

Batten's feat was widely reported around the world, with media comparing her to Amy Johnson and Amelia Earhart. The Times in London called the endeavour "an act of deliberate courage". Telegrams flooded in; according to Batten, there were 1,700 cables received from overseas. The Government provided her with four secretaries to help her respond to all of them. At a civic reception held in Auckland a few days later, the city's mayor announced the naming of "Jean Batten Place" in her honour.

== Publicity tour ==
Batten embarked on a publicity tour, eager to make money. She wanted to recover the expenses incurred on her England-New Zealand flight and have some profit to fund further flying, despite the effort likely "overdrawing on [her] reserve energy". This began on the day of her arrival at Māngere when she collected a portion of the fees charged for vehicle parking at the aerodrome. Despite being fatigued, the same evening she gave the first lecture of her tour at an Auckland cinema. Her Gull was later displayed at a shop in Auckland, where people paid to see it. She began to charge a shilling for her autograph and signed several hundred books. A public subscription raised over £2,000 for her.

She soon found her tour was compromised by the exclusive contracts she had entered into with the media while in Sydney; two minders controlled the public and rival media's access to her. This impacted public reporting of her tour and attendance suffered. In addition, behind the scenes, Batten exhibited self-centred behaviour which alienated many who witnessed it. While in Auckland, she also had a confrontation with Fred Truman, who had loaned her £500 back in 1931. Batten had steadfastly ignored his pleas to repay the debt. In the end, he approached Batten's father regarding the amount owed. Fred Batten, embarrassed at discovering Batten was so indebted, facilitated a meeting between his daughter and Truman, at which she handed over a cheque for £250 and swiftly departed. The balance was never repaid.

By the time Batten arrived in Christchurch, she was depressed at the poor attendance of her lecture tour and physically exhausted. She took a rest on medical advice. The remainder of the tour was cancelled, and she later described the decision as a result of being "too tired to carry on". Most of November was spent in the South Island, on the West Coast and at Franz Josef Glacier, at the expense of the Government. By the end of the month, her morale had been boosted with news of more honours. For the second successive year, she was awarded the Royal Aero Club's Britannia Trophy for the most meritorious performance in aviation by a British subject. She was awarded the Harmon Trophy again, this time outright, for her 1936 flights. Finally, she received the Segrave Trophy, awarded for the "most outstanding demonstration during the year of the possibilities of transport on land, water or air". She later wrote that this "was a very great honour".

At the end of November, Batten travelled to Sydney where she was going to meet her mother who had left England after hearing of her daughter's breakdown. While in Sydney awaiting the arrival of Ellen Batten, she reunited with Beverly Shepherd. The two spent several days together. In her unpublished memoirs, she wrote that Shepherd struggled with being with someone as famous as her. Once Ellen arrived, she and Batten returned to New Zealand where they would remain for three months. For part of the time, they were joined by Fred Batten, presenting an image of a united family, as her parents' separation was not public knowledge. Christmas was spent in her birthplace of Rotorua, where she was honoured by local Māori, as she had been after her 1934 journey. She was given a chief's kahu huruhuru (feather cloak) and conferred with the title Hine-o-te-Rangi – "Daughter of the Skies".

In February 1937, Batten, accompanied by her mother, travelled to Sydney to join Shepherd. Publicly, she gave the impression of wanting to continue flying despite friends apparently trying to persuade her to settle down, writing "the fire of adventure that burned within me was not yet quenched" but privately, she expressed a keen desire to marry Shepherd, who was flying from Brisbane to meet her in Sydney. The evening of her arrival on 19 February, she discovered he was missing; the passenger airliner on which he was co-pilot had failed to arrive. Batten was involved in the search for the missing aircraft, even after it was officially called off after five days. The public at large remained unaware of her keen interest in Shepherd; she maintained that her interest was simply as a close friend of one of the missing pilots, describing him as "a great friend of mine". The wreck of the aircraft was discovered in the MacPherson Ranges by the bushman Bernard O'Reilly on 28 February, with two survivors. It had crashed during a storm and burst into flames. Shepherd was among the dead.

In her unpublished memoirs, Batten admitted to profound grief at the loss of Shepherd. She withdrew from society and with her mother, moved to a flat near Sydney's beaches. The two lived in Australia for the next eight months and for much of this time, Batten was undecided about her future plans. Then, in September, she learnt that Broadbent was going to attempt to break her record for the England-Australia flight; he then held the record of six days, nine hours for the Australia-England flight. Batten shortly announced her intention to break Broadbent's record.

== Australia to England ==
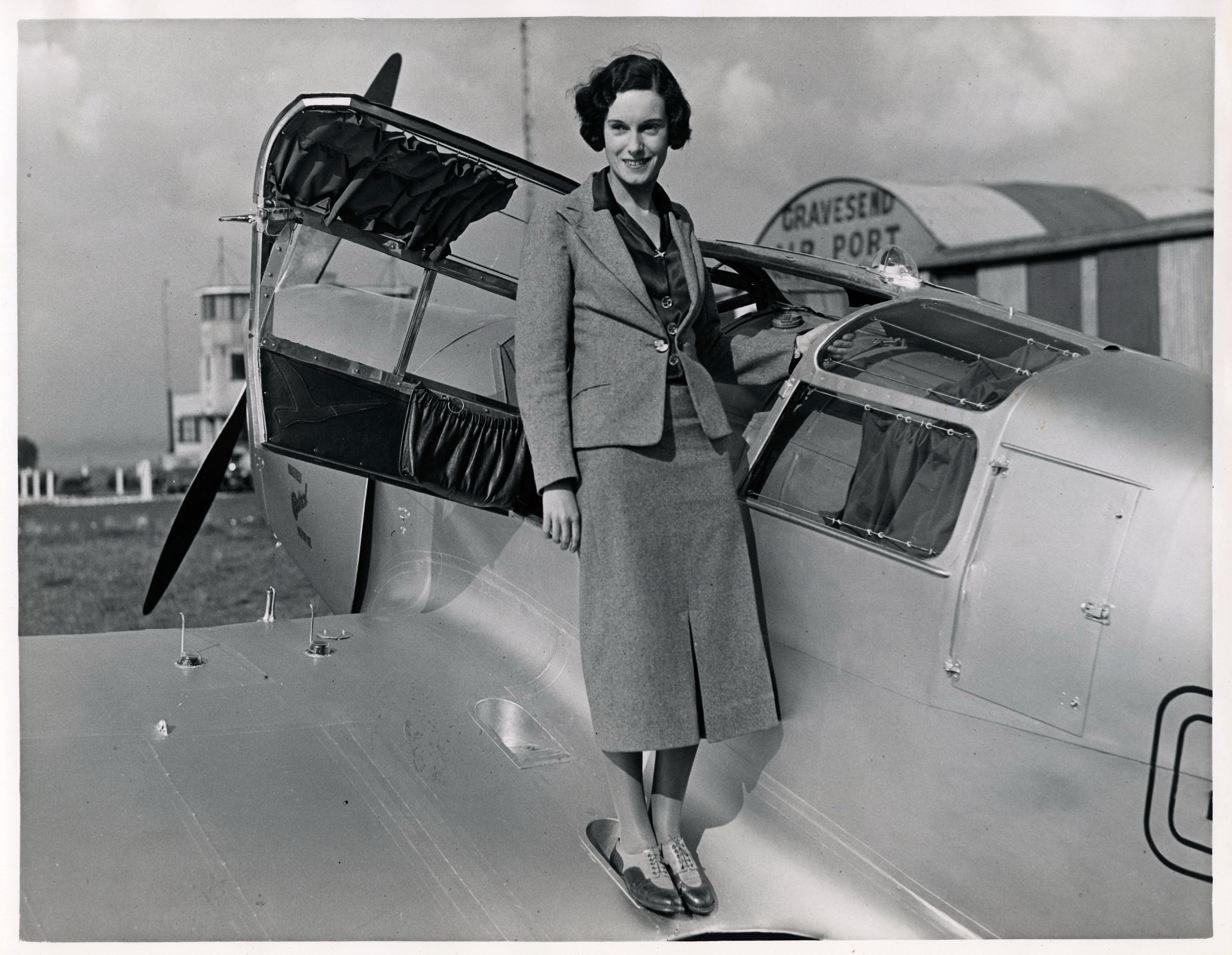
Jean Batten and her Gull

Batten planned to use her Percival Gull for the attempt and arranged for its engine to be overhauled. For her personal fitness, she embarked on a programme of swimming, skipping and running. Her mother in the meantime departed Australia so that she could be in England to greet Batten when she arrived. To cover her expenses, Batten sought sponsorship from Frank Packer; his interest was lukewarm, advising her that with regular air services to Australia, the days of pioneering flights were over. In the end, he agreed to an exclusive deal whereby she would prepare a 200-word report at the end of each day. Newspapers were describing the event as a duel between Batten and Broadbent. Batten noted that it was "infinitely more difficult to fly from Australia to England than in the opposite direction" because headwinds "retard progress on the route in England". Journalists questioned the value of the attempt, one noting that with the advancement of commercial aviation, "the day of the adventure flier draws to a close".

After a delay because of weather, Batten's record attempt commenced from Darwin on 19 October 1937, with a flight to Rambang on Lombok Island, where she refueled, and flew onto Batavia to finish her first day. It had been nearly 1,800 miles (2,900 km) of flying. Rising early, she commenced the next leg, to Alor Star, while it was still dark. According to her autobiography, she encountered thunderstorms within an hour of her departure and much of her flight was spent flying on instruments. After a brief stop at Alor Star, she carried on to Rangoon, arriving there just 36 hours after commencing the record attempt from Darwin. She had already flown 3,700 miles (6,000 km). The next day, she flew 2,150 miles (3,460 km) to Karachi, with a stop for fuel at Allahabad. She had flown part of the leg at just 500 feet (150 m) to minimise the effect of the prevailing headwind. The heat was such that the soles of her shoes became stuck to the rudder pedals. On her arrival, she was advised that she was the first solo pilot to make the flight from Rangoon to Karachi in a single day. After a four-hour rest, she resumed her flight, proceeding to Basra, then Damascus and onto Athens. As she crossed the Mediterranean, a major storm was encountered and, according to her autobiography, she also experienced the St. Elmo's Fire phenomenon about the hub of her propeller.

The next leg was scheduled to be to Rome but low cloud cover over the city forced her to land at Naples instead, where she spent the night. Exhausted, on landing she had to be bodily lifted from the cockpit of the Gull and given stimulants. The weather prognosis for the next day, 24 October, was not favourable, particularly over the Mediterranean. Regardless, encouraged by many cables of support received overnight, she departed that morning for Marseilles. She skirted some storm systems to land at Marseilles and then carried onto England, where she landed at Lympne Aerodrome in the mid-afternoon. A small enthusiastic crowd was present to cheer her on arrival.

Batten had completed the flight in 5 days, 19 hours and 15 minutes. As well as lowering Broadbent's record by just over half a day, she also became the first person to hold the solo record for both the outward and inward flights. Broadbent's attempt on her England to Australia record had ended in Iraq, where he ran out of fuel. (Note: Another attempt in 1937 also ended in failure, but the following year, flying a Vega Gull, he lowered Batten's record for the solo flight from Australia to England by eight hours.) She also was within four hours of the all-time record for the fastest flight time from Australia to England, this being held by Owen Cathcart Jones and Ken Waller who had flown the trip in the multi-engined de Havilland DH.88 Comet in 1934.

After 20 minutes clearing customs at Lympne Aerodrome, Batten took off again for Croydon, at the time London's international airport. A large crowd of 10,000 was present to greet her, Ellen Batten among them. Broadbent had sent a cable of congratulations which was also awaiting her. Batten was moved by the reception at Croydon, noting that it felt "more like a homecoming than just the final landing of a record flight". Her exploit was front page news the next day; one major newspaper headlined its first page as "The Girl Who Has Beaten All The Men".

It was Batten's last long-distance flight as a pilot.

== European tour ==
With her latest record flight completed, Batten was hosted at Grosvenor Hotel in London and gave a press conference. Many questions were regarding her plans for marriage but she refused to comment on the subject. Her mother noted that Batten was too busy to consider marriage and also reiterated how much she had financially supported her daughter in her record ambitions. A publicity tour for Batten followed; she was interviewed for BBC television and radio and attended a series of banquets and receptions. Madame Tussauds made Batten's effigy in wax and she was also presented to the King and Queen at Buckingham Palace, meeting King Leopold of Belgium at the same time. By this time she was living with her mother in a flat in Kensington.

In early 1938, she was awarded the medal of the Fédération Aéronautique Internationale, aviation's highest honour; she was the first woman to receive the medal. Her autobiography, My Life, was published later in May but was poorly received, in much the same way as her previous book had been. She began to tour continental Europe with her Percival Gull; she was hosted by Blèriot's widow in Paris, King Leopold in Brussels, and by the Swedish royal family in Stockholm. Holidays in Milan and Lake Como followed. Early in 1939 she commenced a lecture tour of Scandinavia and the Baltic States on behalf of the British Council; she was well received with favourable reports being sent back to London.

With her mother, Batten embarked on a spring cruise in the Caribbean, funded by the profits from her lecture tour. Another holiday, separate from Ellen, followed in the late summer, staying in Sweden with Axel Wenner-Gren, an industrialist who was the owner of Electrolux. At the time, tensions in Europe were high, with the outbreak of war imminent. Batten was ignorant of this and was planning trips to Finland and Oslo before beginning her next lecture tour in October. Just before the end of the month she was advised by the British Foreign Ministry to not travel over German airspace when returning to England. She sought help from Wenner-Gren, who used his connections with Germany to secure clearance for Batten to fly her Percival Gull back over the North Sea with a stop at Hamburg. According to her biographer, Batten later claimed that while at Hamburg, German fighter pilots there blew her kisses. She arrived back in England on 27 August; it was to be the last time she flew herself.

== Second World War ==
Within days of the outbreak of the Second World War, Batten wrote to Harold Balfour, the Under-Secretary of State for Air, offering her services as a pilot, and her Percival Gull, for communication work. He indicated that her name would be added to a pool of civilian pilots to be called upon by the RAF. She also had Sir Francis Shelmerdine, who was the head of the National Air Communications, an agency concerned with the coordination of civil aviation for the war effort, advocating on her behalf. She hoped to join the Air Transport Auxiliary (ATA), formed at the start of the war to provide experienced pilots for ferrying aircraft. Initially, there was no place for women, but in early 1940 a female section was formed at Hatfield with Amy Johnson being an early member. (Note: Johnson died of exposure in January 1941, when she bailed out and landed in the Thames estuary after her aircraft ran out of fuel in bad weather.)

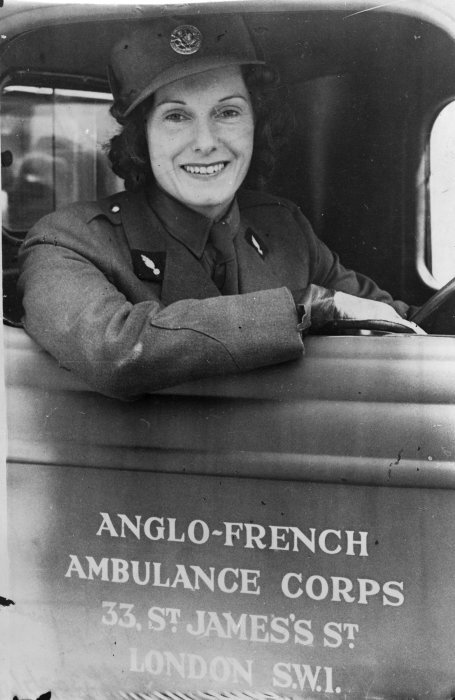
Batten as a driver for the Anglo-French Ambulance Corps, in June 1940

According to Batten's unpublished memoirs, she failed the required medical, blaming shortsightedness caused by the strain of inspecting maps in poor light during her record flight attempts. However, several of the other female pilots had imperfect vision and one flew with glasses. Mackersey speculates that Batten desired a role with the ATA that would only require her to fly her Gull. When this was not forthcoming, her enthusiasm to fly with the ATA was dimmed and later in the year, the Gull was requisitioned for war service. (Note: The Gull would be in use for six years with various RAF units around the United Kingdom, often as a target for anti-aircraft and searchlight training.)

Batten instead became a driver for the Anglo-French Ambulance Corps. This only lasted a few months and she mainly fundraised for vehicles. The Germans conquered France before she was dispatched there and the unit was subsequently disbanded. She then began working at a munitions factory in Poole, Dorset, renting an apartment nearby. Her mother moved to Dorchester and on her days off, Batten would visit her.

In 1943 she moved to London, taking up a residence in Baker Street with her mother, and began working for the National Savings Committee. She solicited donations from the public in aid of the war effort, and visited factories, industrial facilities and town halls throughout the country. According to her unpublished memoirs, during this time she met and fell in love with an RAF bomber pilot whom she identified only as Richard. She claimed to have made plans with him for the future but he was reported missing on a bombing raid later in the war.

== Later life ==
In the postwar period, Batten and her mother moved to Jamaica. Ellen Batten had struggled with her health for most of the winter months of the war years and desired to live in a more hospitable climate. Jamaica, which Batten and her mother had visited in 1939, appealed as a place to settle permanently. When the Battens arrived in November 1946, few of their friends knew where they were living; they maintained a poste restante at Thomas Cook & Son in London. Initially renting a house, they later bought a plot of land on the coast and had a dwelling, which Batten named 'Blue Horizon', built on it.

By 1953, Batten and her mother desired a return to England. 'Blue Horizon' was sold, along with their furniture, and they departed shortly afterwards by ship for Liverpool. Before they left, they invested in plots of land in Discovery Bay. For the next seven years, the duo toured Europe, going on numerous road trips and staying in low-budget hotels. The land they had purchased before leaving Jamaica was developed and sold in 1957 for a significant profit, helping fund their Europe sojourn. With Batten's mother now in her eighties and struggling with the cold of the European winters, they spent an increasing period of time in the south of Spain. Finding the area to their liking, in 1960 they purchased a villa in the Costa de Sol. They based themselves there until 1965, at which time they sold the villa and resumed their travels, beginning with a trip to Portugal by road and then travelling onto Madeira. At about the same time, Batten was invited to attend the opening of the new Auckland International Airport, sited at Mangere. Writing from Maderia, she declined on account of the event conflicting with a prearranged tour of the Canary Islands and Morocco.

Batten's mother was 89 by the time they began their trip to the Canary Islands. She died on 19 July 1966 on the island of Tenerife, at San Marcos, a fishing village where the two had rented an apartment. Batten arranged for the interment of her mother's remains at an Anglican cemetery in Puerto de la Cruz. The headstone inscription read "Ellen Batten beloved mother of Jean Batten" and lacked acknowledgement of her other children. The words "Jean Batten" were inscribed in a larger font size than that used for her mother's name. In a state of depression, Batten disregarded an offer from her brother to stay with him in Auckland and instead went back to Jamaica to stay with a friend there. However, she insisted on seclusion and did not mix with other former acquaintances while there, and after a time returned to Tenerife. Her father died in July 1967, but this had nowhere near the effect on her as her mother's death.

== Return to public life ==
After three years as a recluse from society, Batten returned to public life in 1969 when she was invited to be present at the start of an air race from England to Australia. She revamped her image by dyeing her hair, undergoing cosmetic surgery and updating her wardrobe. Once in London, she attended a number of events, and was with Sir Francis Chichester when he started the air race. None of the competitors were able to lower her record for the England-Australia flight, much to her pleasure. She was reunited with her Percival Gull, part of the Shuttleworth Collection, (Note: After the Second World War, the Gull was purchased from the RAF by the Percival Aircraft company which in 1961 passed it into the care of the Shuttleworth Collection.) joined the British Women Pilots' Association, and gave interviews for BBC radio and television. Although appearing outgoing, at least one acquaintance noted that her conversation largely consisted of herself and her past achievements. Another observed the dichotomy in her personality; introverted in private but extroverted at public events in her honour.

She went to Australia and New Zealand early the following year but initially kept a low profile. Batten only reunited with some of her family once they discovered she was in New Zealand; she had not let them know she was there until she was interviewed by a local newspaper. Initially staying in a hotel, she was later hosted by her nephews and niece and their families, although they soon found her demanding and inconsiderate. Once the public became aware she was in the country, she attended some events; one was the opening of a school in Māngere that was named for her. She became patron of the New Zealand Airwoman's Association and spoke at public gatherings. Most of her interviews were published in women's magazines and she gave few details of her lifestyle other than to allude to one of excitement and glamour.

Batten returned to England in April 1970 but shortly afterwards was invited to attend a fundraising banquet in Australia. The flight there and back would be provided at no cost by Qantas, and she quickly accepted the invitation. In Australia, she met with acquaintances, some of whom noted that she talked of little but her record-breaking flights rather than more recent events in her life. Peggy Kelman, the Australian aviator who had met Batten in the 1930s, later described conversations in which Batten admitted to being dominated by her mother. Kelman also flew a light aircraft with Batten as a passenger, and offered her the controls; Batten refused. She ended up staying in Australia for nearly three months, travelling across the country at the expense of Qantas and being hosted for free. Eventually, tired from her visit, she asked for a flight to Fiji to recuperate before going to the United States. There she did a tour at the behest of the Ninety-Nines, an association of female pilots, before returning to Tenerife in October.

For the next few years, Batten made occasional trips to England; she was an advocate of the Concorde supersonic airliner, having viewed the prototype back in 1969 and longed to fly in it to New Zealand. She made further visits to see its progress and wrote to newspapers in support of the project. Buoyed by the public response to the end of her seclusion, she loaned her papers and memorabilia to the RAF museum at Hendon for the purpose of establishing an archive although much material relating to her personal life, particularly correspondence with her family men with whom she had relationships, was filtered out. She also commenced writing her memoirs, which she titled Luck and the Record Breaker, intended for publication after her death.

In April 1977 she was guest of honour at the opening of the Aviation Pioneers Pavilion at Auckland's Museum of Transport and Technology (MOTAT). Acquaintances were startled at her appearance at this time; her hair had been dyed blonde and she appeared underweight. While in New Zealand, she became ill and stayed with the director of the MOTAT. The director, in the belief she had limited funds, sought financial relief from the government. As a result, she was granted NZ$1,000 along with a weekly state pension of NZ$46. However, unknown to anyone, she actually had enough assets to provide a comfortable standard of living. She later stayed with family before returning to Tenerife before the end of the year.

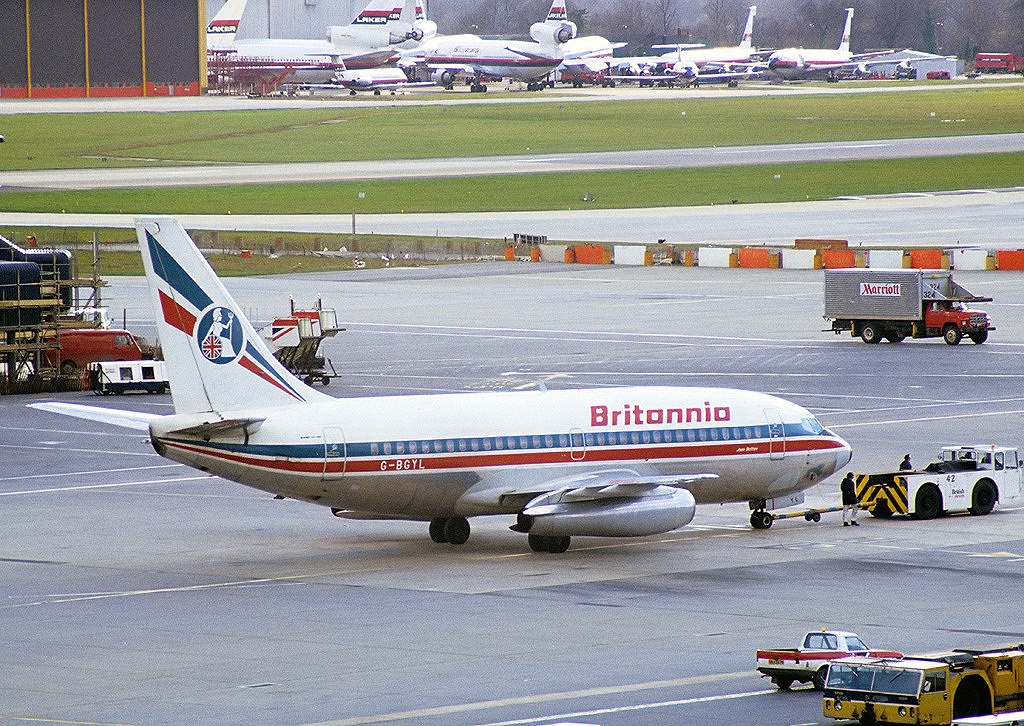
A Britannia Airways Boeing 737, which the airline named "Jean Batten"; she was present at the dedication ceremony in London in 1981

Batten was soon contacted by Robert Pooley, of Airlife Publishing, who wanted to republish her 1938 book My Life. She refused to update it, wanting to have her memoirs published separately later once they were completed. Organising the publication of her book, re-titled Alone in the Sky took two years. She returned to New Zealand in late 1979, flying partway on the Concorde, thanks to the generosity of the National Bank which invited her to open a new branch in her home country. She remained for the summer, doing promotional work for Alone in the Sky.

After spending the northern summer in Tenerife, Batten was in Australia in November 1980 for the 60th anniversary of the founding of Qantas. While there, her solo record for the England-Australia flight was broken by Judith Chisholm, an airline pilot, who flew a Cessna Centurion to achieve the feat. She then flew to Auckland on 25 November, breaking Batten's solo record for the England-New Zealand flight as well. As a courtesy, Qantas flew Batten on a Boeing 747 to Auckland to greet Chisholm. During the flight, made while Chisholm crossing the Tasman Sea, the two briefly spoke via radio. Batten publicly congratulated Chisholm for breaking her longstanding records, noting that her own flight was made "as a pioneer" and it could not be compared to Chisholm's. According to friends she later complained of the technological advantage that made the feat much easier to achieve. She was back in Tenerife in early 1981, her focus now on a Concorde return flight between England and New Zealand, being organised by Pooley to commemorate the 45th anniversary of her record flight of 1936. Scheduled to depart London in October with Batten as the guest of honour, tickets cost £3,450. She was engaged in publicity events to help ticket sales, one of which was a ceremony at Luton Airport where Britannia Airways named one of its Boeing 737 aircraft after her. Despite Batten's urging and berating of Pooley, the Concorde flight was cancelled in early October due to poor sales, much to her disappointment.

== Final years and death ==
In the spring of 1982, Batten sold her apartment in Tenerife. By this time, her neighbours found her increasingly eccentric and noted that she would go to extreme lengths to avoid personal interaction. Much of her personal papers and memorabilia, including her memoirs, were packaged into a suitcase and consigned to Britannia Airways at Luton Airport for her later collection. (Note: Batten's biographer discovered her unpublished memoirs in the suitcase during the course of his investigation into her death. Although they helped inform his biography of the aviator, he found them "disconnected", "unrevealing" and "egocentric".) She was in England in August, having spent some of the previous weeks in Gibraltar. Having caught up with Pooley, she informed him of her plan to look for property in Mallorca and avoid contact for a time. She left England in October, writing to her publisher on 8 November to advise of her temporary address in Mallorca and to query a taxation issue with her royalty payments for Alone in the Sky.

In November 1982, Batten, staying at a hotel in Mallorca, was bitten by a dog. Batten refused medical treatment but the wound became infected and she developed a pulmonary abscess. She died alone in her hotel room on 22 November from complications from the dog bite. There was some confusion as to her identity and she was not buried until 22 January 1983. She was interred in a communal pauper's grave under her middle name, Gardner, with 150 other people. Officials in Palma Majorca erred in not informing her family or the New Zealand Government.

While her family and acquaintances were used to her being regularly out of touch, over time there was increasing concern as to Batten's welfare. The letter that she had written to her publisher was the last anyone had heard from her as she had sent no further correspondence. Uncollected mail was building up at her poste restante and there had been no transactions on her bank account. In 1984, prompted by Pooley who had had no contact from Batten for some time, the New Zealand High Commission in London began a search for her but to no avail. Batten's reclusive nature and distant relationships hindered progress. By February 1987 official efforts to locate her had ceased. It was not until the following September that journalist Ian Mackersey discovered her fate as part of his research into a television documentary on her life. Batten's death and the circumstances of its discovery were widely reported. When her estate was probated, it was valued at nearly £100,000 (equivalent to £281,000 in 2020). As Batten's remains were buried in a communal grave in Palma, it was impractical to repatriate them to New Zealand as per her wishes. (Note: In her will, Batten had stipulated that she be cremated and her ashes interred at Auckland International Airport.) In 1988, a bronze plaque with a depiction of Batten and text in English and Spanish was placed at the grave site.

== Legacy ==
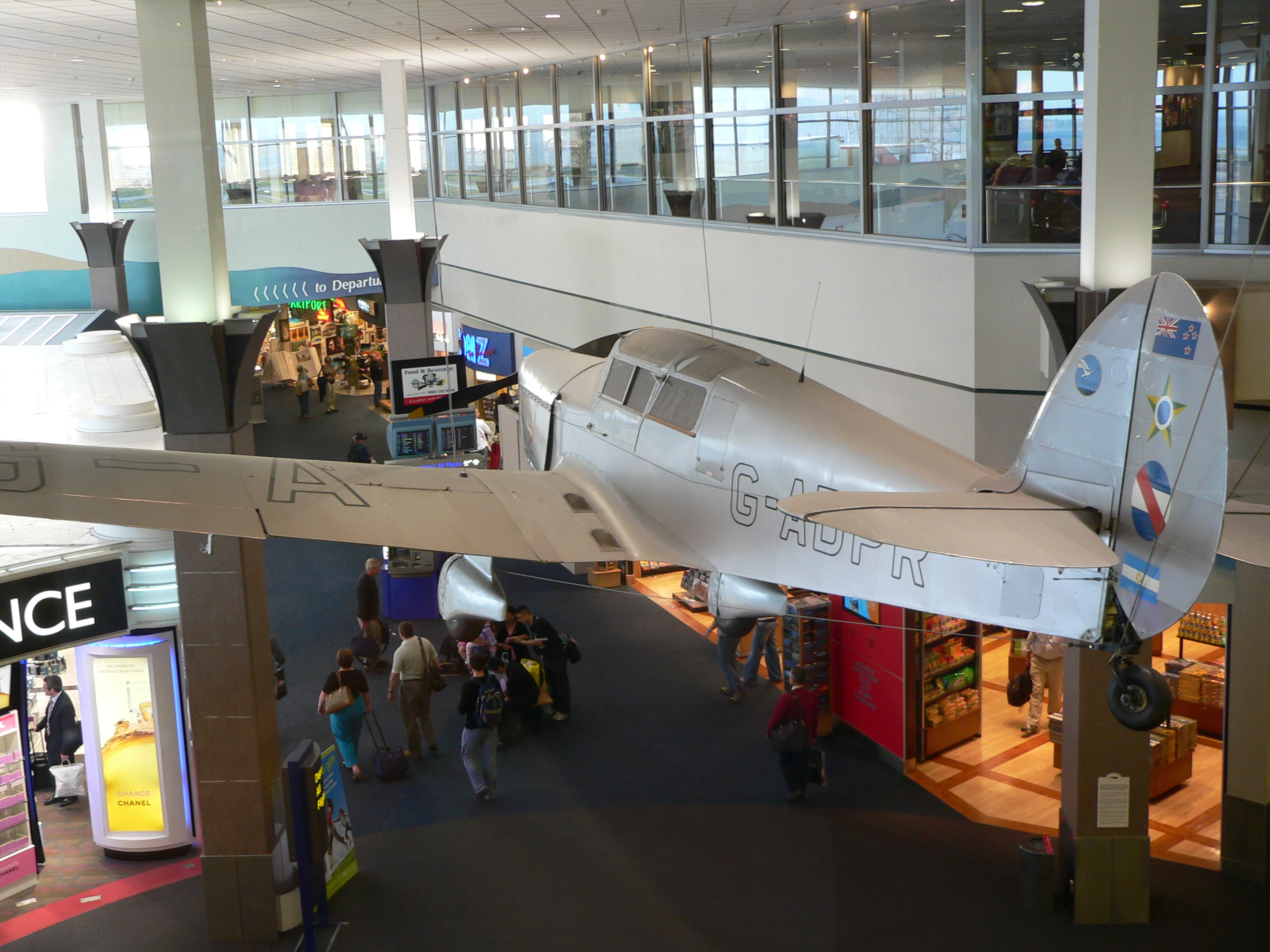
Batten's Gull on display at the Jean Batten Terminal at Auckland Airport

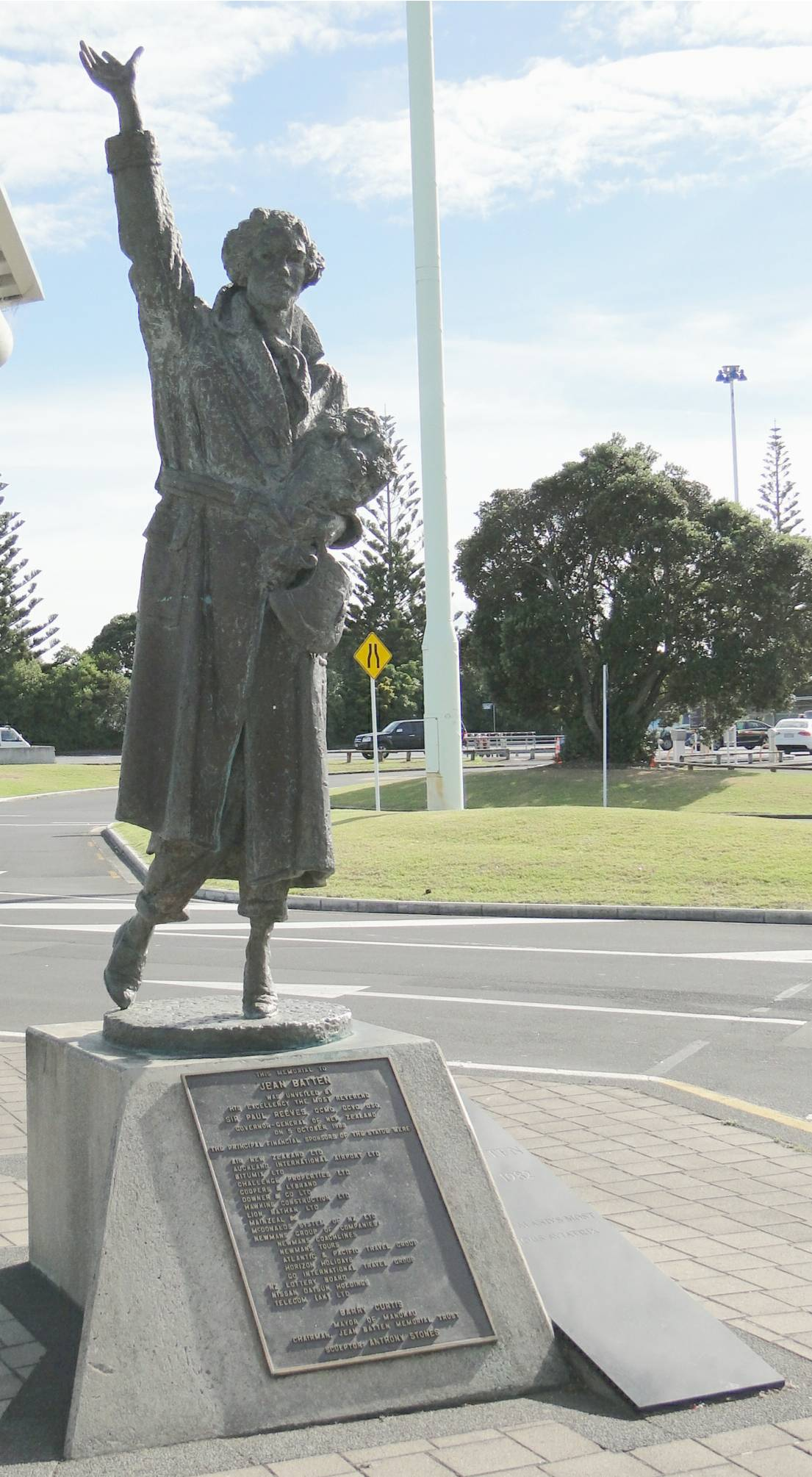
Statue of Jean Batten at Auckland Airport

Batten is considered to be New Zealand's most notable aviator and a better pilot than her contemporaries Amy Johnson and Amelia Earhart, particularly for navigation. The international terminal at the Auckland International Airport is named Jean Batten Terminal in her honour. A bronze statue of Batten was unveiled at the airport in November 1989, and the Percival Gull in which she made the first solo trip from England to New Zealand in 1936 is displayed in the terminal. (Note: The company operating Auckland Airport purchased the restored and airworthy Gull from the Shuttleworth Collection in 1995.) She was inducted into the New Zealand Sports Hall of Fame in 1990.

A primary school founded in 1970 in Māngere is named after her; Batten, in her will, left it money for use as competition prizes. The historic Jean Batten building in Auckland, which occupies the small block between Fort and Shortland Streets, is also bounded by Jean Batten Place. The building has a Historic Place Category 1 rating by Heritage New Zealand. A street in her birthplace of Rotorua is also named for her. A bronze sculpture of Batten is located in the main terminal of Rotorua Regional Airport, and memorial panels are installed in the building. A small park in the middle of the city is named after her, and the Jean Batten Memorial is located there. At 1,971 metres (6,467 ft), Jean Batten Peak in the Ailsa Mountains of Fiordland was named for her in 1939; she had visited the nearby Walter Peak Station, close to Lake Wakatipu.

In September 2009, a street in the area of Palma where Batten died was renamed Carrer de Jean Batten (Jean Batten Street).

== Major flights ==
- 8 May to 23 May 1934 – England–Australia (solo women's record) 16,900 kilometres (10,500 mi) in 14 days 22 hours 30 minutes, breaking Amy Johnson's record by over four days.
- 8 April to 29 April 1935 – Australia–England (solo women's record) in 17 days 16 hours 15 minutes. First woman ever to make a return flight.
- 11 November to 13 November 1935 – England–Brazil: 8,000 km (5,000 mi) in 61 hours 15 minutes, setting a world record for any type of aeroplane. Also fastest crossing South Atlantic Ocean, 13 hours 15 minutes, and first woman to make an England–South America flight.
- 5 October to 16 October 1936 – England–New Zealand 22,891 km (14,224 mi) in 11 days 45 minutes, including two days 12 hours in Sydney. World record for any type.
- 19 October to 24 October 1937 – Australia–England in 5 days 18 hours 15 minutes, giving her solo records simultaneously in both directions. Her last long-distance flight.
