= Jack Purvis =

Jack Purvis may refer to:

- Jack Purvis (musician) (1906–1962), American jazz musician
- Jack Purvis (actor) (1937–1997), British actor

== See also ==
- John Purvis (disambiguation)
