= John Purves =

John Purves may refer to:

- John Purves (ice hockey) (born 1968), Canadian ice hockey player
- John Purves (politician) (1847–1915), Australian politician
- John Archibald Purves (1870–1952), English electrical engineer
- John Todd Purves (fl. 2011–present), American basketball coach
- Tug John Purves, a museum boat

== See also ==
- John-Clay Purves (1825–1903), British geologist and museum curator
- Captain John Purves and His Wife (1775), a portrait by American painter Henry Benbridge
