= Robert Purvis (disambiguation) =

Robert Purvis (1810–1898), was an American abolitionist.

Robert Purvis, Bob Purvis, Rob Purvis, and other variations can also refer to:

- Bob Purvis (footballer) (born 1948), former Scottish footballer, played for Queen's Park
- Bob Purvis (songwriter) (Robert J. Purvis), member of the 1970s British musical group Splinter (band)
- Bob Purvis, UKIP candidate for the Spennymoor by-election in 2019, Durham County Council elections
- Bob Purvis Sr (Robert H. Purvis) and his son Bob Purvis Jr (after whom Purvis banks were named), both lessees of Woodgreen Station, a cattle station in the Northern Territory of Australia
- Rob Purvis, baseball player in the 1999 Major League Baseball draft
- Robert Henry Purvis (c1885 - 1965) bush worker and pastoralist at Woodgreen Station
- Robert Purvis (musical director), faculty at the Arden School of Theatre
- Robert Purvis (politician) (1844–1920), British barrister and Liberal Unionist politician
