= Jean Batten Memorial =

Memorial in Rotorua, New Zealand

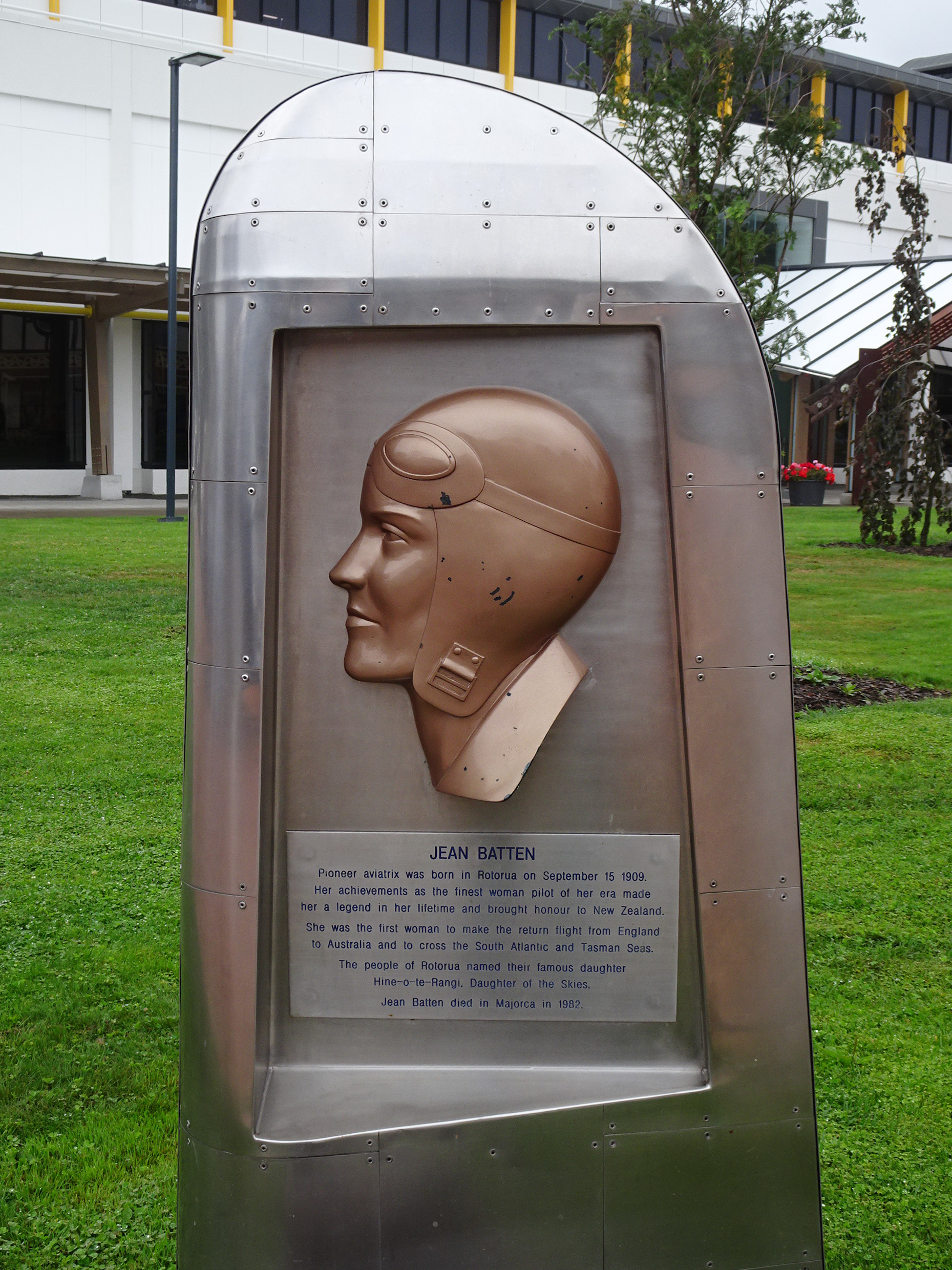
- Artist: Marshall Watt
- Year: 1994
- Type: bronze and steel
- Location: Rotorua, New Zealand; 38°08′08″S 176°15′13″E

The Jean Batten Memorial is located in Jean Batten Square in Rotorua, New Zealand and honours the life of pioneer aviator Jean Batten, who was born in Rotorua.

The memorial was created by Hamilton artist Marshall Watt and gifted to the Rotorua Museum in 1994. The memorial was later installed in the park on Arawa Street between Tourism Rotorua and the District Library. The memorial is designed as a steel aeroplane wing with a bronze relief of Batten's head.
