= Statue of Jean Batten =

Public sculpture in New Zealand

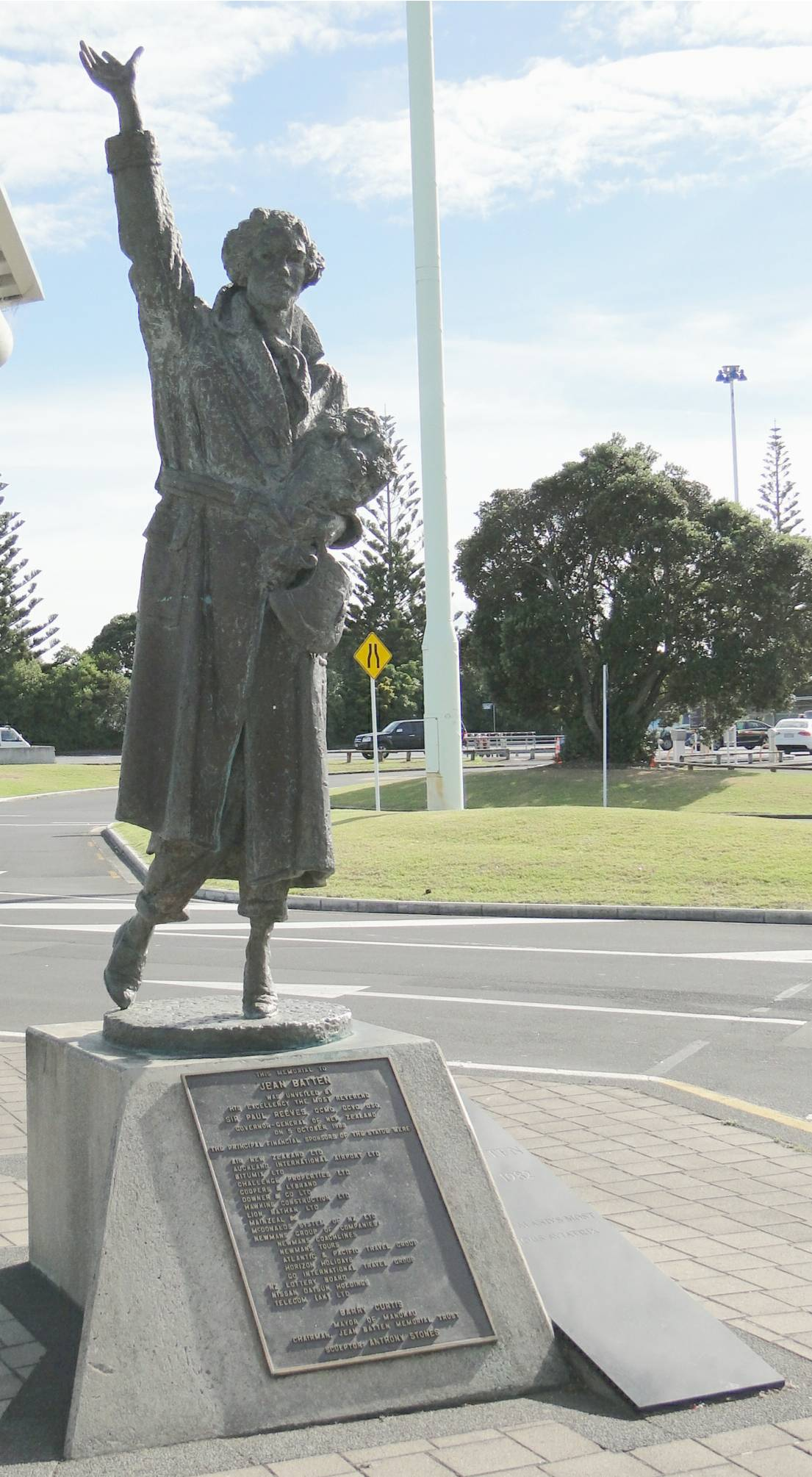
- Artist: Anthony Stones
- Year: 1989
- Type: bronze
- Location: Auckland, New Zealand; 37°00′16″S 174°46′56″E

The Statue of Jean Batten is located outside Auckland International Airport, New Zealand, and honours the life of New Zealand aviator Jean Batten.

The bronze statue is the work of Anthony Stones. It was unveiled on 5 October 1989 by the Governor-General of New Zealand, Sir Paul Reeves. It depicts Batten holding flowers in her left arm and waving with her right.
