= T. G. Purvis =

English painter

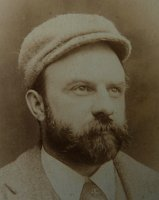
T G Purvis, ca. 1895

T G Purvis (12 April 1861 – 17 January 1933) was a British marine artist. A sea captain who turned to painting, he was a prolific painter of ship portraits and marine scenes from the early 1890s to the late 1920s. His paintings can be found in a number of public collections, notably the National Maritime Museum and the National Museum of Wales.

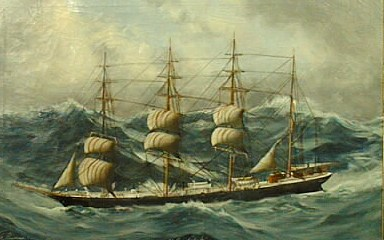
The Wandsbek, oil by T G Purvis, ca. 1900

== Life ==
Thomas George Purvis (professionally known as T G Purvis) was born in Chirton, Northumberland, on 12 April 1861. He was the only child of the then 46-year-old Jane Scott, daughter of a master mariner, and her husband, Thomas Joseph Purvis (1821–86), a blockmaker born in Alnwick.

Purvis went to sea as an apprentice in December 1878, working his way up to obtain his Master's certificate in August 1887. He sailed on a variety of steam and sailing vessels; the latter including two and a half years on the bark Arabella and a voyage to Australia in the Dundee-built clipper, La Escocesa. In 1886, he married Grace Elizabeth Dodgin (1861-1948), eldest daughter of shipbuilder and marine engineer Charles William Dodgin (1839-1917).

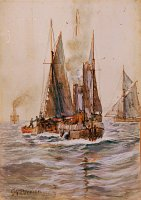
Watercolour by T G Purvis, 1902

As a ship's captain, T G could only find employment delivering new small steamships to South America, and he gave this up in July 1891 to become a full-time painter; he had already described himself as "marine artist" in the census earlier that year.

From this time until the beginning of the First World War he was a prolific painter, mainly of ship portraits, though probably his best paintings are those where he was not constrained by the conventions of ship portraiture.

By 1888, when his oldest son Tom Purvis was born, he was living in Bristol. He moved in early 1894 to Cardiff, where he for a time also ran a photographic studio, and was still there in 1902. Soon after, he moved to Blackheath, London. He was in Blackheath when his son Tom started at Camberwell School of Art in ca. 1904. By the outbreak of the First World War, the great sailing ships Purvis loved to paint were in decline. In 1915 he moved to the Far East, leaving his family behind, and took employment as mate or master of various steamships, at least until 1925. Meanwhile, he continued to paint. Purvis died in Hong Kong on 17 January 1933, after an accident.

== Family ==
His five children all showed artistic talent in varying degrees, especially his oldest son, Tom Purvis (1888-1959), who became one of the most distinguished and distinctive of 20th century poster artists.
