= Pervis =

Pervis may refer to:

- Pervis Atkins (1935–2017), American National Football League player and actor
- Pervis Ellison (born 1967), American former National Basketball Association player
- Pervis Estupiñán (born 1998), Ecuadorian footballer
- Pervis Jackson (1938–2008), American R&B singer, a founding member of and the bass singer for The Spinners
- Pervis Spann (1932–2022), American broadcaster, music promoter and radio disc jockey
- Pervis Staples (1935–2021), a member of The Staple Singers, an American gospel, soul, and R&B singing group
- Pervis Ferris Young (1928–2003), magistrate of the British Overseas Territory of Pitcairn Island
- François Pervis (born 1984), French track cyclist

== See also ==
- Purvis (disambiguation)
- Purves (disambiguation)
