= National Savings Movement =

British financial movement between 1916 and 1978

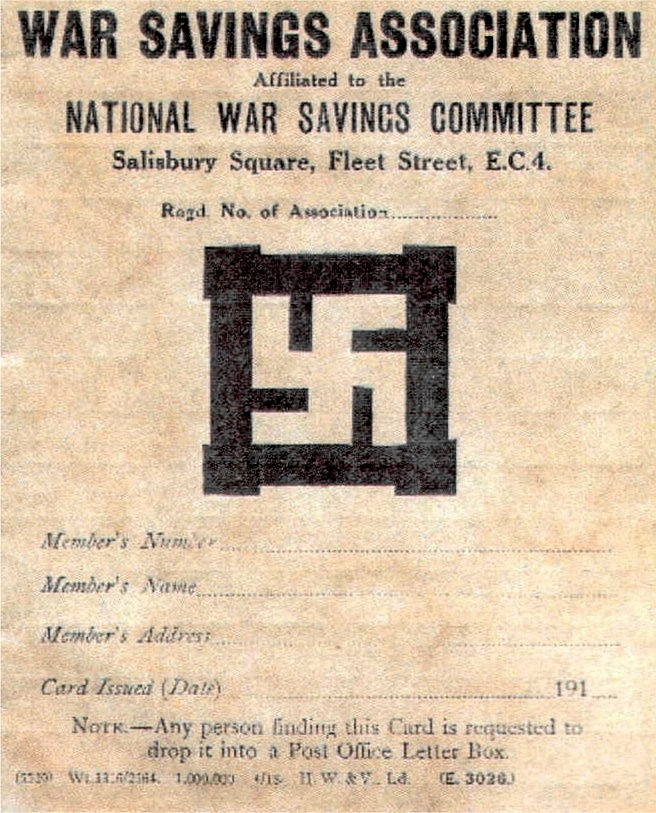
A World War I savings card showing the Swastika symbol subsequently abandoned by the movement.

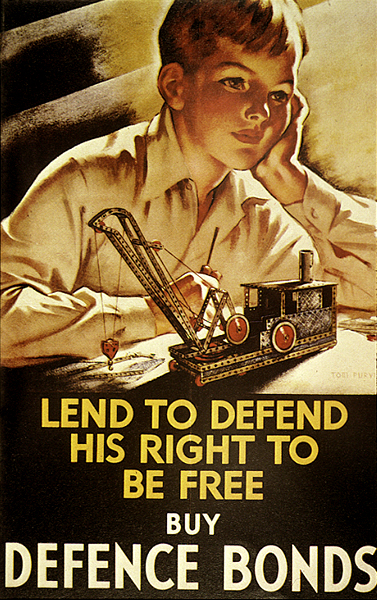
A 1940 poster by Tom Purvis for the National Savings Committee.

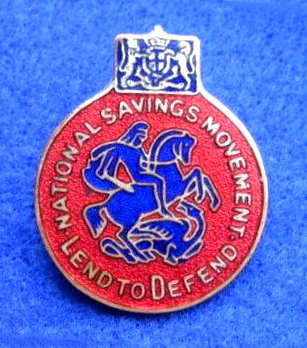
A World War II badge showing St. George and the Dragon and the slogan "Lend to Defend".

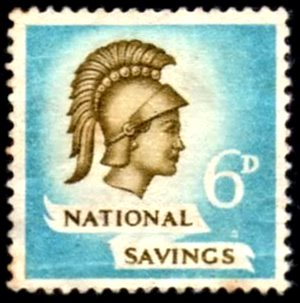
A British 1951 savings stamp.

The National Savings Movement was a British mass savings movement that operated between 1916 and 1978 and was used to finance the deficit of government spending over tax revenues. The movement was instrumental during World War II in raising funds to support the war effort. In peacetime the movement provided an easy and safe way for ordinary people to save small sums of money. The movement grew to around 7 million members before ceasing during the 1970s as more modern methods of saving took over. Savings products promoted by the movement typically offered a low level of return but the safety of a government guarantee.

== History ==
The movement was created in March 1916 as the National Savings Committee and this was supplemented by volunteer local committees and paid civil servants. A number of different organisations were loosely affiliated to make up the movement, including the Trustees Savings Banks and National Savings (previously the Post Office Savings Bank).

By 1946, the movement employed 1190 civil servants at an annual cost of £1.5 million, excluding unpaid volunteers. The amount raised by the movement at that time was £105,000 per week compared with £5 million in 1943.

According to a parliamentary answer, in 1950 there were about 185,000 local National Savings groups with a membership of about 7,000,000. The amount of small savings invested was over £6,100 million. The Trustee Savings Banks funds had reached £1,000 million.

On 30 March 1966, a ceremony was held at the London Guildhall to celebrate the 50th anniversary of the founding of the movement, which was attended by Queen Elizabeth II.

On 30 July 1976, the government announced that all 580 civil servants who supported the otherwise voluntary movement would be withdrawn over two years as part of public spending cuts. Without this administrative support the movement was unable to function, and its National Committee met for the last time on 16 February 1978. Attempts to restructure the movement into a more general money management service had failed because of a lack of financial support from the government and the banking industry.

== Campaigns ==
The movement was particularly active during wartime, when government spending was heightened. During World War II a War Savings Campaign was set up by the War Office to support the war effort. Local savings weeks were held which were promoted with posters with titles such as "Lend to Defend the Right to be Free", "Save your way to Victory" and "War Savings are Warships".

== Symbols ==
One of the early symbols of the movement was the swastika, (Note: See image above.) but this was replaced with an image of St. George slaying the dragon before the start of the Second World War after the swastika was adopted by Nazi Germany.

== Records ==
Archives of local savings committees may sometimes be found in local county archives, including in Wales, Essex, Walsall and others.

== Ephemera ==
A wide range of printed and other ephemera exist for the movement including leaflets, membership certificates, posters in the popular styles of the period, savings stamps and enamel badges awarded to members for long service.

== See also ==
- Liberty bond
- National Savings & Investments
- War bond
