= Herbert Purves =

New Zealand medical researcher (1908–1993)

Herbert Dudley Purves CMG (25 September 1908 – 15 April 1993) was a New Zealand academic, medical researcher and scientist.

== Biography ==
He was educated at Hastings West Primary School and Napier Boys' High School. Purves' academic strengths showed early as he received prizes for science in the third form, for mathematics in the fourth form, and for Latin, mathematics and science in the lower 6th. He won the Isabella Siteman scholarship, which was awarded to the highest-ranking Hawkes Bay student who did not make the scholarship list. The scholarship required Purves to study science or medicine at the University of Otago. In 1926, he travelled to Dunedin to study physics, chemistry and mathematics. He majored in chemistry, earning a BSc in 1928 and an MSc with first-class honours in chemistry in 1931.

Purves' working life was spent in full-time medical research at the University of Otago Medical School in Dunedin. He began in 1932, as a research assistant to Sir Charles Hercus, then professor of bacteriology and public health.

Purves was later supported by funds from a Medical Research Council grant for research into thyroid problems, administered by a committee headed by Sir Charles Hercus. Hercus encouraged Purves to take the medical course, which he did between 1935 and 1941 when he graduated MB/ChB.

In 1941 Purves became principal research officer and director of the New Zealand Medical Research Council's Thyroid Research Department in Dunedin, which later became the Endocrinology Research Unit. In 1968, the unit became the Laboratory of Experimental Endocrinology and Metabolism, and in 1971, the Neuroendocrinology Group. Purves played a leading role in the abolition of thyroid enlargement (goitre) which once disfigured nearly 20% of the population.

Purves' merits were recognised by his colleagues in Dunedin, who made him president of the University of Otago Medical Research Society in 1955 and upon his retirement, a life member of the society. The endocrinologists of New Zealand elected him president of the New Zealand Society of Endocrinology from 1963 to 1968, and his colleagues abroad conferred on him the title of distinguished thyroid scientist at the seventh International Thyroid Conference in 1975.

== Honours and awards ==
In 1967, Purves was elected a Fellow of the Royal Society of New Zealand. He was elected a Fellow of the Royal Australasian College of Physicians in 1970, and in 1972 he was conferred with an honorary DSc by the University of Otago.

In the 1974 Queen's Birthday Honours, Purves was appointed a Companion of the Order of St Michael and St George, for services to medicine. In 1987, on the occasion of the 50th anniversary celebration of the Medical Research Council the governor-general, Sir Paul Reeves, presented Purves with a special silver medal in recognition of his outstanding contribution to medical research.

== Death ==
He died on 15 April 1993, aged 84, after a long illness.

== Family ==
Purves married Daphne Helen Cowie in 1939. She survived him as did their two daughters and one son.
