= John Purvis =

John Purvis may refer to:

- John Purvis (politician) (1938–2022), Conservative MEP for Mid Scotland and Fife
- John Gordon Purvis (born 1942), man who spent nine years in prison for a murder he did not commit
- John Stanley Purvis (1890–1968), British clergyman, archivist, poet, and artist
