= Purvis Glacier =

Glacier in Antarctica

- Location within South Georgia Island
- Location: South Georgia
- Coordinates: 54°6′S 37°10′W
- Thickness: unknown
- Terminus: Possession Bay
- Status: unknown

Purvis Glacier (54°6′S 37°10′W) is a glacier flowing generally northeast into the west side of Possession Bay, on the north coast of South Georgia. Charted by the German Antarctic Expedition under Wilhelm Filchner, 1911–12, and named after John Murray-Gletscher. It was renamed Purvis Glacier, possibly to avoid confusion with Murray Glacier in northern Victoria Land, after Petty Officer J. Purvis, Royal Navy (Point Purvis, q.v.).

== See also ==
- List of glaciers in the Antarctic
- Glaciology
