= Daphne Purves =

New Zealand educationalist

Dame Daphne Helen Purves DBE (née Cowie; 8 November 1908 – 14 October 2008) was a New Zealand educationalist. She was the first New Zealander to serve as president of the International Federation of University Women.

== Career ==
Purves saw education as the key to better conditions for women worldwide; and the passion of her life was the International Federation of University Women of which she was president for three years from 1977. She was a teacher at Waitaki Girls' High School, Otago Girls' High School and Otago Boys' High School, and lectured at Dunedin Teachers' College.

In the 1979 Queen's Birthday Honours, Purves was appointed a Dame Commander of the Order of the British Empire, for services to the International and New Zealand Federations of University Women.

== Personal life ==
Daphne Helen Cowie married Herbert Dudley Purves in 1939. She died in hospital on 14 October 2008 aged 99, three weeks short of her 100th birthday, and was survived by her two daughters, Hilary Helen and Elizabeth Celia, and one son, Robert Dudley Purves. At the time of her death, Purves was New Zealand's oldest living dame.

== IFUW Grant ==
The IFUW offers a Daphne Purves Grant to help women graduates to obtain specialised training and to carry out independent research in any country for a minimum period of two (2) months of work.

== Biography ==
Nothing Like A Dame: A Biography of Dame Daphne Purves by Anderson, Molly (ISBN 1-877161-50-0)
