= Bob Purvis =

Scottish footballer

Personal information
- Full name: Robert Davis Purvis
- Date of birth: 4 April 1948 (age 78)
- Place of birth: Dunfermline, Scotland
- Position: Goalkeeper

Youth career
- Edinburgh University

Senior career*
Years	Team	Apps	(Gls)
1970–1972	Queen's Park	46	(0)

International career
1969–1972	Scotland Amateurs	8	(0)
- * Club domestic league appearances and goals

Robert Davis Purvis (born 4 April 1948) is a Scottish retired footballer who played in the Scottish League for Queen's Park as a goalkeeper. He was capped by Scotland at amateur level.
