= Tom Purvis =

English artist

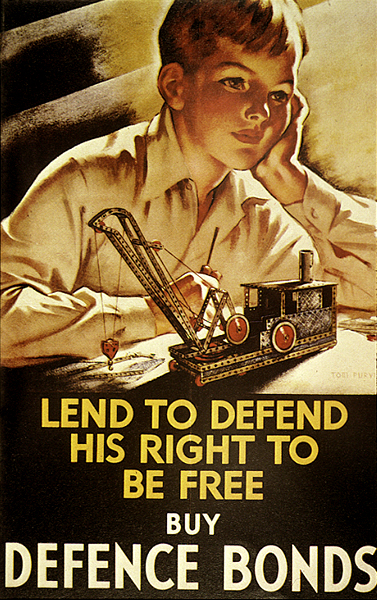
A 1940 poster by Tom Purvis for the National Savings Committee.

Tom Purvis (12 June 1888 – 27 August 1959) was an English painter and commercial poster artist. His work was part of the art competitions at the 1928 Summer Olympics and the 1932 Summer Olympics.

== Early life ==
Purvis was born in Bristol, the son of sailor and marine artist T G Purvis. He studied at Camberwell School of Art and worked for six years at the advertising firm of Mather & Crowther before becoming a freelance designer. Purvis developed a bold, two-dimensional style using large blocks of vivid flat colour and eliminating detail. He fought in the First World War in the Artists Rifles

== London and North Eastern Railway ==
From 1923 to 1943 Purvis worked for the London & North Eastern Railway (LNER) under the direction of Advertising Manager William Teasdale and then his successor Charles Dandridge, who both allowed him considerable freedom in his designs. During his time at the LNER Purvis produced over 100 posters, around 5-6 per year or one every two months. He enjoyed a very high status in the LNER's advertising department as he was one of the major designers involved in the recognisable bold and graphic LNER poster style. He was so important to the LNER that he was paid a retainer of approximately £450 per annum to carry out his work.

His posters for the LNER largely avoided depictions of the trains themselves but rather concentrated on portraying the resorts that were the holiday destinations of travelers and the leisure pursuits that could be enjoyed there. Sex appeal was quite a strong element of Purvis's work, with many posters portraying women in bathing costumes with bare arms and legs—quite risqué in 1930's Britain! As well as individual posters, Purvis also produced two sets of six posters for the LNER that could either stand alone or be joined to produce a single, overall image. The ... by LNER series portrays six seaside resorts, each shown at an unusual angle, to form a continuous landscape in the background as the posters, like the trains themselves, travel up the east coast of Britain from Essex to Suffolk, Lincolnshire, Yorkshire and finally Northumberland. The East Coast Joys set, depicting various leisure activities, has a relaxed, simplified style and the warm colours give it an almost Mediterranean feel, emphasising that the east coast is 'the drier side of Britain'.

== Other work ==
As well as his work for the LNER, Purvis also designed posters for the Gentlemans' outfitters Austin Reed and for the 1932 British Industries Fair. In 1930 he joined the Society of Industrial Artists, a group which put pressure on industry to improve standards of training for graphic designers and provide a wider range of employment for them. In 1936 Purvis became one of the first Royal Designers for Industry.

He created the "It's Up to You" poster of Britannia, standing by the Union Jack, during the Second World War, but gave up poster design after the war to paint portraits and religious pictures.

== Publications ==
- "Introduction", Poster Progress. The Studio Ltd, 1937.
