= James Purves =

James Purves may refer to:

- James Purves (minister) (1734–1795), Scottish universalist minister
- James Purves (politician) (1843–1910), Australian politician
- J. R. W. Purves (James Richard William Purves, 1903–1979), Australian lawyer and philatelist
- James Purves (cricketer) (1937–2022), English cricketer
