= John Gordon Purvis =

- Born: 1942 (age 83–84); Fort Lauderdale, Florida, U.S.
- Known for: Being imprisoned for nine years for a murder he did not commit

John Gordon Purvis Jr. (born 1942) is an American man who spent nine years in prison for a murder he did not commit.

== Early life ==
John Purvis was born to John and Emma Jo Purvis in 1942. His father died on February 20, 1945, with the U.S. Marines on Iwo Jima in World War II. His mother was devastated, and it seemed to have an effect on Purvis, who had physical problems of his own. At six years old, he would cry and become terrified to go to school and hold his mother. At school, he always sat near the teacher, and if fights broke out between students at school he would cry or do his best to avoid them.

As he grew up, he could not keep up with his peers academically and his relationships with girls was shaky at best. A doctor diagnosed him with chronic undifferentiated schizophrenia. He would spend his time watching television or eating out with his mother and stepbrother Mike Bartlett. Occasionally, Purvis would suffer panic attacks. He was known for his unusual behavior.

== The murder of Susan Hamwi ==
A woman named Susan Hamwi had moved out to Fort Lauderdale, Florida, in July 1983. She was working on her divorce from her husband Paul Hamwi for his abuse. Paul Hamwi was a Vietnam veteran, known for his drinking and obnoxiousness. Susan's friend, Karen Bebee, urged her not to involve herself with him. But Paul and Susan had unprotected sex one night and Susan was pregnant. Paul, in marrying Susan, made her sign a pre-nuptial agreement that required him to pay her nothing upon divorce. Shortly after the marriage, their daughter Shane was born. Upon the divorce proceedings, the pre-nuptial agreement was declared void, since it was made under duress. Paul was then ordered to pay between $150,000 and $180,000 to Susan to support their daughter.

Purvis met Susan Hamwi, hoping to establish friendly contact. He was very unusual, but friendly with her. Hamwi was bothered to some degree with Purvis's behavior, but not to the point of rejecting him altogether.

On November 1, 1983, after a phone call from a friend, Susan was not heard from again. Neighbors began to express concern. On November 8, 1983, the body of Susan Hamwi was found at her home, with part of a knife. She had been stabbed and strangled with a phone cord. Shane Hamwi was also found dead from neglect.

Police detectives Rick Rice and Rich Martin of the Fort Lauderdale Police Department interviewed several people. Under great pressure from the media for a suspect in this gruesome murder, they turned to Johnny Purvis, the town "weirdo". They yelled and intimidated him at his interrogation and his mother heard it. Purvis was very shaken by the experience, and his mother was determined that he would talk to the police no more. But the detectives, undeterred by the fact that their forensic investigations showed Purvis was not at the crime scene, were determined to make Purvis confess. They picked a time when Purvis was not with his mother and Purvis confessed to Hamwi's murder. Represented by attorney Richard Kirsch, at Purvis's trial the taped confession to police was declared inadmissible by Judge Thomas Coker. But the jurors were not convinced of Purvis's innocence and declared him guilty based on the confession to psychiatrist Joel Klass. He was sentenced to life imprisonment.

== A new investigation ==
Although attorney Kirsch lost appeals in the courts and Purvis spent time in prison, an Aspen, Colorado, a detective named Gary White put the first crack in the Hamwi murder, when a woman beaten by Robert Wayne Beckett Jr. said that she'd heard him boast that his father, Robert Wayne Beckett Sr., had killed a girl in Florida. White remembered the Hamwi case and had private detective Barbara Barton assist in checking this out.

Rick Rice and Rich Martin, who had helped get Purvis convicted, weren't interested in this new lead in the Hamwi case. He was imprisoned for several years before two new detectives, Tim Bronson and Bob Williams, were assigned to the homicide section of the Fort Lauderdale Police Department. They were looking at some old cases and were shocked when they found that detectives Rice and Martin had not investigated the Robert Beckett Jr. boast of his father killing a girl in Florida, and the Hamwi investigation was on again. Through the painful and sometimes unwilling cooperation of Robert Wayne Beckett Sr., Beckett admitted to the murder of Susan Hamwi and that Paul Serio was the other murderer. The baby, Shane Hamwi, had been left neglected. He explained that Paul Hamwi had paid the two of them $14,000 to murder Susan.

== Release ==
Johnny Purvis was released from custody on January 15, 1993. But he had his problems psychologically and had to undergo extensive psychiatric treatment after his release. He continues to live in Florida and the treatment has helped him. A lawsuit against the prosecutor for failing to disclose exculpatory information was dismissed on grounds of "prosecutorial immunity."

== See also ==
- List of wrongful convictions in the United States
