= Point Purvis =

Geographical feature on South Georgia Island

Point Purvis (54°10′S 36°41′W) is a point lying 1 nautical mile (1.9 km) southwest of Tonsberg Point in Husvik Harbor, South Georgia. Charted by DI in 1928 and named after Petty Officer J. Purvis, Royal Navy (Purvis Glacier, q.v.), a member of the DI hydrographic survey party in this area in the motorboat Alert, 1928–30.
