= John-Clay Purves =

- Born: 30 January 1825; Coldstream, Scotland
- Died: 26 July 1903 (aged 78)
- Occupations: Geologist and Curator

John-Clay Purves MD (30 January 1825–26 July 1903) was a British geologist and museum curator.

== Biography ==
Purves initially qualified in medicine at the University of Edinburgh before joining the army and travelling as an army doctor. He had spent a couple of years working for the Geological Survey in Scotland before joining the Yorkshire Museum in 1878. He was initially employed as a temporary assistant to the museum before being made permanent Keeper following the death of the sub-curator Henry Baines. He resigned this post in 1880 following his appointment to the Geological Survey of Belgium.

In his subsequent geological career he is attributed with naming the Namurian; a stage in the regional stratigraphy of northwest Europe with an age between roughly 326 and 313 Ma (million years ago).

== Publications ==
- PURVES, J.C., 1881. 'Sur la délimitation et la constitution de l’étage houiller inférieur de la Belgique'. Bulletin de l’Académie royale de Belgique, Classe des Sciences, 3° série, 2: 514–568.
- PURVES, J.C., 1883. 'Terrain houiller'. In: Dupont, E.; Mourlon, M. & Purves, J.C., Explication de la feuille de Natoye. Musée royal d’Histoire naturelle, Explication de la Carte géologique du Royaume: 1–50
