= Somnus (mountain) =

Mountain in New Zealand

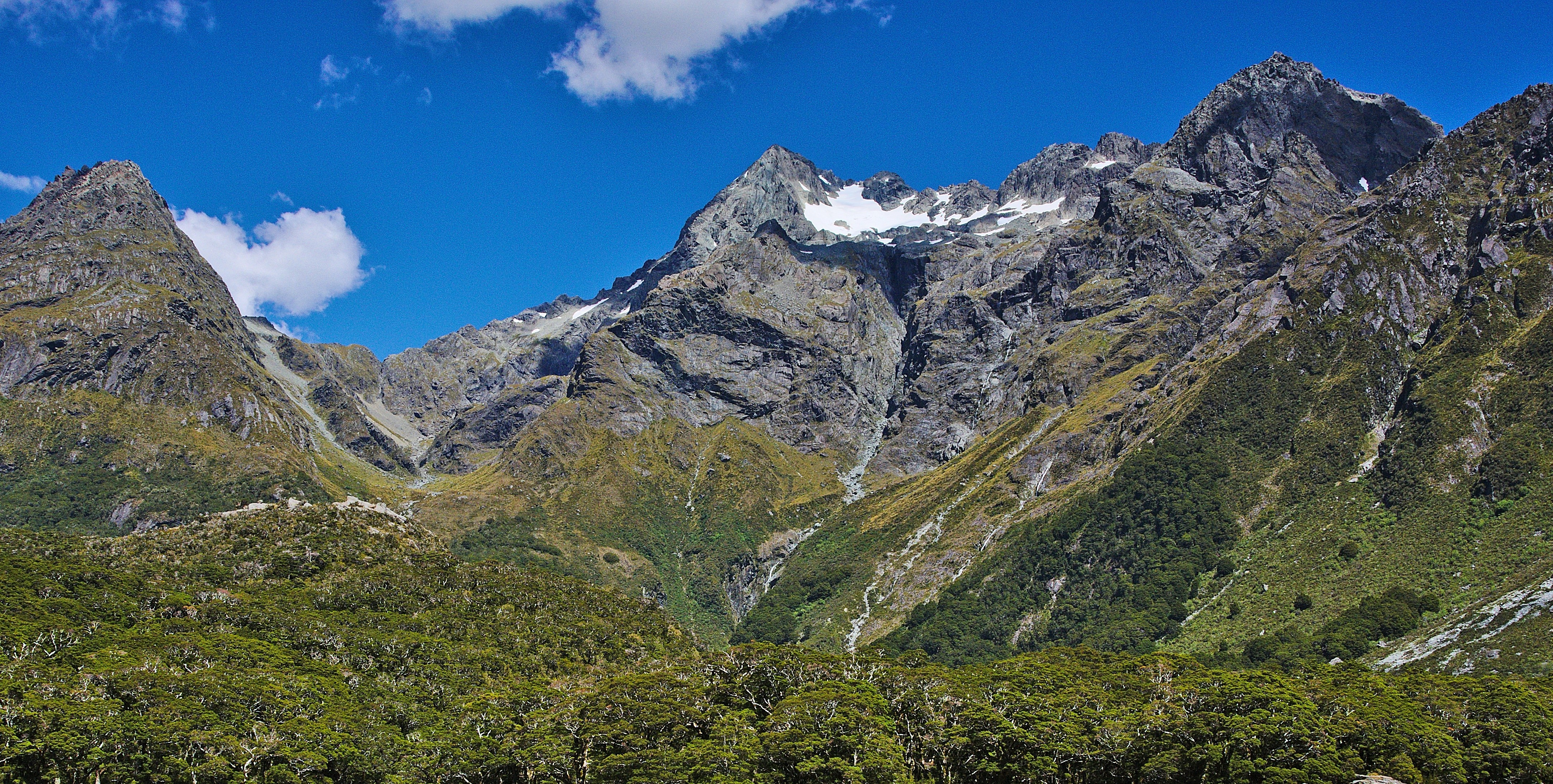
- North aspect

Highest point
- Elevation: 2,293 m (7,523 ft)
- Prominence: 1,038 m (3,406 ft)
- Isolation: 12.58 km (7.82 mi)
- Coordinates: 44.664331°S 168.220897°E

Naming
- Etymology: Somnus

Geography
- Location within New Zealand
- Interactive map of Somnus
- Location: South Island
- Country: New Zealand
- Region: Otago
- Protected area: Mount Aspiring National Park
- Parent range: Southern Alps; Humboldt Mountains
- Topo map(s): NZMS260 E40; Topo50 CB09

Climbing
- Easiest route: South Ridge

Somnus is a 2,293-metre-elevation (7,523-foot) mountain in Otago, New Zealand.

== Description ==
Somnus is the second-highest peak in the Humboldt Mountains which are a subrange of the Southern Alps. It is set within Mount Aspiring National Park which is part of the Te Wahipounamu UNESCO World Heritage Site on the South Island. Precipitation runoff from the mountain's slopes drains east into Rock Burn and west to Route Burn which are both tributaries of the Dart River / Te Awa Whakatipu. Topographic relief is significant as the summit rises 1,600 metres (5,249 feet) above Rock Burn in three kilometres, and 1,300 metres (4,265 feet) above the North Branch of Route Burn in two kilometres. This mountain is named for Somnus, the god of sleep in Roman mythology. Somnus is part of a region of peaks which share a mythology-related naming theme: Tantalus Peak, Poseidon Peak, Mount Chaos, Momus, and Nereus Peak.

== Climate ==
Based on the Köppen climate classification, Somnus is located in a marine west coast climate zone. Prevailing westerly winds blow moist air from the Tasman Sea onto the mountain, where the air is forced upwards by the mountains (orographic lift), causing moisture to drop in the form of rain and snow. This climate supports an unnamed glacier on the south slope. The months of December through February offer the most favourable weather for viewing or climbing this peak.

== Climbing ==
Climbing routes with first ascents:

- Somnus Couloir – F. Wright, J. Robertson – (1920)
- North East Buttress – Ben Dare – (2014)
- Somnthing (North East Face) – Penzy Dinsdale, Sooji Clarkson – (2024)
- Battle of the Somne (North East Face) – Ruari Macfarlane, Sooji Clarkson – (2024)
- South Ridge – FA unknown
- North Ridge – FA unknown

== Gallery ==
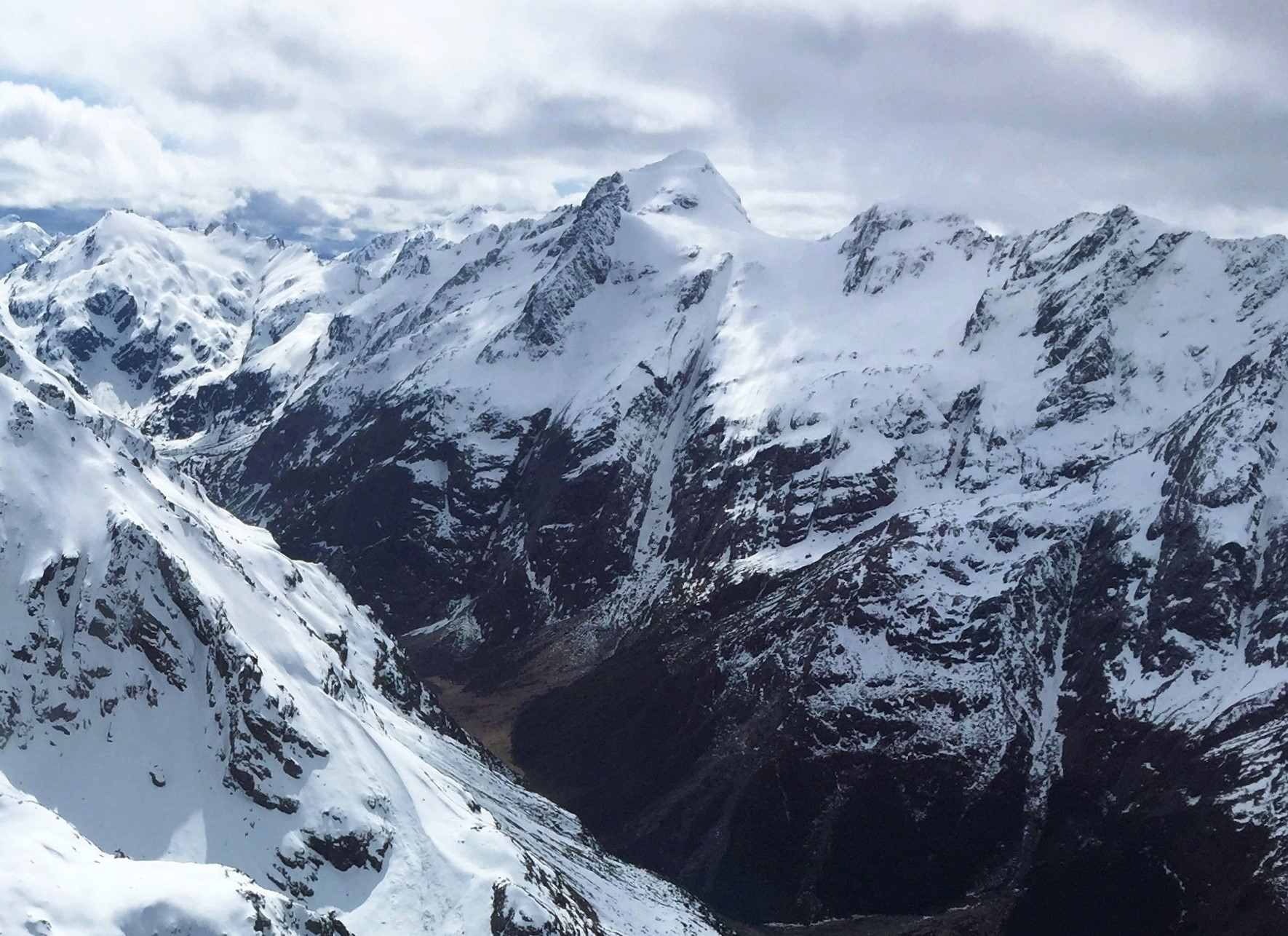
Aerial view of south aspect

== See also ==
- List of mountains of New Zealand by height
