= Jean Batten Peak =

Mountain in Otago, New Zealand

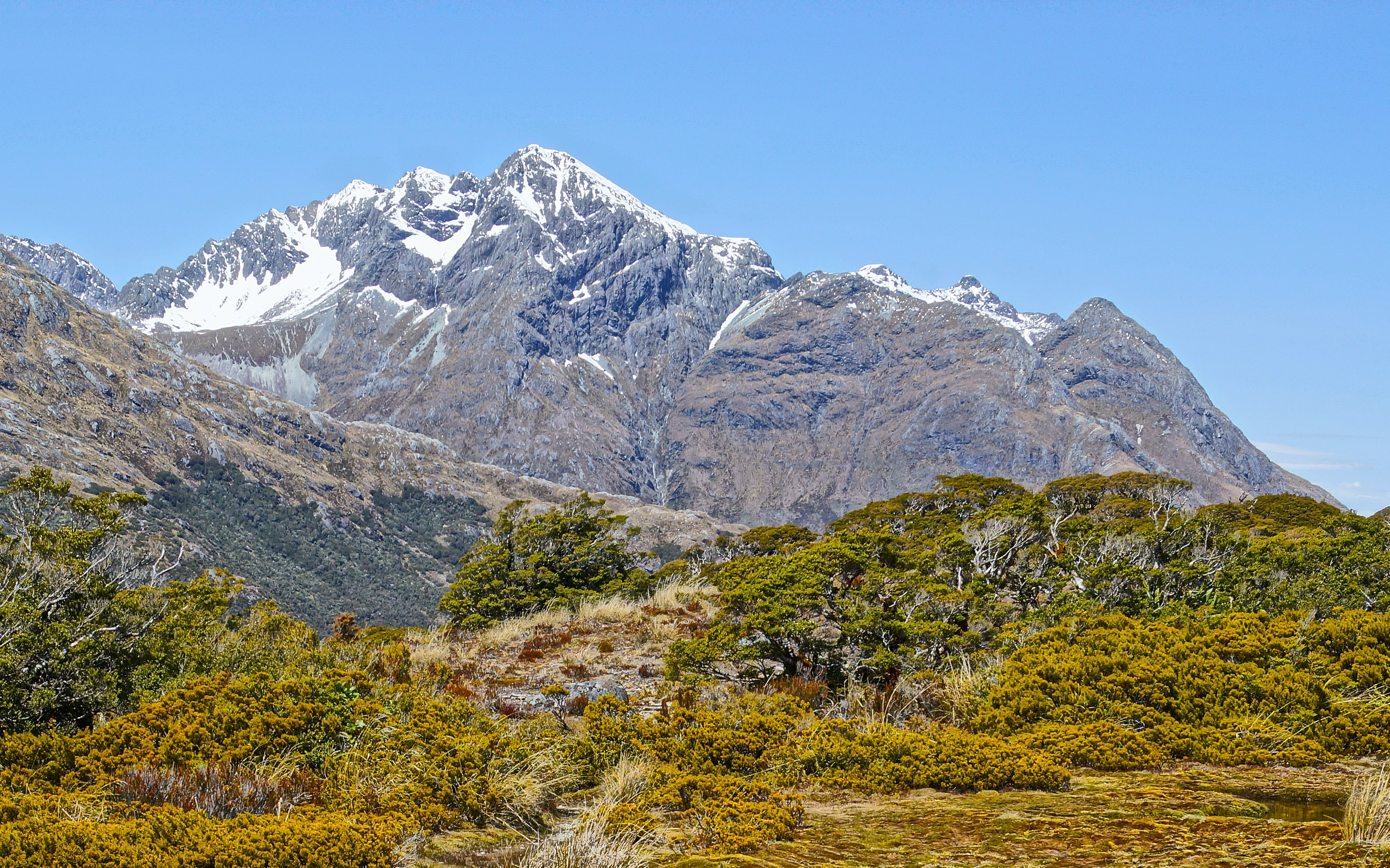
- Northwest aspect

Highest point
- Elevation: 1,971 m (6,467 ft)
- Prominence: 211 m (692 ft)
- Isolation: 2.11 km (1.31 mi)
- Coordinates: 44°51′31″S 168°10′24″E

Naming
- Etymology: Jean Batten

Geography
- Location within New Zealand
- Interactive map of Jean Batten Peak
- Location: South Island
- Country: New Zealand
- Region: Otago
- Parent range: Ailsa Mountains
- Topo map: NZTopo50 CB09

Geology
- Rock type: Sedimentary rock (Sandstone)

Jean Batten Peak is a 1,971-metre-elevation (6,467-foot) mountain summit in Otago, New Zealand.

== Description ==
Jean Batten Peak is part of the Ailsa Mountains and is situated 16 kilometres (9.9 mi) west of Glenorchy in the Otago Region of the South Island. Precipitation runoff from the mountain's north slope drains into the headwaters of the Caples River, whereas all other slopes drain to the Greenstone River. Topographic relief is significant as the summit rises 1,350 metres (4,429 feet) above Lake McKellar in two kilometres.

== Eponymy ==
Jean Batten (1909–1982) was a famous New Zealand aviator who made a number of record-breaking solo flights – including the first solo flight from England to New Zealand in 1936. After paying a visit to the Walter Peak station, Major Peter Mackenzie gained approval to name the peak after her. This mountain's toponym has been officially approved by the New Zealand Geographic Board.

== Climate ==
Based on the Köppen climate classification, Jean Batten Peak is located in a marine west coast climate zone. Prevailing westerly winds blow moist air from the Tasman Sea onto the mountains, where the air is forced upward by the mountains (orographic lift), causing moisture to drop in the form of rain or snow. The months of December through February offer the most favourable weather for viewing or climbing this peak.

== Gallery ==
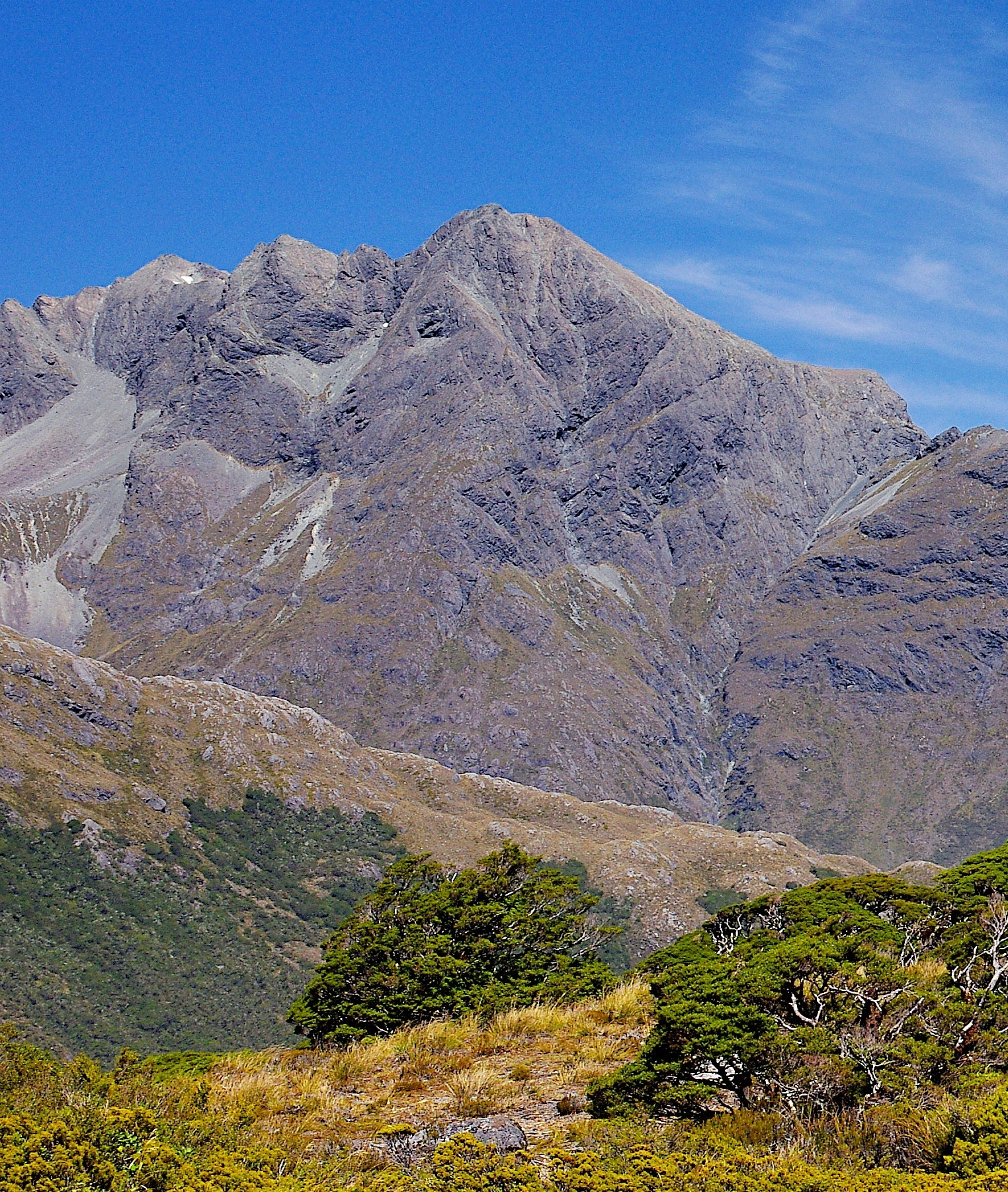
Jean Batten Peak from northwest

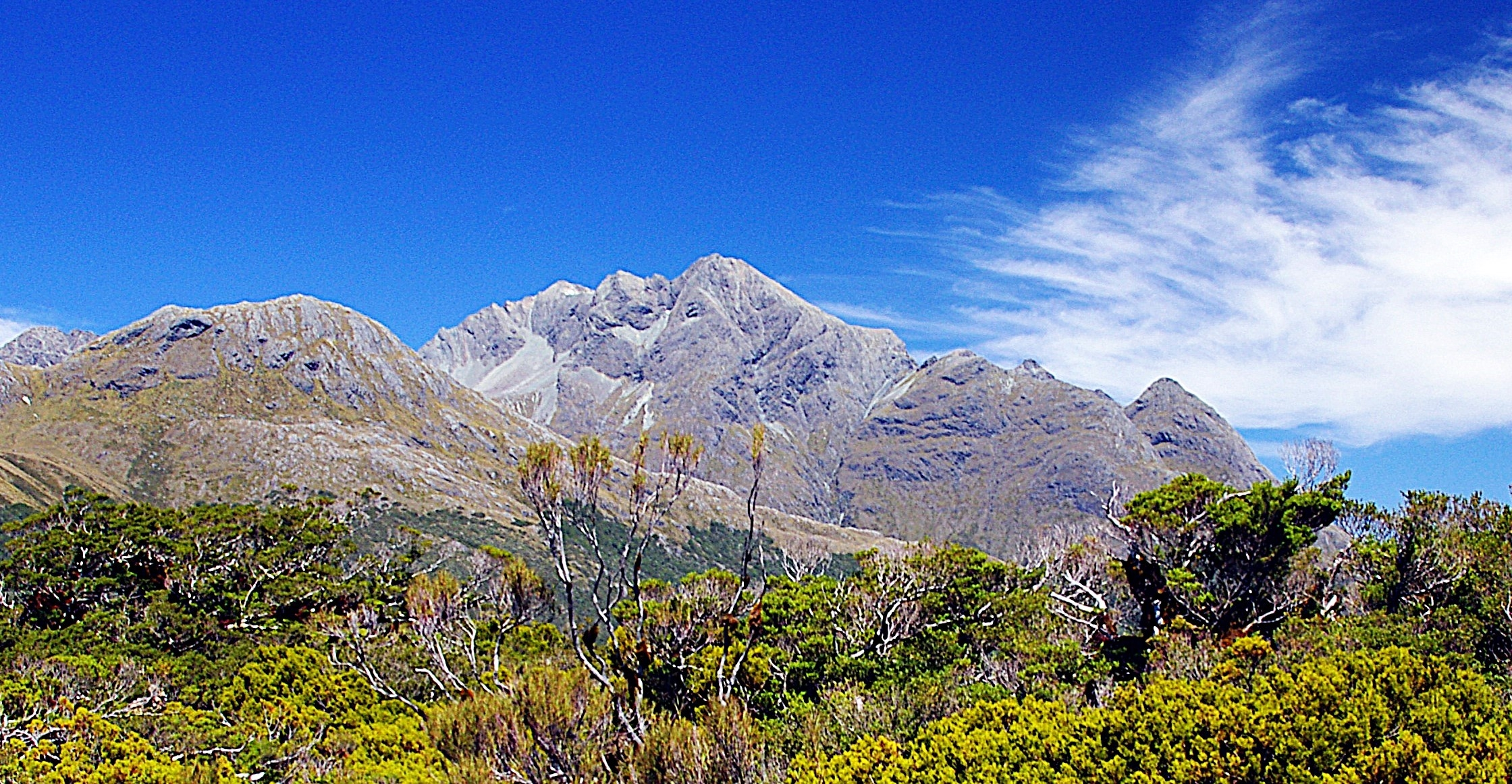
Jean Batten Peak from northwest

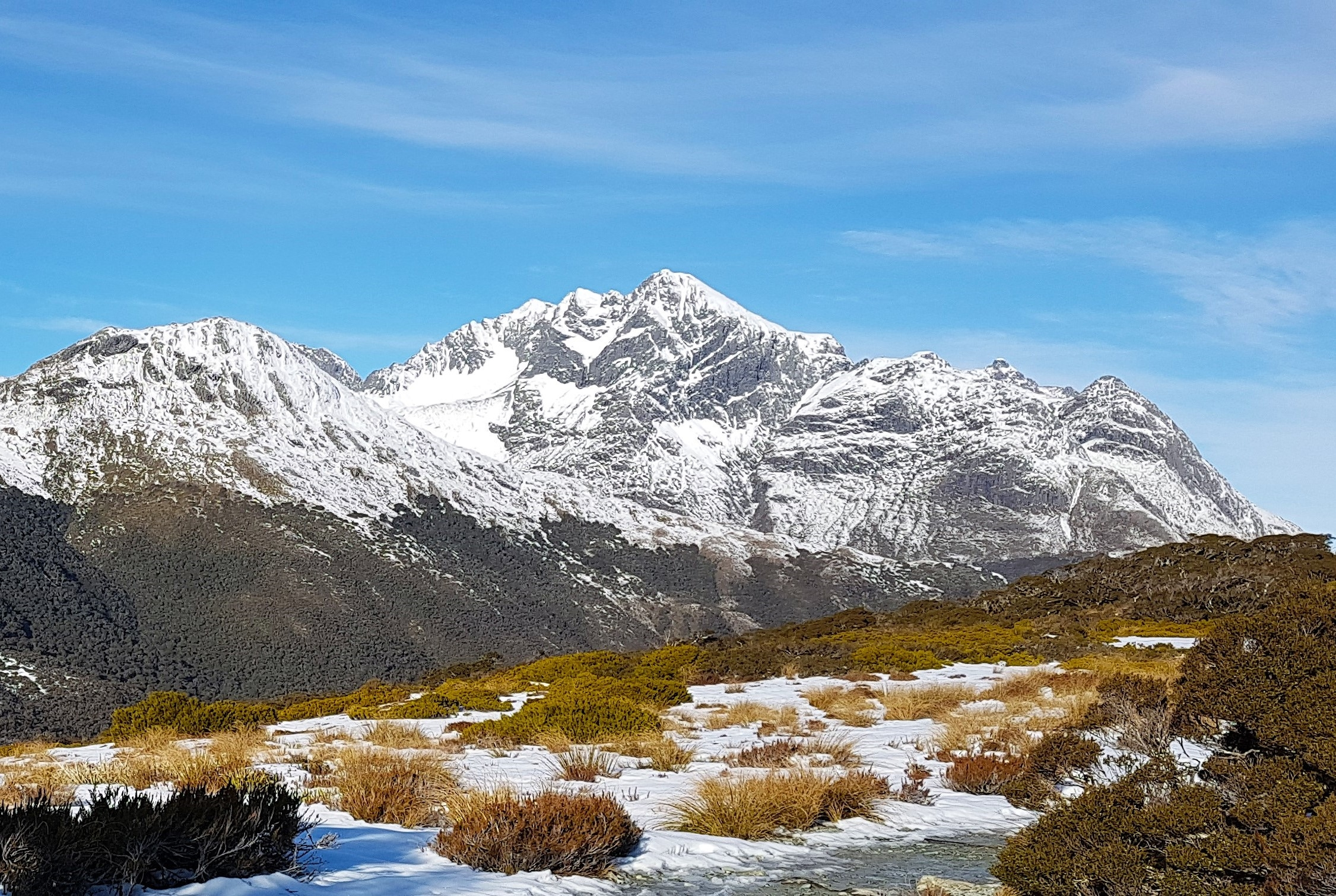
Northwest aspect in winter

== See also ==
- List of mountains of New Zealand by height
