= Somnus (disambiguation) =

Somnus is the personification of sleep in Roman mythology.

Somnus may also refer to:

- Somnus (horse), a British racehorse
- Somnus (mountain), a mountain in Otago, New Zealand
- Somnus (comics), a fictional mutant character in Marvel Comics
- 341520 Mors–Somnus, a minor planet in the Solar System
