= Mount Bonpland =

Mountain in Otago, New Zealand

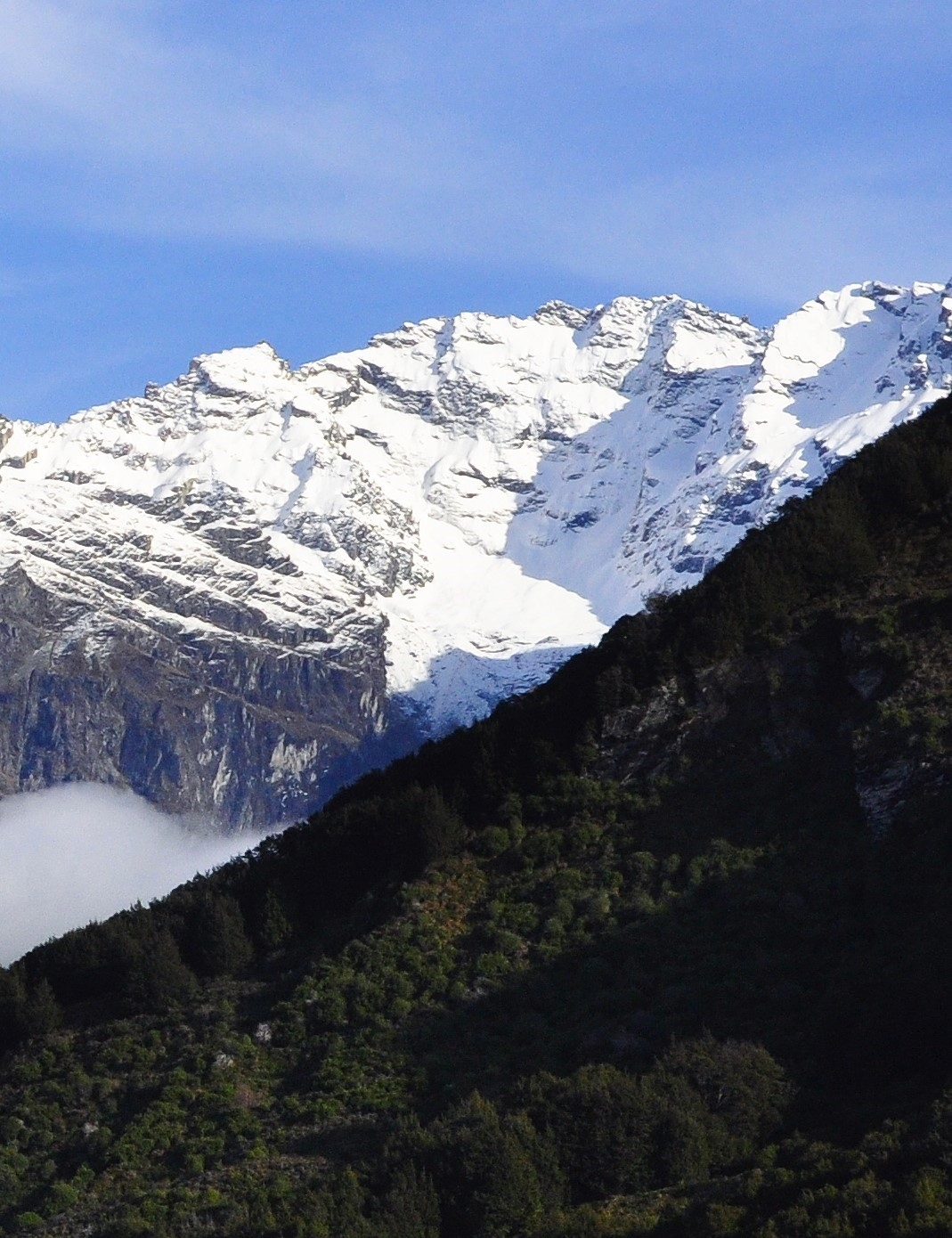
- Northeast aspect

Highest point
- Elevation: 2,343 m (7,687 ft)
- Prominence: 1,167 m (3,829 ft)
- Isolation: 18.42 km (11.45 mi)
- Coordinates: 44.826508°S 168.279138°E

Naming
- Etymology: Aimé Bonpland

Geography
- Location within New Zealand
- Interactive map of Mount Bonpland
- Location: South Island
- Country: New Zealand
- Region: Otago
- Parent range: Southern Alps; Humboldt Mountains
- Topo map(s): NZMS260 E41; Topo50 CB09

Climbing
- First ascent: 1894

Mount Bonpland is a 2,343-metre-elevation (7,687-foot) mountain in Otago, New Zealand.

== Description ==
Mount Bonpland is the highest peak in the Humboldt Mountains which are a subrange of the Southern Alps on the South Island. It is located nine kilometres west of the settlement of Glenorchy. Precipitation runoff from the mountain's slopes drains east into Glacier Burn which is a tributary of the Dart River / Te Awa Whakatipu, and west to Caples River, with both rivers emptying shortly thereafter into Lake Wakatipu. Topographic relief is significant as the summit rises 2,030 metres (6,660 feet) above the lake in six kilometres, and 540 metres (1,772 feet) above Bryant Glacier in 0.5 kilometre. The nearest higher peak is Mount Christina, 18.5 kilometres to the west. This mountain's toponym was applied by James McKerrow to honour Aimé Bonpland (1773–1858), a French explorer and botanist who traveled with Alexander von Humboldt in Latin America from 1799 to 1804. The first ascent of the summit was made in 1894 by W.J.P. Hodgkins and E. Bryant.

== Climate ==
Based on the Köppen climate classification, Mount Bonpland is located in a marine west coast climate zone. Prevailing westerly winds blow moist air from the Tasman Sea onto the mountain, where the air is forced upwards by the mountains (orographic lift), causing moisture to drop in the form of rain and snow. This climate supports the Bryant Glacier on the east slope of the peak. The months of December through February offer the most favourable weather for viewing or climbing this peak.

== Climbing ==
Climbing routes:

- East Face
- East Face Direct
- East Face – North Ridge
- West Ridge

== See also ==
- List of mountains of New Zealand by height

== Gallery ==
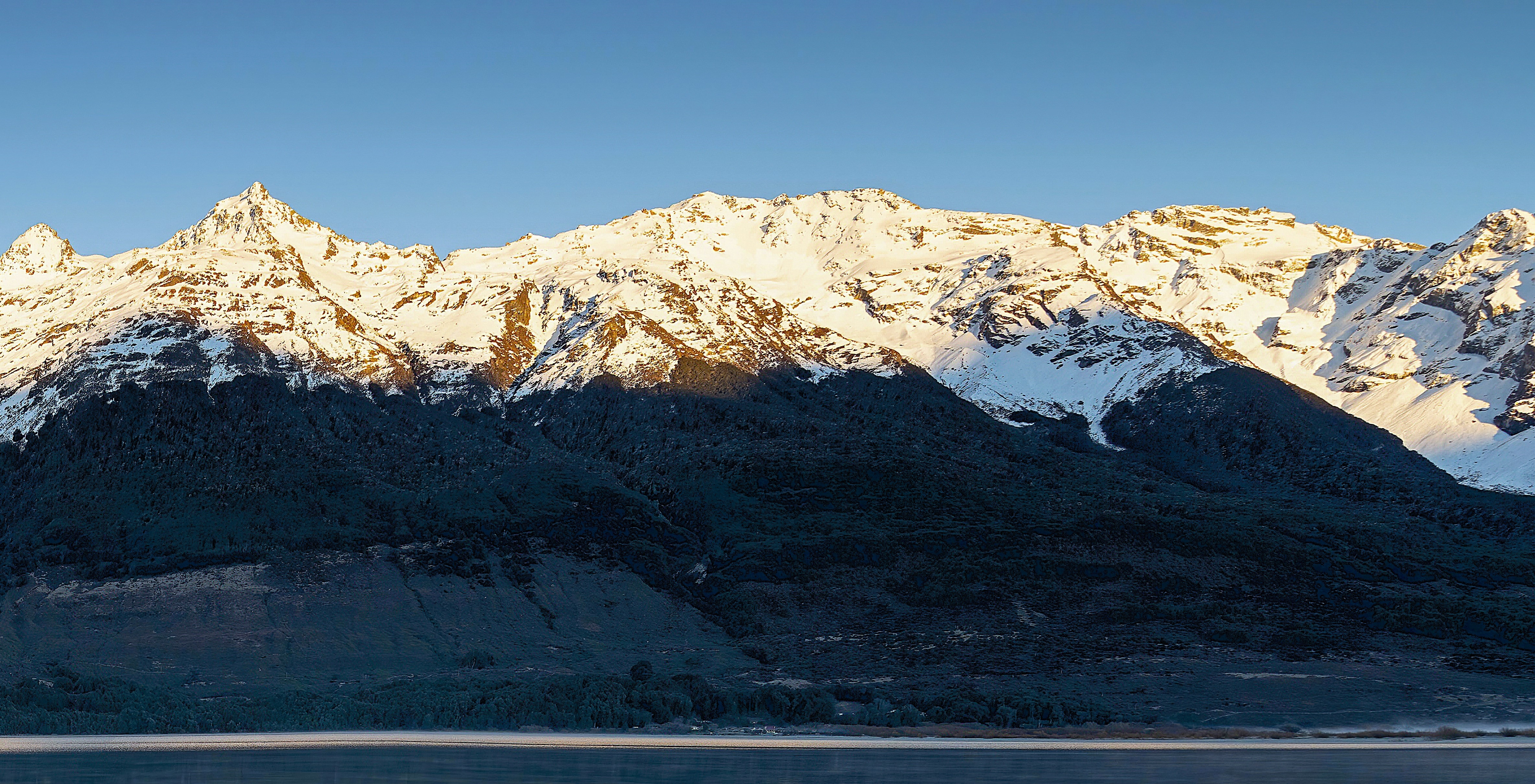
Bold Peak (left) and the Mount Bonpland complex, from east.

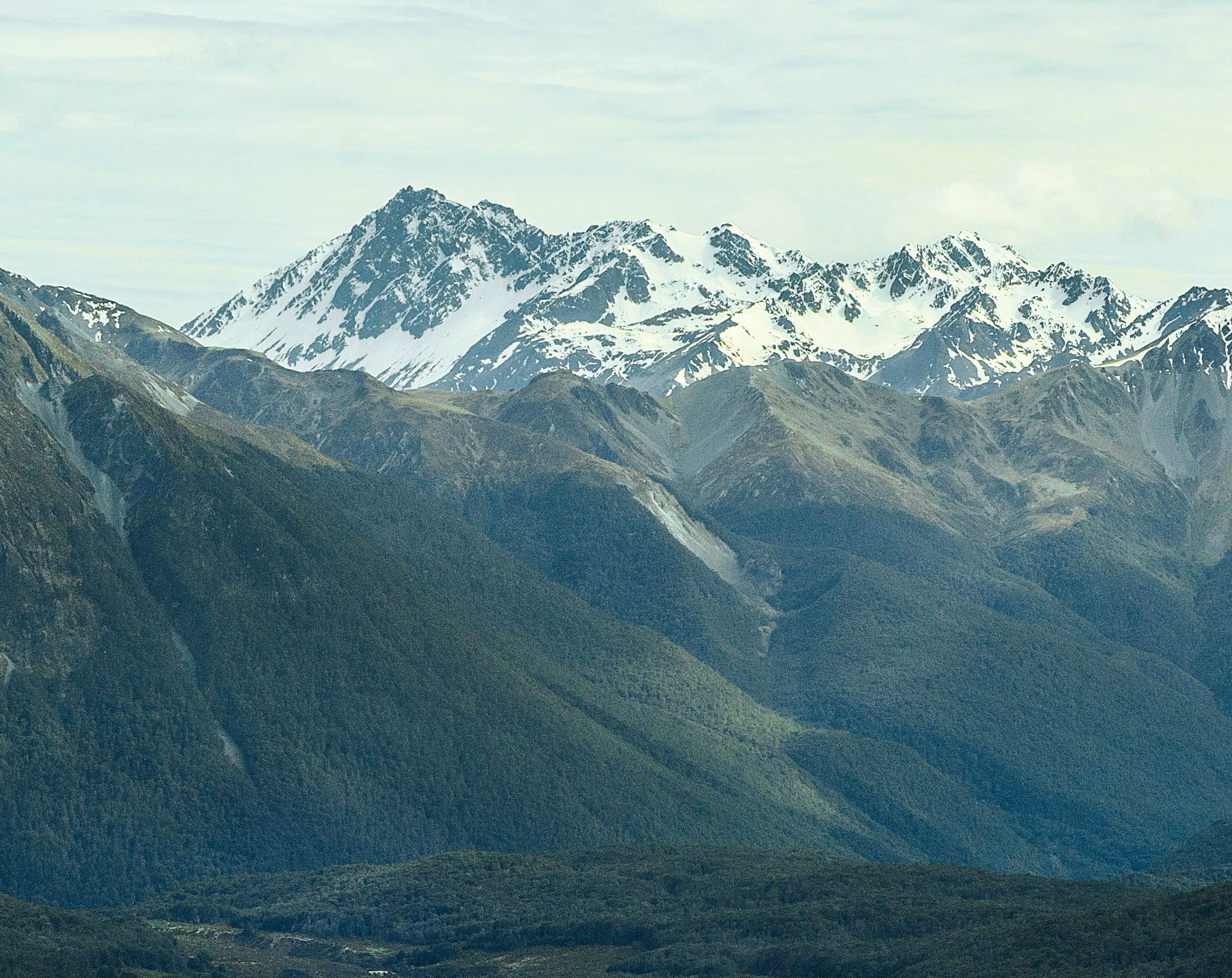
South aspect of Mount Bonpland (left), Bold Peak to right

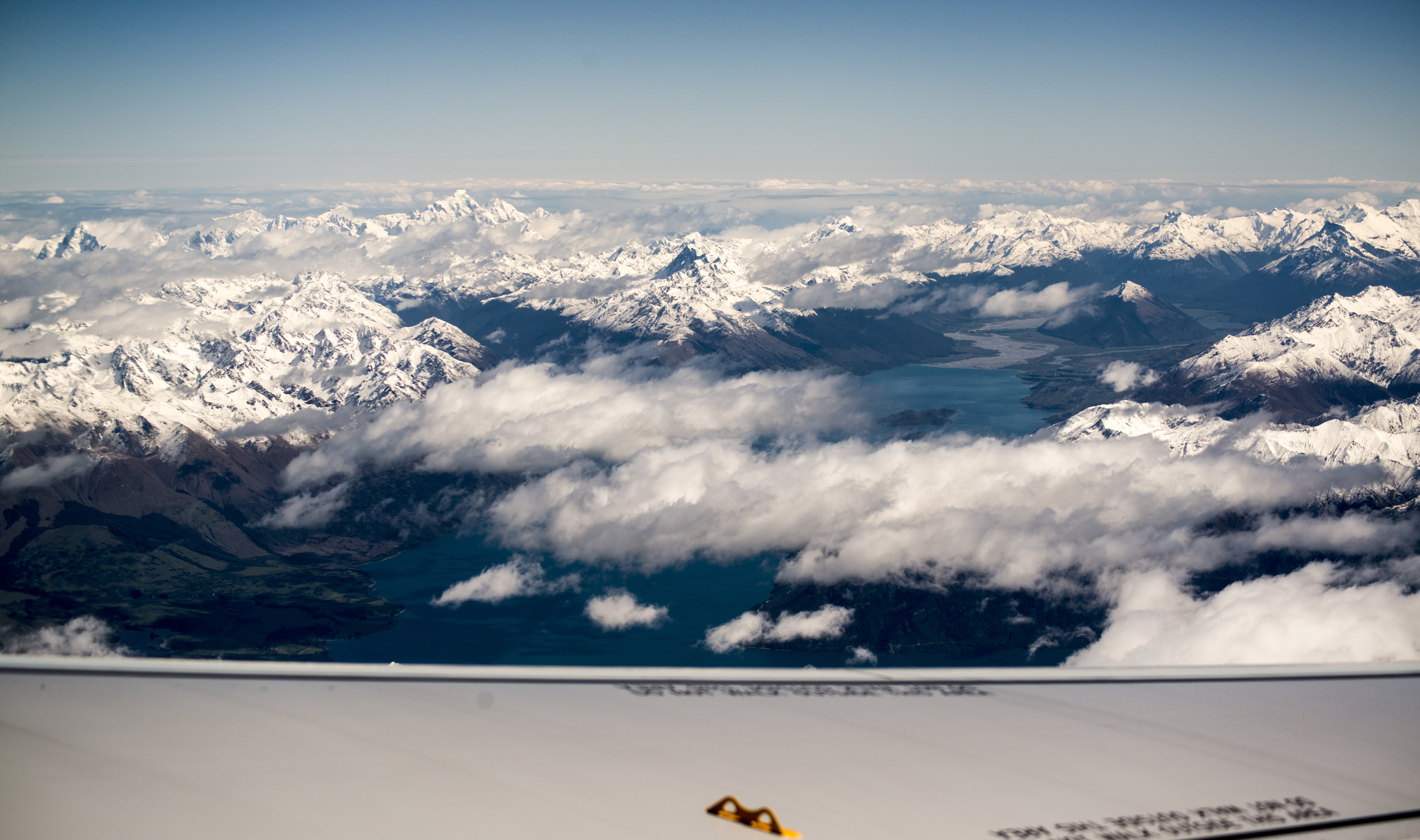
Mount Bonpland centred, view from plane

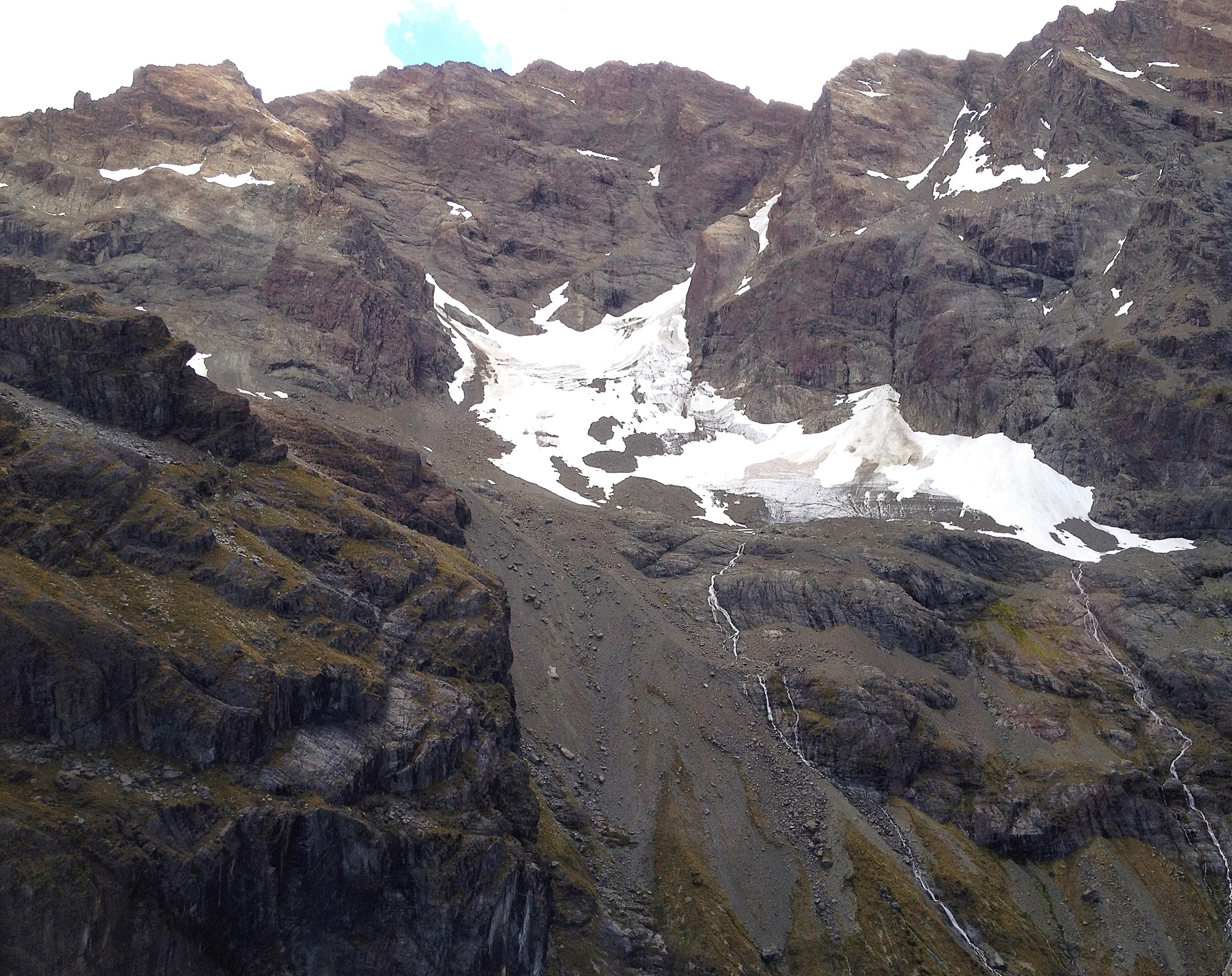
Aerial view of Mount Bonpland from east with what remains of Bryant Glacier

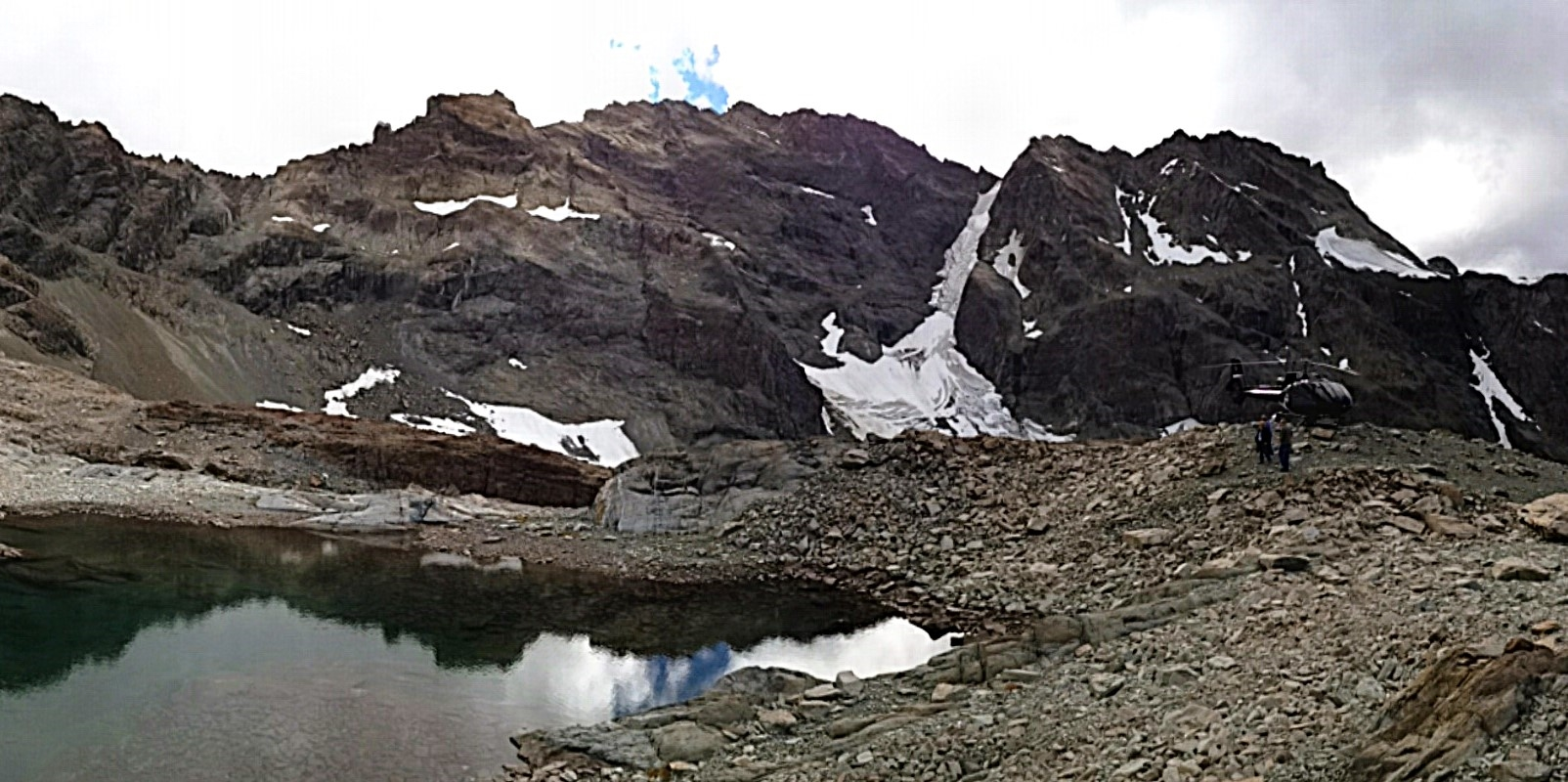
East aspect
