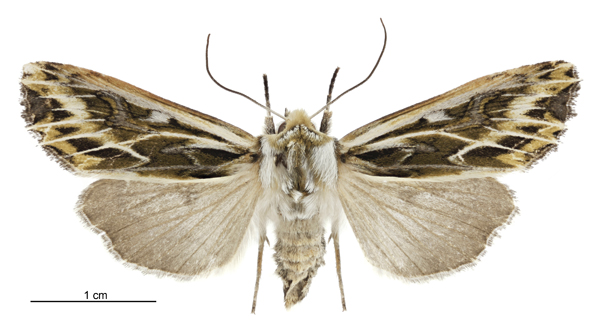
- Female
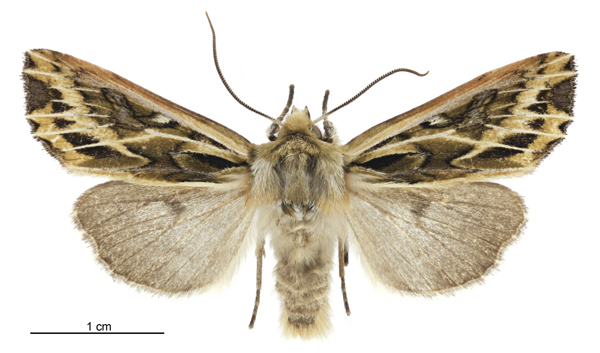
- Male

Scientific classification
- Kingdom: Animalia
- Phylum: Arthropoda
- Clade: Pancrustacea
- Class: Insecta
- Order: Lepidoptera
- Superfamily: Noctuoidea
- Family: Noctuidae
- Genus: Ichneutica
- Species: I. oliveri

Binomial name
- Ichneutica oliveri (Hampson, 1911)

Synonyms
- Morrisonia oliveri Hampson, 1911; Melanchra oliveri (Hampson, 1911); Graphania oliveri (Hampson, 1911)

= Ichneutica oliveri =

Species of moth

Ichneutica oliveri is a moth of the family Noctuidae. It is endemic to New Zealand, found only in the South Island. However it has not been observed on the eastern side of that island from mid-Canterbury southwards to Southland. This species is distinctive and is unlikely to be confused with other closely related species. It inhabits tussock grasslands, shrubland as well as granite sand plains, all in the alpine zone. Adults are on the wing from December to March and are attracted to light. They have been observed feeding on the flowers of Hebe species. The life history of this species is unknown as are the larval hosts.

== Taxonomy ==
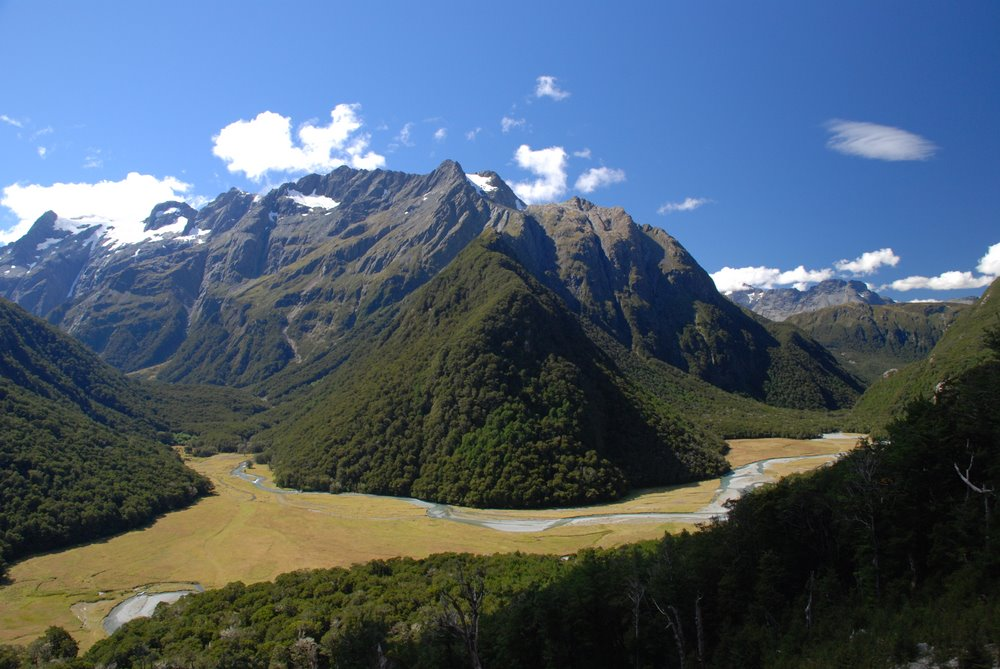
Humboldt Range

I. oliveri was first described by George Hampson in 1911 using a single female specimen collected at Bold Peak in the Humboldt Range by F. S. Oliver. The holotype specimen is held at the Natural History Museum, London. George Hudson described the species in his 1928 publication The butterflies and moths of New Zealand under the name Melanchra oliveri. In 1988, in his catalogue of New Zealand Lepidoptera, J. S. Dugdale placed this species within the genus Graphania. In 2019 Robert Hoare undertook a major review of New Zealand Noctuidae. During this review the genus Ichneutica was greatly expanded and the genus Graphania was subsumed into that genus as a synonym. As a result of this review, this species is now known as Ichneutica oliveri.

== Description ==
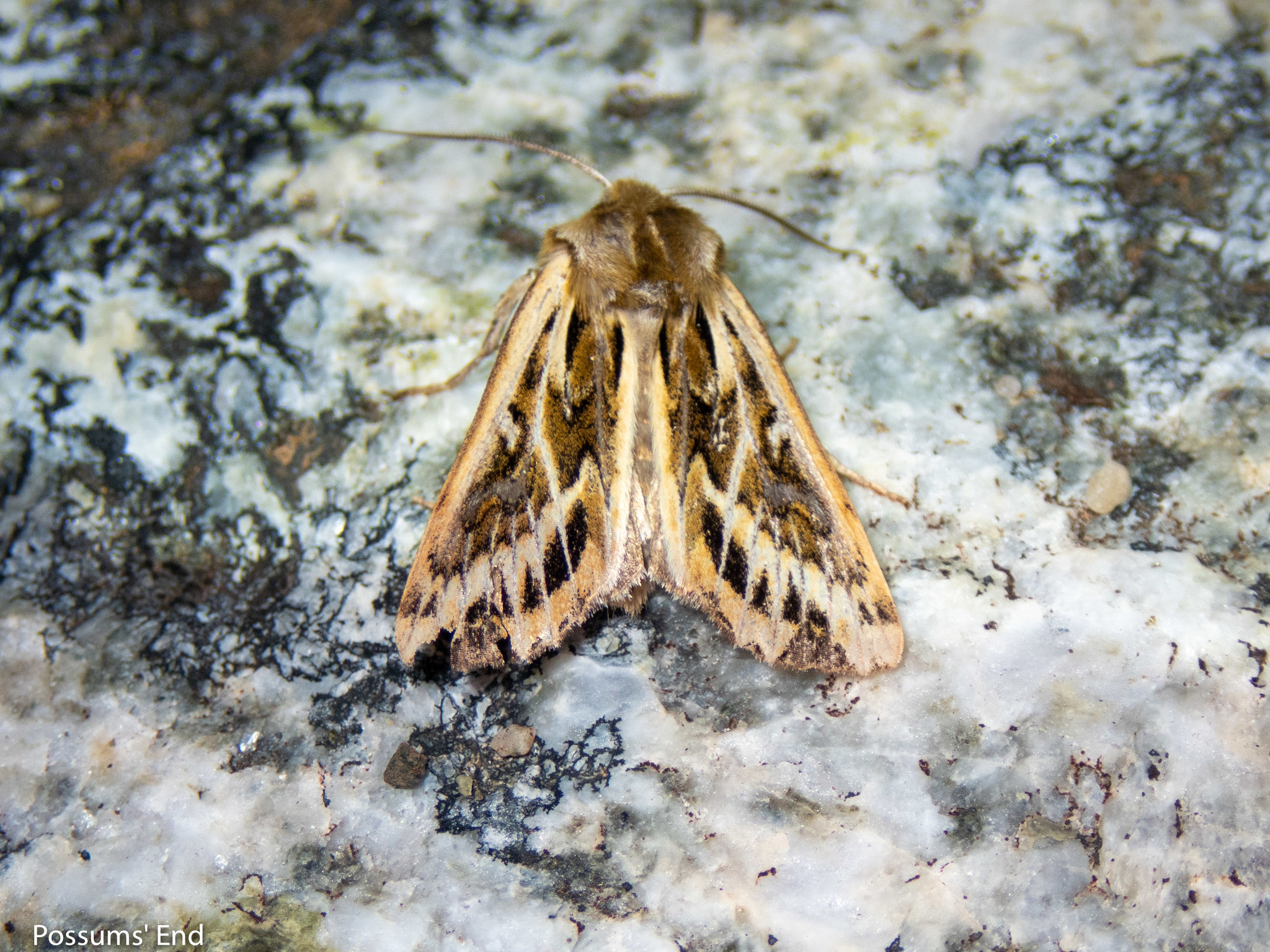
Ichneutica oliveri

Hampson described this species as follows:

♀ . Head and thorax grey-white, the vertex of head, tegulae, and dorsum of thorax tinged with brown, the outer edge of patagia brown; palpi brown; frons with lateral black bars; fore tibiae and tarsi suffused with brown; abdomen whitish tinged with grey-brown. Fore wing whitish faintly tinged with rufous, the area from subcostal nervure to above inner margin suffused with olive and blackish to postmedial line, the veins and submedian fold remaining whitish; a strong black streak below base of cell; anteraedial line black denned on inner side by white, oblique, waved, from subcostal nervure to above inner margin; orbicular defined by black and with some whitish in centre, oblique; reniform defined by black, narrow, angled inwards on median nervure to below orbicular; postmedial line black defined on outer side by white, slightly bent outwards below costa, then oblique, dentate, angled inwards in submedian fold to near antemedial line; subterminal line represented by the outer edge of the white area, defined on inner side by dentate black marks below costa and from vein 6 to submedian fold, angled outwards to termen at apex and veins 7, 4, 3, the area beyond it olive and blackish; a pale line at base of cilia. Hind wing grey suffused with fuscous brown; the underside white tinged with grey, a dark discoidal spot and diffused curved postmedial line.

I. oliveri is a distinctive moth, unlikely to be confused with other species. The male has a wingspan of between 38 and 40 mm and the female of between 42 and 46 mm.

== Distribution ==
This species is endemic to New Zealand. It is found only in the South Island, however this species has not been observed on the east side of that island from mid-Canterbury down to Southland.

== Habitat ==
This species prefers to inhabit tussock grasslands and shrubland in the alpine zone. This species also inhabits granite sand plains, a rare ecosystem in New Zealand, again in the alpine zone.

== Behaviour ==
Adults of this species are on the wing from December to March. This species is drawn to light.

== Life history and host species ==
The life history of this species is unknown as are the host species of the larvae. Adults have been observed feeding from flowers of Hebe species during the evening.
