= Poseidon Peak =

Mountain in New Zealand

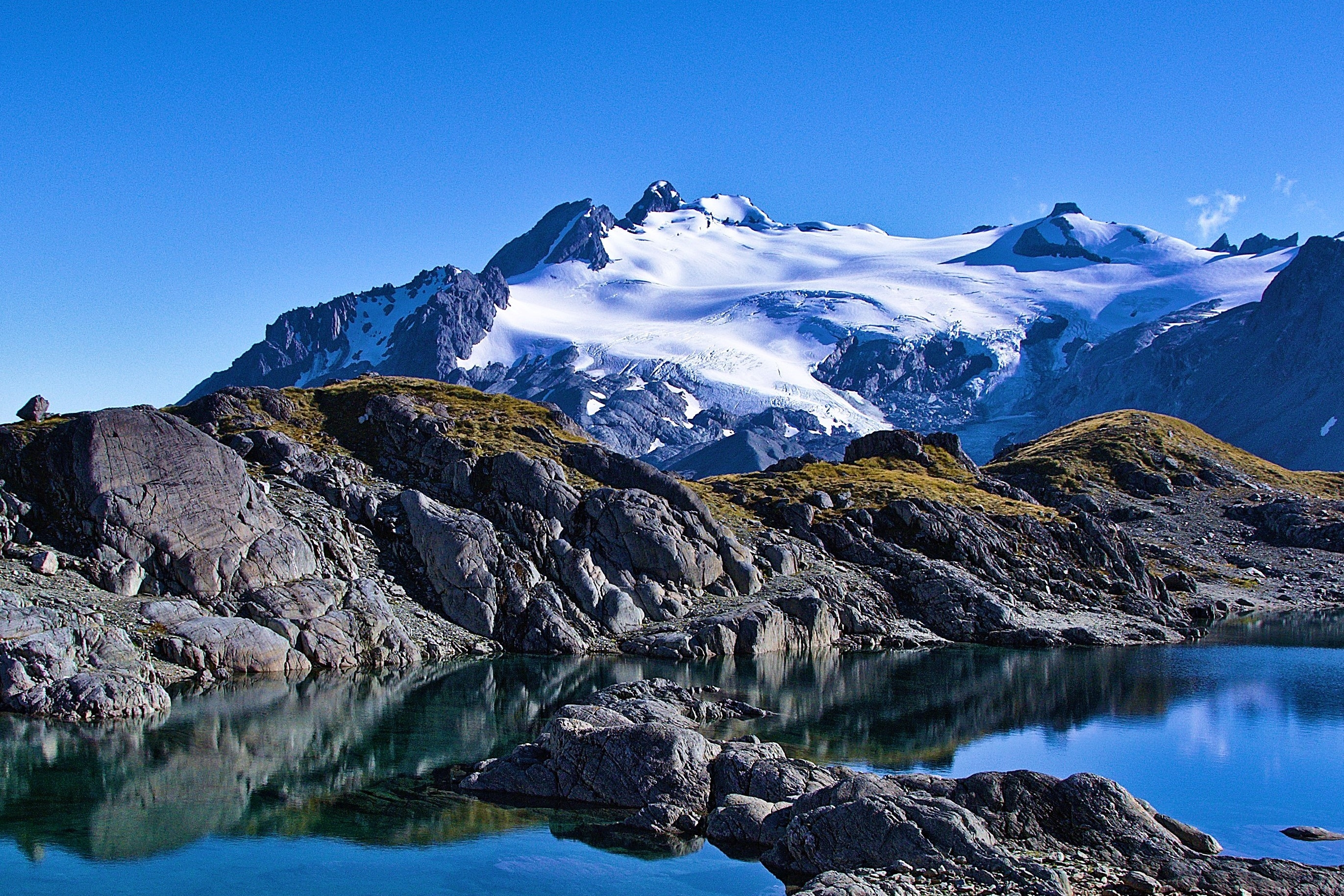
- South aspect

Highest point
- Elevation: 2,229 m (7,313 ft)
- Prominence: 723 m (2,372 ft)
- Isolation: 4.65 km (2.89 mi)
- Coordinates: 44°34′44″S 168°13′58″E

Naming
- Etymology: Poseidon

Geography
- Location within New Zealand
- Interactive map of Poseidon Peak
- Location: South Island
- Country: New Zealand
- Region: Southland / Otago
- Protected area: Fiordland National Park; Mount Aspiring National Park
- Parent range: Southern Alps; Humboldt Mountains
- Topo map(s): NZMS260 E40; Topo50 CA09

Poseidon Peak is a 2,229-metre-elevation (7,313-foot) mountain in Fiordland, New Zealand.

== Description ==
Poseidon Peak is part of the Humboldt Mountains which are a subrange of the Southern Alps. It is set on the boundary shared by the Otago and Southland Regions of South Island. It is also set on the boundary shared by Mount Aspiring National Park and Fiordland National Park which are part of the Te Wahipounamu UNESCO World Heritage Site. Precipitation runoff from the mountain's west slope drains to the Hollyford River via Hidden Falls Creek, whereas the other slopes drain into Rock Burn and Beans Burn which are tributaries of the Dart River / Te Awa Whakatipu. Topographic relief is significant as the summit rises 1,430 metres (4,692 feet) above Hidden Falls Creek in 2.5 kilometres. This mountain's toponym has been officially approved by the New Zealand Geographic Board. Poseidon Peak is centred within a group of peaks which share a common Greek mythology naming theme: Tantalus Peak, Niobe Peak, Poseidon, Sarpedon, Amphion Peak, Minos Peak, and Mount Chaos.

== Climate ==
Based on the Köppen climate classification, Poseidon Peak is located in a marine west coast climate zone. Prevailing westerly winds blow moist air from the Tasman Sea onto the mountain, where the air is forced upwards by the mountains (orographic lift), causing moisture to drop in the form of rain and snow. This climate supports the Park Pass Glacier on the south slope. The months of December through February offer the most favourable weather for viewing or climbing this peak.

== Gallery ==
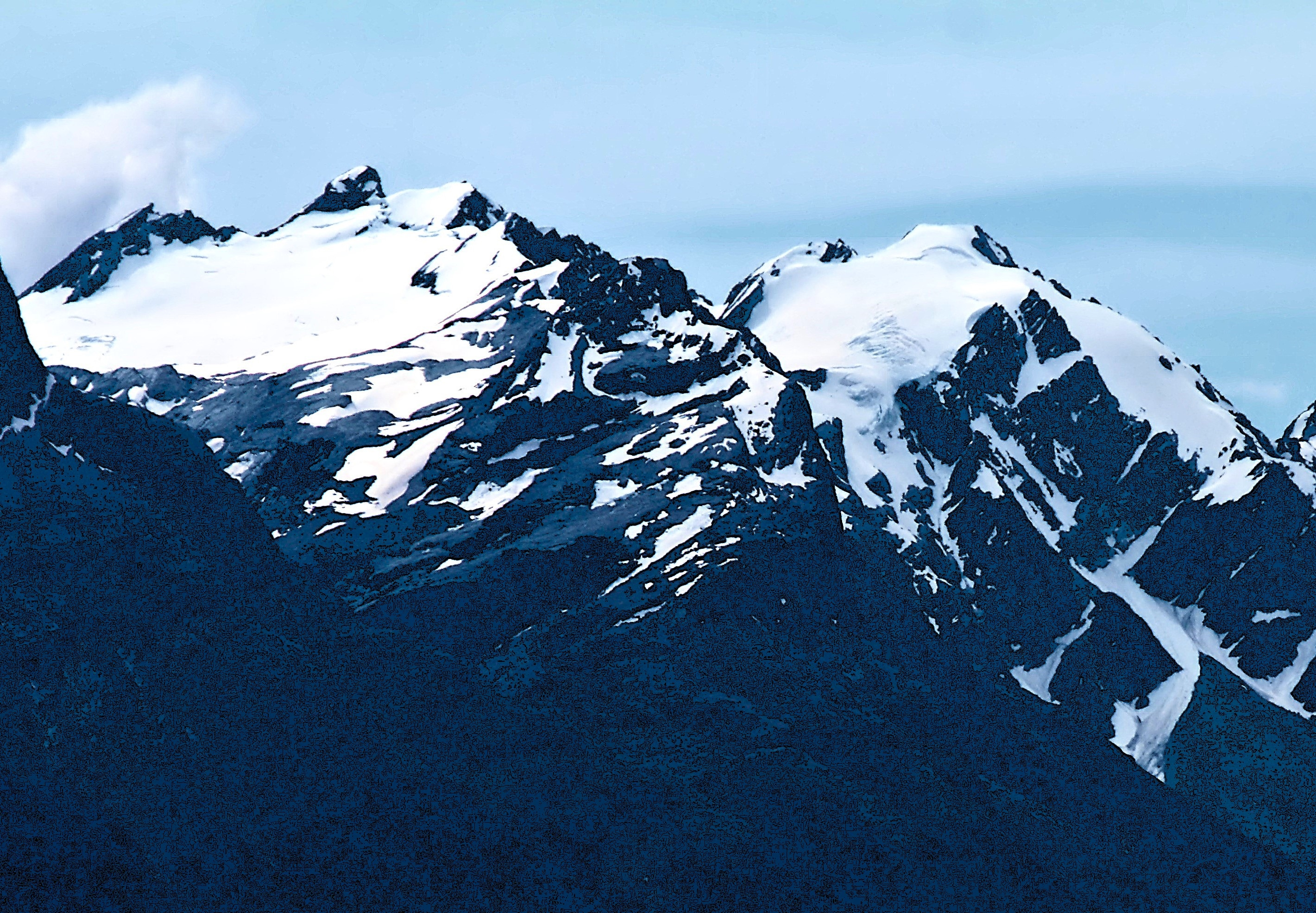
Poseidon Peak (left) and Niobe Peak (right) from southeast

== See also ==
- List of mountains of New Zealand by height
