= Mount Chaos =

Mountain in New Zealand

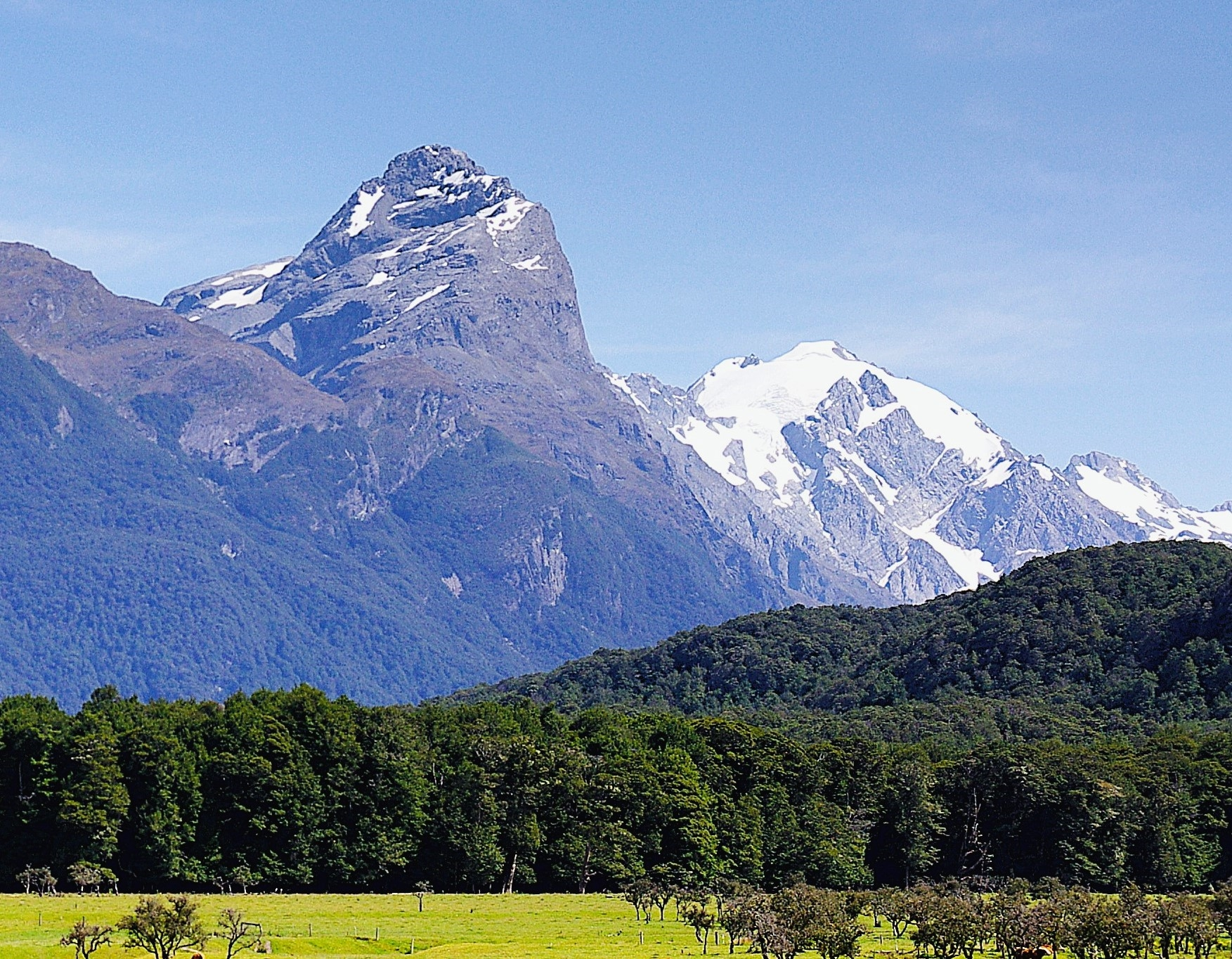
- Southeast aspect, left (Niobe Peak to right)

Highest point
- Elevation: 1,995 m (6,545 ft)
- Prominence: 195 m (640 ft)
- Isolation: 1.6 km (0.99 mi)
- Coordinates: 44.61168041°S 168.2662428°E

Naming
- Etymology: Chaos

Geography
- Location within New Zealand
- Interactive map of Mount Chaos
- Location: South Island
- Country: New Zealand
- Region: Otago
- Protected area: Mount Aspiring National Park
- Parent range: Southern Alps; Humboldt Mountains
- Topo map(s): NZMS260 E40; Topo50 CA09

Climbing
- First ascent: 1947 by Jack Holloway
- Easiest route: South Ridge

Mount Chaos is a 1,995-metre-elevation (6,545-foot) mountain in Otago, New Zealand.

== Description ==
Mount Chaos is part of the Humboldt Mountains which are a subrange of the Southern Alps. It is set in Mount Aspiring National Park which is part of the Te Wahipounamu UNESCO World Heritage Site on the South Island. Precipitation runoff from the mountain's slopes drains to the Dart River / Te Awa Whakatipu via Beans Burn. Topographic relief is significant as the summit rises 1,400 metres (4,593 feet) above Beans Burn in one kilometre. Mount Chaos is part of a group of peaks which share a common Greek mythology naming theme: Tantalus Peak, Niobe Peak, Poseidon Peak, Sarpedon, Amphion Peak, and Minos Peak.

== Climate ==
Based on the Köppen climate classification, Mount Chaos is located in a marine west coast climate zone. Prevailing westerly winds blow moist air from the Tasman Sea onto the mountain, where the air is forced upwards by the mountains (orographic lift), causing moisture to drop in the form of rain and snow. The months of December through February offer the most favourable weather for viewing or climbing this peak.

== Gallery ==
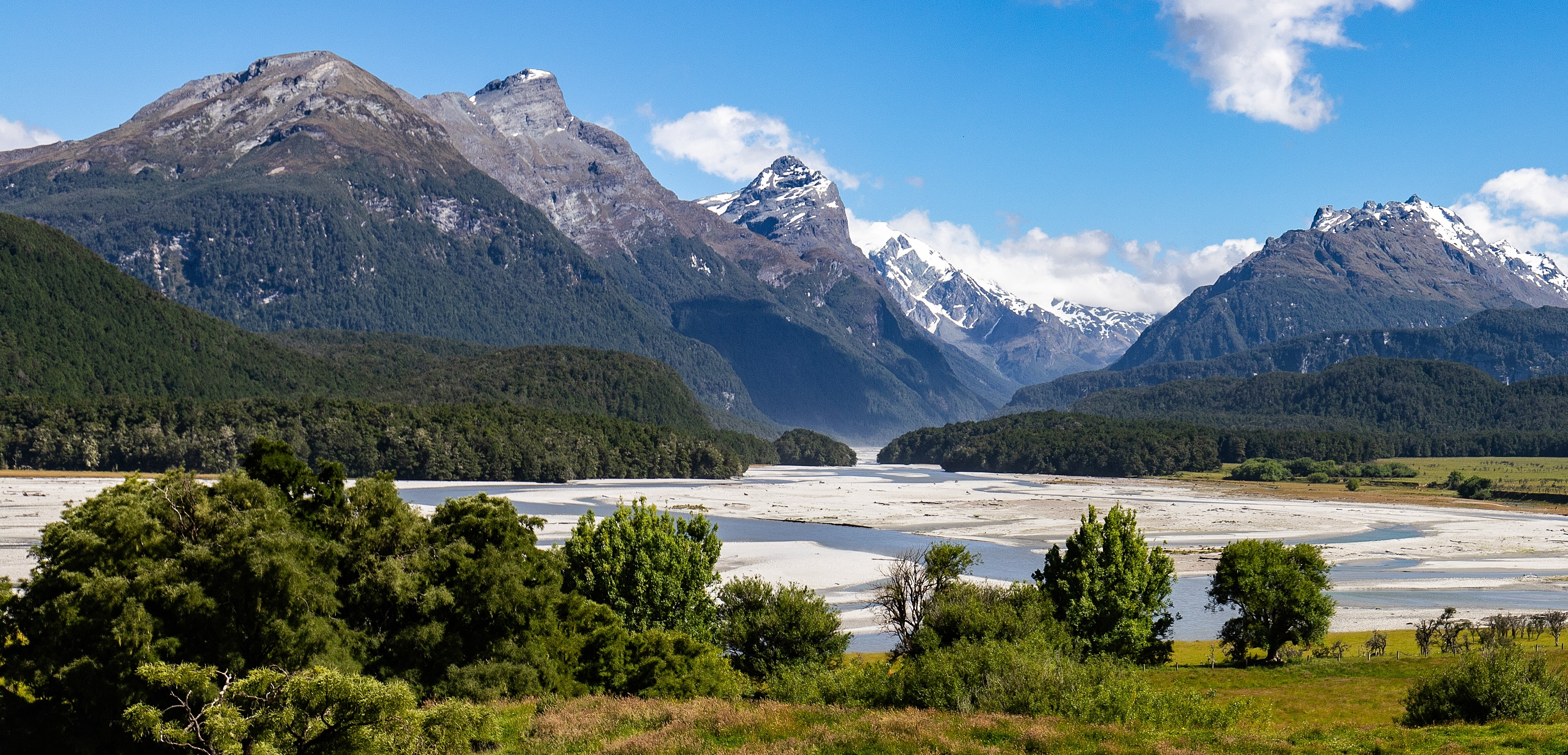
Mount Chaos centred, Mount Nox (left), Dart River

== See also ==
- List of mountains of New Zealand by height
