= Greenstone and Caples Tracks =

Hiking trails in South Island, New Zealand

Coordinates: 44°56′04″S 168°20′42″E

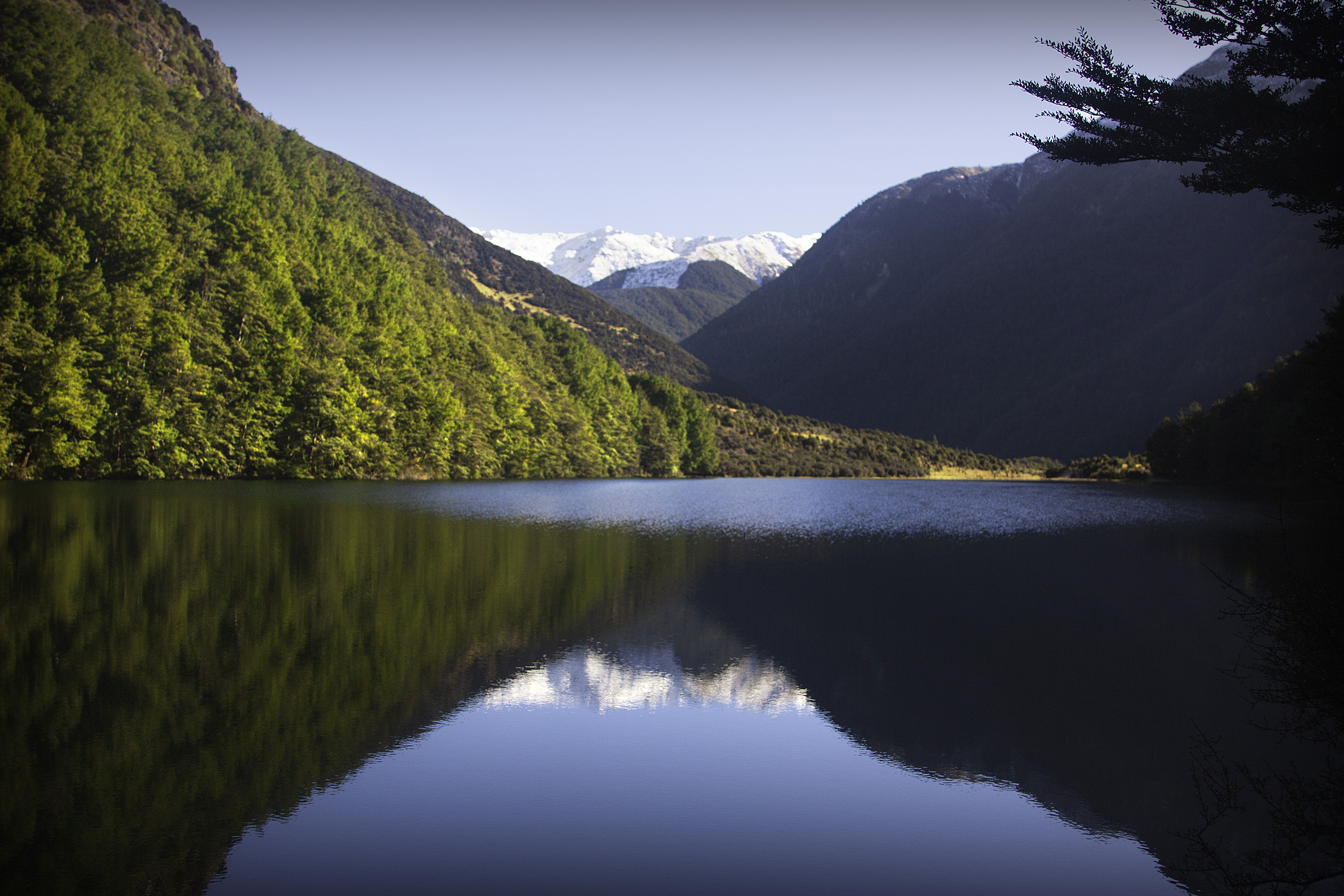
- Lake Rere on the Greenstone Track
- Length: 61 km (38 mi)
- Location: Fiordland National Park, New Zealand
- Trailheads: Greenstone carpark, The Divide
- Use: Tramping, trail running
- Highest point: 945 m (3,100 ft), McKellar Saddle
- Lowest point: Greenstone carpark, 477 m (1,565 ft)
- Difficulty: medium
- Season: Spring to Autumn (open all year)
- Months: late October to mid April
- Sights: Alpine views, lakes, forests, tussocklands, rivers
- Hazards: Hypothermia, high winds, rocks, roots, snow, rain, avalanche
- Surface: dirt, rock, roots
- Website: doc.govt.nz/parks-and-recreation/places-to-go/otago/places/greenstone-and-caples-conservation-areas/things-to-do/greenstone-and-caples-tracks

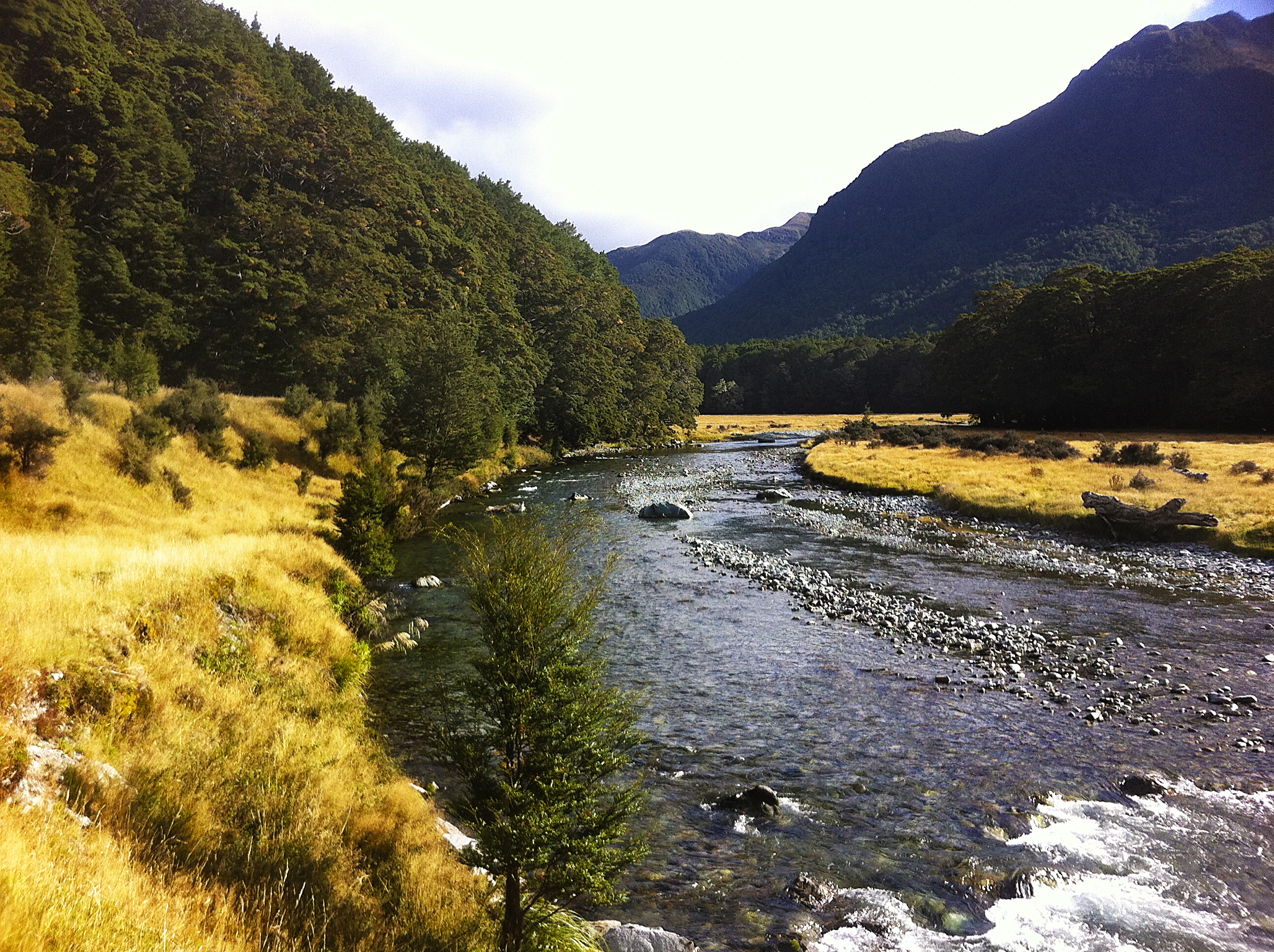
Caples river as viewed from the track

The Greenstone and Caples Tracks form a 61 kilometres (38 mi)tramping (hiking) circuit which is located in the South Island of New Zealand.

== Geography ==
Each of the Greenstown and Caples tracks can be completed by themselves, and they are linked by the McKellar Saddle, allowing trampers to walk a full loop. The loop also links to several other tracks including the (New Zealand Great Walk) Routeburn Track, as well as the Mavora Lakes Conservation Park tracks. All of these areas are part of the Te Wāhipounamu/South-West New Zealand World Heritage Area.

== Ownership and access ==
The Caples Track follows the Caples River up the privately owned Caples Valley while the Greenstone Track follows the Greenstone River in the Greenstone Valley which is also privately owned.

Much of the area is owned by the local tribe of the Ngāi Tahu while most of the tracks are in the Greenstone and Caples Conservation Areas with some also being a part of the Fiordland National Park around Lake McKellar. The whole track is open to public access as long as stock is not disturbed.

The tracks can be accessed from the Greenstone Road carpark, located roughly 11km along the gravel road from Kinloch, near Glenorchy. Because of fords, the road is not suitable for camper vans. The carpark is roughly 86km from Queenstown. The tracks can also be accessed via the Routeburn Track, starting from the divide end of the track.

== Huts ==
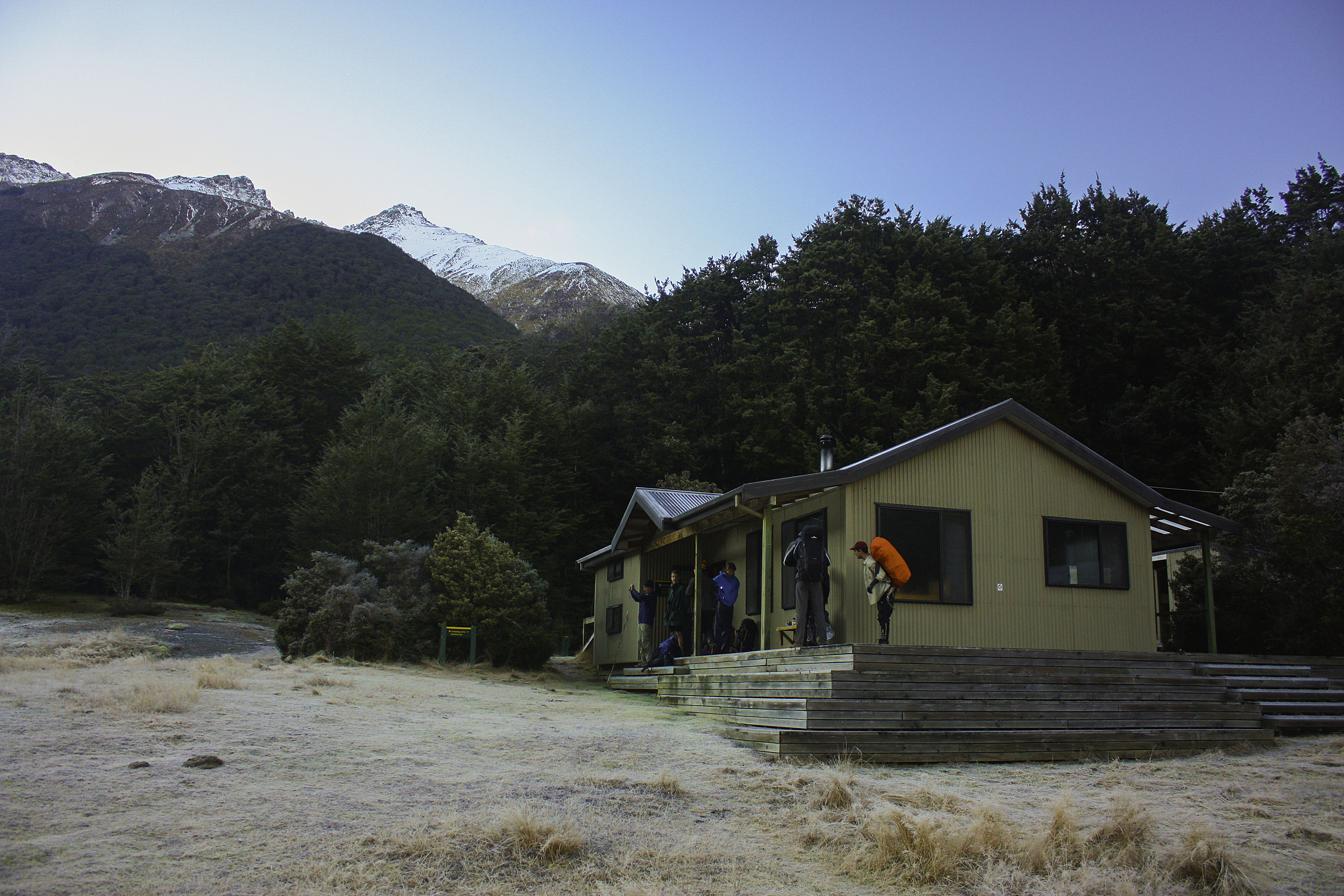
Greenstone Hut

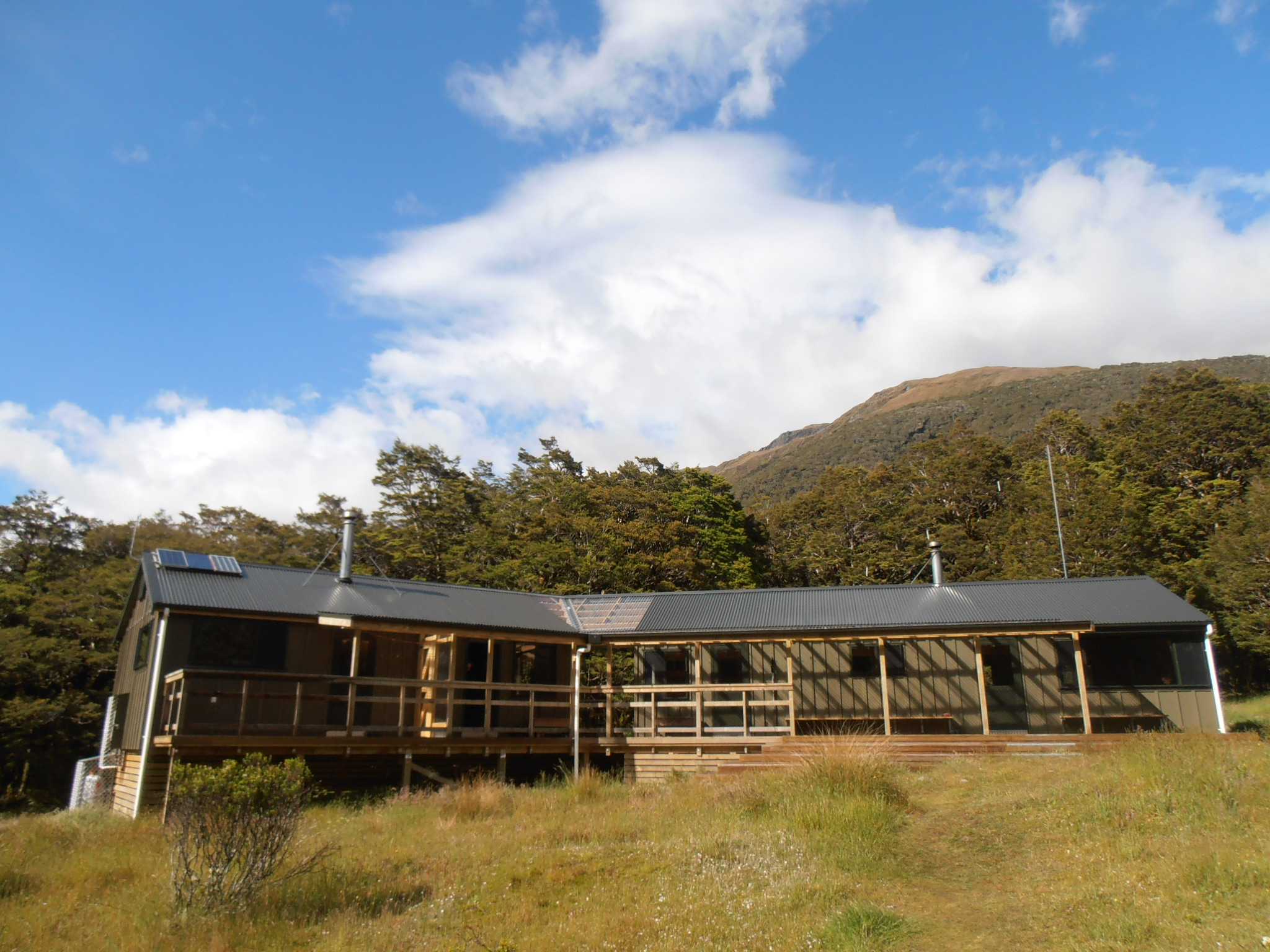
McKellar Hut

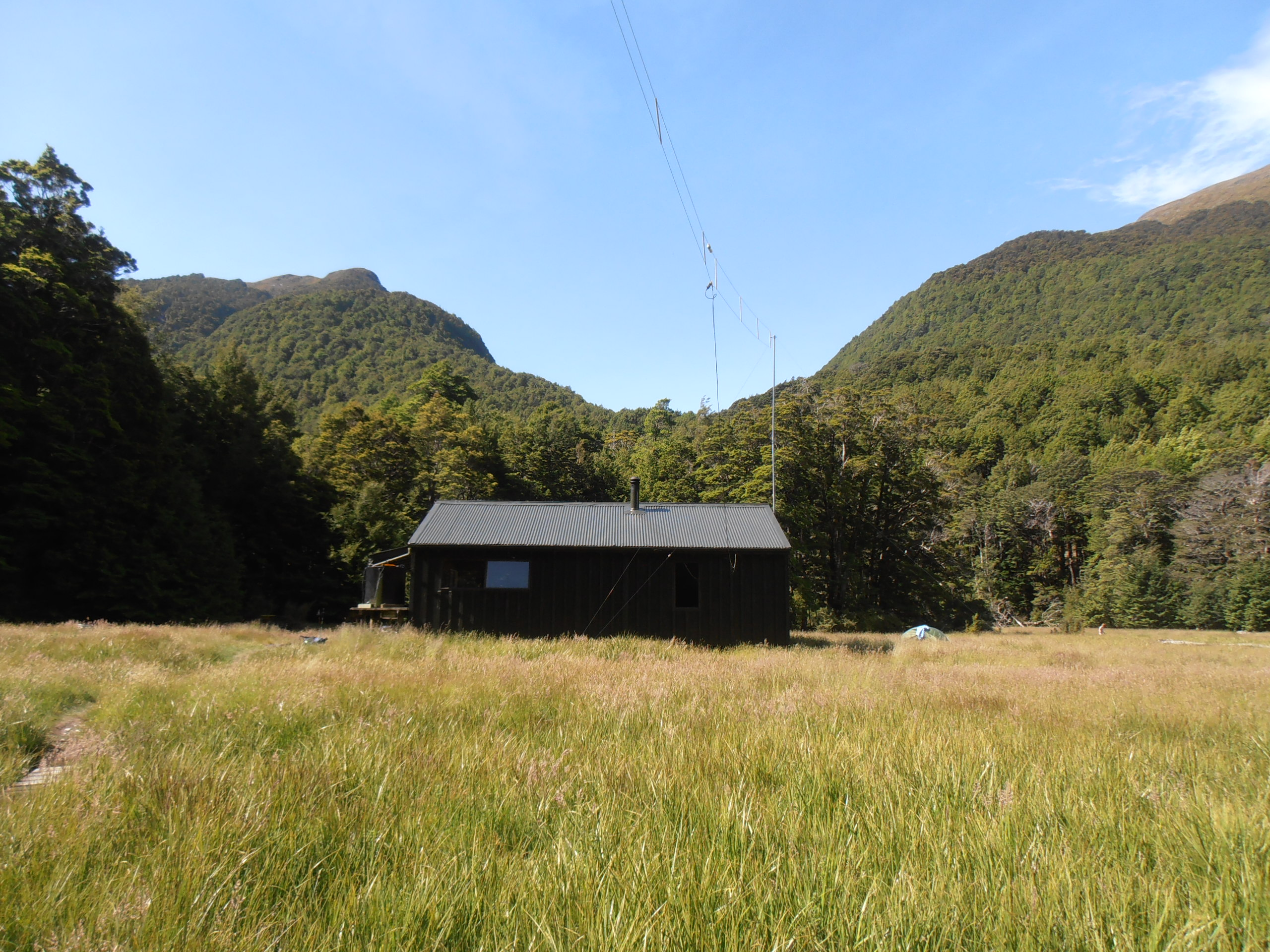
Upper Caples Hut (private)

There are three public huts on the tracks, the Greenstone Hut, the McKellar Hut and the Mid Caples Hut. There are also several private huts as well as some hunters huts: The Mid Greenstone Hut and the Upper Caples Hut.

Access to the Mavora Lakes Conservation Park is from the Greenstone Hut. Access to the Routeburn Track is near McKellar Hut.

== History ==
The Caples track is named after Patrick Q. Caples, one of the early gold miners in the area during the Otago gold rush of the 1860s. He first crossed the mountains in the area of the Caples valley in January 1863, while trying to find a route from the Queenstown goldfields to the West Coast. During the same expedition, he also named the Hollyford Valley. After having to cut his first expedition short due to lack of supplies, he tried again, this time crossing the headwaters of the Greenstone River, and following the Hollyford Valley as far as Martins Bay, mapping the areas he passed through.

== Conservation efforts ==
In 2023, the Department of Conservation (DOC) and Ngāi Tahu released 18 takahē in the Greenstone Valley.
