= Greenstone River =

Coordinates: 44°56′35″S 168°18′54″E

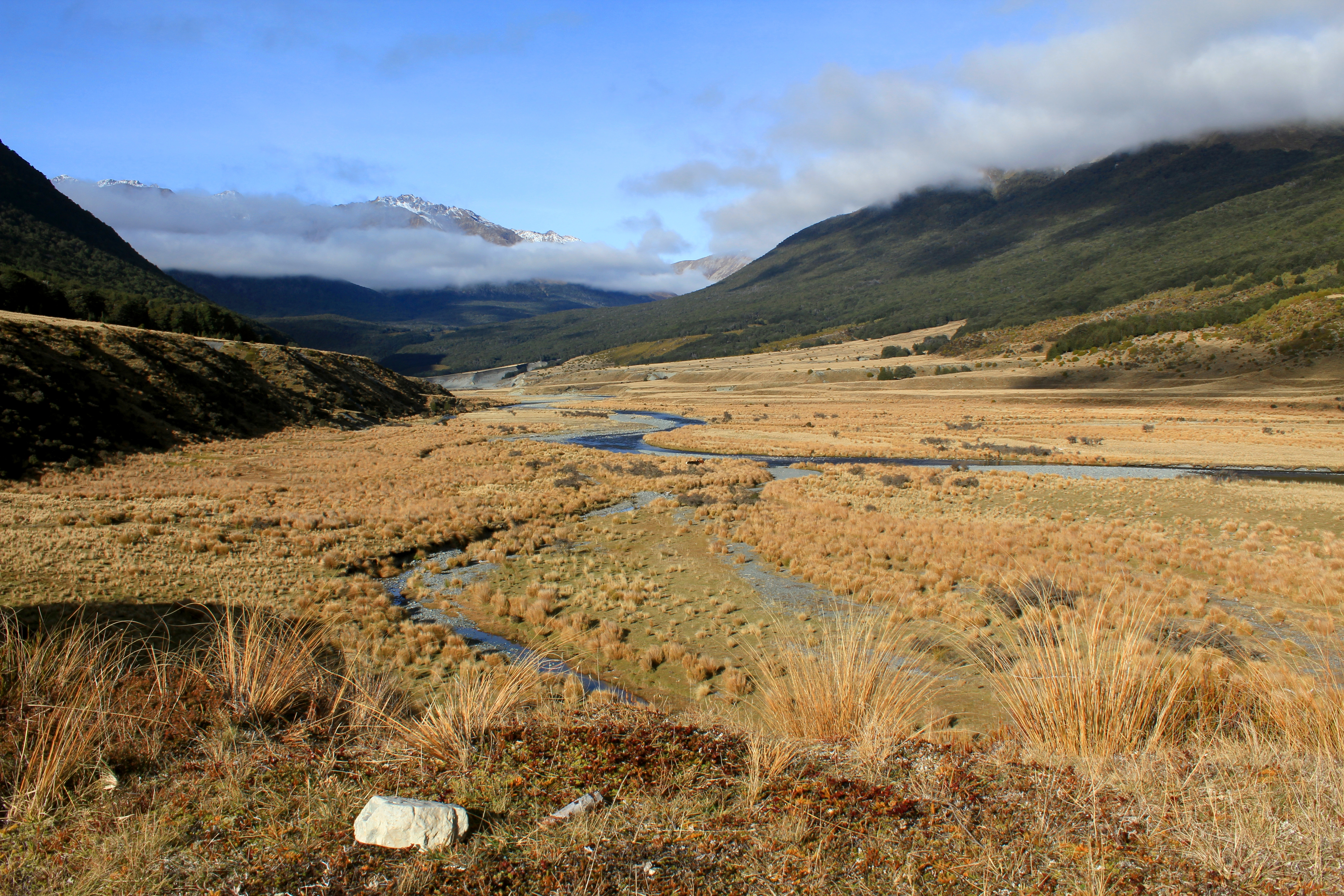

Location
- Country: New Zealand

Physical characteristics
- Source
  - location: Ailsa Mountains
- Mouth
  - location: Lake Wakatipu

The Greenstone River is a river in the Otago Region of New Zealand. It arises as the McKellar Branch in the Ailsa Mountains and as the Pass Burn in the Thomson Mountains, and joins the Caples River to flow into upper Lake Wakatipu. It is probably named because greenstone was found in the area. The Greenstone Track follows the river north along the McKellar Branch to Lake McKellar, joining the Hollyford Track. Another track follows the Pass Burn and reaches North Mavora Lake.

== See also ==
- List of rivers of New Zealand
- Greenstone and Caples Tracks
