= Humboldt Mountains (New Zealand) =

Range of mountains in the Southern Alps of New Zealand

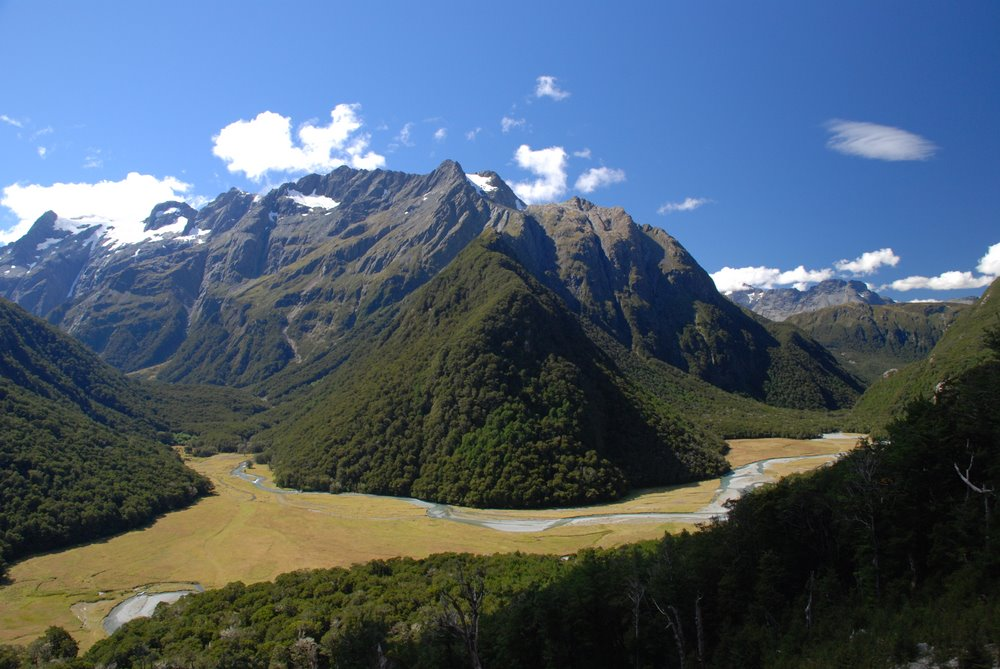
- The Humboldt Mountains, with the Routeburn River in the foreground

Highest point
- Peak: Mount Bonpland
- Elevation: 2,348 m (7,703 ft)
- Coordinates: 44°49′37″S 168°16′44″E

Dimensions
- Length: 30 km (19 mi)

Naming
- Etymology: Named by James McKerrow in honour of Alexander von Humboldt

Geography
- Location within New Zealand
- Location: Southwestern South Island
- Country: New Zealand
- Range coordinates: 44°48′S 168°17′E

Geology
- Orogeny: Tectonic uplift

The Humboldt Mountains or Humboldt Range are one of the many ranges which make up the Southern Alps / Kā Tiritiri o te Moana in the South Island of New Zealand. They lie to the northwest of Lake Wakatipu in the Otago Region. Parts of the range lie within Fiordland National Park, and they form the southern extremity of Mount Aspiring National Park. The range was named by early explorer James McKerrow, and like many geographic features worldwide, it was named in honour of notable scientist Alexander von Humboldt.

The Humboldts run roughly north-south for a distance of some 30 kilometres (19 mi), its eastern and western edges defined by the roughly parallel glaciated valleys of the Hollyford and Dart / Te Awa Whakatipu rivers. They are separated from the Ailsa Range to the south by the smaller valley of the Caples River. In the extreme southeast, the range drops straight to the waters of Lake Wakatipu, close to the small settlements of Kinloch and Glenorchy. Numerous small rivers have their sources within the Humboldts, notably the Routeburn River and the Olivine River. Two major tramping tracks follow valleys within the Humboldt Range, the Caples Track and the Routeburn Track.

Several peaks within the Humboldt Mountains rise to over 2,000 metres (6,600 ft) above sea level, the highest peak being Mount Bonpland, at 2,348 metres (7,703 ft).
