= Caples River =

Coordinates: 44°56′S 168°20′E

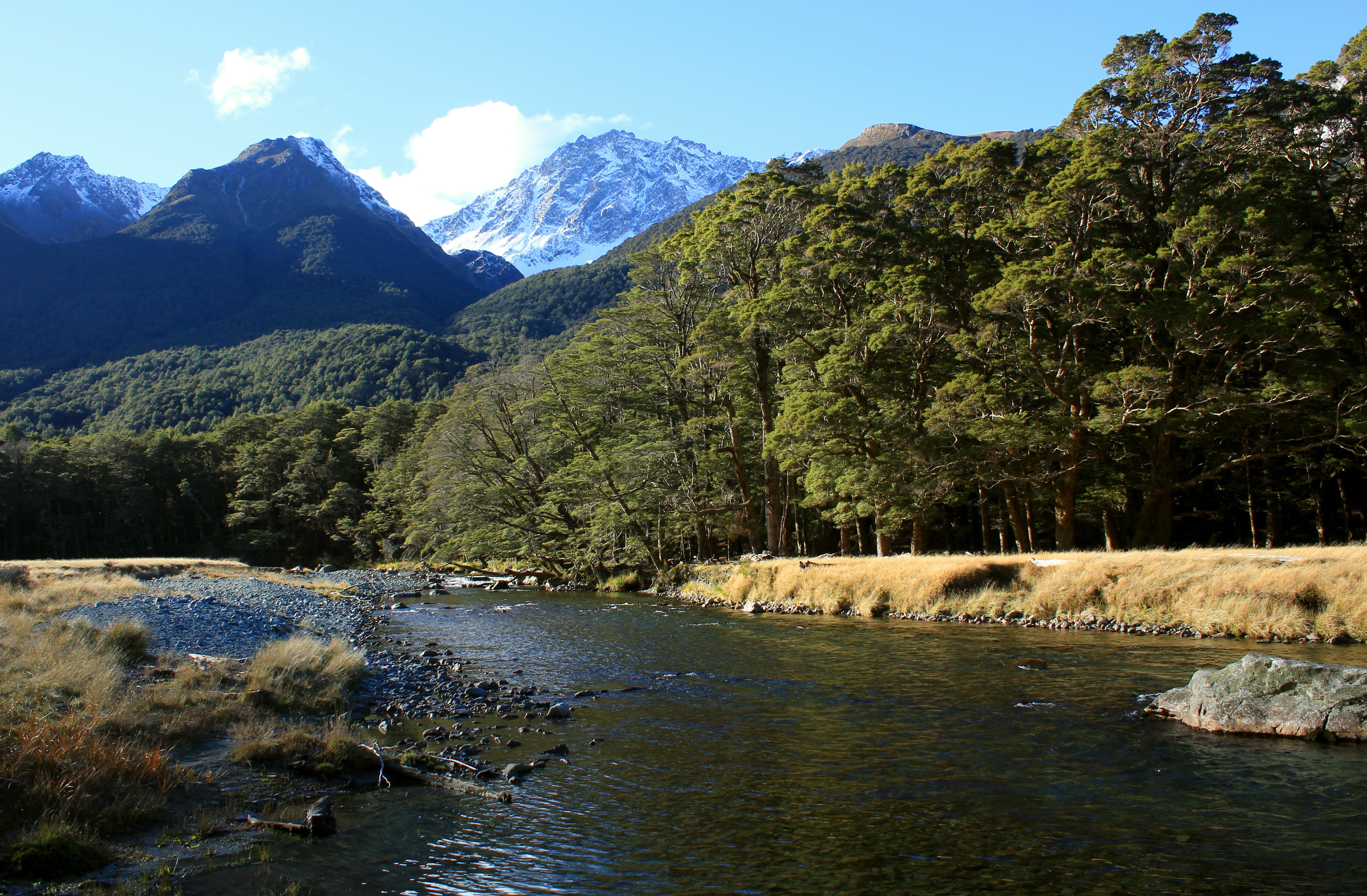

Location
- Country: New Zealand

Physical characteristics
- Mouth
  - location: Greenstone River

The Caples River is a river flowing into the Greenstone River in New Zealand. It originates north of Jean Batten Peak and flows alongside part of the Caples Track.

== See also ==
- List of rivers of New Zealand
- Greenstone and Caples Tracks
