= Norbay =

Freight vessel operated by P&O

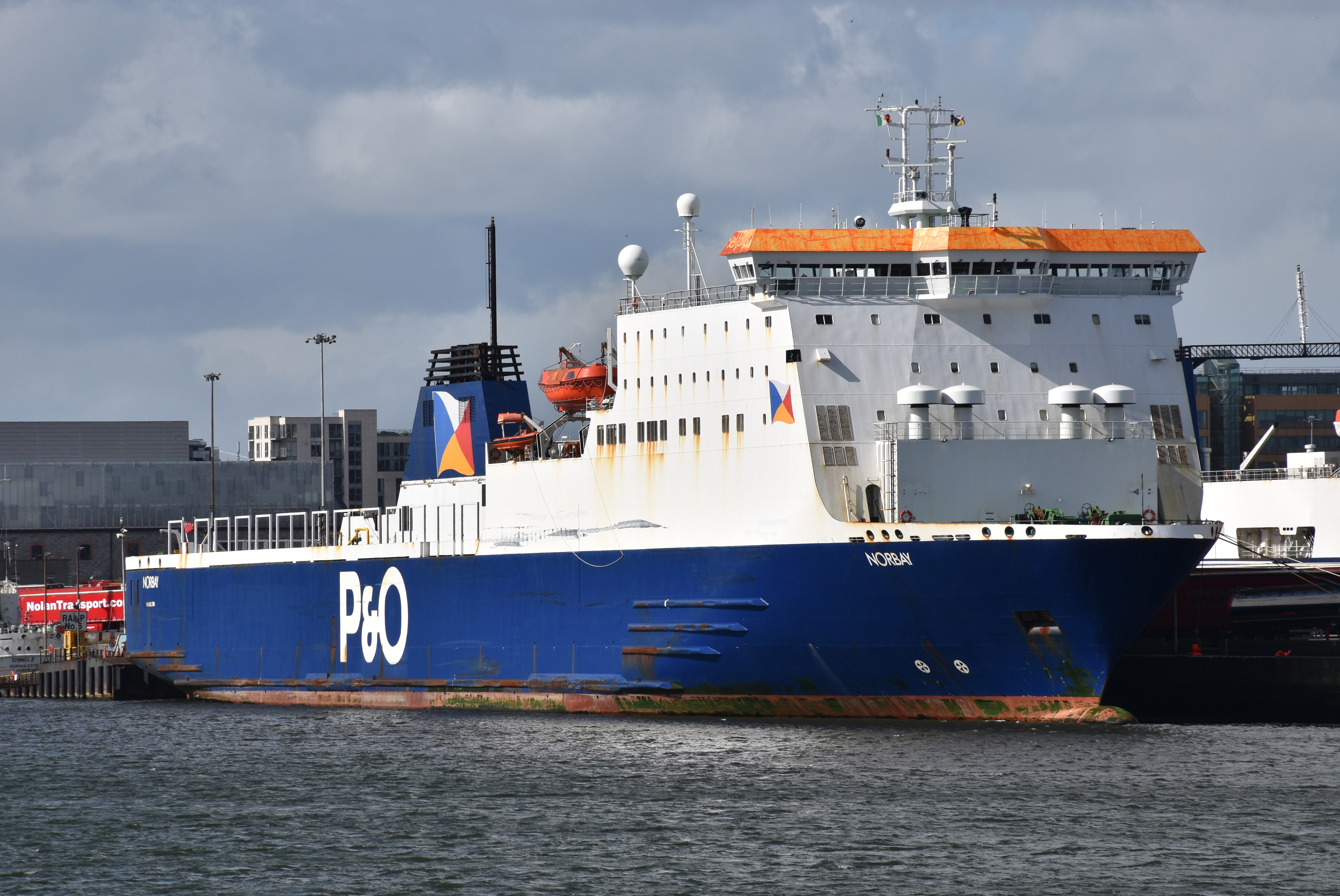
- Norbay

History
- Name: Norbay
- Owner: 1993–1996: Nedlloyd; 1996–2002: P&O North Sea Ferries; 2002-2010: P&O Irish Sea; 2010 onwards: P&O Ferries
- Operator: 1993–1996: North Sea Ferries; 1996–2002: P&O North Sea Ferries; 2002–2010: P&O Irish Sea; 2010–2023: P&O Ferries; 2023–2024: Irish Ferries; 2024–2026: P&O Ferries; 2026-present: Brittany Ferries
- Port of registry: Hamilton, Bermuda
- Route: 1993-2002: Hull – Rotterdam; 2002-2023: Liverpool – Dublin; 2023-2024:Dublin – Holyhead/Cherbourg; 2024: Pembroke Dock – Rosslare; 2024–2026: Tilbury – Rotterdam; 2026-: Cherbourg - Rosslare
- Builder: Van der Giessen de Noord
- Yard number: 962
- Launched: 13 November 1993
- Acquired: February 1994
- Identification: IMO number: 9056595; MMSI number: 310362000; Callsign: ZCDD8
- Status: In service

General characteristics
- Class & type: RoPax freight ferry
- Tonnage: 17,464 GT
- Length: 166.77 metres (547.1 ft)
- Beam: 23.4 metres (77 ft)
- Draft: 5.8 metres (19 ft)
- Installed power: 2 x Sulzer 9 ZA40S diesel engines and 2 x Sulzer 8 ZA40S diesel engines producing 24,480kW in total
- Propulsion: 2 x controllable pitch propellers 2 x transverse forward thrusters
- Speed: 22 knots (25 mph)
- Capacity: 2,040 lanemetres; 114 passengers
- Crew: 57

Norbay is a roll-on/roll-off vessel owned by P&O Ferries and chartered to Brittany Ferries. She was built by Van der Giessen de Noord in The Netherlands in 1994.

== History ==
Norbay was built in Rotterdam in 1994 by Van der Giessen de Noord. She was originally built for Nedlloyd to be placed on the Hull to Rotterdam route with 2040 lane metres of freight and a gross tonnage of 17,464.

However, in 1996 Norbay, while still retaining the same name, route and livery was bought by P&O North sea ferries.

In 2002, the Norsea and Norsun were replaced by the much larger Pride of Hull and Pride of Rotterdam and as a result, Norbay and Norbank became surplus to requirement and were removed from the Hull to Rotterdam route before being transferred to the Irish Sea and entering service on the Liverpool to Dublin route.

Due to restrictions on length at the P&O North Channel berths, Norbay has provided refit cover for both European Causeway and European Highlander in previous years as she is one of the few remaining P&O vessels which can fit within these restrictions. In 2017, the Dover based freighter, European Seaway provided refit relief instead, taking advantage of the fact that the now upgraded berth at Cairnryan can handle larger vessels. Due to the layup of the European Seaway, Norbay provided refit cover for the European Causeway in September/October 2021. This was the first time she had done so since 2015, though she had visited the port in 2018 for a one-off freight-only sailing.

Preceding the closure of P&O Ferries’ Liverpool to Dublin service, Norbay was chartered to Irish Ferries initially for a period of six months and placed on the Dublin to Holyhead and Cherbourg routes entering service on 5 November 2023. From 31 January 2024 she swapped routes with Oscar Wilde moving to the Pembroke Dock to Rosslare route, she remains on the route’s timetable until September 2024. Irish Ferries market the ship as an economy class service with limited passenger facilities.

In March 2026, the Norbay commenced a 12 month bareboat charter to Brittany Ferries to operate between Cherbourg and Rosslare. There is an option to extend the lease for a further 12 months.

== Design ==
The design on the Norbay and Norbank is an evolution of the design used for five freight ferries built by Finacantieri and Van der Giessen for Italy's Viamare sea motorway project. As they were designed as freighters, Norbay and her sister do not have the passenger facilities of vessels on similar passenger routes, though they still have basic facilities for tourist passengers and commercial drivers on their present route.
