= North Sea Ferries =

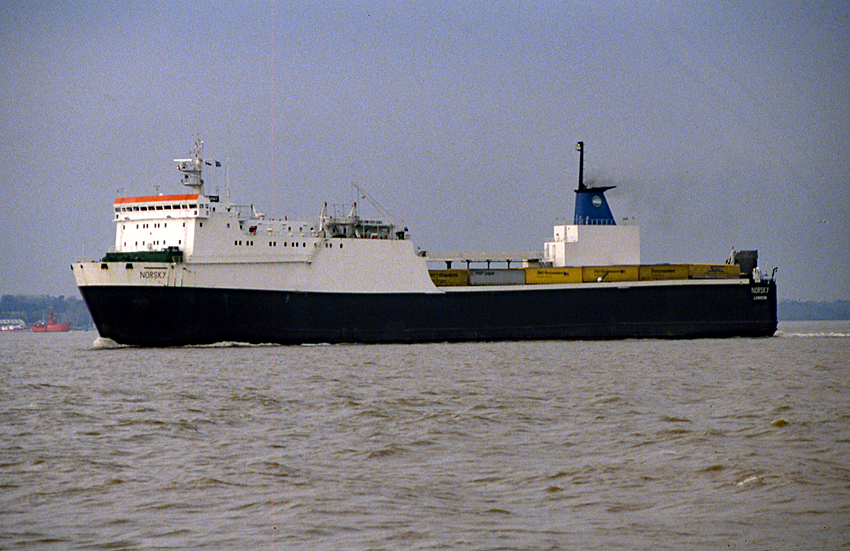
- Norsky departing from Ipswich in 1993
- Company type: Joint venture
- Industry: Shipping
- Founded: 1965
- Founder: A Kirsten; Argo Reederei Richard Adler & Söhne; General Steam Navigation Company; Koninklijke Nederlandse Stoomboot-Maatschappij; Phs. van Ommeren; Tyne Tees Steam Shipping Company
- Defunct: 1996
- Fate: Merged with P&O North Sea Ferries
- Successor: P&O Ferries
- Headquarters: Kingston upon Hull, England
- Area served: Belgium; Netherlands; United Kingdom
- Parent: Nedlloyd (50%); P&O (50%)

North Sea Ferries was a ferry operator that operated services between the United Kingdom, Belgium and The Netherlands from 1965 until 1996.

== History ==
=== Background ===
North Sea Ferries formed in 1965 by a consortium of six European concerns (two British, two German and two Dutch) to operate a ferry service between Hull and Rotterdam Europoort. The original consortium members were Tyne Tees Steam Shipping Company (at that time part of Coast Lines), General Steam Navigation Company (majority owned by P&O), Argo Reederei Richard Adler & Söhne, A. Kirsten, Koninklijke Nederlandse Stoomboot-Maatschappij and Phs. van Ommeren.

=== Early Years ===
Even before commencement of the Hull-Rotterdam service, North Sea Ferries were already exploring the potential for new routes between Britain and Europe. The Rotterdam service commenced operations in December 1965.

The remains of Coast Lines was acquired by P&O in 1971 and combined with the operations of General Steam Navigation to form the basis of P&O Ferries, with P&O therefore now directly holding an increased stake in the North Sea Ferries joint venture. A. Kirsten were declared bankrupt in October 1975.

=== Takeover ===
By 1980, Van Ommeren and Argo Reederei were reported as having little interest in North Sea Ferries and a proposal was made for their remaining minority stakes to be sold to the other two remaining partners in the consortium (KNSM having merged with Nedlloyd). Thus, North Sea Ferries became jointly owned by Nedlloyd and P&O.

In 1987, the Princess Margaret Ferry Terminal was built under the operation of North Sea Ferries. The building is now under the ownership of Associated British Ports and is operated by P&O Ferries.

=== Final Years ===
North Sea Ferries operated until 1996, when Nedlloyd's share of the venture was purchased by P&O giving them sole ownership. After this point operations were merged into P&O as P&O North Sea Ferries as part of the reorganisation of P&O Ferries arising from the merger of its Dover Straits services with those of Stena Line. P&O North Sea Ferries was then merged with P&O Ferries in 2003.

== Fleet ==
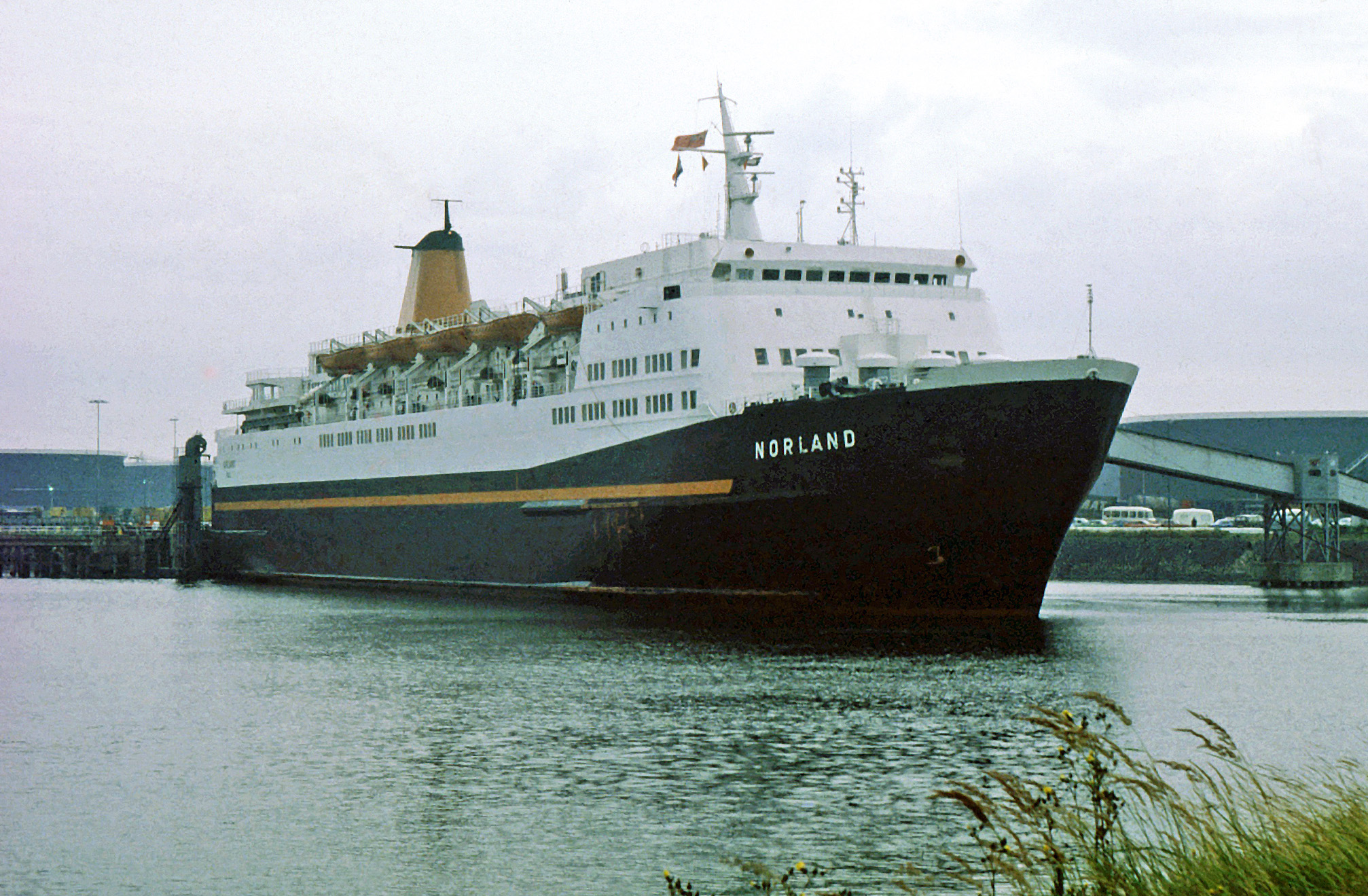
Norland in 1979 at Rotterdam

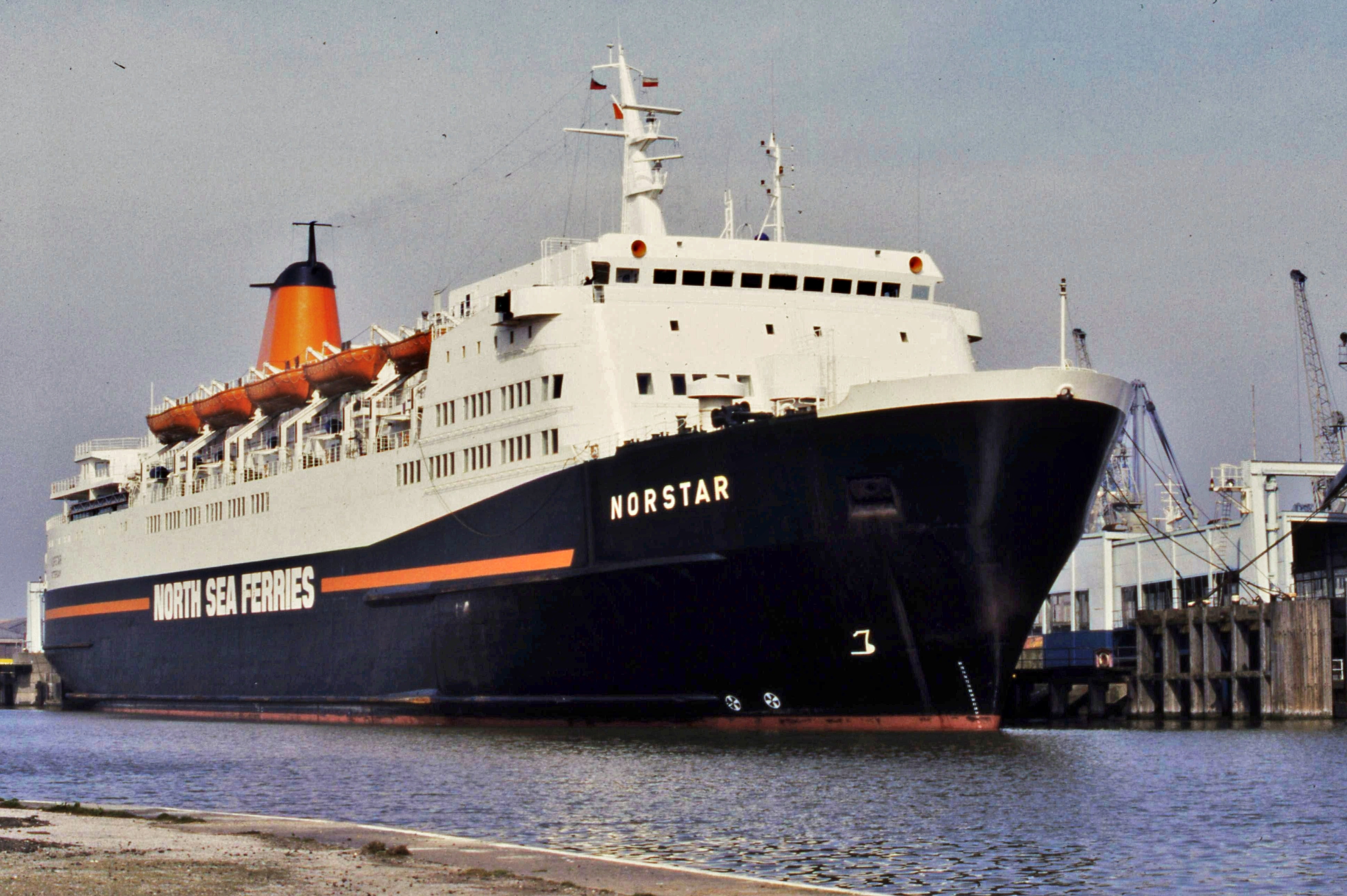
Norstar in 1984 at Hull

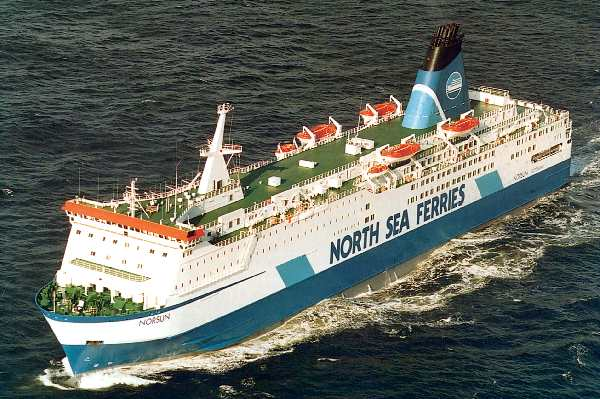
Norsun in 1987

Name	Built	In service	Tonnage	History
Norwave	1965 (AG Weser, Bremerhaven, Germany)	1965–1987	4,000 GT	Scrapped at Drapetzona Shipyard in 1988 after an explosion
Norwind	1966 (AG Weser, Bremerhaven, Germany)	1965–1987	4,000 GT	Scrapped at Aliağa Ship Breaking Yard in 1995 after fire the previous year at Piraeus
Norland	1974 (AG Weser, Bremerhaven, Germany)	1974–1996	12,998 GT (before lengthening); 15,047 GT (after lengthening)	Served as a troop ship during Falklands War, lengthened in 1987, scrapped at Alang Ship Breaking Yard in 2010
Norstar	1974 (AG Weser, Bremerhaven, Germany)	1974–1996	12,998 GT (before lengthening); 15,047 GT (after lengthening)	Lengthened in 1987, scrapped at Alang Ship Breaking Yard in 2010
Norsea; Norsky	1979 (Mitsui Engineering & Shipbuilding Co, Tamano, Japan)	1981–1986; 1986-1996	6,310 GRT	Scrapped at Aliağa Ship Breaking Yard in 2011
Norsea	1987 (Govan Shipbuilders, Glasgow, Scotland)	1987–1996	31,598 GT	Scrapped at Aliağa Ship Breaking Yard in 2025
Norsun	1987 (Nippon Kokan K.K., Tsurumi-ku, Yokohama, Japan)	1987–1996	31,598 GT	Scrapped at Aliağa Ship Breaking Yard in 2025
Norcape	1979 (Mitsui Engineering & Shipbuilding Co, Tamano, Japan)	1988–1996	6,310 GRT	Scrapped at Aliağa Ship Breaking Yard in 2011
Norbank	1993 (Van der Giessen de Noord, Krimpen aan den IJssel, Netherlands)	1993–1996		Currently in service (as of 2025) as DP World Express with DP World
Norbay	1994 (Van der Giessen de Noord, Krimpen aan den IJssel, Netherlands)	1994–1996		Currently in service (as of 2025) with P&O Ferries

== Routes ==
- (United Kingdom) Hull - (Netherlands) Rotterdam 1965-1996
- (United Kingdom) Hull - (Belgium) Zeebrugge 1974-1996
- (United Kingdom) Ipswich - (Netherlands) Rotterdam 1977-1996
- (United Kingdom) Middlesbrough - (Belgium) Zeebrugge 1988-1996

== Former North Sea Ferries routes today ==
The former North Sea Ferries route between Hull and Rotterdam continues to be operated by P&O Ferries.

A service between Ipswich and Rotterdam was latterly operated by Luxembourg-based CLdN. This route was closed by the company in August 2012.

Sailings by P&O between Hull and Zeebrugge ceased in January 2021 due to the impact of the COVID-19 pandemic, although it was noted at the time of the closure announcement by Darren Procter of the RMT Union that it had been a "challenging route for a number of years".

In July 2025, P&O Ferries announced it was closing the route between Middlesbrough and Zeebrugge at the end of the month to focus on other routes.
