= GNV Antares =

Ferry, in service 1987–2025

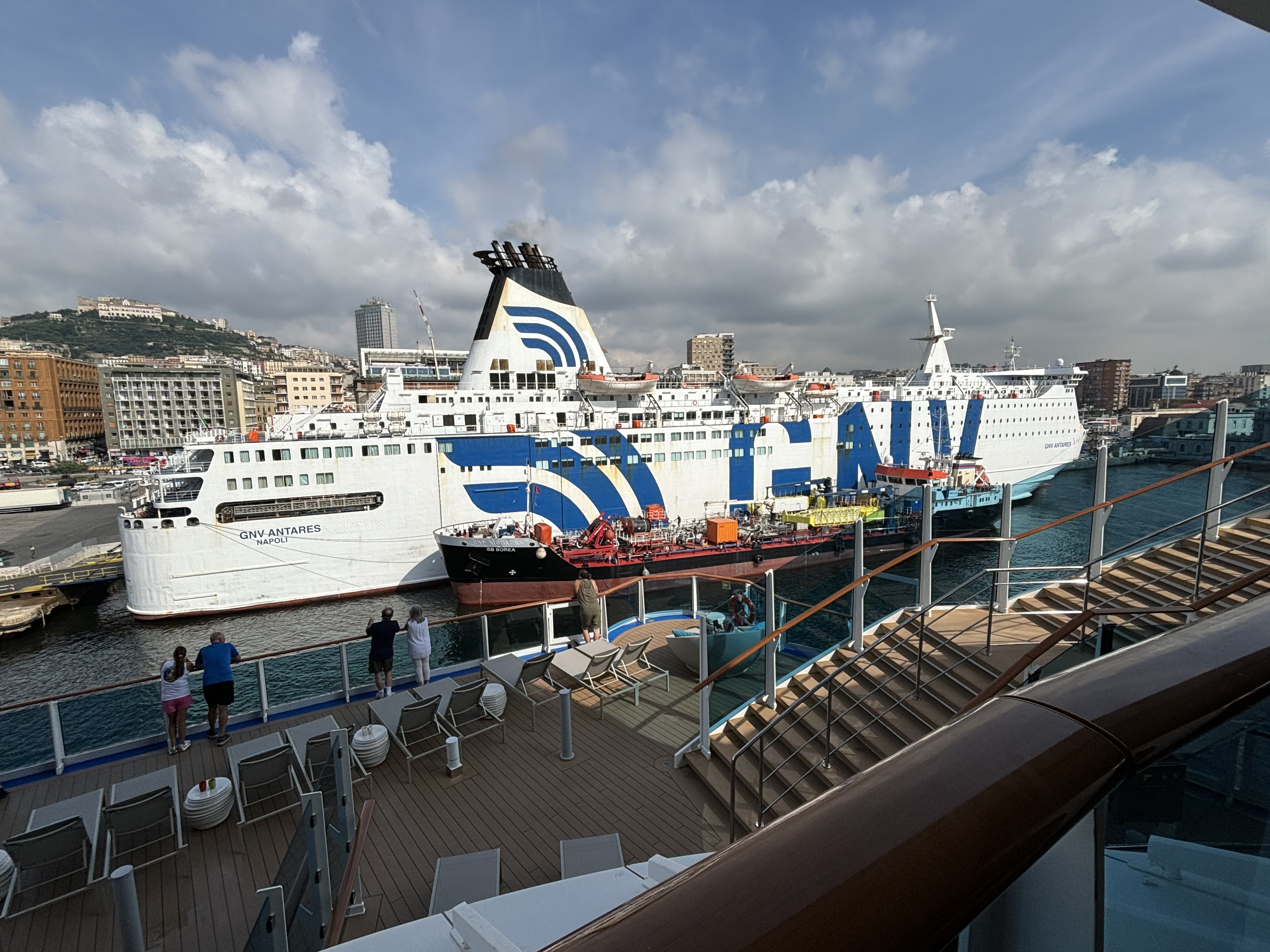
- GNV Antares in Naples

History
- Name: Norsun (1987–2003); Pride of Bruges (2003–2020); GNV Antares (2021–2025)
- Owner: Nedlloyd (1987–1996); P&O Ferries (1996–2021); Grandi Navi Veloci (2021–2025)
- Operator: North Sea Ferries (1987–1996); P&O Ferries (1996–2021); Grandi Navi Veloci (2021–2025)
- Port of registry: 1987–2021: Rotterdam, Netherlands; 2021: Limassol, Cyprus; 2021–2025: Naples, Italy; 2025: Lisbon, Portugal
- Route: Kingston upon Hull–Rotterdam (1987–2002); Hull–Zeebrugge (2002–2020); Naples–Palermo (2021–2025)
- Builder: NKK, Japan
- Yard number: 1033
- Launched: August 1986
- Maiden voyage: May 1987
- Out of service: 2025
- Identification: IMO number: 8503797; MMSI number: 255917265
- Fate: Scrapped at Aliağa, 2025

General characteristics
- Tonnage: 31,598 GT
- Length: 179.35 m (588 ft 5 in)
- Beam: 25.09 m (82 ft 4 in)
- Draught: 6.10 m (20 ft 0 in)
- Installed power: 2 × Wärtsilä-Sulzer 9ZAL40; 2 × Wärtsilä-Sulzer 6ZAL40
- Propulsion: 2 × controllable pitch propellers; 2 × bow thrusters
- Speed: 19 kn (35 km/h)
- Capacity: 930 passengers; 850 cars

GNV Antares was a ropax ferry operated by Grandi Navi Veloci between Naples and Palermo, Italy. It entered service in 1987 as Norsun with North Sea Ferries and was later P&O Ferries' Pride of Bruges. It was scrapped in 2025.

== History ==
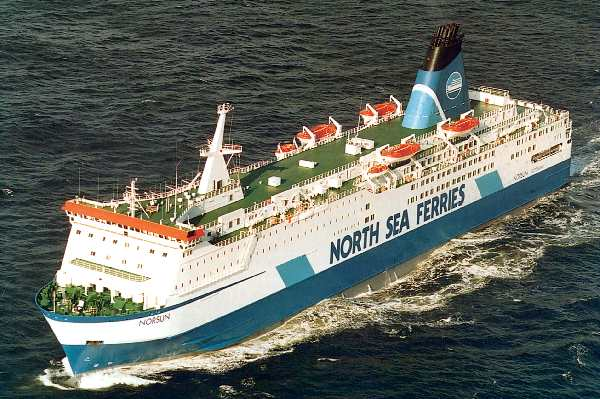
As Norsun in 1987

The ship was built in 1987 by Nippon Kokan K.K. Tsurumi Yard in Yokohama, Japan. The keel was laid in 1985 and the ship was launched in 1986. Upon completion, the ship entered service for North Sea Ferries, then a joint-venture between Dutch Nedlloyd and British P&O. The first years it sailed on the Rotterdam-Hull route with sister ship Norsea, replacing Norstar and Norland. Norsun sailed under the Dutch flag and was owned by the Dutch half of the joint-venture, while Norsea was British.

In 1996 ownership transferred to P&O Ferries when Nedlloyd sold its 50% stake to P&O. The ships sailed the Rotterdam route until 2001 when they were replaced by Pride of Rotterdam and Pride of Hull.

In 2002 the ships were transferred to the Zeebrugge-Hull route, again replacing Norstar and Norland. Norstar and Norsun were internally modernised before entering service on this new route as Pride of York and Pride of Bruges respectively.

In October 2016 it was announced that the two ships would be refitted in Poland.

In October 2020 P&O announced that Pride of Bruges and Pride of York were to be taken out of service due to the decline in traffic caused by the COVID-19 pandemic. On 15 December 2020, P&O announced that the service would be stopped from 1 January 2021. Both Pride of Bruges and sister ship Pride of York were sold to Grandi Navi Veloci. In December 2025 it arrived at Aliağa to be scrapped.

== Docking ==
=== Hull ===
Pride of Bruges docked at terminal 2, King George Dock, Hull. Just a few hundred yards away is the terminal for the Hull-Rotterdam ferries. To leave Hull the ship had to squeeze through the lock bow first which only has a few centimetres of clearance on each side. To come back to dock in Hull, it passed through the lock bow first before turning clockwise and reversing into the berth.

=== Zeebrugge ===
Zeebrugge was much easier to dock at compared to Hull. The ship simply sailed into Zeebrugge harbour, turned to starboard into a docking area just south of Albert-II Dok and backed into the berth, opening the stern door on the linkspan.

== Trivia ==
Pride of Bruges featured in episode three of the documentary Engineering Giants: Ferry Strip-Down, first broadcast on BBC Two on 29 July 2012. The sister ship, Pride of York, was also shown.
