= DP World Express =

Freight vessel operated by P&O

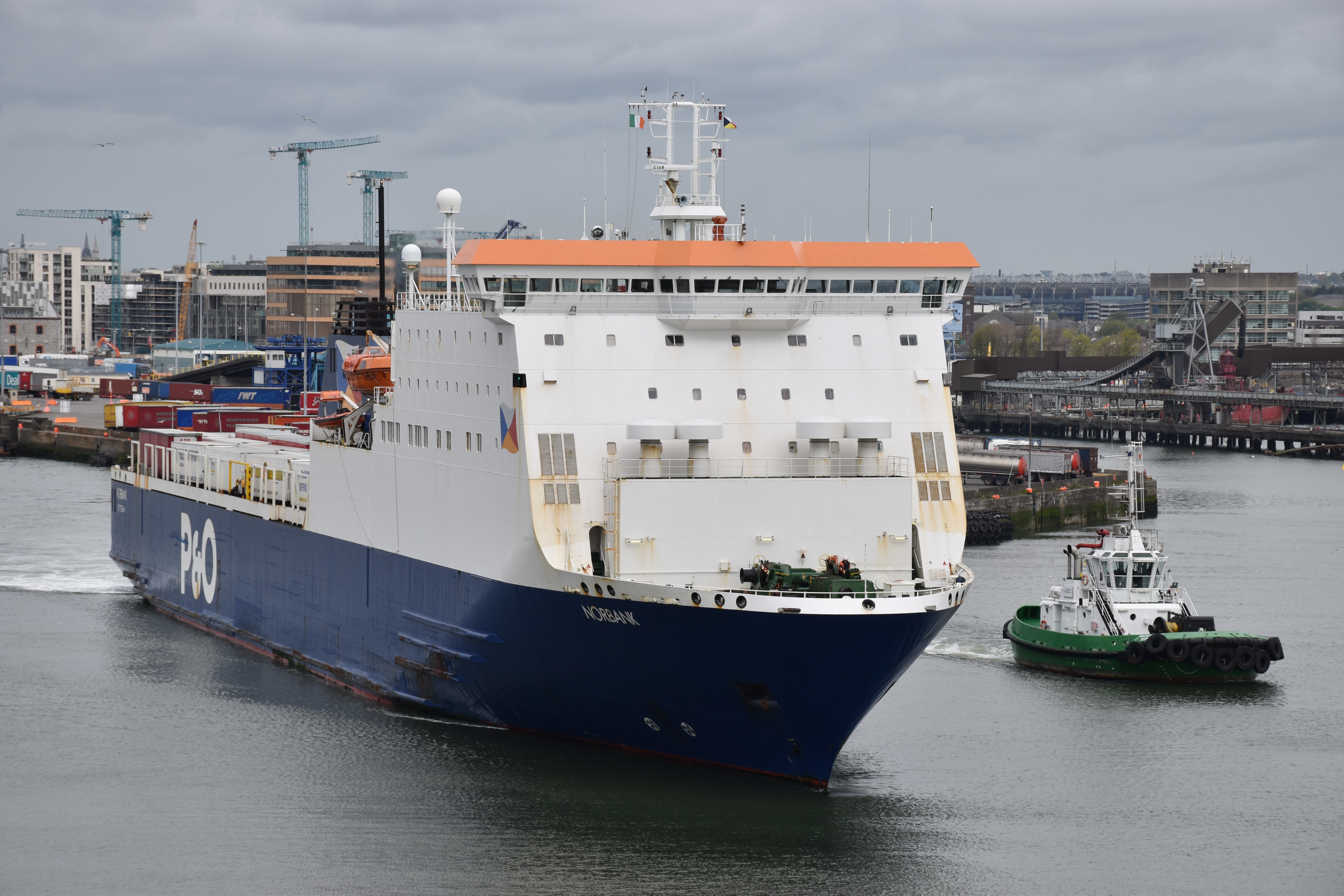
- Norbank

History
- Name: 1993–2025: Norbank; 2025–present: DP World Express
- Owner: Nedlloyd (1993–1996); P&O North Sea Ferries (1996–present)
- Operator: North Sea Ferries (1993–1997); P&O North Sea Ferries (1997–2002); P&O Irish Sea (2002–2010); P&O Ferries (2010–present)
- Port of registry: RotterdamNetherlands
- Route: Rotterdam – Tilbury
- Builder: Van der Giessen de Noord
- Yard number: 961
- Launched: 5 June 1993
- Completed: 29 October 1993
- Maiden voyage: 31 October 1993
- Identification: IMO number: 9056583; MMSI number: 246213000
- Status: In service

General characteristics
- Tonnage: 17,464 GT
- Length: 166.77 m (547 ft 2 in)
- Beam: 23.4 m (76 ft 9 in)
- Draft: 5.8 m (19 ft 0 in)
- Ramps: 1 external, 2 internal
- Installed power: 4 x Sulzer
- Speed: 22 knots (41 km/h; 25 mph)
- Capacity: 114 berths

The DP World Express is a roll-on/roll-off freight vessel owned and operated by the Emirati company DP World. She was built by Van der Giessen de Noord, Netherlands in 1993.

== History ==
The ship was launched as the Norbank in 1993 and was delivered by October 1993 to Nordzee Verdi Stone BV, the Netherlands and started operating between Hull and Rotterdam for North Sea Ferries. She was chartered to P&O in January 1997 and remained on the Rotterdam route where she then transferred to the Felixstowe to Rotterdam route, before going to the Irish Sea to start operating for P&O Irish Sea between Liverpool and Dublin.

After P&O Irish Sea was renamed, she transferred to P&O Ferries on the Irish Sea where she operated for more than 20 years. On the termination of the Liverpool to Dublin route by P&O Ferries at the end of 2023 she transferred to Rotterdam-Europoort. From there she did relief sailings on her original route to Hull covering for the Pride of Rotterdam which was in drydock. From March 2024 she operated a brand new route from Rotterdam to Tilbury. First as a freight only service but after May 2024 also for freight passengers.

In March 2025, the Norbank was transferred to DP World, the owner of P&O Ferries. Renamed DP World Express, she was placed on the newly launched Dubai to Umm Qasr service from December 2025.
