= GNV Aries =

Ferry operated by GNV

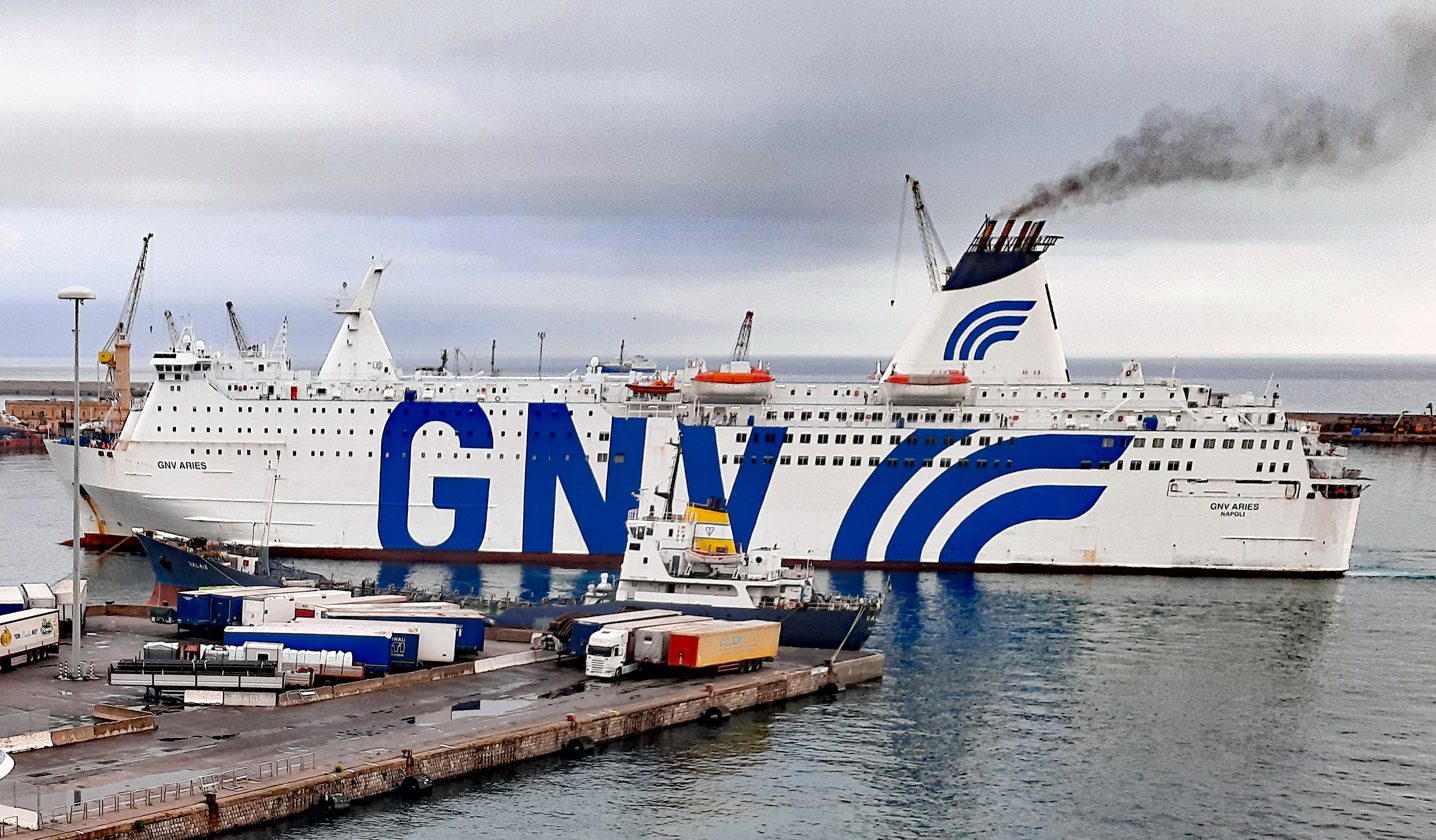
- GNV Aries in Palermo (2021)

History
- Name: 1987–2003: Norsea; 2003–2021: Pride of York; 2021–2024: GNV Aries; 2024–2025: Ari
- Owner: 1987–2003: North Sea Ferries; 2003–2021: P&O Ferries; 2021–2024: MSC / Grandi Navi Veloci; 2024–2025: Dido Steel Co.
- Operator: 1987–2003: North Sea Ferries; 2003–2021: P&O Ferries; 2021–2024: Grandi Navi Veloci
- Port of registry: 1987–2011: Hull, United Kingdom; 2011–2021: Nassau, Bahamas; 2021: Limassol, Cyprus; 2021–2024: Naples, Italy; 2024: Limassol, Cyprus; 2024–2025: Lomé, Togo
- Route: Naples – Palermo; Former: Zeebrugge – Hull; Former: Rotterdam – Hull
- Builder: Govan Shipbuilders; Govan, Scotland
- Yard number: 265
- Laid down: 24 August 1985
- Launched: 9 September 1986
- Christened: 9 September 1986
- Completed: 2 May 1987
- Maiden voyage: 8 May 1987
- In service: 1987
- Out of service: 29 July 2024
- Identification: IMO number: 8501957; Call sign: ICGT; MMSI number: 247435700
- Fate: Scrapped

General characteristics
- Class & type: Cruise ferry
- Tonnage: 31,598 GT; 18,197 NT; 6,545 DWT
- Length: 179.2 m (587 ft 11 in)
- Beam: 25.4 m (83 ft 4 in)
- Draft: 6.13 m (20 ft 1 in)
- Decks: 11
- Ramps: Stern vehicle loading ramps
- Installed power: 2 × Wärtsilä-Sulzer 9ZAL40 diesel engines; 2 × Wärtsilä-Sulzer 6ZAL40 diesel engines (total 18,390 kW)
- Propulsion: 2 × controllable pitch propellers
- Speed: 19.0 knots (35.2 km/h; 21.9 mph)
- Capacity: 1,108 passengers; 350 cabins; 850 cars or 2,250 lane metres for freight
- Crew: 40

GNV Aries was a ferry built as Norsea for North Sea Ferries as part of its response to the need for larger vessels in the mid to late 1980s. The 1974 ships MV Norland and MV Norstar were proving to be very popular, and were running at capacity. Therefore, North Sea Ferries designed its "3rd Generation" overnight ferry. The two parent companies within North Sea Ferries placed orders in two separate locations. P&O placed its at Govan Shipbuilders on the River Clyde, and Nedlloyd placed its order with NKK in Yokohama, Japan.

Norsea entered service on the Hull–Rotterdam route. She was the largest passenger ship to be built on the River Clyde since Queen Elizabeth 2. It was also the last large passenger ship to be built in the United Kingdom. In May 2001, now owned and operated by P&O Ferries ordered Pride of Hull and Pride of Rotterdam. Once relieved of service on the Hull–Rotterdam route, the ship was sent off for two months major refurbishment and branding realignment, prior to entering service on the Hull–Zeebrugge route, and replacing the 27-year-old Norland in the new P&O colours.

The ship's name was renamed from Norsea to Pride of York.

In October 2020, P&O announced that the sister ships, and Pride of York and Pride of Bruges were to be withdrawn due to the decline in traffic caused by the COVID-19 pandemic. The final service from Hull left on 9 December 2020.

In 2021, both were sold to Grandi Navi Veloci with Pride of York being renamed GNV Aries.

In October 2024, GNV Aries was sold to Aliağa Ship Breaking Yard, Turkey for scrap arriving in January 2025.

== Accidents and incidents ==
- On 5 February 1992, the lifeboat launching equipment at No 3 lifeboat station suffered a catastrophic failure during operational tests. The damage was very serious, to both the lifeboat and the vessel itself. The lifeboat then fell onto the dockside, where two of the four men on board the lifeboat were killed. The ship was under the operation of North Sea Ferries at the time of the accident.
- On 14 August 2002, Norsea had a fire in the forward engine room. This was caused by ignition of thermal heating oil, which leaked during repairs.
- On 2 September 2002, her aft engine room suffered a fire whilst on passage from Hull to Zeebrugge. She was about 7 miles off the East Anglian coast. The necessary steps were taken to extinguish the fire and no passengers were injured. However the third engineer was affected by smoke inhalation. The fire was caused by the failure of a low pressure fuel pipe on the main diesel generator. There were no connections between the two fires.
- On 17 March 2014 the ferry suffered a 20 mm (0.79 in) gash caused by metal protruding from the lock gate at King George Dock. It meant that the ferry did not depart until 6am the next day, resulting in 168 passengers walking off and cancelling their trip. P&O Ferries spokesman Brian Reese said: "We want all our passengers to get away on their trip in good time, unfortunately this isn't always possible. People worked very hard through the night to get the ship away in the morning. In transport, we get technical glitches from time to time but, everyone did their best in the circumstances." More than 230 passengers stayed on board, many of whom are thought to have been long-distance lorry drivers.

== Gallery ==
Norsea - Pride of York - GNV Aries

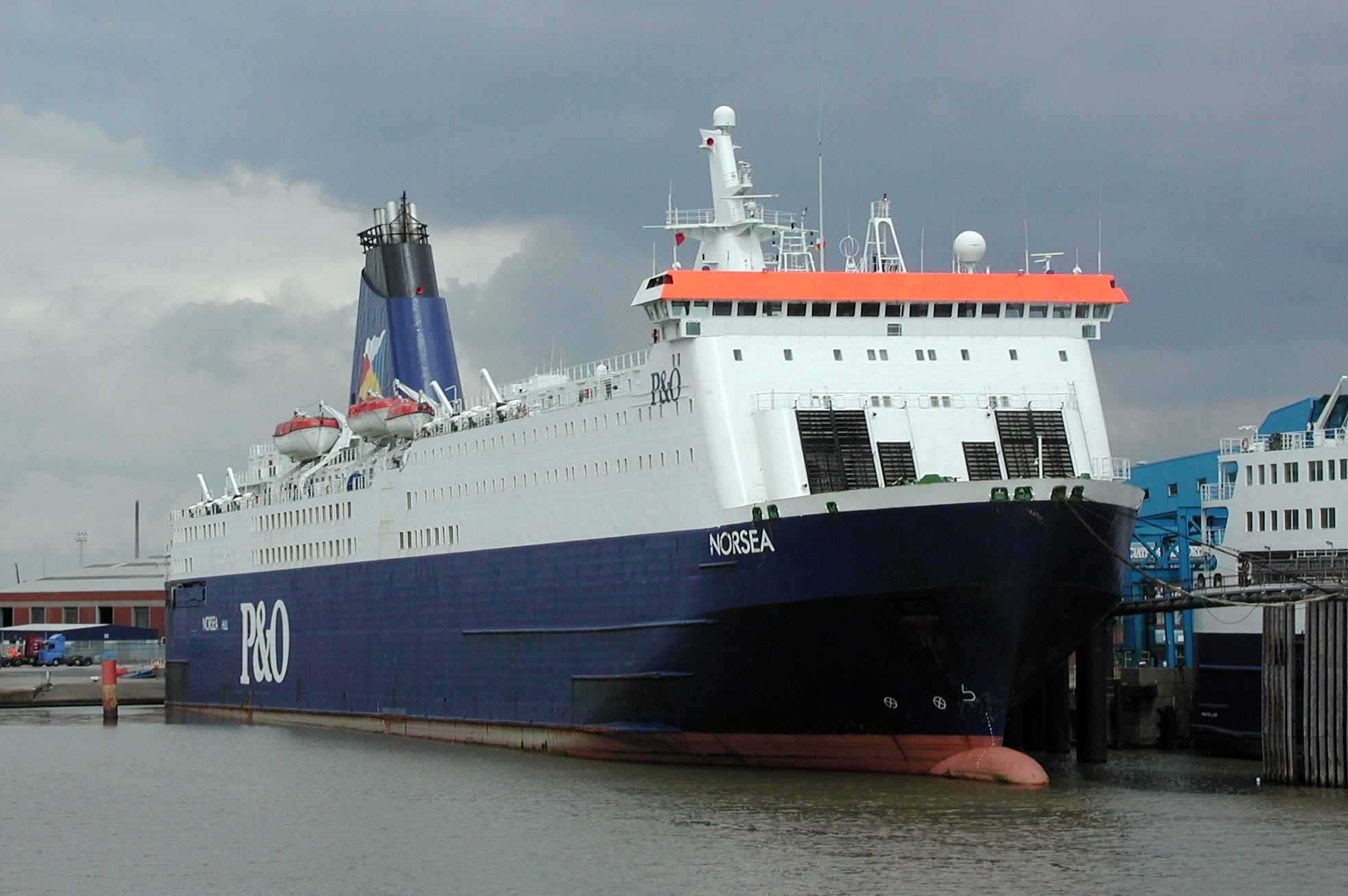
As Norsea at her homeport Hull (2001)

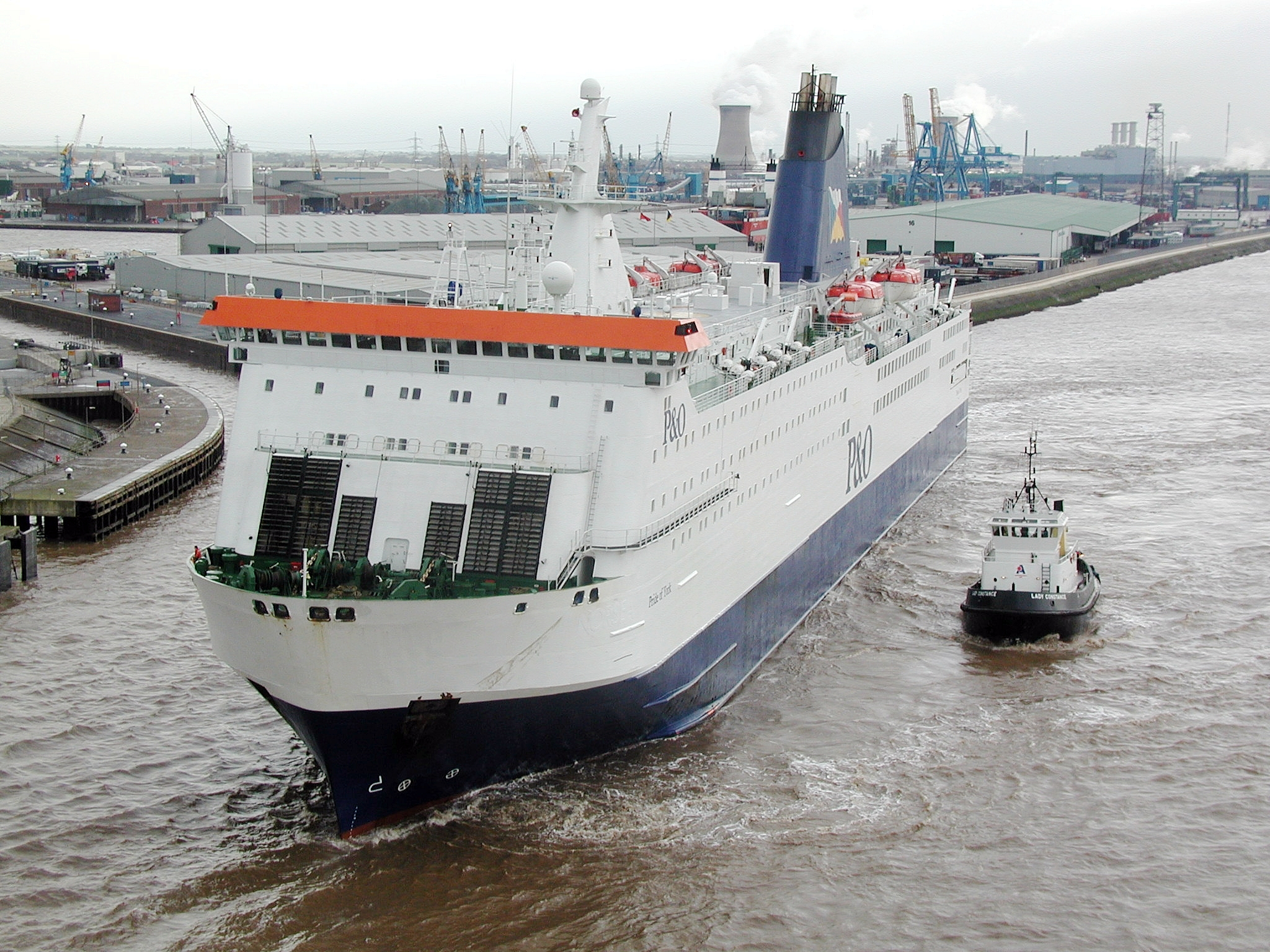
Pride of York arriving at Hull (2003)

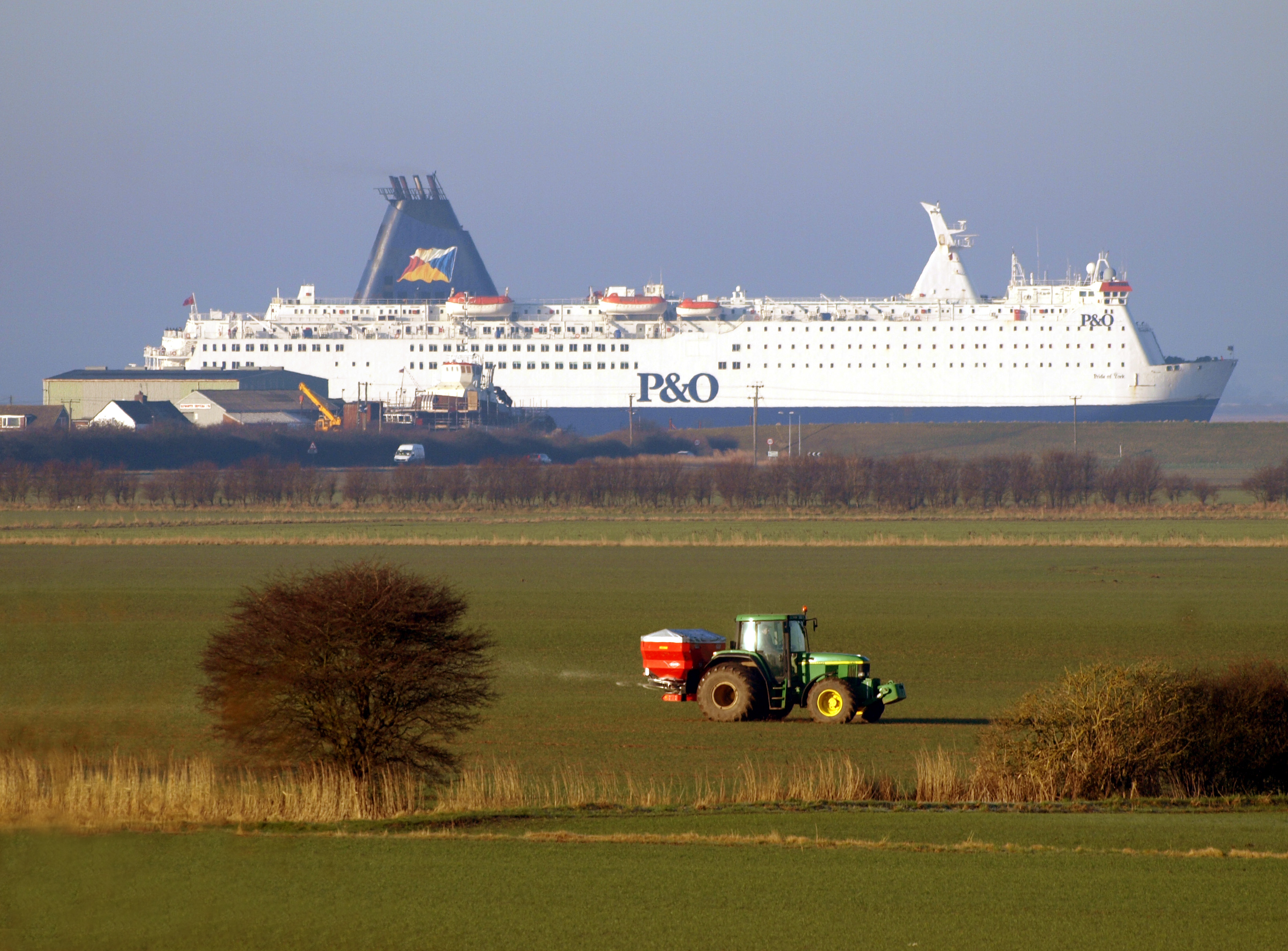
Pride of York (2010)
