= Hilma Hooker =

Shipwreck in Bonaire in the Caribbean Netherlands

Coordinates: 12°06′18.4″N 68°17′18.7″W

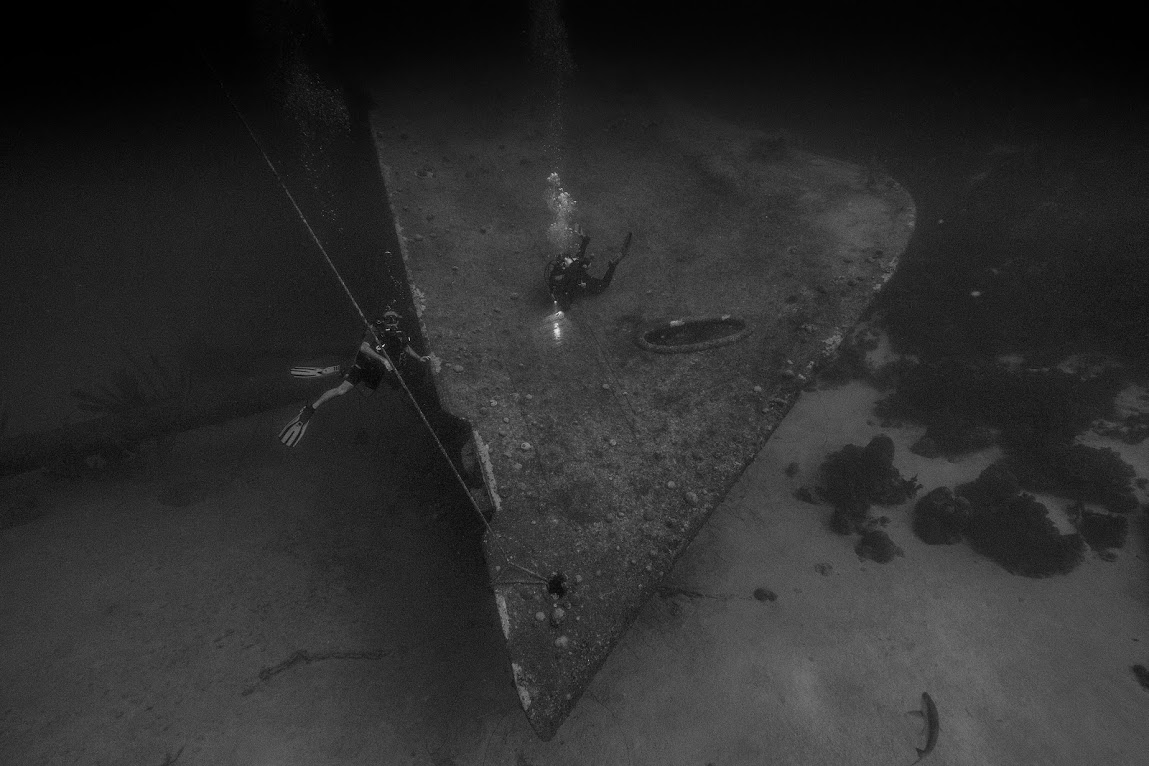
- The bow of Hilma Hooker

History
- Name: Midsland (1951–1964); Mistral (1964–1967); William Express (1967–1975); Anna C. (1975–1976); Doric Express (1976–1979); Hilma Hooker (1979–1984)
- Owner: Scheepvaart En Steenkolen Mij. N. V., Netherlands (1951–1964); Caribbean Association Traders, Panama (1964–1967); Bahamas Line, Panama (1967–1975); Benjamin Catrone, Panama (1975–1976); Seacoast Shipping Corp., Panama (1976–1979); San Andrés Shipping Line, Colombia (1979–1984)
- Builder: Van der Giessen de Noord, Krimpen aan den IJssel, Netherlands
- Yard number: 758
- Launched: 21 May 1951
- Identification: IMO number: 5234515
- Fate: Sank at Bonaire, 12 September 1984

General characteristics
- Type: Cargo ship
- Tonnage: 691 GRT; 1,025 DWT
- Length: 71.78 m (235 ft 6 in)
- Beam: 11.01 m (36 ft 1 in)
- Depth: 3.81 m (12 ft 6 in)
- Propulsion: 1 × Werkspoor 1,260 bhp (940 kW) 6-cylinder diesel engine, 1 shaft
- Speed: 12 knots (22 km/h; 14 mph)

Hilma Hooker was a cargo ship constructed in the Netherlands, launched in 1951 as Midsland. In 1964, the vessel was renamed Mistral after being sold and renamed Anna C in 1976 after being sold again. In 1976 the vessel was acquired by a new company and renamed Doric Express, and again in 1979, acquired the final name of Hilma Hooker. After being seized in a drug smuggling investigation, the vessel sank at Bonaire in the Caribbean Netherlands. The shipwreck It is a popular wreck diving site.

== Ship history ==
The vessel was built at the Van der Giessen de Noord shipyard in Krimpen aan den IJssel, Netherlands, for the shipping company Scheepvaart En Steenkolen Mij. N. V. She was launched on 21 May 1951 and named Midsland. In 1964 the ship was sold to Caribbean Association Traders of Panama, and renamed Mistral. She was sold again in 1967 to the Bahamas Line and renamed William Express. On 16 July 1975, she ran aground 30 miles (48 km) north of Acklins Island, which is the same latitude as Samana Cays, which sparked the rumour that it had sunk for the first time at Samana Bay in the Dominican Republic. On 23 July 1975, she was pulled afloat and towed towards Miami where her cargo was off loaded. She was sold with the purpose to be scrapped. Apparently she was sold to Benjamin Catrone of Panama and renamed Anna C. The ship was soon sold again being bought in 1976 by the Seacoast Shipping Corp. of Panama and renamed Doric Express. Finally, in 1979 she was sold to the San Andrés Shipping Line of San Andrés, Colombia, and renamed Hilma Hooker.

=== Sinking ===
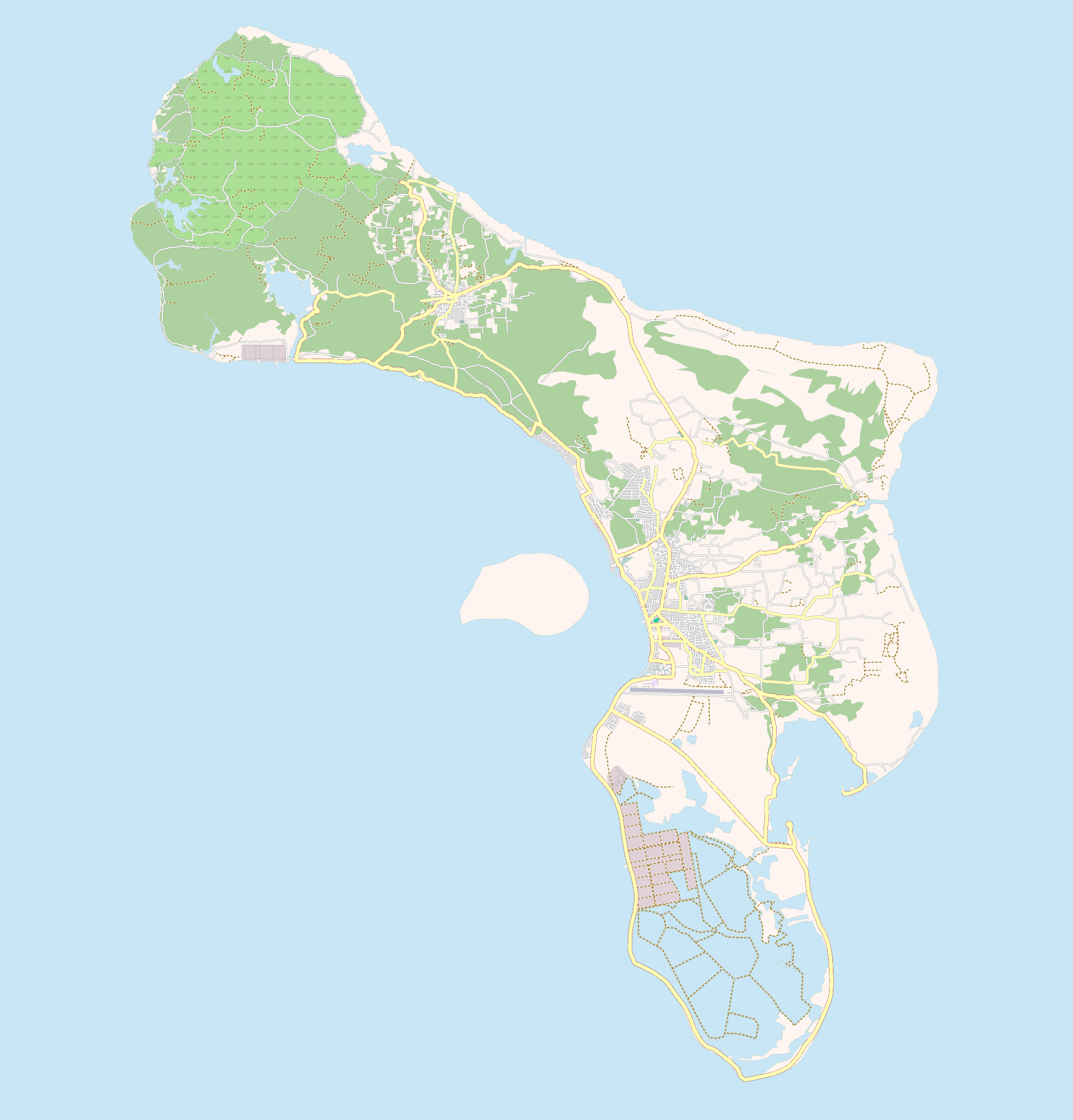
Caribbean Netherlands
Hilma Hooker (Caribbean)

In mid 1984, the Hilma Hooker had engine problems at sea and was towed to the port of Kralendijk, Bonaire. The vessel was already under surveillance by drug enforcement agencies. Docked at the Town Pier, local authorities boarded the ship for an inspection when her captain was unable to produce any of the requisite registration papers. A false bulkhead was discovered, and held within was 25,000 lb (11,000 kg) of marijuana. The Hilma Hooker and her crew were subsequently detained while the local authorities on Bonaire searched for the vessel's owners, who were never found.

The ship languished under detention as evidence for many months and through general neglect of her hull she began to take on considerable amounts of water. It was feared that she would sink at the main dock on the island and disrupt maritime traffic. After many months of being tied to the pier and pumped of water, on 7 September 1984 the Hilma Hooker was towed to an anchorage. As the days passed, a slight list became noticeable. The list was even more obvious one morning. The owner was still not coming forward to claim the ship and maintain it so the many leaks added up until on the morning of 12 September 1984 the Hilma Hooker began taking in water through her lower portholes. At 9:08 am she rolled over on her starboard side and, in the next two minutes, disappeared.

== Dive site ==
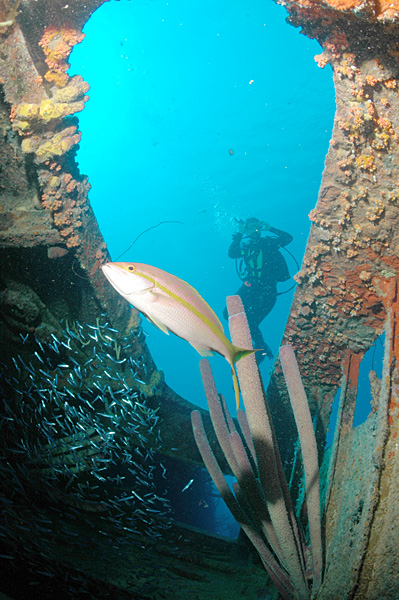
Diver on Hilma Hooker

The Hilma Hooker came to rest on a sand flat between two coral reef systems in an area known to divers as Angel City. The wreck has subsequently become a prime attraction for scuba divers. It lies in approximately 100 feet (30 m) of water and at 240 feet (73 m) in length provides ample scope for exploration. However, relatively little of the wreck involves penetration diving.

The Hilma Hooker is regarded as one of the leading wreck diving sites in the Caribbean, according to Scuba Diving Travel Magazine.
