= MS European Envoy =

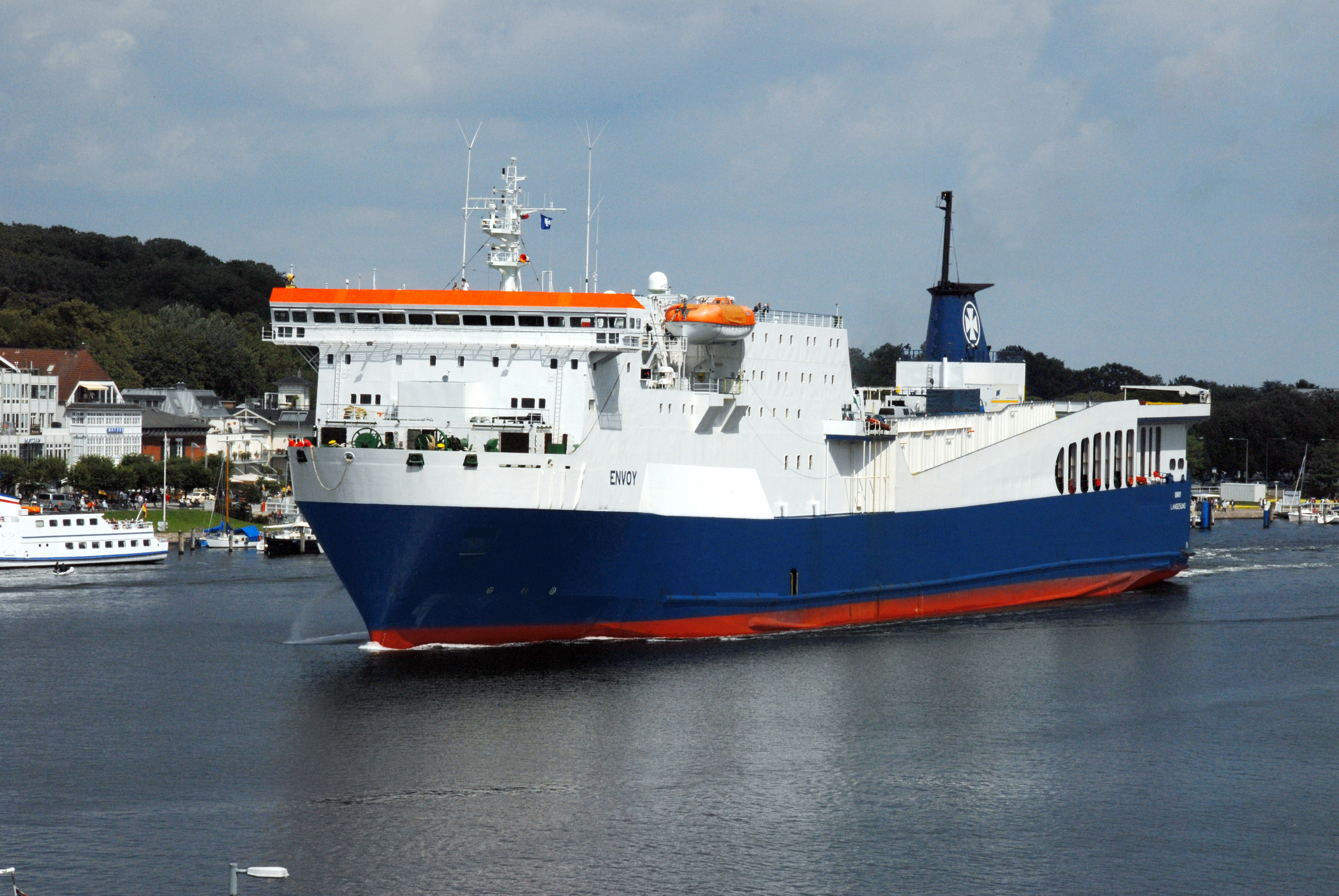

History
- Name: 2011–2012: Reyes B; 2004-2011: Envoy; 1998-2004: European Envoy; 1995-98: Ibex; 1986-95: Norsky; 1984-86: Norsea; 1979-84: Ibex
- Owner: 2012-2012: LEYAL Group; 2006-2012: DFDS; 2004-2005: Kystlink; 1979-2004: P&O Ferries
- Operator: 2004/5: Kystlink
- Route: 2005: IJmuiden and Harwich; 2001-04: Mostyn-Dublin; 1995-2001: Liverpool-Dublin; 1984-95: Europort-Ipswich; 1979-84: Fleetwood-Larne
- Builder: Mitsui Engineering & Shipbuilding, Tamano, Japan
- Yard number: 1163
- Launched: 27 December 1978
- Identification: IMO number: 7716074
- Fate: Scrapped 2012

General characteristics
- Tonnage: 6,310 GT
- Length: 150.02 metres (492.2 ft)
- Beam: 23 metres (75 ft)
- Draft: 5.1 metres (17 ft)
- Installed power: 2x Mitsui 12V42M
- Speed: 19.4 knots (22.3 mph)
- Capacity: 1,500 lanemetres; 12 berths; from 1996: 220 pax
- Crew: 36

MS European Envoy was an Iceclass III Ro-Ro Passenger Ferry vessel.

== History ==
Built as Ibex in 1979, by Mitsui Engineering & Shipbuilding, Japan, a sister to Puma. She entered service on the Fleetwood-Larne service. In 1984, as Norsea, she was transferred to the North Sea Ferries' Ipswich-Rotterdam (Europoort) service. In 1986, she was rename Norsky, releasing the original name for the new large passenger ferry Norsea. In 1995, she returned to the Irish Sea as Ibex, this time running Liverpool-Dublin. In 1996 she was substantially rebuilt, with a new upper trailer deck.

Renamed European Envoy in 1998, she moved to the Mostyn-Dublin route in 2001. When the operation was sold to Stena Line in April 2004, the ferry was renamed Envoy, laid up and later sold to Trond A Kittelsen Shipping A/S, Norway. They chartered her to Kystlink, for service on Langesund-Hirtshals route. She was sold to Kystlink in October 2004 and had her passenger capacity extended. The service ended in June 2005.

Several charters followed, seeing her on the Liverpool-Dublin service (P&O), and the Lübeck-Mukran-Saint Petersburg-Baltiysk-Lübeck circuit (Transrussia). In September 2005, Envoy was chartered to Nedlines for a new service between IJmuiden and Harwich.

In November 2006, she was sold to DFDS Lisco, who subsequently used her to cover for other vessels on various routes, whilst they were undergoing repairs and maintenance.

She was scrapped at Aliaga in January 2012.
