= MS Norwind =

Ferry

MS Norwind was a North Sea ferry that was later used in the Mediterranean Sea.

== History ==
The Norwind was the first ferry to sail on the Hull-Rotterdam route for North Sea Ferries in 1965.

On 17 December 1965, North Sea ferries started their inaugural ferry service. The ferries Norwave and Norwind sailed on their inaugural sailings from Hull to Rotterdam's Europoort. With Norwind a schedule was established that remains in place. P&O's interest was through its subsidiary General Steam Navigation Company, which had a 35 per cent stake in North Sea Ferries. With ships of 4,306 tons and 360 feet long, it was not the space for 249 passengers that was unusual it was the ships' capacity for trucks, trailers, coaches and cars. In 1965 54,000 passengers were carried.

Nine years later, demand was growing for North Sea ferries and two new ships, more than twice as large as before, Norland and Norstar were introduced on the Hull- Rotterdam route, replacing Norwind and Norwave. Before they were sold the decision was taken to transfer them to a new route, Hull-Zeebrugge. In 1974 they appeared on this route and therefore, again, starting another important service.

In 1987 after 22 years of service the new ferries Norsun and Norsea were introduced on the Hull-Rotterdam route. They replaced Norland and Norstar, moving them down to Hull-Zeebrugge. Norwind and Norwave left UK waters for the Mediterranean that year.

Heavily rebuilt, Norwind was sold to Ventouris and renamed Grecia Express. She was deemed to be a total loss following sinking in 1993.
