= Pride of Hull =

Bahamas registered passenger and cargo roll-on/roll-off ship

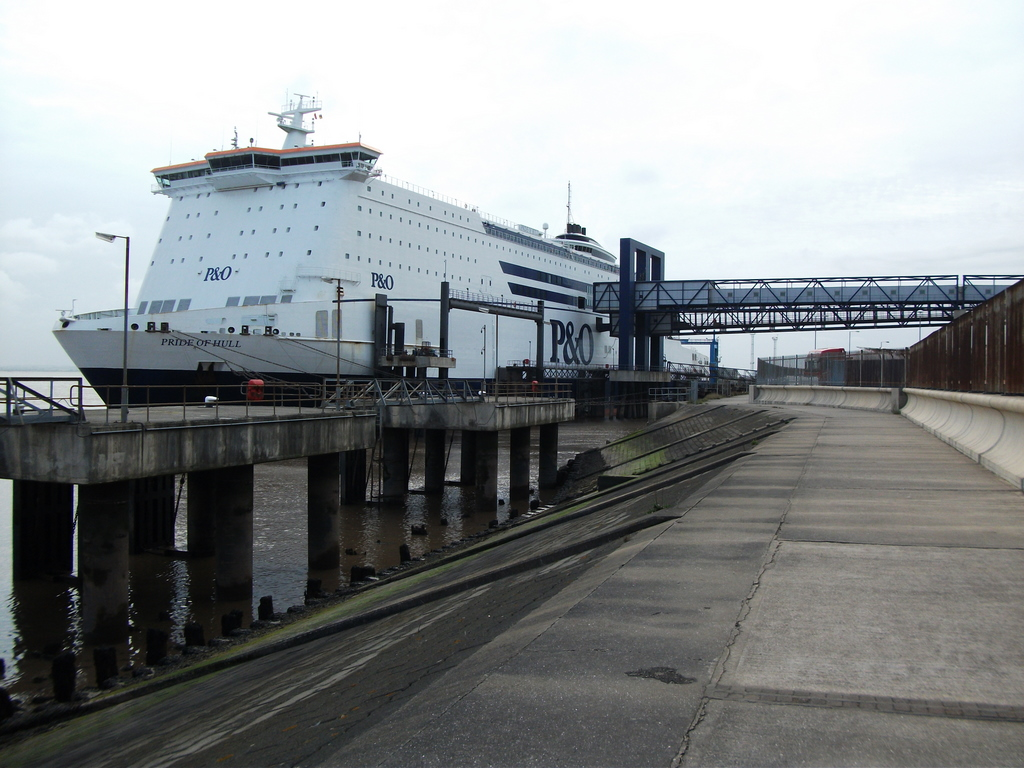
- The Pride of Hull

History
- Name: Pride of Hull
- Owner: P&O North Sea Ferries
- Operator: P&O Ferries
- Port of registry: Nassau, Bahamas
- Route: Hull–Rotterdam
- Ordered: 24 January 1999
- Builder: Fincantieri, Italy
- Yard number: 6066
- Launched: 11 April 2001
- Christened: 30 November 2001 by Cherie Blair
- Acquired: 16 November 2001
- In service: 2 December 2001
- Identification: IMO number: 9208629; MMSI number: 235249000; Callsign: ZNNK8
- Status: in active service

General characteristics
- Class & type: Ro-Ro cruiseferry
- Tonnage: 59,925 GT; 8,850 DWT
- Displacement: 25,113 long tons (25,516 t)
- Length: 215.44 m (706 ft 10 in)
- Beam: 31.85 m (104 ft 6 in)
- Draught: 6.04 m (19 ft 10 in)
- Decks: 12
- Propulsion: 4 × Wärtsilä 9L46C; 37,800 kW (50,700 hp) (combined)
- Speed: 22 knots (41 km/h; 25 mph)
- Capacity: 1,360 passengers; 530 cabins (incl. 6 suites, 9 deluxe, 5 family and 6 disabled cabins); 250 vehicles

Pride of Hull is a Bahamas registered passenger and cargo roll-on/roll-off cruiseferry in service with P&O North Sea Ferries on the Hull – Rotterdam route.

== Design ==
Pride of Hull was designed as two ships in one, both a car ferry and a cargo transporter, with three large freight decks, loaded by a single stern door and a car deck, on deck 7, loaded via a side ramp. She is 215.05 m (705 ft 7 in) long with a beam of 31.85 m (104 ft 6 in) and a draught of 6.04 m (19 ft 10 in). She is powered by four Wärtsilä 9L46C diesel engines which have a total power output of 37,800 kilowatts (50,700 hp) which can propel her at 22 knots (41 km/h). She has two bow thrusters, two stabilisers and twin rudders. With Mampaey quick release disc type towing hook.

== Service ==
Pride of Hull was originally ordered as Pride of Rotterdam, along with a sister ship Pride of Hull on 24 January 1999 from Fincantieri, Italy to replace the aging Norsea and Norsun which had been operating the Hull – Rotterdam route since 1987. On 11 March 2001, Norstar suffered a major engine room fire and was subsequently withdrawn from service upon arrival at Zeebrugge. As a result of this, the Norsun was required to go into refit early for subsequent transfer to the Kingston upon Hull – Zeebrugge as had been planned. The Hull – Rotterdam route operated with one British and one Dutch crew, the Dutch crew being assigned to Pride of Rotterdam and the British to Pride of Hull, as a result, in March 2001, with Pride of Hull having already been completed the names of the two vessels were swapped so that she could enter service as Pride of Rotterdam with the Dutch crew.

The newly renamed Pride of Hull was launched on 11 April 2001, finally being delivered to P&O Ferries on 16 November 2001. She was christened by Cherie Blair in Hull on 30 November 2001, entering service on 2 December 2001. Upon entering service she was the joint title holder of the World's Largest Cruiseferry with her sister, the Pride of Rotterdam

On 17 March 2022, P&O announced they were to fire 800 seafaring employees, including the entirety of the Pride of Hull’s crew, in a bid to save costs. In protest, the ship's crew refused to leave, and Captain Eugene Favier raised the gangplank and refused access to P&O's security, who were sent to forcefully remove the crew should they fail to leave the vessel. The standoff ended after five hours, when Captain Favier held discussions with P&O bosses, who agreed to provide the relevant documents to the crew, as requested by the National Union of Rail, Maritime and Transport Workers.

== Engine room fires ==
On 10 December 2008, Pride of Hull suffered a minor engine room fire whilst en route to Kingston upon Hull.

Another engine room fire broke out on 20 October 2020, this time en route to Rotterdam.

== Sister ships ==
Pride of Hull has one sister ship:

- Pride of Rotterdam

Preceded by Silja Europa	World's Largest Cruiseferry; 2001–2004; With: Pride of Rotterdam (2001–2004)	Succeeded by Color Fantasy
