= Van der Giessen de Noord =

Dutch shipbuilding company from 1820 to 2003

Coordinates: 51.8015°N 4.8910°E

Van der Giessen de Noord NV
- Type: Naamloze vennootschap
- Industry: Shipbuilding
- Founded: 1820
- Defunct: 2003
- Fate: Dissolved
- Headquarters: Krimpen aan den IJssel, Netherlands
- Website: www.gn.nl

Van der Giessen de Noord (Dutch pronunciation: [vɑn dər ˈɣisə(n) də ˈnoːrt]) was a shipbuilding company that mainly built ferries, located in Krimpen aan den IJssel, a town in the western Netherlands. The yard was especially suited to the construction of large vessels due to its developed undercover facilities.

The shipyard was founded in 1820. After World War II, the company expanded significantly in the building of larger ships. Owned by IHC Caland (now SBM Offshore), the yard went into liquidation in October 2003 primarily due to aggressive competition from other parts of the world such as South Korea. It had not received any orders for new vessels since 2000.

== Deliveries ==
Yard No	Image	Year Built	Current Name	Current Operator
758		1951	Hilma Hooker	Sunk in 1984
935		1986	GNV Blu	Grandi Navi Veloci
941		1989	Friesland	Rederij Doeksen
		1991	CS Sovereign	Global Marine
957		1993	Dénia Ciutat Creativa (ex Scandola)	Baleària
958		1993	Via Adriatico	Tirrenia
959		1993	Galileusz	Unity Line
961		1993	Norbank	P&O Ferries
962		1994	Norbay	P&O Ferries
963		1995	Kaitaki	Interislander
965		1995	Bang Chui Dao	China Shipping Group
966		1995	Hai Yang Dao	China Shipping Group
967		1996	Stena Jutlandica (III)	Stena Line
968		1997	Isle of Inishmore	Irish Ferries
969		1997	Schleswig-Holstein	Scandlines
970		1997	Deutschland	Scandlines
971		1998	Ben-my-Chree	Isle of Man Steam Packet Company
975		1999	Commodore Clipper	Brittany Ferries
976	Sail Away (51292495631)	2000	Blue Star 1	Blue Star Ferries
978		2000	Blue Star 2	Blue Star Ferries
985		2002	Mont St Michel	Brittany Ferries
988		2003	Pascal Paoli	SNCM Ferryterranée
