= MV Norstar =

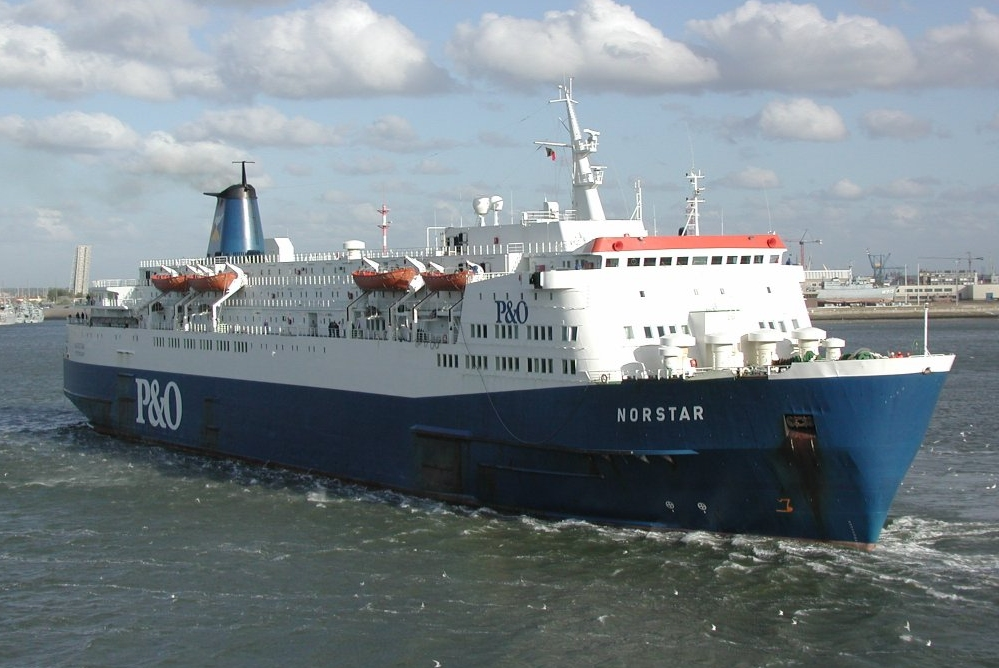
- Norstar at Zeebrugge, May 2001

History
- Name: Norstar
- Owner: Nedlloyd
- Port of registry: Rotterdam, Netherlands
- Yard number: 973
- Launched: 5 July 1974
- In service: 1974
- Out of service: 1996
- Identification: IMO number: 7360710
- Name: Norstar
- Owner: P&O North Sea Ferries
- Operator: P&O North Sea Ferries
- Acquired: 1996
- Out of service: 2001
- Fate: Sold
- Name: SNAV Campania
- Owner: SNAV Aliscafo
- Operator: SNAV
- Port of registry: Naples, Italy
- Route: Naples-Palermo
- Acquired: 2001
- Fate: Broken up in 2010

General characteristics
- Class & type: RORO
- Tonnage: 12,502 GRT
- Length: 152.77 m (501.2 ft)

General characteristics after 1987 lengthening
- Tonnage: 26,919 GRT
- Length: 173.29 m (568.5 ft)
- Beam: 25.2 m (83 ft)
- Draft: 6.02 m (19.8 ft)
- Propulsion: Two SWD 16TM410
- Speed: 19 knots (35 km/h)
- Notes: otherwise the same as built

MV Norstar was a roll-on/roll-off ferry operating between Kingston upon Hull in the East Riding of Yorkshire, England and Rotterdam Europoort, Netherlands and later on the Hull-Zeebrugge, Belgium route.

== History ==
The 27,000 gross ton ferry was built in 1974 by AG Weser, Bremerhaven for Dutch North Sea Ferries partners Noordzee Veerdiensten. Norstar sailed under the Dutch flag with (mainly) Dutch crew, while sistership Norland sailed under the British flag. The ship transferred to P&O North Sea Ferries in 1996.

On the UK side ferries needed to pass locks to berth in King George Dock, and both ships Norstar and Norland were designed as large as possible for the locks in 1974. From launch until 1987 she sailed the Hull-Rotterdam route and from 1987 until 2001 she sailed on the Hull-Zeebrugge route.

Norstar and Norland were replaced by Norsea and Norsun in 1987 on the Rotterdam route. Both ships were stretched and modernized by the original builder before entering service on the Zeebrugge route. The maximum dimensions to pass the locks allowed larger new ships for the Rotterdam route and also permitted the enlarging in 1987. An extra 20.25 metres was added in 1987, resulting in a length of 173.29 meters, 25.2 metres wide and a gross tonnage of 26,916 gross tons.

In March 2000 Norstar suffered a major engine fire.

Norstar was sold to SNAV in Italy (along with sister ship Norland) in 2001, for service between Naples and Palermo as SNAV Campania.

In 1987, Norstar was used for filming The Beiderbecke Tapes.

Norstar and her sister ship Norland were broken up at Alang, India in the summer of 2010.
