= MV Norland =

Roll-on/roll-off ferry (1974–2010)

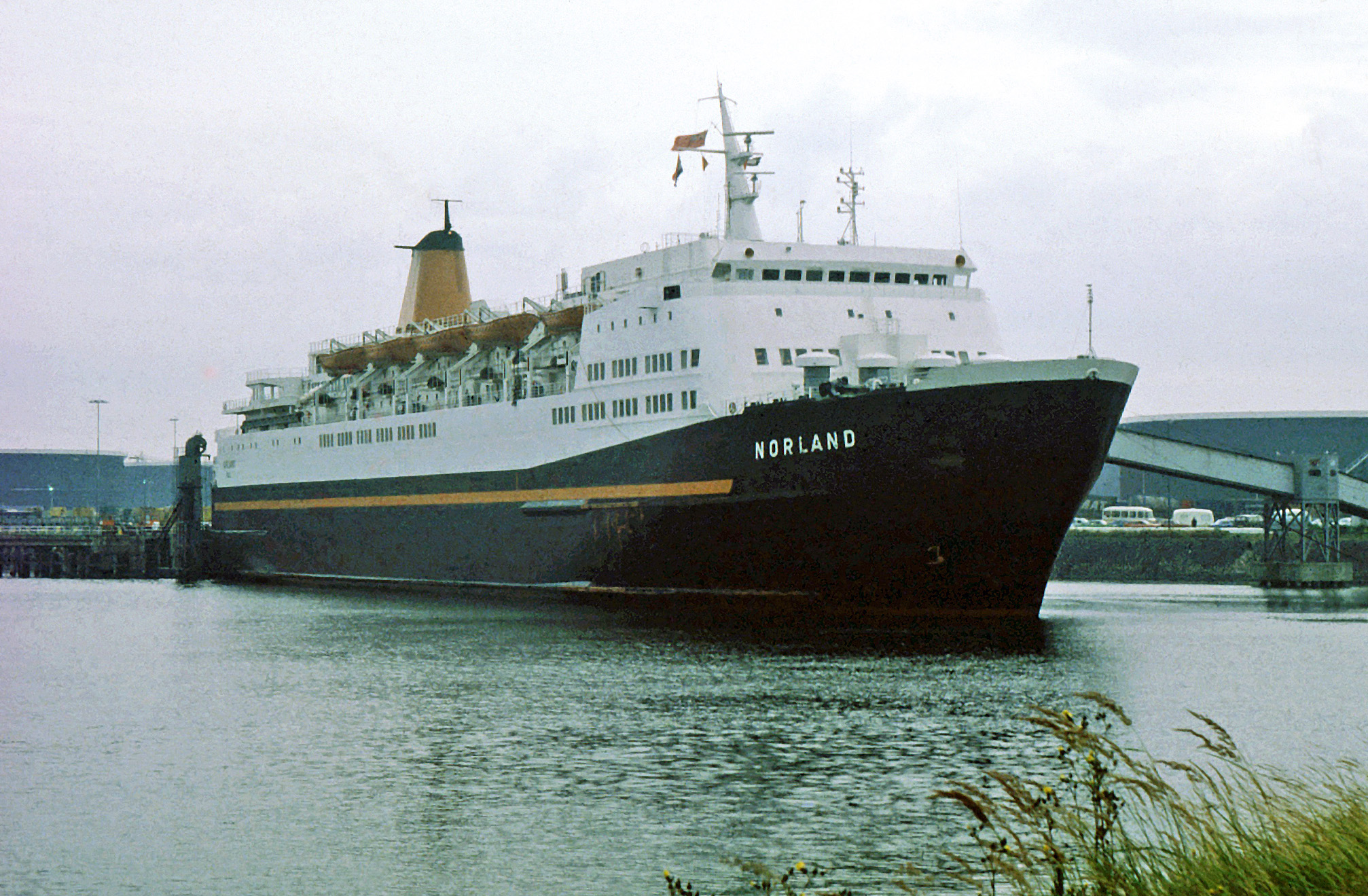
- Norland in Rotterdam in 1979

History
- Name: Norland (1974–2002); SNAV Sicilia (2002–2010)
- Owner: North Sea Ferries (1974–1996); P&O North Sea Ferries (1996–2002); SNAV Aliscafo (2002–2010)
- Operator: North Sea Ferries (1974–1996); P&O North Sea Ferries (1996–2002); SNAV (2002–2010)
- Port of registry: Hull, UK (1974–2006); Madeira, Portugal (2006–2007); Naples, Italy (2007–2010)
- Yard number: 972
- Launched: 13 October 1973
- In service: 1974
- Out of service: 2010
- Identification: IMO number: 7333822
- Honours and awards: Falkland Islands, 1982
- Fate: Scrapped 2010

General characteristics
- Type: Roll-on/roll-off
- Tonnage: 12,988 GRT
- Length: 152.77 m (501.2 ft)

General characteristics after 1987 lengthening
- Tonnage: 26,290 GT
- Length: 173.29 m (568 ft 6 in)
- Beam: 25.2 m (82 ft 8 in)
- Draft: 6.02 m (19 ft 9 in)
- Propulsion: Two SWD 16TM410
- Speed: 19 knots (35 km/h)
- Notes: otherwise the same as built

Norland was a roll-on/roll-off ferry operating between Kingston upon Hull in Yorkshire, England, and Rotterdam Europoort, Netherlands, and then Zeebrugge, Belgium. The 27,000 tonne ferry was built in 1974 by AG Weser, Bremerhaven, for Dutch North Sea Ferries partners Noordzee Veerdiensten. Norland sailed under the British flag with (mainly) British crew, while sistership MV Norstar sailed under the Dutch flag. The ship transferred to P&O North Sea Ferries in 1996.

== Falklands service ==
During the Falklands War, the Ministry of Defence requisitioned the Norland to be used as a troopship in the Task Force sent to retake the Falkland Islands from Argentina. Norland was among the ships to enter San Carlos Water during the amphibious landings of Commandos and Paratroopers, Captained by Donald Ellerby CBE. The ship survived attack from the Argentine Air Force, and at the end of the war repatriated the defeated Argentine troops back home, alongside the Canberra. For this service Norland received the battle honour "Falkland Islands 1982," which for many years was displayed in one of the passenger lounges, with a painting of the ship in San Carlos Water.

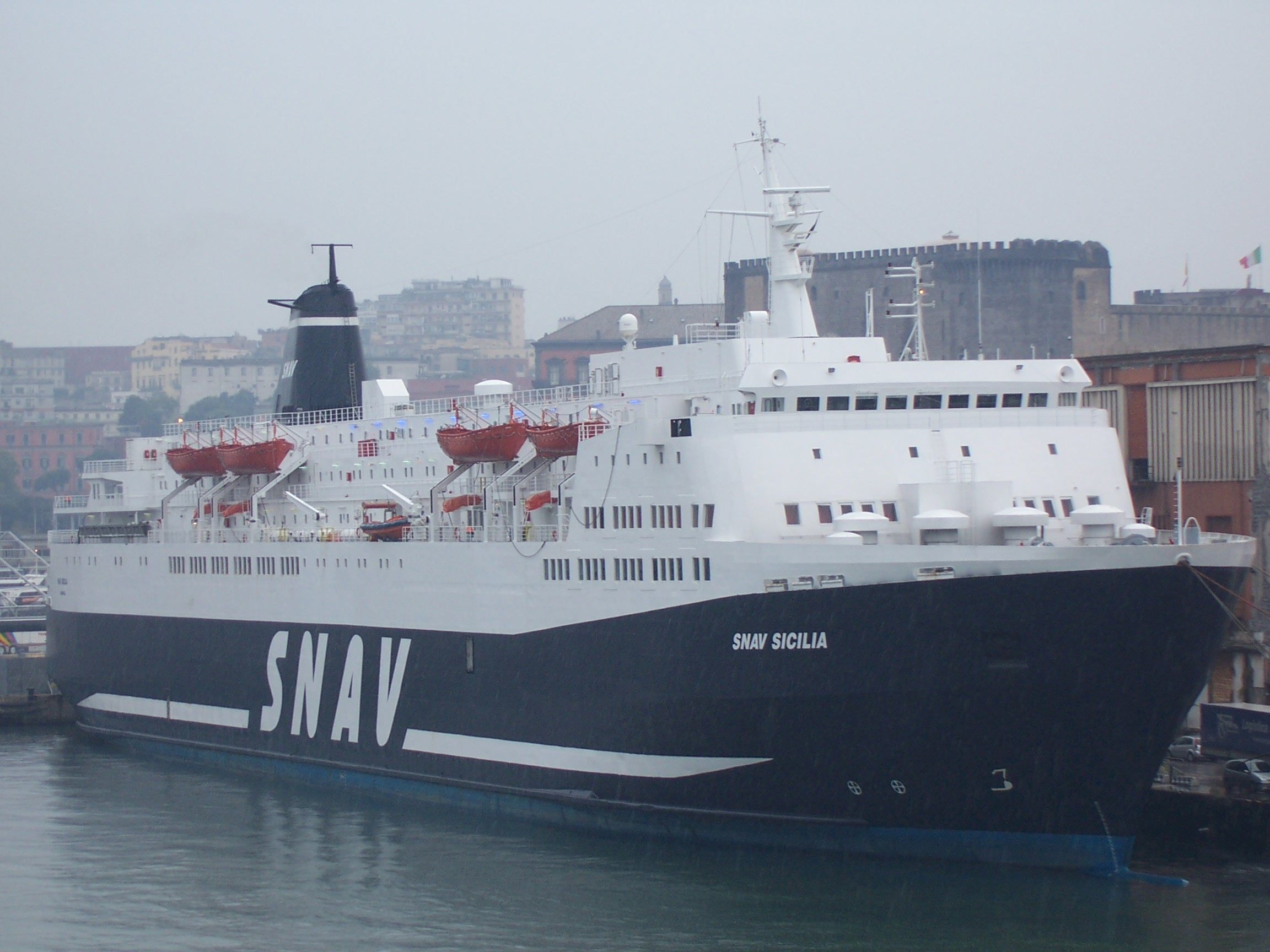
SNAV Sicilia

== Post P&O ==
In 2002, the Norland was sold to SNAV as the SNAV Sicilia for service between Naples and Palermo.

The ship was broken up in Alang, India in October 2010.

== Popular culture ==
She was seen in the BBC TV Only Fools and Horses episode "To Hull and Back", when the Trotter family used her as a means of navigation.
