= Krimpen aan den IJssel =

- Town and municipality
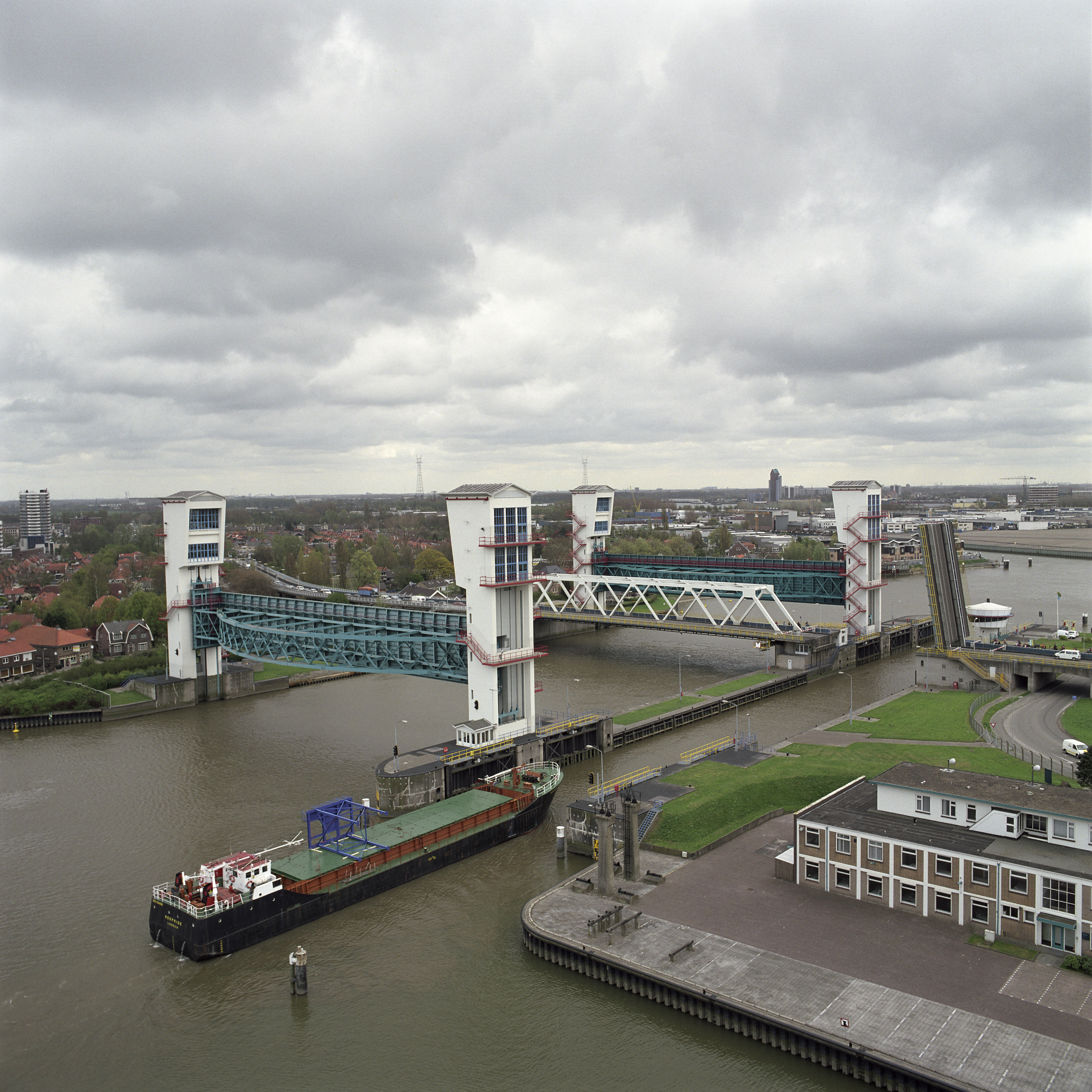
- Flood barrier in the Hollandse IJssel

- Flag Coat of arms Logo

- Location in South Holland
- Coordinates: 51°55′N 4°35′E
- Country: Netherlands
- Province: South Holland

Government
  - Body: Municipal council
  - Mayor: Harriët Westerdijk (CDA)

Area
  - Total: 8.95 km^{2} (3.46 sq mi)
  - Land: 7.69 km^{2} (2.97 sq mi)
  - Water: 1.26 km^{2} (0.49 sq mi)
- Elevation: −1 m (−3.3 ft)

Population (January 2021)
  - Total: 29,410
  - Density: 3,824/km^{2} (9,900/sq mi)
- Demonym: Krimpenaar
- Time zone: UTC+1 (CET)
  - Summer (DST): UTC+2 (CEST)
- Postcode: 2920–2926
- Area code: 0180
- Website: www.krimpenaandenijssel.nl
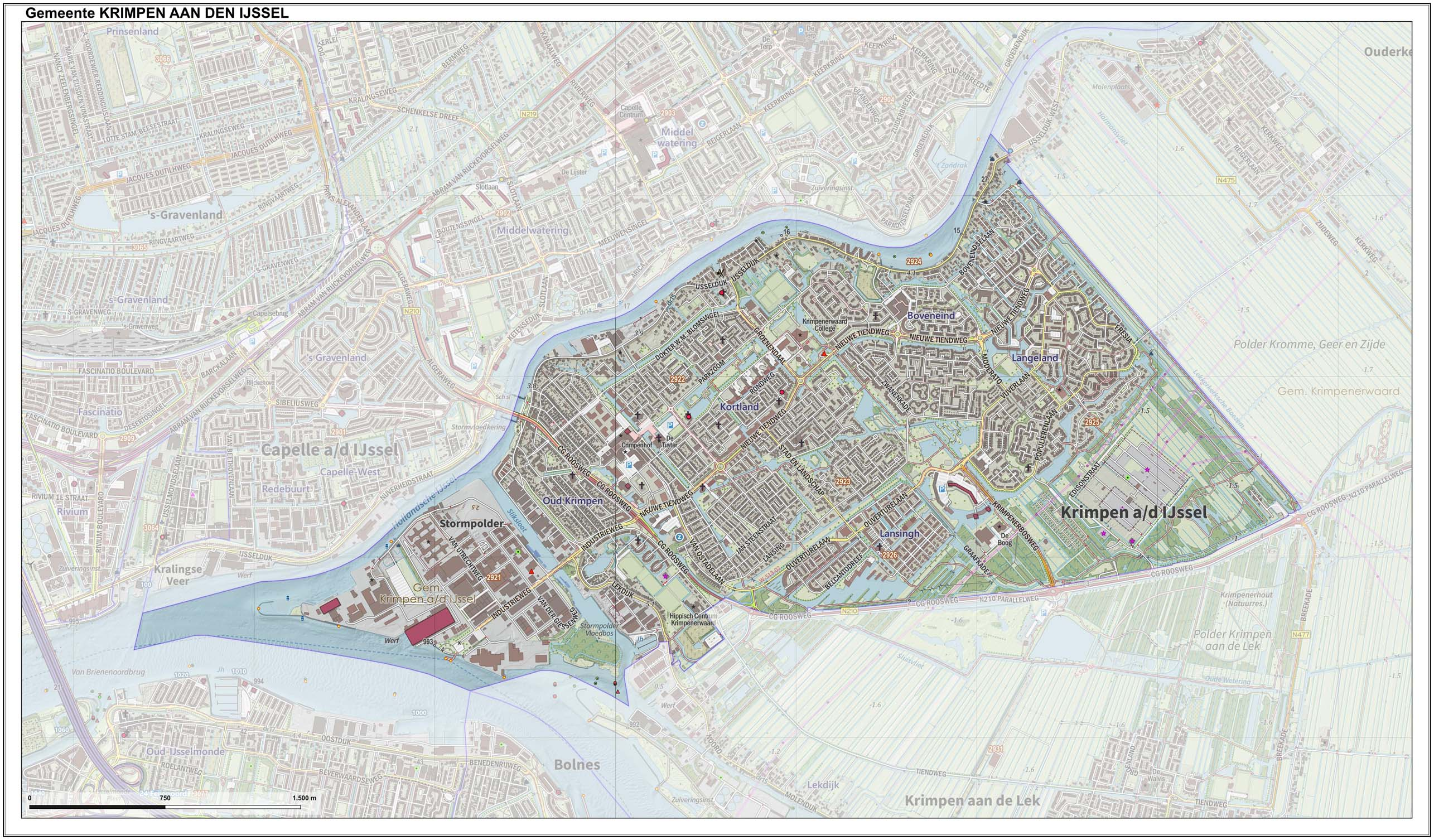
- Topographic map of the municipality of Krimpen aan den IJssel, June 2015

Krimpen aan den IJssel (Dutch pronunciation: [ˈkrɪmpə(n) aːn də(n) ˈɛisəl]) is a town and municipality in the western Netherlands, in the province of South Holland. The municipality had a population of 29,410 in 2021, and covers an area of 8.95 km^{2} (3.46 sq mi) of which 1.26 km^{2} (0.49 sq mi) is water.

== History ==
Krimpen is first mentioned in a document from 1277. Like other hamlets, many different spellings of its name have occurred over time, among which the name Tingenijssel deviated the most from today's spelling. The municipality is on the south shore of the river Hollandse IJssel. For many centuries, the only buildings in Krimpen were farm houses built along the river dike. They formed more or less autonomous communities along the dike.

Before the 20th century, the two principal industrial employers were the brick factory Mijnlieff and the shipyard Van der Giessen de Noord.

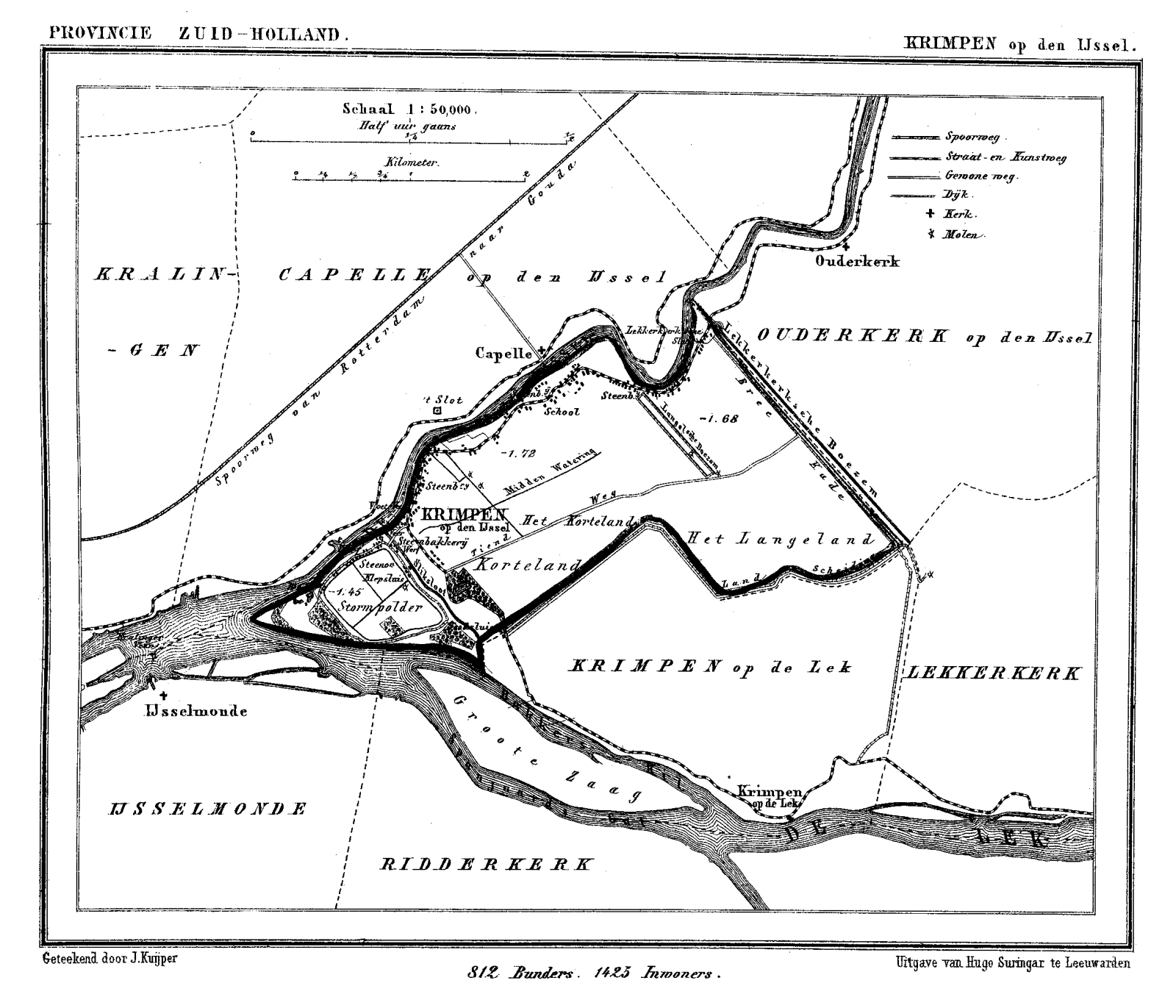
Krimpen aan den IJssel in 1867.

In the beginning of the 20th century development began inland from the river dikes, and the municipality began to lose its agricultural character.

During the North Sea flood of 1953, the tidal barrier in the river IJssel proved to be inadequate. So in 1954 construction started on a new storm surge barrier, the first installation of the Delta Works. In 1958 it was completed together with the Algera Bridge which connects Krimpen with Capelle aan den IJssel.

In the mid 1960s, Krimpen became a commuter town for people working in Rotterdam, resulting in major expansion. Today most of the municipality has been built up, except for the Krimpenerwaard where the town council aims to retain the rural character.

== Public transport ==
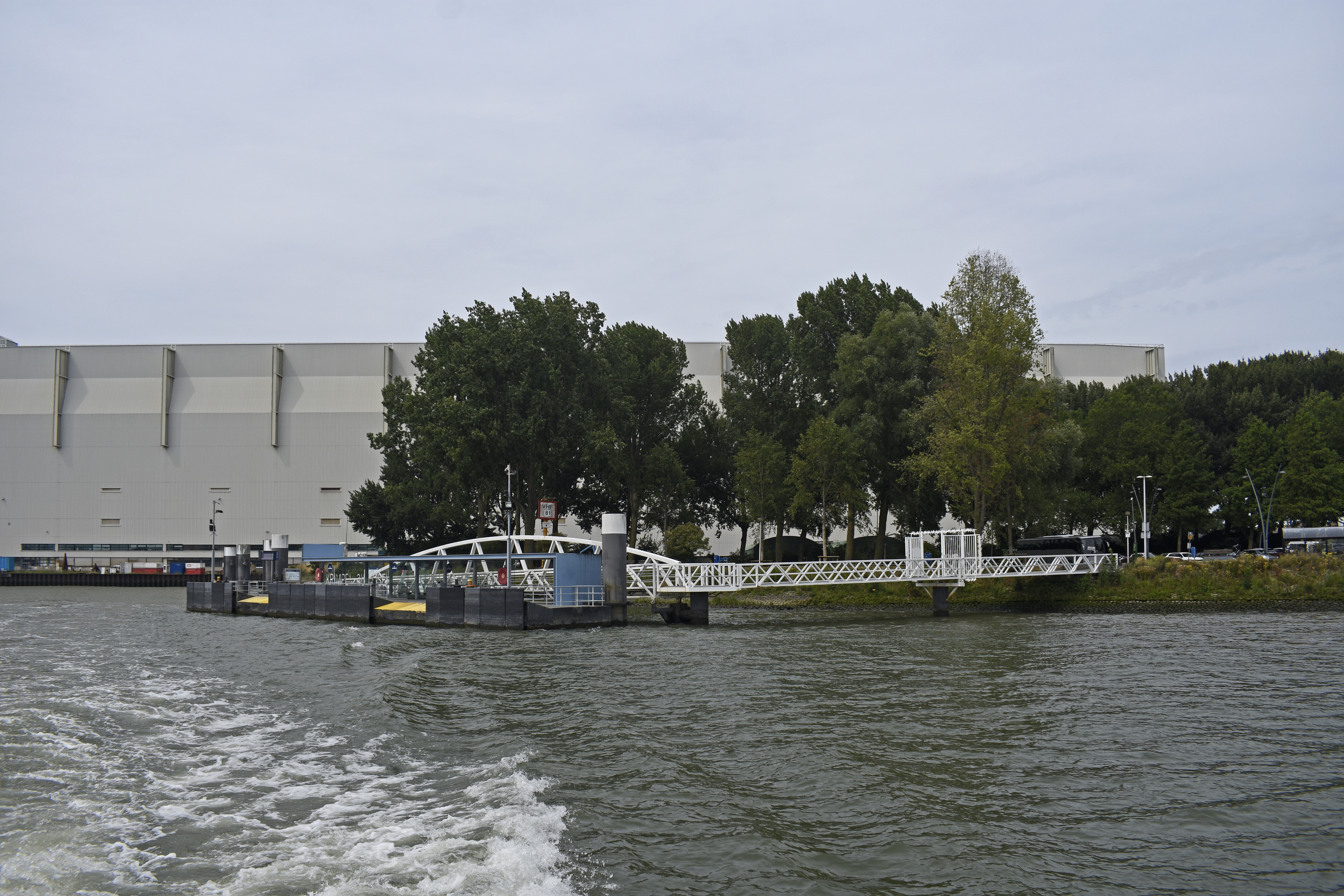
Waterbus stop Krimpen aan den IJssel Stormpolder

- Waterbus route 20:
  - Rotterdam Willemskade - Krimpen aan den IJssel Stormpolder - Ridderkerk De Schans - Alblasserdam Kade - Dordrecht Merwekade.

== Sister cities ==
Krimpen aan den Ijssel is twinned with:

- Kiskőrös, Hungary

== Notable people ==
- Gerard van Walsum (1900–1980), politician (mayor of Delft and Rotterdam)
- Piet Jan van der Giessen (1918–1993), sailor, competed at the 1952 Summer Olympics
- Michiel van Lambalgen (born 1954), professor of Logic and Cognitive Science at the University of Amsterdam
- Hans van Baalen (1960–2021), politician
- Rik Grashoff (born 1961), engineer and politician (alderman of Delft and Rotterdam)
- Bart van den Berg (born 1993), tennis player

–
