= Pride of Rotterdam =

Dutch cruiseferry

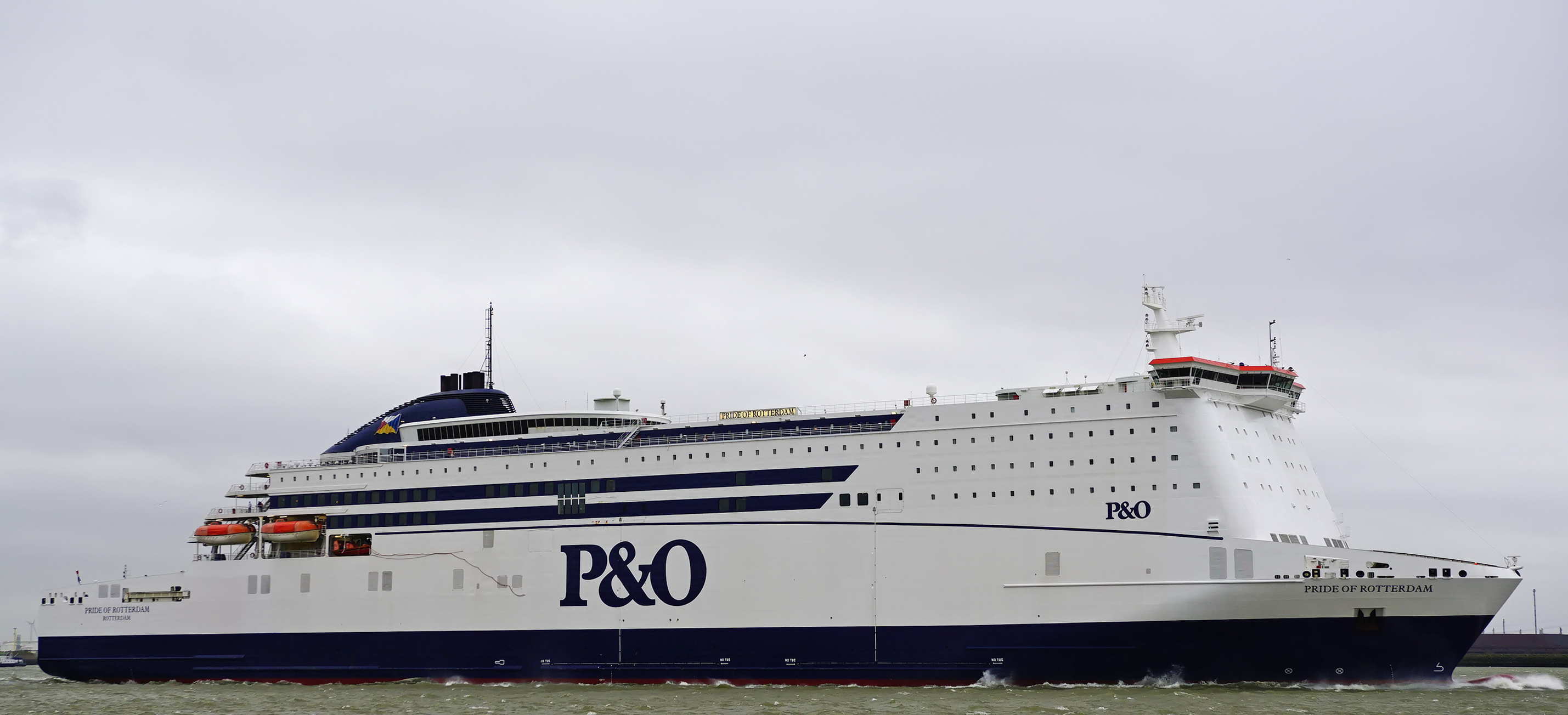
- Pride of Rotterdam

History
- Name: Pride of Rotterdam
- Operator: P&O Ferries
- Port of registry: Rotterdam (Netherlands)
- Route: Hull–Rotterdam
- Builder: Fincantieri, Italy
- Yard number: 6065
- Laid down: 1 March 1999
- Launched: 29 September 2000
- Christened: 20 April 2001
- Acquired: 12 April 2001
- Maiden voyage: 20 April 2001
- Identification: IMO number: 9208617; MMSI Number 244980000; Callsign PBAJ
- Status: in active service

General characteristics
- Class & type: Ro-Ro cruiseferry
- Tonnage: 59,925 GT; 10,100 DWT
- Displacement: 25,113 long tons (25,516 t)
- Length: 215.44 m (706 ft 10 in)
- Beam: 31.85 m (104 ft 6 in)
- Draught: 6.04 m (19 ft 10 in)
- Decks: 12
- Propulsion: 4 × Wärtsilä 9L46C engines, 37,800 kW (50,700 hp)
- Speed: 22 knots (41 km/h; 25 mph)
- Capacity: 1,360 passengers; 530 cabins (incl. 6 suites, 9 deluxe, 5 family and 6 disabled cabins); 250 vehicles

Pride of Rotterdam is a Dutch registered passenger and cargo roll-on/roll-off ship/cruiseferry, in service with P&O North Sea Ferries on the Hull - Rotterdam route.

== Description ==
Pride of Rotterdam is 215.05 m (705 ft 7 in) long with a beam of 31.85 m (104 ft 6 in) and a draught of 6.04 m (19 ft 10 in). She is powered by four Wärtsilä 9L46C diesel engines which have a total power output of 37,800 kilowatts (50,700 hp). These can propel her at 22 knots (41 km/h).

Pride of Rotterdam can carry 1,370 passengers. She has 3,300 metres (3,600 yd) of lane capacity, and can carry 250 cars and 400 trailers. Cars are driven in through an entrance in the ship's side and stored separately from trailers, which are loaded from the rear.

== History ==
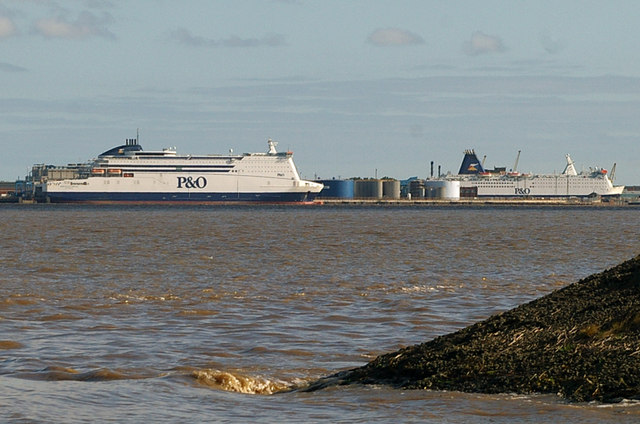
Pride of Rotterdam docked in Hull, to the right the Pride of Bruges can be seen.

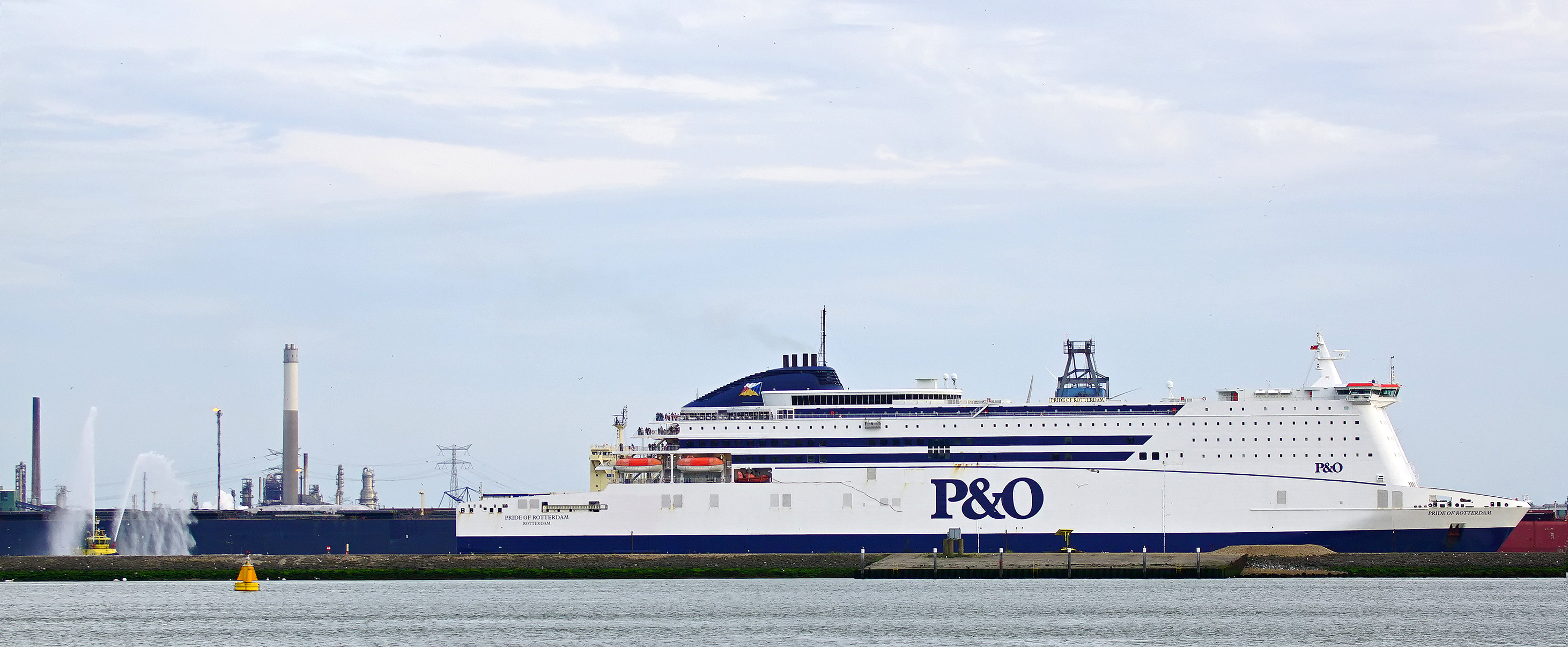
Pride of Rotterdam's passenger decks can be seen in this picture.

The ship's keel was laid on 1 March 1999. The ship was built as yard number 6065. She was originally to have been named Pride of Hull, but this was changed to Pride of Rotterdam before her launch on 29 September 2000. Pride of Rotterdam was officially handed over to P&O North Sea Ferries on 12 April 2001 in Venice, Italy. She was christened on 27 April 2001 by Queen Beatrix and entered service on 30 April 2001 on the Hull - Rotterdam route.

Pride of Rotterdam is owned by Hampton Shipping BV, managed by P&O North Sea Ferries and classed by Lloyd's Register. The ship has a capacity of 59,925 gross tonnage (GT) and 10,100 tons deadweight (DWT). She is allocated the IMO Number 9208617, MMSI Number 244980000 and uses the callsign PBAJ. Her port of registry is Rotterdam.

Both Pride of Rotterdam and Pride of Hull are too wide to pass through the lock at Hull. Associated British Ports built a new terminal at Hull to accommodate the passengers using these two ferries. The Rotterdam Terminal was built at a cost of £14,300,000.

On 21 November 2005, to celebrate the 40th anniversary of the introduction of the Hull - Rotterdam route, Pride of Rotterdam sailed from Rotterdam to Hull with the Dutch band BZN performing on board. The return sailing on 22 November also saw BZN performing. On 3 December 2008, a crew member was lost overboard in the North Sea off the east coast of the United Kingdom. A search was initiated involving eight lifeboats and helicopters from RAF Leconfield and Wattisham. The search was called off but the missing crew member was not found.

== Sister ships ==
Pride of Rotterdam has one sister ship:

- Pride of Hull

== See also ==
- Largest ferries of Europe

Preceded by Silja Europa	World's Largest Cruiseferry; 2001–2004; With: Pride of Hull (2001-2004)	Succeeded by Color Fantasy
