= Nedlloyd =

Dutch shipping company

- Industry: Shipping
- Founded: 1 June 1970
- Defunct: 27 June 1997
- Fate: Rebranded as P&O Nedlloyd
- Headquarters: Rotterdam, Netherlands
- Area served: Worldwide
- Services: Container transportation

Nedlloyd was a Dutch shipping company, formed in 1970 as the result of a merger of several shipping lines:

- Stoomvaart Maatschappij Nederland (SMN)
- Koninklijke Rotterdamsche Lloyd (KRL)
- Koninklijke Java-China-Paketvaart-Lijnen (KJCPL)
- Vereenigde Nederlandsche Scheepvaartmaatschappij (VNS)

The company used to bring these shipping companies together was the Nederlandsche Scheepvaart Unie (NSU), which dated from 1908. NSU was set up to defend SMN and KRL against foreign takeovers, particularly the British company Blue Funnel. Initially SMN, KRL and VNS were managed out of Rijswijk, while KJCPL remained a separate business unit run from their office in Hong Kong. In 1977 it was decided by the then management of B.E. Ruys, J.Groenendijk, E.A. van Walsum and A. van Putten to do away with the name NSU and rebrand all the business units into one Nedlloyd style. At the same time KJCPL (known in the Southern Hemisphere as Royal Interocean Lines) was to be also part of Nedlloyd Lines, as the shipping arm of the Nedlloyd Group was to be known.

Thus in 1977 NSU changed its name to Koninklijke Nedlloyd Groep N.V. ("Royal Nedlloyd Group"), and merged in 1981 with the KNSM Group N.V. In the 1990s the Nedlloyd Group faced tough competition and eventually had to find a partner for their container-liner business. For that reason Nedlloyd Lines formed a joint venture with P&O Containers to become P&O Nedlloyd. By then most of the other business units of the Nedlloyd Group had been sold off to generate cash, as well as ensuring equality with P&O Containers. Eventually P&O Nedlloyd, despite a reversed listing on the Amsterdam Bourse, was not able to fend off competition and was taken over by Maersk.

== History ==
=== Friendly rivalry: 1870–1945 ===
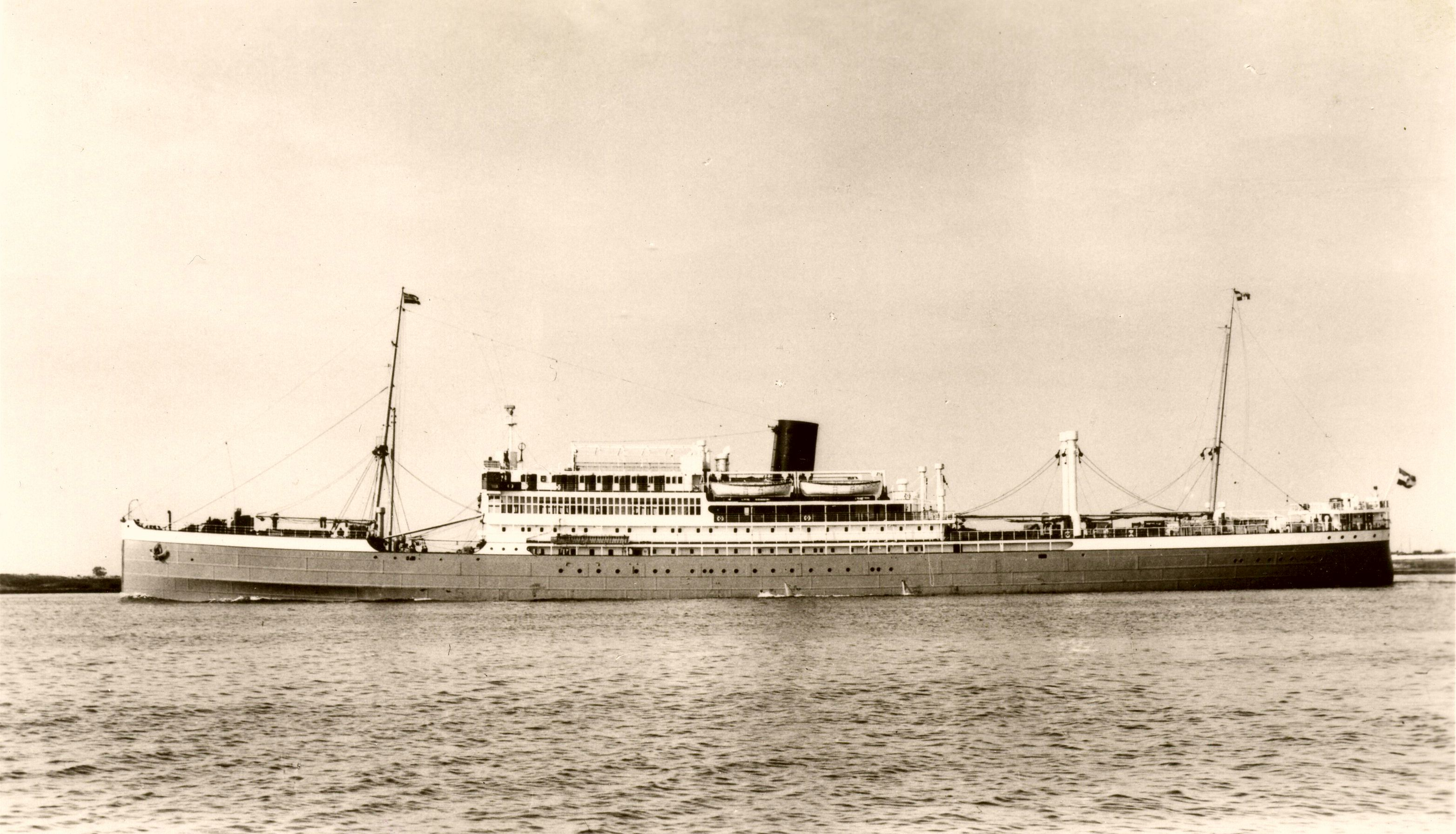
MS Indrapoera was completed in 1925 and was KRL's first diesel-powered passenger liner.

House flag of Nedlloyd

The Stoomvaart Maatschappij Nederland (SMN), otherwise known as the Netherland Line, was founded in Amsterdam in 1870, while the Koninklijke Rotterdamsche Lloyd (KRL) was founded in Rotterdam in 1875. In a long-lasting friendly rivalry, both shipping companies offered regular mail-ship services between the Netherlands and the Dutch East Indies, the Dutch colony in South East Asia now known as Indonesia.

Within the Dutch East Indies, inter-island services were provided by the Koninklijke Paketvaart-Maatschappij (KPM), founded in Amsterdam in 1888 and with the operational head office in Batavia, now known as Jakarta.

These shipping services to the Dutch East Indies were complemented by the Java-China Japan Lijn (JCJL), founded in Amsterdam in 1902 and with the operational head office in Hong Kong, where P.J. Roosegaarde Bisschop sterling work performed.

To ensure independence and to provide protection against involuntary take-overs by competitors, SMN, KRL and KPM formed a cartel under the name NV Nederlandsche Scheepvaart Unie in 1908, which also meant that the individual shipping companies were restricted to their agreed trading areas. Highlights of the pre-war developments were the introduction of passenger mail services sailing alternating from Amsterdam and Rotterdam via Suez and the Red Sea to Batavia, in addition to the regular freight services. The inter-island service with connections to Hong Kong was provided by the KPM and JCJL with passenger-mail vessels. Passenger vessels managed by KRL and SMN were eventually amongst others: Oranje, Johan van Oldenbarneveld, Indrapoera, Christiaan Huygens, Marnix van St. Aldegonde, and Johan de Wit. The well-known Willem Ruys was still under construction at the beginning of World War II at the shipyard in Vlissingen / Flushing and was flooded in the shipyard till 1945.

=== Toward closer ties: 1945–1970 ===
From 1948 onward the co-operation between KRL and SMN extended to other geographical areas under the acronym Nedlloyd Lines (NLL); their services to the Dutch East Indies resumed, along with those by KPM and JCJL. Following the birth of the State of Indonesia in 1949, and the subsequent loosening of the old colonial ties, trade with the former colonies declined. Some trade with Indonesia remained possible until 1960; thereafter Dutch vessels were no longer allowed to ply in Indonesian waters, resulting in the majority of the inter-island KPM fleet partly being laid up at Singapore. As a consequence KPM and JCJL came together and formed a company called Koninklijke Java-China Paketvaart Lijnen (KJCPL) in 1948. Since the Dutch name KJCPL was not ideal in English-speaking territories, the company adopted the name Royal Interocean Lines (RIL). A full merger between KPM and KJCPL only occurred in 1967.

Also in the post-WWII period, the Verenigde Nederlandse Scheepvaartmaatschappij (VNS) was formed and jointly owned by SMN, KRL, Holland Amerika Lijn, Van Ommeren and KNSM. In practice VNS operated under different names - Holland Africa Line (founded in 1934) with services covering Africa including in East Africa coastal feeder services, Holland Persian Gulf Line, Holland Pakistan/India Line, Holland Fareast Line, Holland Australia Line - emphasising the various trades.

The VNS was the experimental ground for improved integration and introduction of operational innovations, such as containers with the name “Kerklines” resulting in new operational systems with unit-loads on the Australia service and extending the routes of vessels with container holds to the Far East to meet the initial demand for container space.

=== Merger: 1970–1981 ===
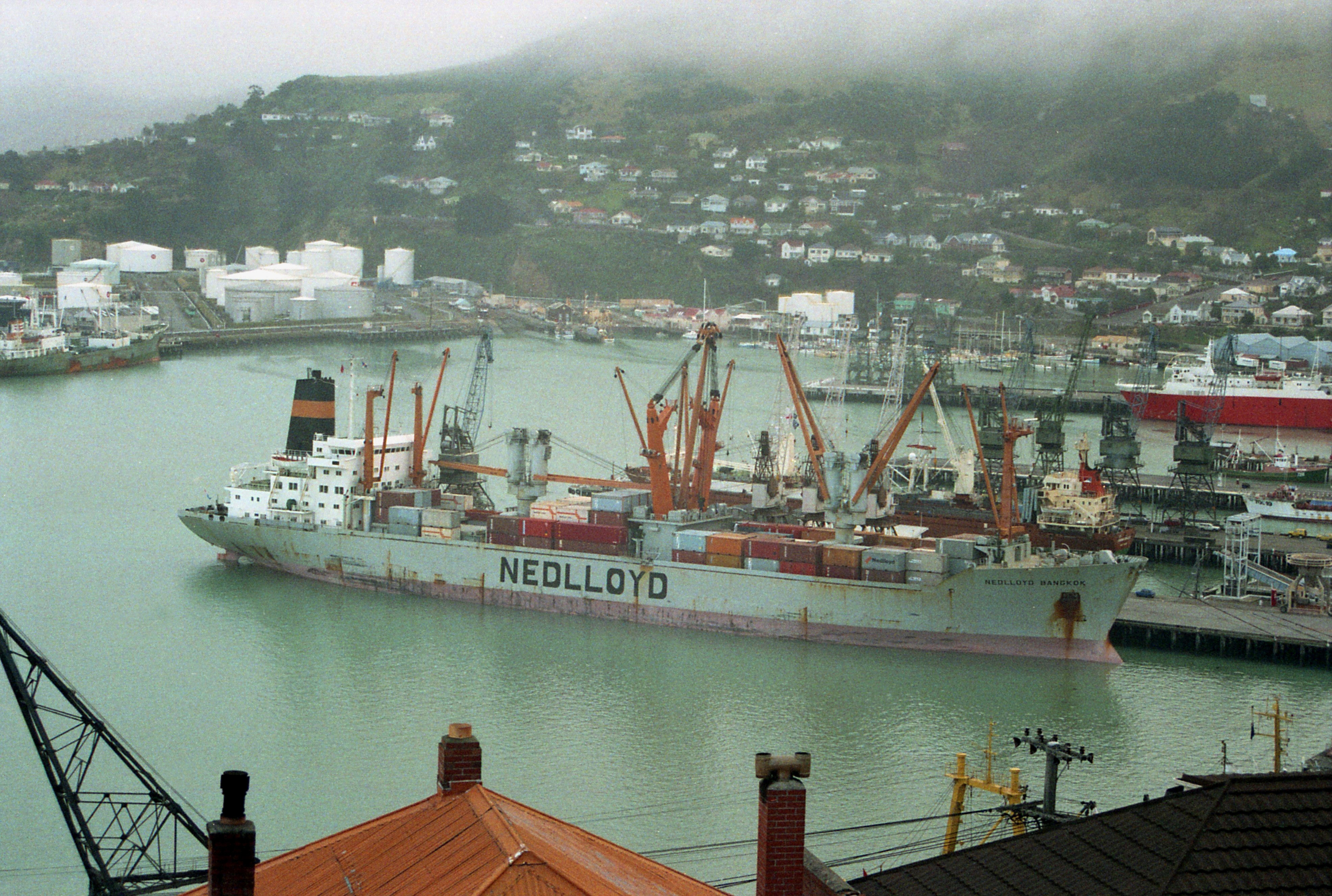
The Nedlloyd Bangkok at Lyttelton, New Zealand (1987)

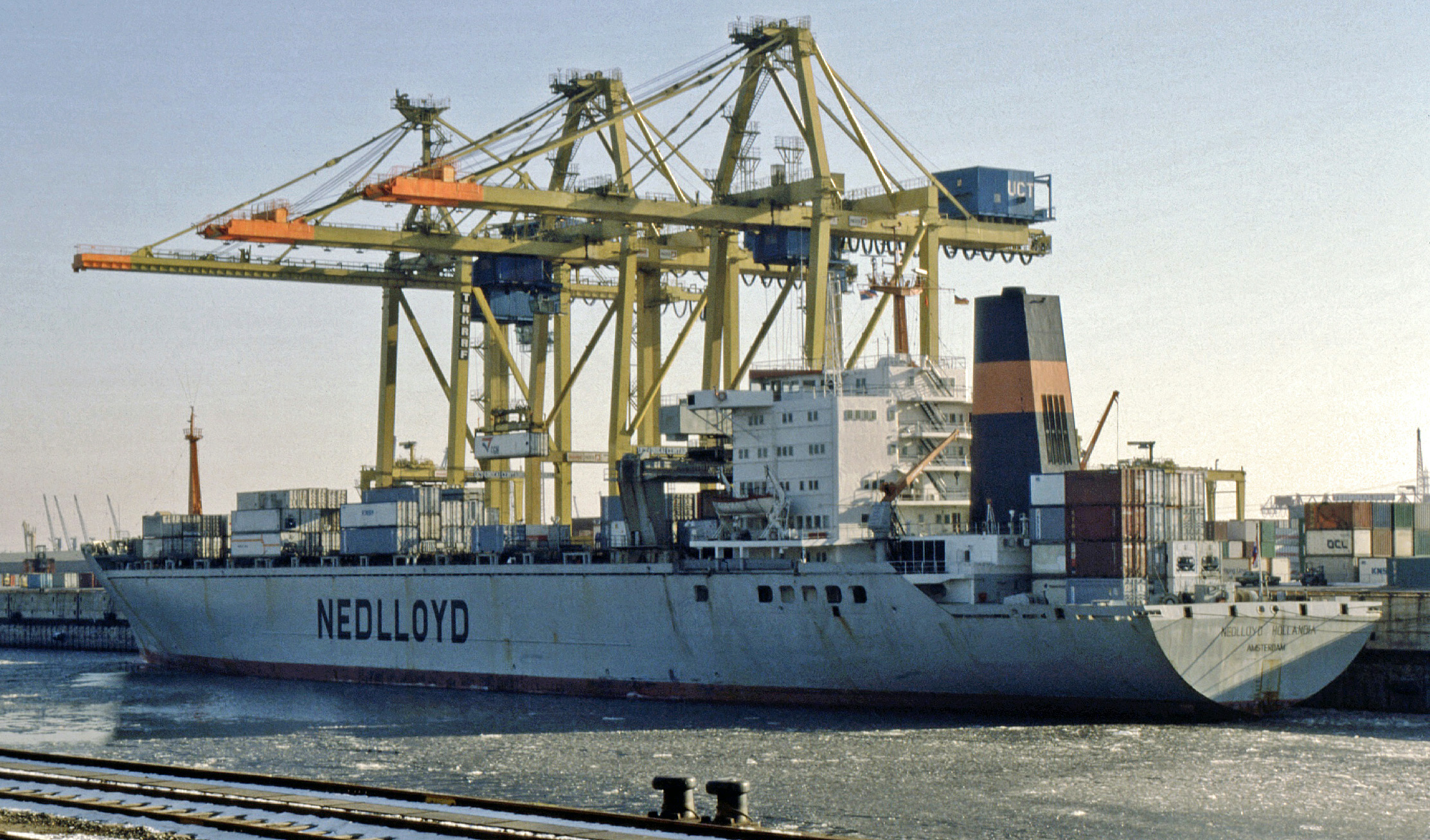
The Nedlloyd Hollandia in the port of Hamburg (1986)

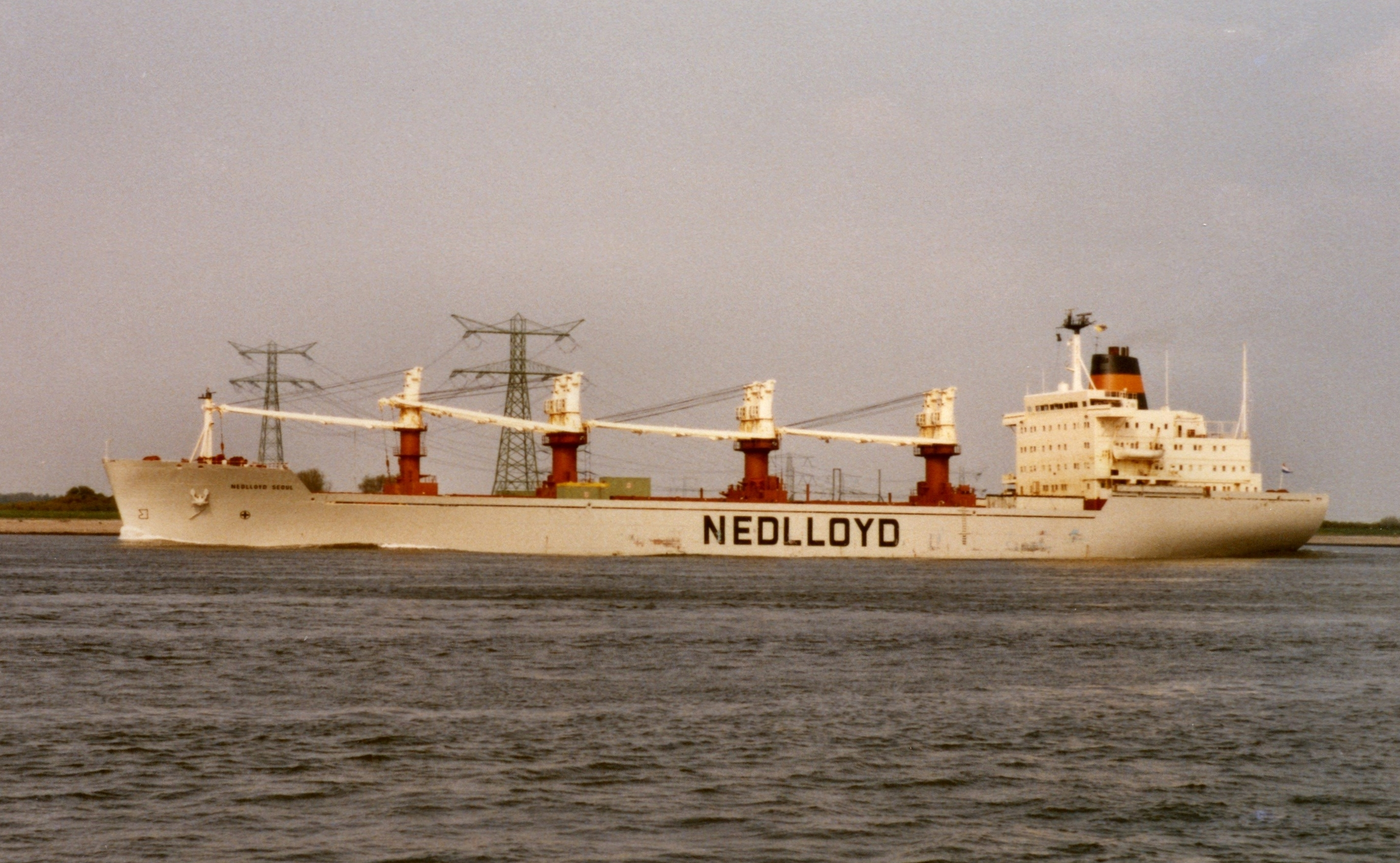
The Nedlloyd Seoul outbound on the Nieuwe Waterweg (1985)

The more traditional SMN, KRL and VNS were facing difficult times which resulted in a government-supervised analysis reviewing the situation in 1969. A proper feasibility study presented by Jan J. Oyevaar reviewed competitiveness, future outlook and financial forecast. The analysis recommended a merger between the major Dutch shipping companies which was established on June 15, 1970 with the N.V. Nederlandsche Scheepvaart Unie of 1908 becoming the holding company. See above. The KJCPL agreed to be also part of the new setup, but was still managed in the Far East since the Pacific Rim was their traditional and successful base.

The SMN, KRL and VNS parts of the new company, with a total seagoing fleet of 84 vessels, then traded under the name Koninklijke Nedlloyd. The KJCPL part of the company was kept outside the Nedlloyd scope, and remained a separate entity managed from Hong Kong with 53 seagoing vessels.

In 1977 the Nederlandsche Scheepvaart Unie N.V. holding company as a whole was renamed Koninklijke Nedlloyd Groep N.V. – Royal Nedlloyd Group.

In 1981 the Koninklijke Nederlandsche Stoomboot Maatschappij (KNSM), whose financial situation had deteriorated considerably, was taken over by Nedlloyd. Before then the KNSM was still optimistic about surviving in the trading areas of the Caribbean, Mediterranean and South America. For that reason KNSM had taken over a number of transportation businesses, including the Koninklijke Hollandsche Lloyd (founded in 1908), well known for its passenger vessels plying between Amsterdam and South America with mainly Eastern European emigrants after World War I.

=== Decline: 1981–2005 ===
Having concluded the giant merger which took about ten years, and with the total rationalisation of Nedlloyd's shipping activities, a separate problem surfaced – coping with strong-headed management and decades-old cultures. The diversity of the original shipping companies made it extremely difficult to form a coherent management.

In 1985 Nedlloyd initiated a diversification program and introduced a split in divisions, including non-shipping divisions such as the development of worldwide forwarding and parcel services basically connected to the shipping division – the early start of supply chain management. Overall the newly formed group had difficulty in identifying their own core activity, missed the real strategic views and over-expanded into non-core activities Nedlloyd did not fully understand.

The desperately required commercial views were overshadowed by a “cashier’s mentality” resulting in a hostile takeover attempt in the late 1980s by the Norwegian investor Torstein Hagen, aimed at steering back to the real shipping activities, leaving the Nedlloyd management panic stricken, digging in and manoeuvring into self-defensive tactics, with the help of shareholders meetings, without facing the real problems.

As from 1990 Nedlloyd was facing a financial disaster and was forced to cash in by selling most of its non-shipping assets, and for the first time in its long history, banks were dictating the rules and pulling the strings. The shipping group no longer owned the new buildings and lease plans were created to finance the new building program and save the group from insolvency.

In 1996, Nedlloyd Lines – the liner shipping division – merged with P&O Containers to become P&O Nedlloyd, which was in turn taken over in 2005 by Maersk. The Nedlloyd brand, with its roots in facilitating Dutch trading in a bygone colonial era, thereafter ceased to exist. The brand was retired in 2016.
