= Kaitaki =

Ferry in New Zealand

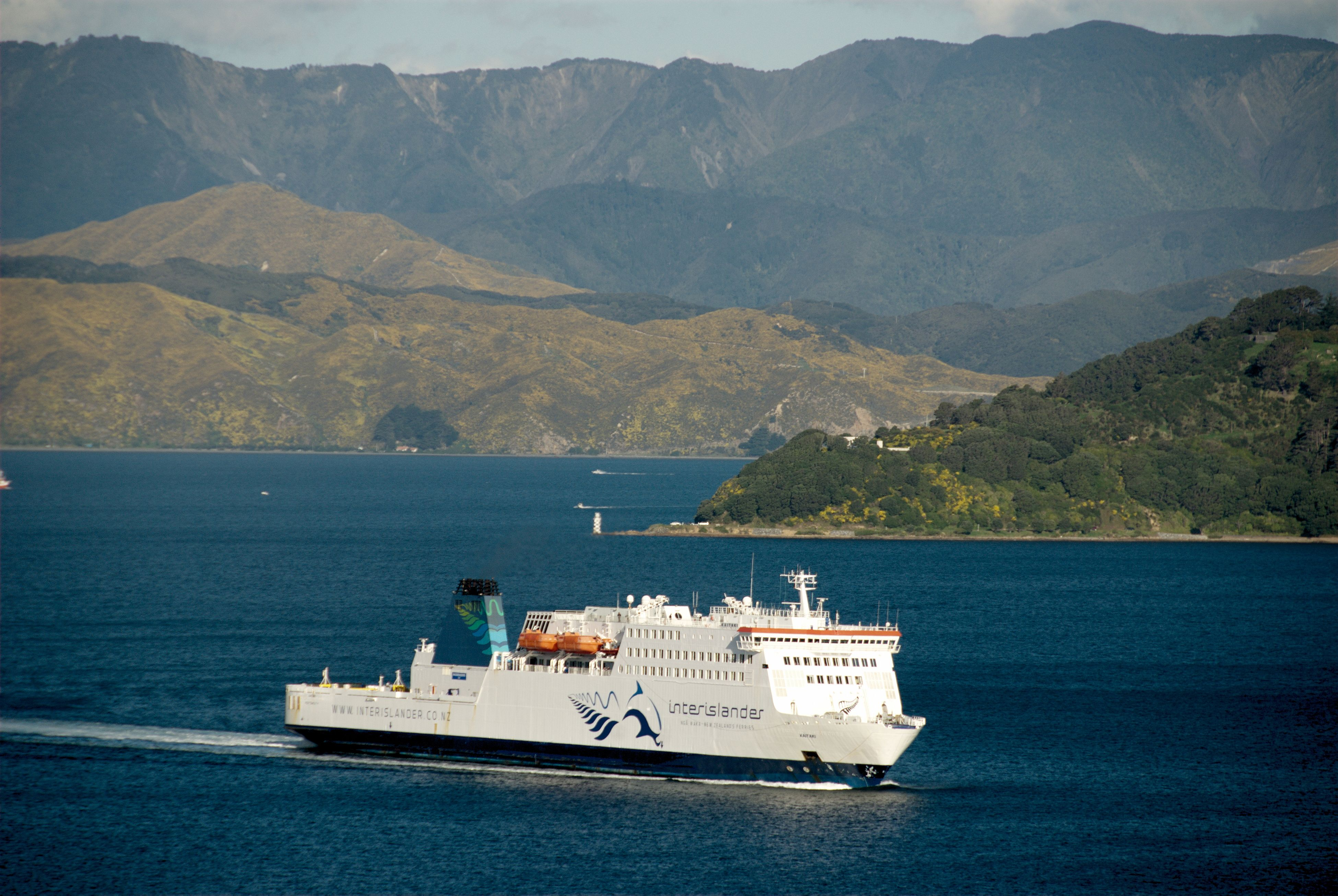
- Kaitaki in Wellington Harbour

History
- Name: 1995–2002: Isle of Innisfree; 2002–2005: Pride of Cherbourg; 2005: Stena Challenger; 2005–2007: Challenger; 2007 onwards: Kaitaki
- Owner: Irish Continental Group (1995–2017), KiwiRail (2017–)
- Operator: 1995–2001: Irish Ferries; 2002–2005: P&O Ferries; 2005: Stena Line; 2005 onwards: KiwiRail
- Port of registry: 1995–2002: Dublin, Ireland; 2002–17: Portsmouth, United Kingdom; 2017–present: Wellington, New Zealand
- Route: Wellington to Picton (from 2005)
- Builder: Van der Giessen de Noord, Rotterdam, Netherlands
- Yard number: 963
- Laid down: 3 August 1994
- Launched: 1 January 1995
- In service: 23 May 1995
- Identification: Call sign: ZMKI; IMO number: 9107942; MMSI number: 512445000
- Status: In service

General characteristics
- Type: Roll-on/roll-off ferry
- Tonnage: 22,365 GT; 5,794 DWT
- Length: 181.6 m (596 ft)
- Beam: 23.4 m (77 ft)
- Draught: 5.30 m (17 ft 5 in)
- Decks: 10
- Installed power: 4 x Sulzer Type 8 ZAL 40 S; 5,760 kW each at 510 rpm
- Propulsion: 2 propellers; 2 bow thrusters
- Speed: 20.5 knots (38.0 km/h; 23.6 mph)
- Capacity: 1,350 passengers; 132 passenger berths; 600 cars; 1,780 lane metres
- Crew: 60

Kaitaki is a roll-on/roll-off ferry built in 1995. It previously operated under the names, Isle of Innisfree, then Pride of Cherbourg, Stena Challenger and Challenger. As of 2008, Kaitaki was the largest ferry operating the Interislander service between the North and South Islands of New Zealand having taken her latest name in 2007. KiwiRail, the operator of the Interislander service, bought the Kaitaki in 2017.

== History ==
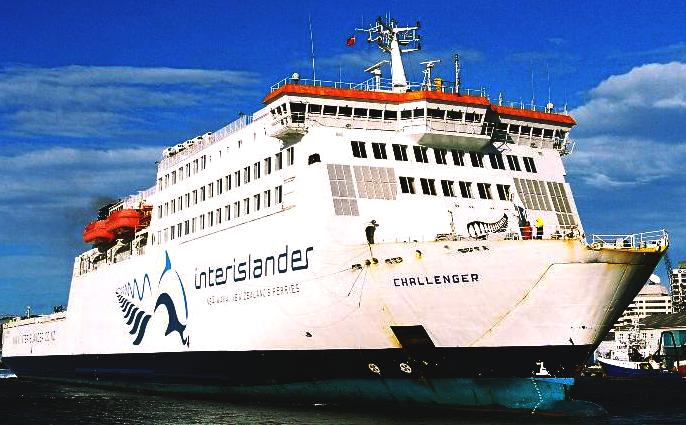
Kaitaki under her previous name Challenger in Wellington Harbour

The ship was built at Van der Giessen de Noord shipyard in the Netherlands, and was launched in 1995 as the Isle of Innisfree for the Irish Ferries route between Holyhead and Dublin. Subsequently she served on the Pembroke Dock – Rosslare route between 1997 and 2001.

In 2002 the Isle of Innisfree was chartered by P&O Ferries and was sent to Falmouth in July of that year for refit. She emerged as Pride of Cherbourg, the third ship to carry this name. Pride of Cherbourg entered service in September 2002.

Pride of Cherbourg's last crossing for P&O was on 14 January 2005, from Cherbourg to Portsmouth. P&O subchartered her to Stena Roro and she sailed for Gdańsk, where all her exterior P&O branding was removed and she was renamed Stena Challenger. The Stena Challenger sailed on Stena Line's Karlskrona—Gdynia service from February until June 2005.

After completing her service with Stena Line she was sub-chartered again, to KiwiRail. Before leaving for New Zealand her name was shortened to Challenger, with its Māori translation, Kaitaki, also appearing on its bow, being used for marketing purposes (the other two Interislander ferries at the time, Arahura and Aratere, had Māori names). In April 2007 the ship was renamed Kaitaki. Like the Kaiārahi she is an Interislander ferry without a rail deck for the transport of railway wagons.

In 2009, it was announced that the initial five-year lease would be extended. The lease was renewed again on 16 April 2013 until 2017 with the option to extend another three years thereafter. In May 2017, KiwiRail purchased the Kaitaki outright from the Irish Continental Group.

== Incidents ==
Over the years the vessel has had a number of incidents.

Overnight on June 20 2013, during a storm, Kaitaki snapped its moorings at its Wellington Berth and suffered light damage. It remained in the harbour until the next day.

On the evening of 28 January 2023, Kaitaki suffered an incident where she lost power (including propulsion) around 5pm for several hours. However, the ship managed to anchor safely, did not encounter any further danger, and power was eventually restored to the vessel later that night. The Transport Accident Investigation Commission launched an investigation due to the incident's impact on transportation safety, and to make recommendations to prevent future incidents. The Commission identified that a major cause of the loss of power was the rupture of a rubber expansion joint in the engine cooling system, which had been neither installed nor maintained in accordance with the manufacturer's guidance; a preliminary report was issued on 4 May to ensure that their safety recommendations would be applied more widely.

Maritime New Zealand filed a charge against KiwiRail in January 2024 for violating the Health and Safety at Work Act in the loss-of-power incident. The Maritime Union backed the decision to pursue legal action against KiwiRail. On 9 September 2024, KiwiRail agreed to pay a fine of NZ$432,500 to Maritime NZ for exposing passengers to risk when the Kaitaki lost power in late January 2023.

On the evening of 9 August 2023, Kaitaki was exiting Wellington Harbour where she experienced steering issues and was forced to return to berth, with a small number of passengers spending the night onboard.

Kaitaki features vehicle loading doors at the bow and the stern, allowing vehicles to drive on and off. In August 2023 the bow door was damaged by rough seas.
