= Interislander =

Ferry service across the Cook Strait in New Zealand

The Interislander Ngā Waka (Māori)
- Type: Part of state-owned enterprise
- Industry: Rail transport in New Zealand; Ferry transport
- Founded: 1962 (64 years ago)
- Headquarters: Wellington, New Zealand
- Area served: Cook Strait, New Zealand
- Services: Inter-island ferries
- Parent: KiwiRail
- Divisions: Interislander (passenger); Interislander Freight (freight)
- Website: www.interislander.co.nz

Ferry route

Interislander is a road and rail ferry service across New Zealand's Cook Strait, between Wellington in the North Island and Picton in the South Island. It is owned and operated by state-owned rail operator KiwiRail. Two roll-on roll-off (RORO) vessels operate the 50-nautical-mile (93 km; 58 mi) route, taking about three hours to complete the crossing.

The inter-island rail ferry service began in August 1962, operated by the New Zealand Railways Department (NZR). The service primarily provided a RORO rail link between its North and South Island networks, allowing NZR to compete directly with coastal shipping companies for inter-island freight. It also provided the first RORO road link between the two islands, which saw the Wellington to Picton ferries compete with, and then completely replace, the Union Company's Wellington–Lyttelton ferry service. Today, the Interislander service is still well patronised despite competition with Bluebridge on the Wellington–Picton sea route and from airlines, carrying around one million passengers and 230,000 vehicles per year on 5,500 sailings.

In 2017, Interislander became part of Great Journeys New Zealand, a new tourism brand created by KiwiRail to unite its four scenic passenger services: Interislander, Northern Explorer, Coastal Pacific and the TranzAlpine.

== History ==
=== Introduction ===
Before 1962, the North Island and South Island rail networks were not connected, and the New Zealand Railways Department (NZR) struggled to compete with ships for inter-island transport. In the days before containerisation, rail freight between the islands had to be railed in a wagon to Wellington, unloaded and transferred onto a ship to Picton or Lyttelton, then loaded into another wagon before being railed the rest of the way. The Union Steam Ship Company (USSC) ran an overnight ferry between Lyttelton and Wellington using steamers. NZR also contracted SAFE Air to run its Rail Air airfreight service for freight between the islands, from Paraparaumu to Blenheim, but this was limited to aircraft payloads.

The decision to start a rail ferry was made in 1958 by the Cook Strait Transport Enquiry Committee. The enquiry was set up following Union Steam Ship's decision to withdraw the unprofitable Tamahine, built in 1925. NZR was officially reluctant to compete with USSC for inter-island traffic, but supplied the New Zealand Railway Officers' Institute with information to put to the enquiry.

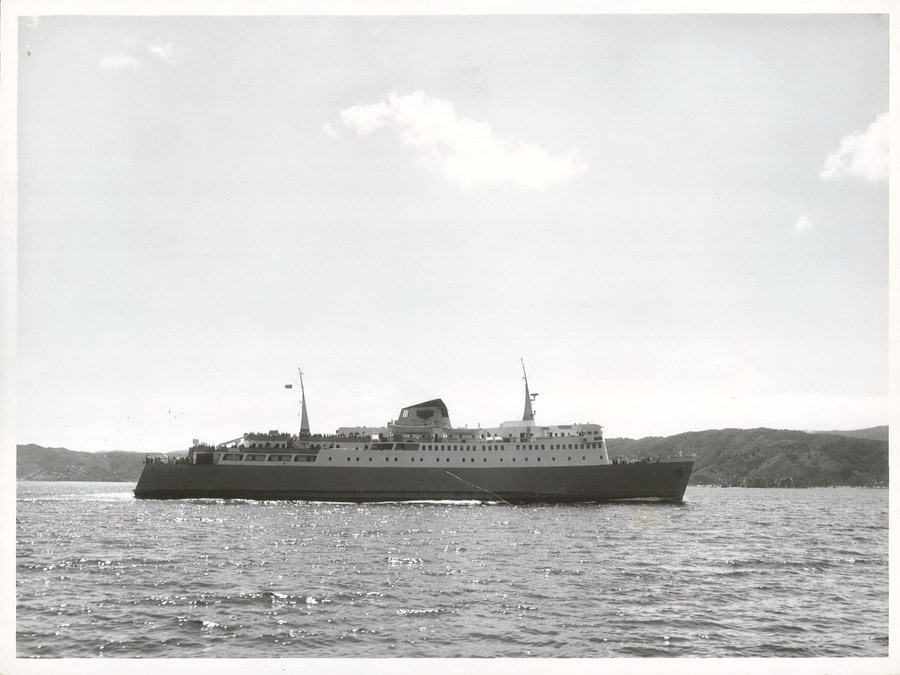
GMV Aramoana was the first ferry to enter service.

The Cook Strait Inter-Island Rail and Road Service (as it was known) started on 11 August 1962 with the roll-on roll-off ferry GMV Aramoana. The service dramatically increased efficiency, since freight could stay in the same wagon for the whole journey, reducing time and money. Aramoana took just 3 hours 20 minutes to cross Cook Strait, dramatically decreasing the time between the two islands for cars and passengers – Wellington to Christchurch travel time was reduced from 11 hours on the USSC ferry to nine hours by NZR ferry and road. The initial service was one sailing each way per day, Wellington to Picton in the morning and Picton to Wellington in the afternoon. The new service led to the decline of NZR's Rail Air service, which saw a dramatic drop in airfreight.

The service was an immediate success, although it was criticised for high prices. At NZ £9 10s one way for a family of four and a car up to 4.04 m (equal to NZ$395 in 2016 dollars,) many people thought the service was overpriced for a state-operated service. Nevertheless, it was very profitable for NZR - in the 1963-64 financial year, it contributed £535,000 of NZR's £538,500 working profit.

The service expanded with the addition of Aranui in 1966, Arahanga in 1972 and Aratika in 1974. The Union Company responded to the competition by converting TEV Maori to take roll-on roll-off (RORO) road traffic and ordering a new RORO ship, Wahine. However, the resurgence was short-lived: on 10 April 1968, Wahine foundered at the entrance to Wellington Harbour during a storm, resulting in 53 deaths. By the time replacement ship TEV Rangatira entered service in 1972, competition from the Cook Strait ferries and increased competition from air travel, especially following the National Airways Corporation's introduction of the Boeing 737 in 1968, saw the Wellington-Lyttelton service become uneconomic. The Union Company withdrew in 1974, and after two years under the Ministry of Transport, the service was cancelled in September 1976. In 1983, Arahura joined the fleet to replace the ageing Aramoana and Aranui. The faster Arahura reduced the time across Cook Strait by 20 minutes to three hours.

Initially, USSC operated the ferries on NZR's behalf. This changed in 1970 when the Minister of Railways, Peter Gordon, announced that NZR would be forming its own maritime service to operate the inter-island ferries.

=== SeaRail and The Interislander ===
When the New Zealand Railways Corporation (the successor to the Railways Department) was restructured in 1982, the service was renamed 'SeaRail'. In 1989, it was renamed the Interisland Line, and the service became known as The Interislander. The fleet was upgraded with improved facilities and an updated livery whose logo incorporated Pelorus Jack. In 1991, New Zealand Rail Ltd, including the Interisland Line, was separated from the Railways Corporation. In 1993, New Zealand Rail Ltd was privatised and became Tranz Rail in 1995. In 1999, Tranz Rail leased Aratere, and between 1999 and 2001, disposed of Arahanga and Aratika.

In 1990, the Interislander launched an advertising campaign with the jingle "Cruisin' on the Interislander (Sailing to the Other Side)" written and performed by Wellington band The Warratahs. The jingle became iconic, with a second jingle "Easy Come, Easy Go (Cruisin' on the Interislander)" by the Warratahs released in 1998.

In 2004, Toll NZ bought out Tranz Rail, and the Interisland Line was renamed the Interislander. Both ships were repainted in a new livery, with a fern replacing Pelorus Jack on the funnel - he moved to the hull with the logo. In 2005, Toll leased Challenger, which in 2007 was renamed Kaitaki. It was the first Interislander ferry without a rail deck, and the first with a bow door (all the other ferries were stern boarding).

=== KiwiRail ===
On 1 July 2008, the New Zealand Government purchased Toll NZ, including Interislander, which became part of KiwiRail.

In 2011, Aratere was lengthened by adding a 30-metre midsection to increase its capacity.

In November 2012, Interislander staff threatened strike action over the upcoming Christmas period, demanding better wages. Owner KiwiRail responded with a lock-out notice. Freight company Mainfreight slammed the union's actions as "bloody disruptive".

In November 2013, Aratere snapped a drive shaft and lost a propeller in the Cook Strait. Interislander chartered Stena Alegra to help with the peak summer period while Aratere was under repair. In December 2014, it was announced Stena Alegra would be chartered long-term to replace the ageing Arahura. Arahura last sailed on 29 July 2015, and the Stena Alegra, refurbished and renamed Kaiārahi, entered service in September 2015.

=== Fast ferry services ===
The Lynx was the Interislander's fast ferry service across Cook Strait. Pressured by Christchurch businessman Brooke McKenzie and his ill-fated Sea Shuttles NZ fast ferry service, the Interisland Line chartered the Condor 10 to operate a fast service across the strait for the 1994/95 summer. The "Vomit Comet", as it was sometimes dubbed, was an initial success, taking half the time of the regular Interislander ferries. Condor 10 returned to serve as The Lynx every summer until 1999, when it was replaced by the Condor Vitesse for the 1999/2000 summer. A year-round service was started in 2000 with Normandie Express, which was replaced in 2003 by Incat 046.

In 1994, speed restrictions were imposed in Wellington Harbour to reduce wash and protect ships berthed at Aotea Quay, and in May 2000 an 18-nautical-mile-per-hour (21 mph; 33 km/h) speed limit was imposed on all ships in the Marlborough Sounds after residents complained of shoreline damage caused by the ferries. By 2002, The Lynx took 2 hours, 15 minutes to complete its journey. This was only a 45-minute advantage over the Arahura and Aratere, which had the advantage of being able to operate in swells above The Lynx's limit of 4.0 metres (13.1 ft), which were common in Cook Strait and frequently caused cancellations. The Lynx ceased operation in 2003.

=== Proposed ferry terminal redevelopment ===
Interislander planned to introduce new hybrid electric ferries that were 30 m (98 ft) longer than those currently in operation. In 2020, following two years of discussion with stakeholders, Greater Wellington Regional Council announced that it had chosen Kaiwharawhara as its preferred site for a new ferry terminal. The terminal was to be built on land owned by KiwiRail, CentrePort and the NZ Transport Agency. The new terminal was to accommodate the larger ferries and replace the two separate terminals currently used by StraitNZ and the Interislander. In addition, CentrePort would be able to make changes to the layout of its other port operations. The plan included a wharf about 250 m (820 ft) long, a ferry terminal building, changes to road, rail and pedestrian access, and marshalling and loading areas. The panel that approved the project called it the biggest rail capital project since World War II.

In 2020, KiwiRail proposed to build a KiwiRail-only central city terminal near King's Wharf to replace the combined Kaiwharawhara ferry terminal plan. This KiwiRail-only terminal might later be expanded to include other users like StraitNZ, but this plan was abandoned, as it was opposed by almost every other harbour user and the city and regional councils. KiwiRail claimed that the Kaiwharawhara site was an earthquake risk because of the Wellington Fault Line. Initial cost estimates in 2019 were $390 million to $730 million, and it could be built by the "mid-2020s" for the new ferries.

=== Proposed ferry replacements 2019-present ===
As of 2024, all Interislander vessels were built in the 1990s (1995 or 1998). All vessels were scheduled to be replaced by two identical rail capable vessels by 2024. The Aratere was retired from service on 18 August 2025.

A revised plan was that much larger rail–equipped ferries, designed by a leading ship's architect, would be introduced in 2024 and 2025. A NZ$551m contract for the two iReX (Note: Planned specifications: 220 metres (720 ft) Length overall; 50,000 GT; 20-knot service speed. Capacity for 1,910 passengers and a mixed-load deck for 42 rail wagons, 62 trucks, and 170 cars (total capacity of 652 cars). Propulsion was hybrid diesel-electric with battery banks designed for zero-emission port operations.) ferries was awarded to HD Hyundai Mipo in 2021, with deliveries in 2025 and 2026. The new ferries were to carry twice as many passengers and nearly double the number of trucks and other vehicles with triple rail capacity - 40 wagons on each ship.

==== Cancellation of ferry replacements ====
Following the 2023 New Zealand general election, the Minister of Finance Nicola Willis declined KiwiRail's request for an additional NZ$1.47 billion to replace its ageing Interislander ferry fleet. While the outgoing Labour Government had approved plans to buy two new (and larger) ferries (but in February 2023 had refused a request for $2.6 billion of extra funding), the incoming National-led coalition government regarded the project as too costly, with Willis likening the proposed ferries to Ferraris, and stating that the Government would be looking for cheaper alternative ferries. Willis said that only 21% of the total cost was for the ferries, with most for port redevelopment. Initially two texts were sent to South Korea before the pending announcement. The chairman of the Greater Wellington Regional Council, Daran Ponter, was aware of the extent of the port redevelopment proposed (as was his Picton counterpart), and had expressed concern as the port companies would be expected to finance part of the work.

The Government's decision to scrap the ferry replacement project was criticised by Labour's finance spokesperson, Grant Robertson, and several unions including the Maritime Union of New Zealand, the Rail and Maritime Transport Union, the New Zealand Merchant Service Guild and the Aviation and Marine Engineers Association.

In early March 2025, Radio New Zealand reported that the government had allocated NZ$300 million to cover the cancellation of the iReX ferry project including cancelled infrastructure contracts and a break-fee with Hyundai. On 15 August, Minister for Rail Winston Peters confirmed that KiwiRail had agreed to pay HD Hyundai Mipo NZ$144 million in compensation for the New Zealand Government's 2023 cancellation of the Project iReX ferries.

==== Sixth National Government ferry replacements, 2025–present ====
In early March 2025, Winston Peters embarked on an international tender to find a builder to build two cheaper and smaller rail-enabled ferries to replace the current Interislander vessels. The Government's goal is to have the replacement ferries operational by 2029. On 1 March, Peters visited Hyundai's headquarters in Seoul to discuss the tender proposal. Peters told Radio New Zealand that Hyundai was open to considering bidding to build the two replacement ferries based on the new size specifications.

On 31 March 2025, Peters released details of the two new Interislander replacement ferries, which will be 200m long, 28m wide and have rail decks. The ferries are expected to be completed by Christmas 2029. The port infrastructure at Picton is expected to be replaced while the Wellington infrastructure will be upgraded. Peters confirmed that the government was searching for a shipyard to build the ferries and is expected to sign a contract in late 2025. The Government has also established a company called Ferry Holdings to build the necessary supporting infrastructure. KiwiRail Chief Executive Peter Reidy welcomed news that the two replacement ferries would be rail enabled, while Mayor of Marlborough Nadine Taylor said the announcement would give certainty to plan the new port infrastructure at Picton. In contrast, the Labour Party's transport spokesperson Tangi Utikere criticised the cancellation of the previous government's iReX project and questioned the lack of detail in the government's ferry procurement plan.

On 14 October 2025, Peters confirmed that the state-owned Ferry Holdings Limited had contracted the Chinese state-owned shipyard COMEC (formerly the Guangzhou Shipyard International) to construct two new Interislander ferries, which are expected to be delivered in 2029. Each of the two new rail-enabled ferries would be able to carry 1,500 passengers and 2.4km of lanes for trucks, cars and 40 rail wagons. To accommodate the new ferries, the Government confirmed that new wharves, linkspans and a rail overbridge would be built in Picton while Wellington's wharf would be expanded. COMEC is owned by the China State Shipbuilding Corporation (CSSC), which supplies warships and equipment to the People's Liberation Army Navy (PLA-N). Due to COMEC's connections to the Chinese military, Defence Minister Judith Collins confirmed that New Zealand's intelligence services, the New Zealand Security Intelligence Service (NZSIS) and Government Communications Security Bureau (GCSB), would vet the procurement process.

On 19 November 2025, Peters stated that the overall Cook Strait ferry replacement project would cost less than $2 billion, with briefing documents estimating a total budget of NZ$1.86 billion. He confirmed that taxpayers would fund less than $1.7 billion of the project, with the remainder covered by port companies and operational revenue. Peters said the contract between state-owned Ferry Holdings Limited and Guangzhou Shipyard International was a fixed-price $596 million for construction of the two ships, and argued the new approach represented a saving of $2.3 billion compared with the cancelled iReX programme. Other costs would be NZ$531 million for Picton infrastructure, $325 million for Wellington infrastructure, and $415 million for project management and contingency. He said infrastructure costs would be recovered over the life of the vessels through port fees, and that Interislander would be expected to build financial reserves to fund future fleet replacement. The new ferries will each be 200 m long, rail-enabled, and able to carry up to 1,530 passengers. The new ferries will offer improved thrust, stability, and reduced coastal impact in the Marlborough Sounds, although Peters acknowledged that they would be smaller and NZ$45 million more expensive than the vessels originally planned under iReX. Wellington mayor Andrew Little and Marlborough mayor Nadine Taylor welcomed the revised approach to infrastructure costs.

On 17 July 2026, Peters announced that the two new Interislander ferries would be named Kupe and Cook, after Polynesian explorer Kupe and British explorer James Cook. KiwiRail will operate the ferries when they arrive in 2029, with ownetship vested in Ferry Holdings Limited. KiwiRail will be required to build a reserve so that it can acquire the ferries by 2059.

== Fleet ==
=== Current fleet ===
Name	Image	Shipyard	Launched	Entered service	Port of registry	Tonnage	Notes
Kaiārahi		Astilleros Españoles, Seville, Spain	1998	2015	(United Kingdom) London, England	22,152 GT	Built in 1998 as Dawn Merchant. Chartered temporarily in 2014 as the Stena Alegra while Aratere was out of service. Chartered long-term in 2015, with the vessel being renamed Kaiarahi.
Kaitaki		Van der Giessen de Noord, Rotterdam, Netherlands	1995	2005	Wellington, New Zealand	22,365 GT	Built in 1994 as Isle of Innisfree. Chartered in 2005 as Challenger, with the vessel being renamed Kaitaki in 2007. Purchased in 2017, with her home port moving to Wellington.

=== Historic fleet ===
Name	Image	Shipyard	Launched	Entered service	Retired from service	Tonnage	Notes
Aramoana		(United Kingdom) William Denny & Brothers, Dumbarton, Scotland	1961	1962	1985	4,160 GRT	
Aranui		(United Kingdom) Vickers Limited, Newcastle upon Tyne, England	1965	1966	1985	4,160 GRT	
Arahanga		(United Kingdom) Upper Clyde Shipbuilders, Glasgow, Scotland	1972	1972	2001		Built as a cargo ferry with four tracks for railway wagons and additional capacity for road trucks. Originally designed to only carry 40 passengers, it was refitted in 1984 to carry 100.
Aratika		Chantiers Dubigeon, Nantes, France	1974	1974	1999	9,035 GT	Originally freight only. Converted to passenger use in 1976.
Purbeck		Ateliers et Chantiers du Havre, Le Havre, France	1978	2003	2006	6,507 GT	
Arahura		Aalborg Shipyard, Aalborg, Denmark	1982	1983	2015	13,621 GT	
Condor 10 "The Lynx"		Incat, Hobart, Australia	1992	1994	1999	3,240 GT	
Condor Vitesse "The Lynx"		Incat, Hobart, Australia	1996	1999	2000	5,007 GT	
Normandie Express "The Lynx"		Incat, Hobart, Australia	2000	2000	2002	6,581 GT	
Incat 046 "The Lynx"		Incat, Hobart, Australia	1997	2002	2003	5,707 GT	
Valentine		Kawasaki Heavy Industries Shipyard, Sakaide, Japan	1999	2021	2023	23,987 GT	Roll-on/roll-off cargo ship chartered in 2021, purchased in 2022. Sold in 2023 to Greece, and reported at Perama in 2024.
Aratere		Hijos de J. Barreras, Vigo, Spain	1998	1999	2025	17,816 GRT	Aratere was a rail ferry, carrying 32 rail wagons on 'Deck 2' and road vehicles on 'Deck 3' entering via a ramp through a linkspan The vessel could carry either 30 trucks or 230 cars. Lengthened in 2011 by 30 metres to increase capacity. Retired in August 2025 and sold for scrapping in India.
