= Aratere =

Rail and vehicle ferry launched in 1998

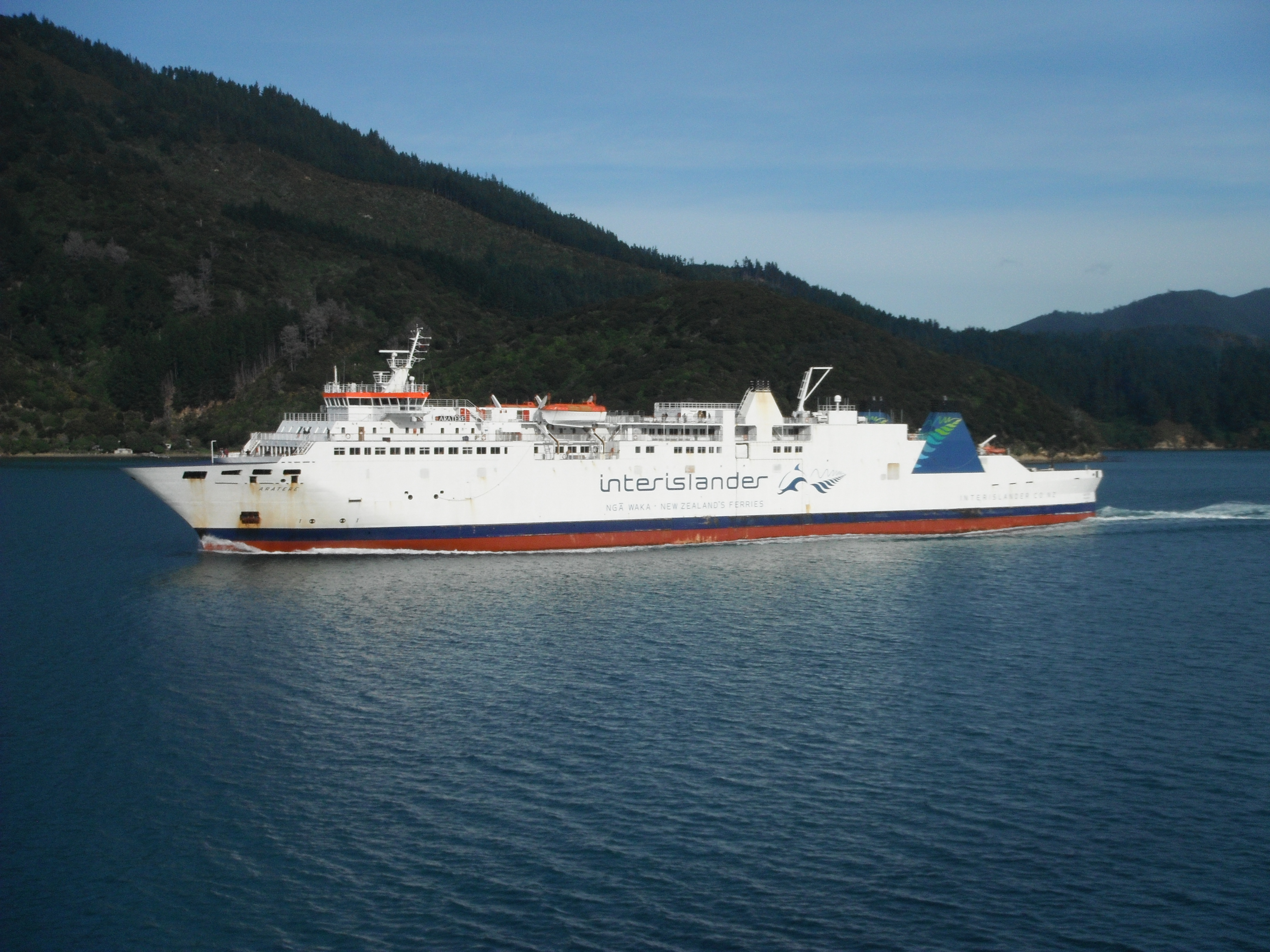
- Aratere in Tory Channel, June 2018

History
- Name: 1998–2025: Aratere; 2025 onwards: Vega
- Owner: KiwiRail
- Operator: Interislander
- Port of registry: Wellington, New Zealand
- Route: Wellington to Picton
- Builder: Hijos de J. Barreras, Spain
- Cost: NZ$132 million
- Yard number: 1570
- Launched: 8 September 1998
- Christened: 1999
- Completed: 15 December 1998
- In service: 1 February 1999
- Out of service: 18 August 2025
- Identification: IMO number: 9174828; MMSI number: 512071000; Callsign: ZMII
- Status: Scrapped at Alang 2026

General characteristics
- Tonnage: 12,596 GT (original); 17,816 GT (current)
- Length: 150 m (492 ft 2 in) overall (original); 183.6 m (602 ft 4 in) overall (current); 168.3 m (552 ft 2 in) bpp (current)
- Beam: 20.5 m (67 ft 3 in)
- Draft: 5.5 m (18 ft 1 in)
- Decks: 6
- Installed power: Four Wärtsilä 8L32 diesel engines; 3,680 kW (4,930 hp) at 750 rpm, Two Wärtsilä 8L20 diesel engines.; 1,300 kW (1,700 hp); Two KameWa Bow Thrusters each at 1,000 rpm.
- Propulsion: Fixed propellers, each four blades inward turning
- Speed: 19.5 knots (36.1 km/h; 22.4 mph)
- Capacity: 670 passengers; 230 cars or 30 trucks (800 tonnes); 32 rail wagons (1,700 tonnes)
- Crew: 31

Aratere was a roll-on/roll-off rail and vehicle ferry operated by KiwiRail in New Zealand. Built in 1998 for Tranz Rail and lengthened in 2011, she operated four daily crossings on the Interislander service across Cook Strait from Wellington to Picton each day (with six crossings over the December/January period).

As of 2024, Aratere was New Zealand's only rail ferry. When the vessel was not available, rail freight between the North and South Islands had to be transferred to trucks, driven onto other Cook Strait ferries, and then transferred back to rail after the crossing, with associated additional time and cost. She was retired in August 2025 and sold for scrapping in India.

== Construction ==
In 1997, Tranz Rail ordered a new ferry to replace Aratika. The shipbuilding contract for the new vessel, named Aratere, was awarded to Hijos de J. Barreras in Vigo, Spain. She was laid down in November 1997 and launched on 8 September 1998. The vessel was handed over to Tranz Rail on 16 December 1998.

=== Layout ===
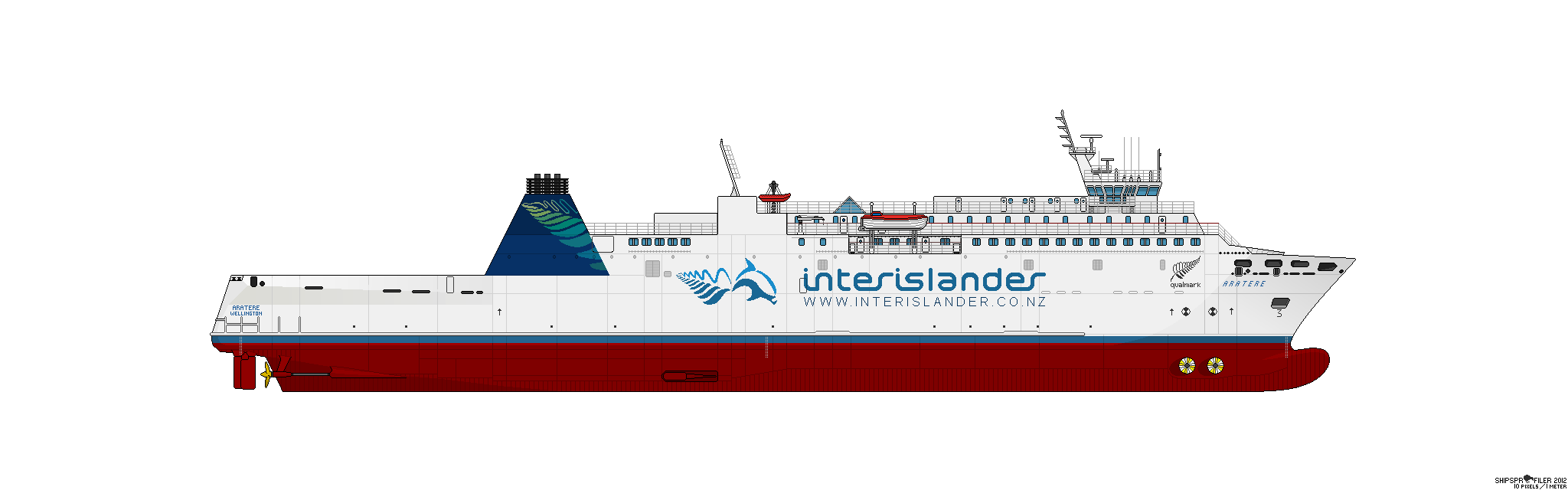
Profile of Aratere in 2009, prior to her lengthening

Aratere had both rail and vehicle decks. These could be loaded simultaneously through the stern via a double linkspan. A lower hold had additional space for cars, though access to this hold was blocked off after the refit in Singapore.

Aratere had six decks.

- Deck 1 – Engine and propulsion rooms
- Deck 2 – Rail deck
- Deck 3 – Road vehicle deck
- Deck 4 – Bar, Foodcourt, Shop, Lounge, Deck Access
- Deck 5 – Premium Lounge, Drivers Accommodation, Deck Access including outdoor seating.
- Deck 6 – Bridge and sun deck

== History ==
Aratere departed Spain for New Zealand on 16 December 1998. Her voyage took longer than anticipated. On 20 December, fuses on the starboard motors blew. When the replacement fuses were fitted, they blew as well. The following day, the couplings connecting the gearboxes with the port motors failed, leaving Aratere adrift in the South Atlantic. The couplings were removed from the starboard motor and used for the port ones.

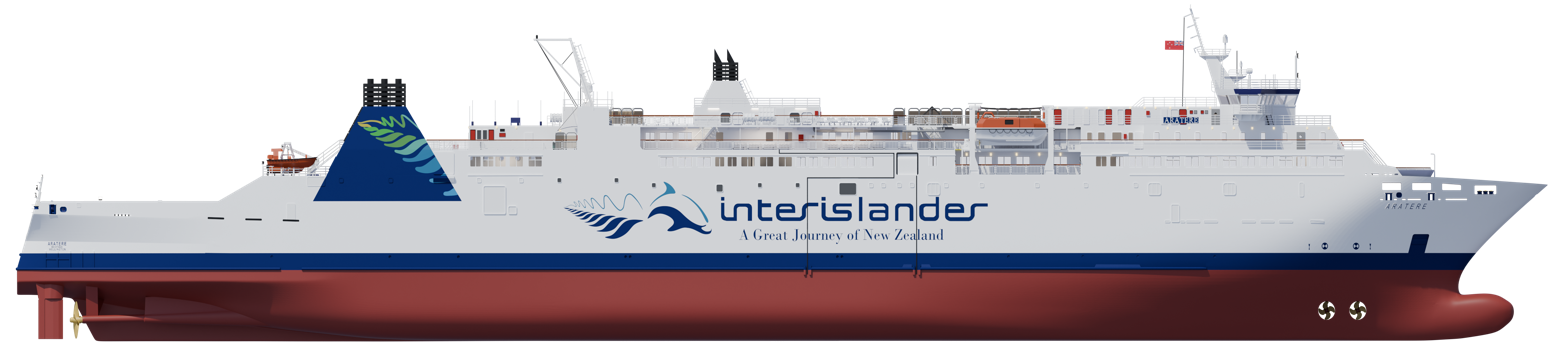
Starboard profile view of Aratere, post 2011 lengthening

In 2011, Aratere underwent a $52 million refit at the Sembawang shipyard in Singapore, increasing her capacity from 360 to 600 passengers. The refit included a new bow. The ship was lengthened by cutting her in half to insert a new 30-metre (98 ft) midsection.

=== Service ===
Aratere operated up to six crossings of the Cook Strait each day. In late 2009, Aratere celebrated her 20,000th crossing, having travelled around 2 million kilometres.

Upon retirement Aratere celebrated a record 53,000 crossings and has carried more than five million passengers.

=== Incidents ===
Aratere has been involved in several technical problems and engine failures over her years in service. There is no official relationship between these incidents, though the media have stoked speculation that the ferry may be jinxed and she earned the nickname "El Lemon".

- 5 July 2003 – Aratere collided with a moored fishing vessel in Wellington Harbour.
- 1 October 2004 – "30 seconds of potential disaster" after Aratere had a steering fault in the Marlborough Sounds.
- 10 February 2005 – Aratere was detained after a "crisis of confidence" with inspectors noting that she had arrived from Spain six years earlier in a shocking state. They could no longer allow her to operate as she was. She was eventually allowed to sail again on 15 March.
- On 5 November 2013, Aratere snapped a drive shaft, losing a propeller in Cook Strait. This initially forced the ship out of service, causing disruption to Interislander schedules. As a replacement propeller was required and had to be shipped from Europe, the she was out of service for some time. Subsequently, the ship was allowed to make freight only crossings with only one propeller for propulsion.

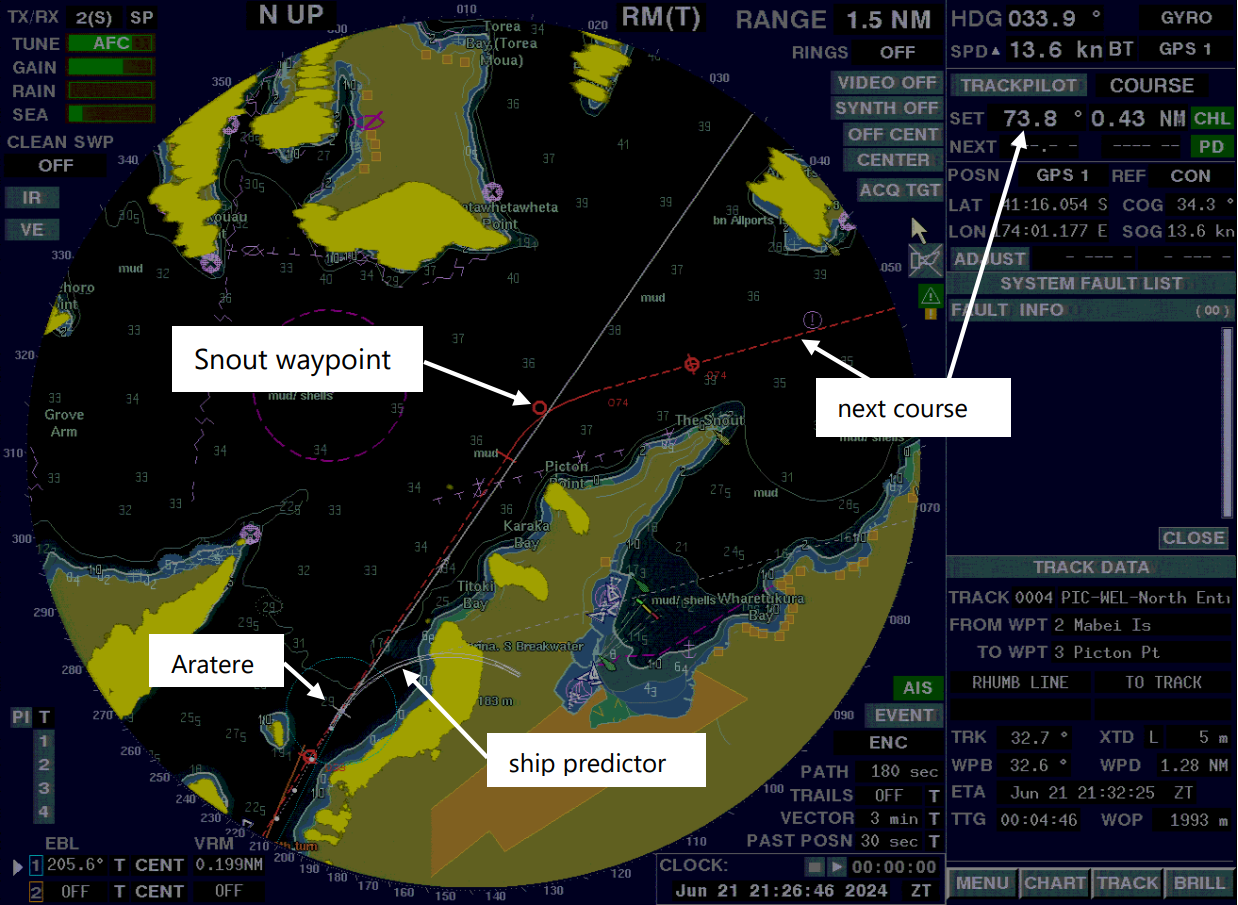
Aratere's ECDIS shows the premature turn into the bay

- 21 June 2024 – Aratere made a premature turn to a waypoint shortly after leaving Picton harbour and ran aground. She was refloated at 9pm the next night by the Maungatea and Monowai tugs as well as with her own engines 24 hours after the incident occurred. On 11 July, Acting-Prime Minister Winston Peters alleged that KiwiRail had covered up the cause of the Aratere's grounding and claimed that a crew member had left the boat on autopilot while having a cup of coffee. Peters' allegations were disputed by Interislander operations general manager Duncan Roy. Interislander subsequently acknowledged that a crew member had prematurely selected a turn that caused the ferry to sail directly to Titoki Bay, nearly a nautical mile away from a shore point called "The Snout."

=== Retirement ===
On 30 April 2025, KiwiRail chief executive Peter Reidy confirmed that the Aratere would be retired by the end of 2025 to facilitate work to demolish Picton's wharf infrastructure in anticipation of the two new Cook Strait ferries expected to be delivered in 2029. The wharf infrastructure would be replaced by new specific loading and unloading infrastructure that could not be used on the Aratere. Since the Aratere was the only rail-enabled ferry in KiwiRail's fleet, the company is using road-bridging on the Kaitaki and Kaiārahi until the new ferries arrive.

In response to the planned decommissioning of the Aratere, KiwiRail announced that it proposed eliminating 70 jobs from the ferry's deck and catering departments.

On 18 August 2025 Aratere was retired after the Kaiarahi returned from drydock maintenance and began operating on a new schedule, with the Aratere's last sailing being the 11:00 am departure from Picton. She was sold to India for recycling and will be recycled by JRD Industries at Alang. After sale the ferry was renamed Vega and re-registered at Basseterre, Saint Kitts and Nevis.

The ship arrived back in Wellington, NZ on 31 May 2026, having anchored off Nelson to refuel after being granted clearance for a one-way scrap voyage to Alang, India. The ship departed from Wellington on 6 June 2026 and was beached in Alang, India on 3 July 2026 for scrapping.
