= Kaiārahi =

Roll-on roll-off ferry used in New Zealand

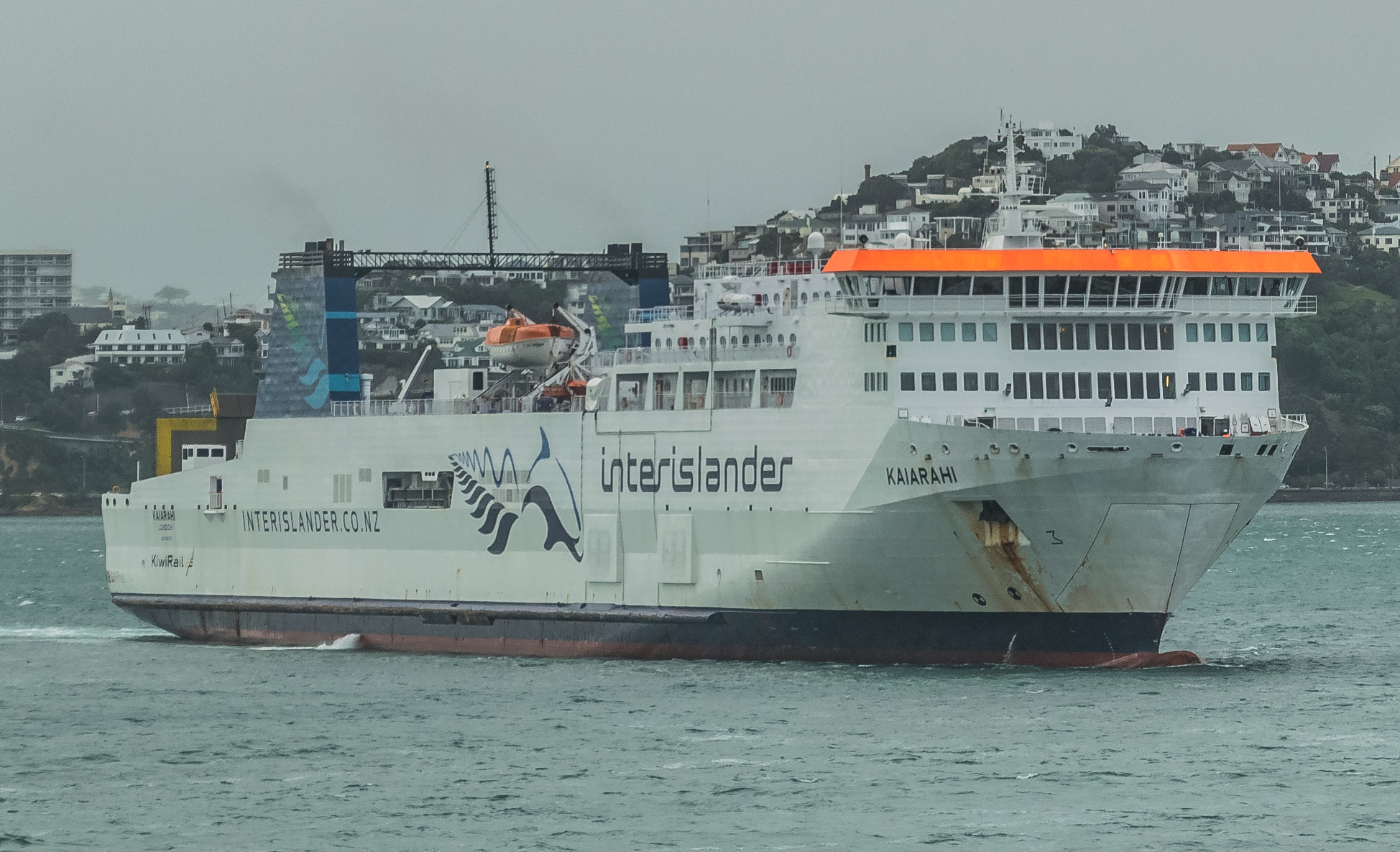

History
- Name: Dawn Merchant (1998-2005); Europax Appia (2005-2006); Pau Casals (2006-2008); Ave Luebeck (2008-2009); T-Rex (2009-2010); Norman Trader (2010-2013); Stena Alegra (2013-2015); Kaiarahi (2015-)
- Owner: Cenargo International Ltd (1998-2005); Daybreak Shipping Ltd (2005-2013); Stena RoRo (2013-2017); Interislander (2017-present)
- Operator: Und RO-RO (1998-1999); Norse Merchant Ferries (1998-2002 & 2005); Norfolkline (2002-2005 & 2010); Balearia (2006-2008); Caronte & Tourist (2008); T-Link Lines (2009); Cotunav (2009-2010); LD Lines (2010 & 2011); P&O Ferries (2011); Stena Line (2011-2015); Interislander (2015-)
- Port of registry: Wellington; New Zealand
- Builder: Astilleros Españoles S.A. (AESA) Seville, Spain.
- Yard number: 287
- Laid down: April 15 1997
- Launched: February 1998
- Maiden voyage: October 1998
- Identification: IMO number: 9147291; MMSI number: 512144000; Callsign: ZMKL
- Status: Active

General characteristics
- Class & type: Ro-Ro ferry
- Tonnage: 22,152 GT
- Length: 179.93 m (590.3 ft)
- Beam: 25.24 m (82.8 ft)
- Draught: 6.5 m (21.3 ft)
- Decks: 9
- Installed power: 4 Wärtsilä 9L38 engines each producing 5,940 kW (7,970 hp) @ 600rpm; with 2 Brunvoll 1,300 kW (1,700 hp) Bow thrusters
- Propulsion: 2 Wärtsilä-Wichmann controllable pitch propellers
- Speed: 19 knots (35 km/h; 22 mph)
- Capacity: 550 passengers and any combination of 5,100 tonnes of up to: - 525 cars; - 108 semi-trailers; - 65 trucks; - 1,900 lane metres
- Crew: 60-65

Kaiārahi is a roll-on/roll-off ferry operated by Interislander on the Wellington to Picton interisland route between the North and South islands of New Zealand. As of September 2025 Kaiarahi operates four crossings of the Cook Strait each day, taking on a new schedule after the retirement of the Aratere.

== History ==
Built as the Dawn Merchant for Cenargo International in 1998, and was launched in February 1998, that same year she was chartered to Und RORO for service in Turkey. In 1999, she was chartered to Norse Merchant Ferries and Norfolkline in 2002. In 2005, she transferred back to Norse Merchant Ferries and was sold to Daybreak Shipping Ltd, where she was renamed the Europax Appia. In 2006, she was chartered to Balearia, where she was then renamed Pau Casals. In 2009, she was transferred to T-Link Lines, where she was renamed "T-Rex".

In 2010, she was renamed the Norman Trader and chartered to LD Lines. She remained with them until the closure of the Dover to Boulogne route, where she then transferred to other LD Lines routes until 2011, when she was chartered to both P&O Ferries and Stena Line and then laid up in the River Fal at Falmouth.

== Stena Line ==
In May 2013 Stena Line announced that they were going to purchase the Norman Trader for their Gdynia to Karlskrona route, she headed by tow to Gdynia where she was refitted and renamed the Stena Alegra in June 2013, on 8 July 2013 she started operating on the Gdynia to Karlskrona route. On 28 October, Stena Alegra was driven ashore at Karlskrona during the St Jude storm.

== Interislander ==
In November 2013 she was chartered by Interislander in New Zealand to operate on the Wellington–Picton route for six months. The charter was to assist Interislander's two other ships Kaitaki and Arahura with peak summer loadings while its third ship, Aratere, was out of service for repairs after losing a propeller in early November.

On 9 December 2014, an announcement was made that she would again be chartered long-term by Interislander to replace the aging Arahura, which had been in service since 1983 and was to retire in 2015. Before returning to New Zealand, she was refitted to better suit the Wellington to Picton route. She has been named Kaiarahi, from the Māori word for "leader" (kai- = agentive prefix, arahi = "to lead"). She was purchased by Interislander in 2017.

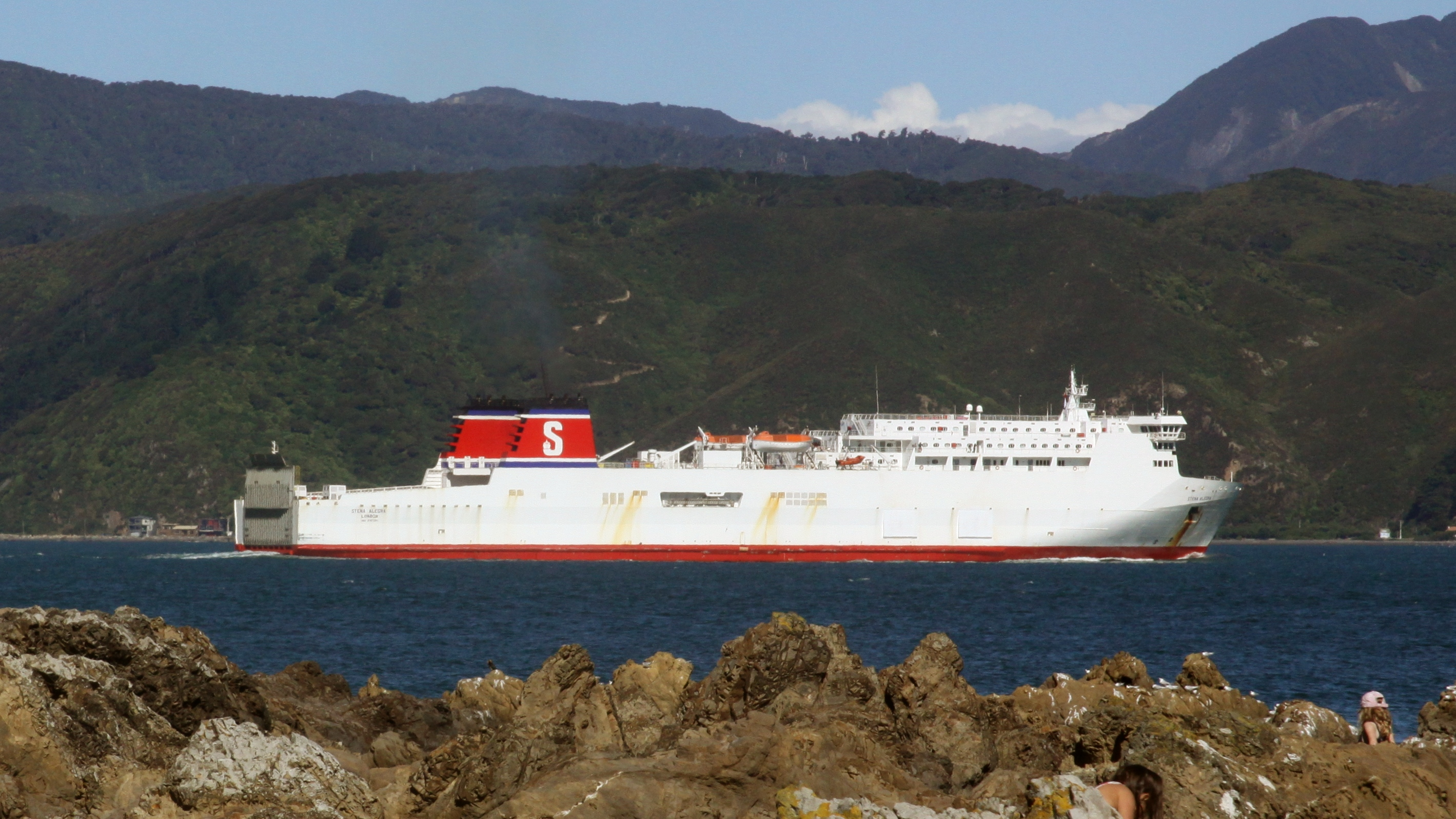
Stena Alegra leaving Wellington during her Interislander charter in January 2014

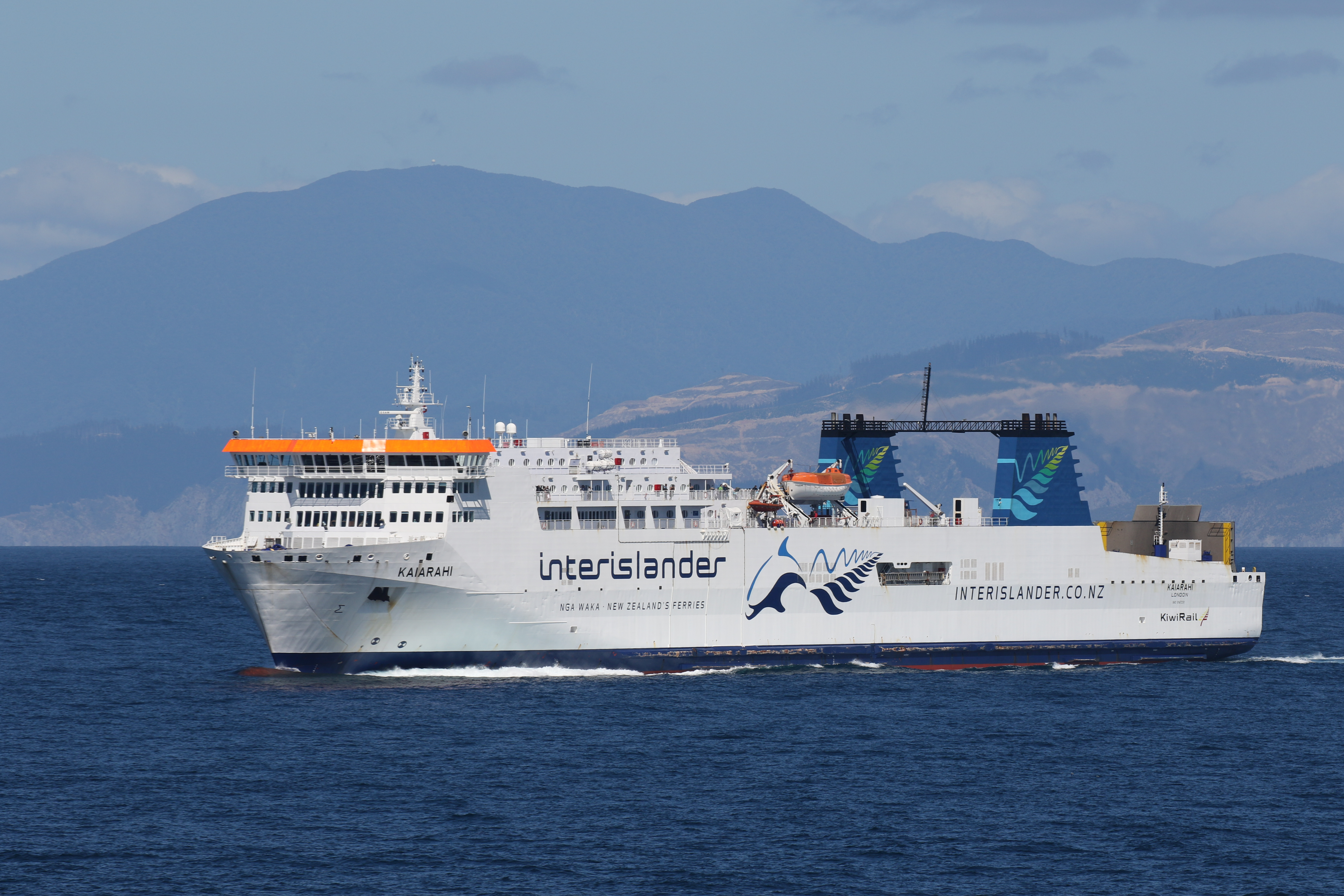
Kaiarahi returning to Wellington

=== Incidents ===
During her charter to Interislander from late 2013, she suffered several mechanical problems, including an engine failure in Wellington Harbour, a six-metre gash in the hull during berthing difficulties, and the loss of part of a propeller blade, though she was repaired and put back into service shortly after these incidents.

The Kaiarahi suffered a major gearbox failure while on a regular Cook Strait sailing 31 August 2021. After lengthy repairs she resumed operations on 17 September 2022.

On 10 March 2026, the Kaiarahi experienced a technical fault, which disrupted trips between the Cook Strait for several days. A staff member travelled overseas to obtain spareparts to repair the ship.
