= GMV Aranui =

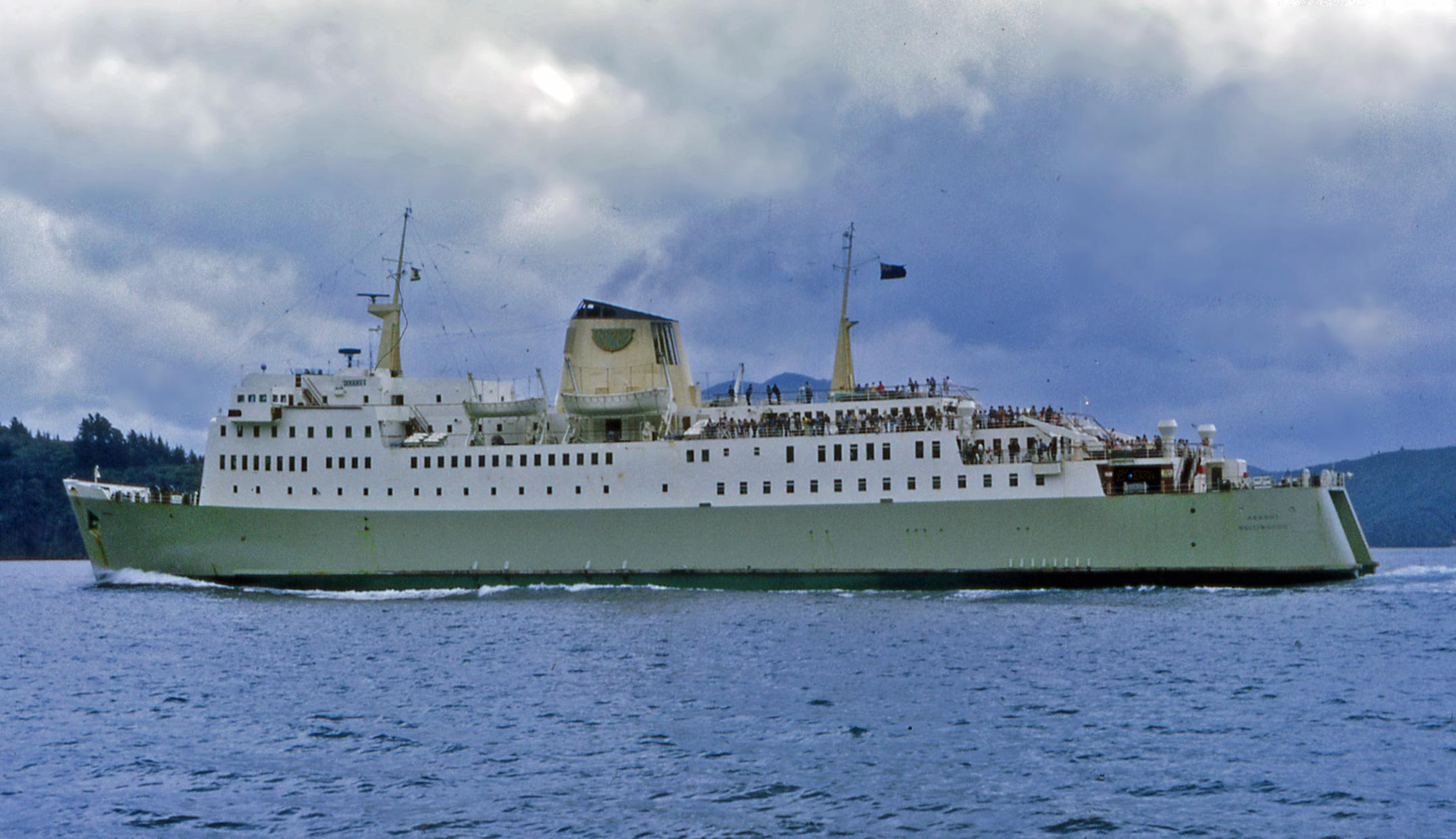
- Aranui in Queen Charlotte Sound in 1968

History
- Name: Aranui
- Owner: New Zealand Railways Department
- Route: Wellington to Picton
- Builder: Vickers, High Walker
- Cost: $NZ 4 million
- Yard number: 183
- Launched: 26 June 1965
- Completed: 1965
- Identification: IMO number: 6517067
- Fate: Scrapped at Chittagong 1994

General characteristics
- Tonnage: 3,281 GT; later 4,160
- Length: 112.2 m (368 ft)
- Beam: 18.6 m (61 ft)
- Draft: 4.78 metres (15.7 ft)
- Installed power: 6 × English Electric 16-cylinder 4-stroke turbocharged 16 CSVM diesel 10" x 21" design 900rpm, service 700rpm
- Propulsion: Electric drive to 2 shafts
- Speed: 19 knots (22 mph)
- Capacity: 800 passengers; 30 railroad cars; 70 cars
- Crew: 90

GMV Aranui was a roll-on/roll-off train ferry operating across the Cook Strait between 1966 and 1984.

== History ==
Government Motor Vessel (GMV) Aranui was built in 1965 for the New Zealand Railways Department for the service between the North and South Islands of New Zealand. She was built by Vickers in England. In February 1966, she sailed via the Panama Canal, arriving in Wellington on 28 May and entered service with her sister GMV Aramoana on 9 June. In 1977 she was rebuilt by Sims Engineering, Dunedin to carry 950 passengers to meet the increased traffic, following the company's main competitor, the Union Company's withdrawal from the route.

In 1983, Aranui and Aramoana were replaced by the significantly larger Arahura. Aranui was laid up in Wellington in June 1984 and sold four months later to the Najd Trading & Construction Company of Jeddah, Saudi Arabia. Renamed Aranui A and then Nui, she commenced service carrying Muslim pilgrims on the Red Sea.

In 1986, the ship was renamed Najd III. Five years later, following an engine failure, she was laid up at Singapore. In 1992, her owners were unable to make progress payments for a repair/refit. She arrived at a Chittagong breaker's yard on 3 November 1994.

== Layout ==
Aranui was slightly larger than Aramoana. She had a higher bridge and funnel than her older sister ship.

A combined vehicle deck could carry 70 cars and 30 rail wagons.

== Service ==
Aranui was built to operate a railway service between Wellington and Picton, later known as the Interislander.
