= Arahura =

Former train ferry of New Zealand

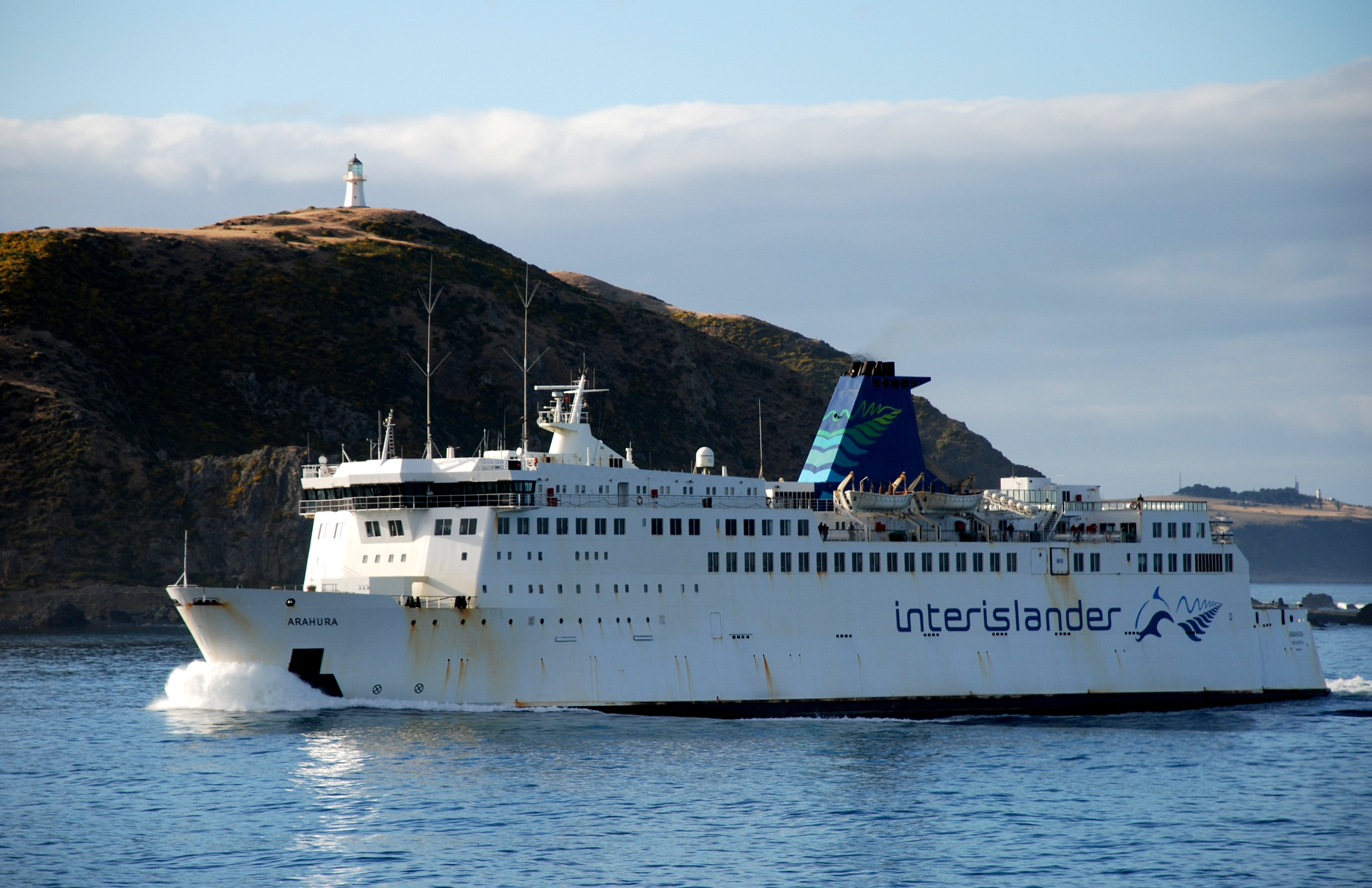
- Arahura at Pencarrow Head in 2004 livery, prior to the 2008 refit

History
- Name: Arahura
- Namesake: Māori: Pathway to Dawn
- Owner: KiwiRail
- Port of registry: Wellington, New Zealand
- Route: Wellington - Picton
- Builder: Aalborg Vaerft, Denmark
- Laid down: 1982
- Launched: 18 March 1983
- Completed: 1983
- Maiden voyage: 21 December 1983
- In service: 1983 - 2015
- Out of service: July 2015
- Identification: IMO number: 8201454
- Fate: Scrapped at Alang 2015

General characteristics
- Tonnage: 13621 gt
- Length: 148.3 m (487 ft)
- Beam: 20.5 m (67 ft)
- Draft: 5.47 m
- Decks: 9
- Installed power: Four Wärtsilä Vasa 12V32 diesel engines, each producing 4065 kW at 750 RPM coupled to 2 3800 kW General Electric Company generators via flexible shafts.
- Propulsion: Two 6700 kW propulsion motors driving two KaMeWa Controllable pitch propellers, each four blades inward turning at 214 RPM and 4.6 m (15 ft) in diameter.
- Speed: 19 knots (35 km/h)
- Capacity: 550 passengers (after 2008 refit) originally 1085 passengers; 142 cars; 60 rail vehicles
- Crew: 65

Arahura was a roll-on/roll-off train ferry that operated on the Interislander service between Wellington and Picton in New Zealand from 1983 until 2015.

== History ==
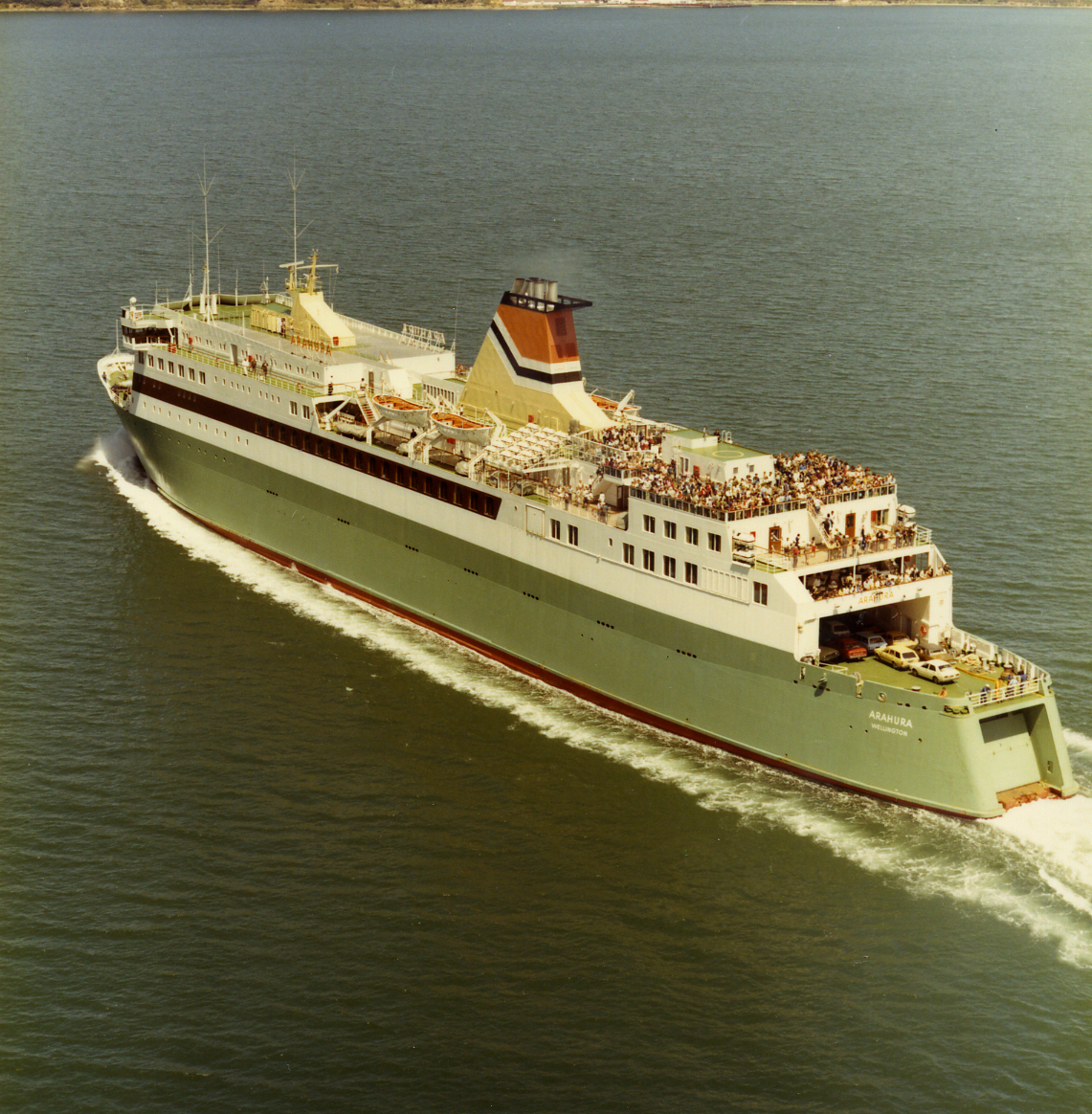
Arahura maiden voyage, 1983

Arahura was built for the New Zealand Railways Corporation by Aalborg Vaerft, Denmark to cross Cook Strait, replacing the ageing Aramoana and Aranui. She was designed to operate at a faster service speed than the previous ferries on the route, while reducing waves that would affect nearby beaches. This reduced the crossing time by 20 minutes. It entered service on 21 December 1983.

This was the second inter-island ferry to bear the name Arahura (a Māori word meaning "Pathway to Dawn"). The earlier vessel was a twin-screw steamship built in Scotland for the Union Steamship Company in 1905. That ship served until the early 1950s and was sunk by the Royal New Zealand Air Force as target practice.

In 2008, Arahura underwent a NZ$9 million refit to better accommodate larger trucks and campervans. This included reducing some of the upper decks lowering her passenger capacity to 550 and installing a new cinema and cafeteria, greatly improving and modernising her passenger areas.

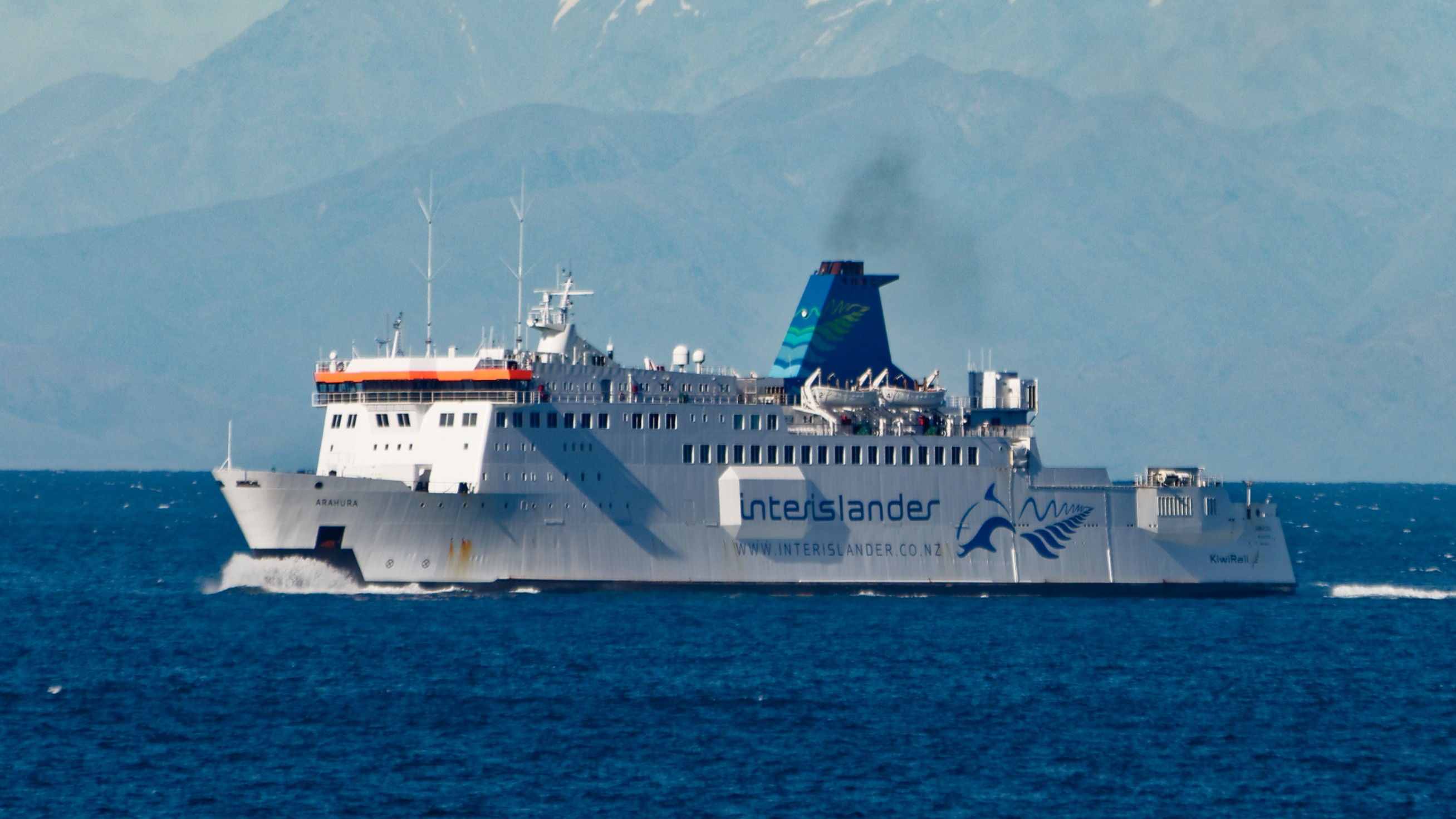
Arahura crossing Cook Strait in November 2014, showing the rear superstructure changes made, post 2008 re-fit.

In 2014, she made her 50,000th Cook Strait crossing.

In December 2014, KiwiRail announced that Arahura would be retired in 2015 after 32 years in service. Kaiārahi was chartered to replace her on the route. Arahura's last scheduled passenger voyages were on 29 July 2015, operating the 14:45 sailing to Picton and the 18:45 sailing to Wellington. The last freight journey took place over the following night. She had completed more than 52,000 crossings and 13 million km with over four million passengers carried and is remembered as a key workhorse of the Cook Strait.

On 3 October 2015, renamed Ahura and with her Interislander livery painted out, she departed Wellington, bound for the Alang in India, being beached there on 3 November.

=== Incidents ===
In 1986, Arahura helped rescue passengers from the sinking Soviet cruise liner Mikhail Lermontov, providing lifeboats and extra assistance.

On 11 April 1989, Arahura rolled to an estimated 40 degrees during a routine sailing from Picton to Wellington because of stormy conditions in Cook Strait.

In September 2001, Arahura was involved in a near miss with StraitNZ's Kent freight-only ferry in Tory Channel which "could have caused many fatalities"

In April 2005, the Arahura experienced a sudden loss of all propulsion power, just before the entrance to Tory Channel, causing the vessel to drift for a short time while systems were recovered. She eventually continued to Picton via the Northern Entrance.

=== Livery ===
Arahura changed liveries three times in her lifetime. Originally, she had a green hull and buff, red, and black on the funnel (a modified 1970s NZR logo).

In 1989, the inter-island service was re-branded as a "ferry cruise", and the livery of all the ferries was replaced with a white hull with blue and green stripes. The funnels now carried a stylized Pelorus Jack, a dolphin famous for assisting vessels navigating across the Cook Strait.

The liveries were changed again in 2004. Pelorus Jack was relocated to the hull and the funnels were now blue with a fern replacing Pelorus Jack.

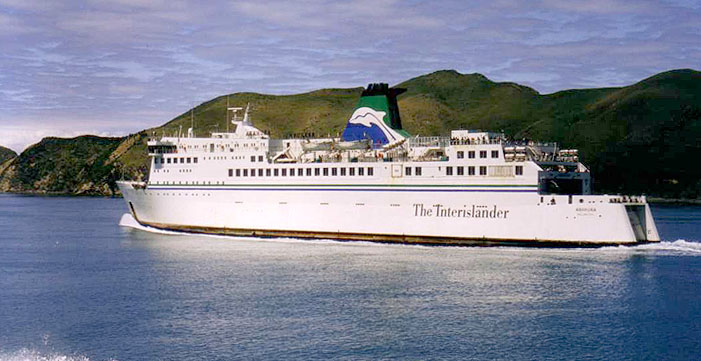
Arahura in Pelorus Jack livery in the Marlborough Sounds

== Propulsion ==
Arahura was a diesel-electric vessel. She had a fuel capacity of 450,000 litres and was built with the capability to provide power ashore for civil defence or similar emergencies providing 14 MW power - enough to light all the houses in Wellington.

== Deck layout ==
Rail and road vehicles were loaded and unloaded through the stern of the ship via a double linkspan. Passengers without vehicles boarded through a walkway on the starboard side.

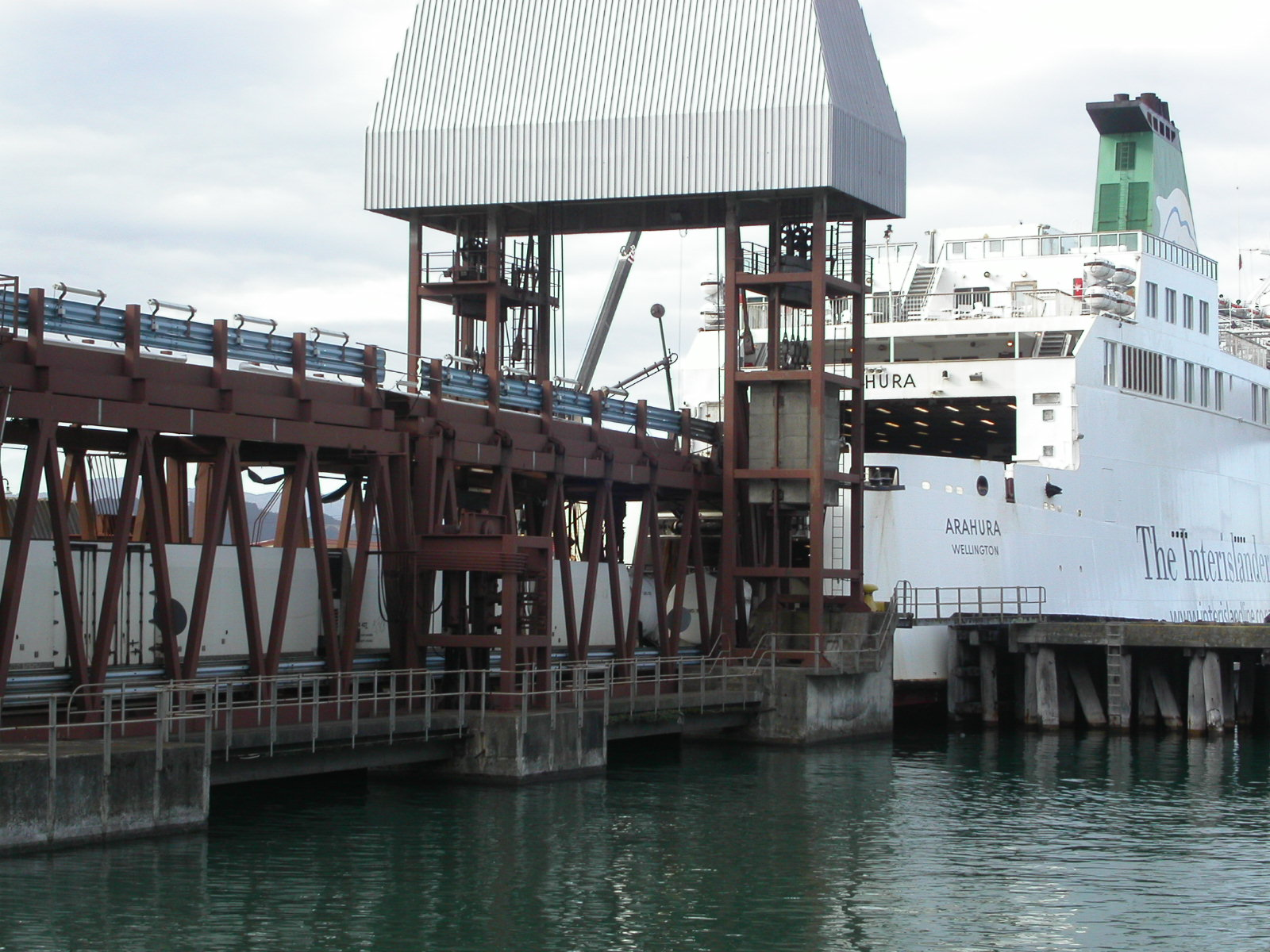
Arahura loading vehicles and rail freight at the Wellington terminal

- Decks 1 and 2 were below the waterline and contained the ship's engines, control room and other machinery.
- Deck 3 was the rail deck, which could also hold smaller motor vehicles and was often used with a few rail wagons alongside a number of cars.
- Deck 5 was the dedicated vehicle deck. After the 2008 refit, blisters were added to improve turning capabilities for trucks and more space for campervans.
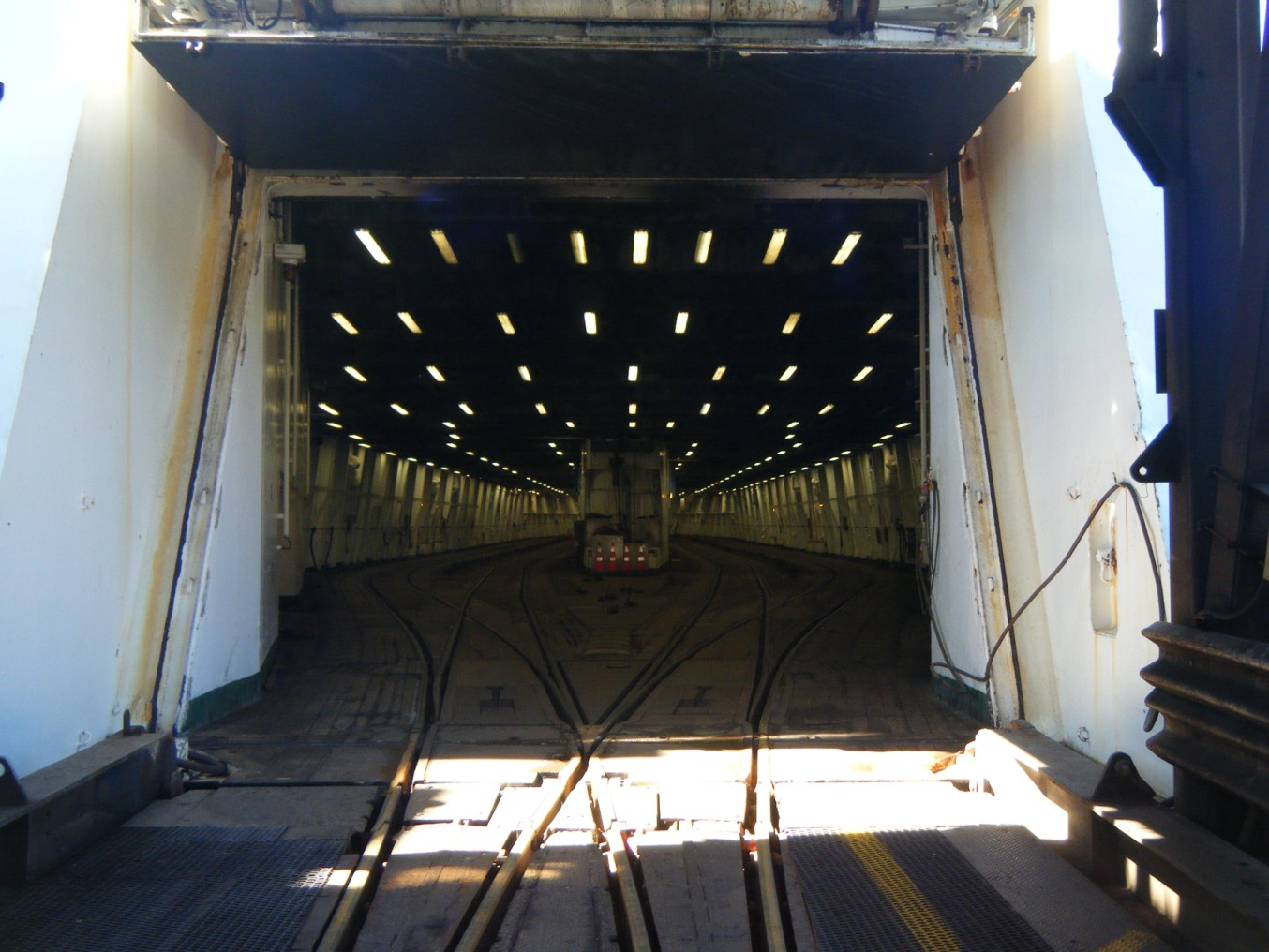
  Raildeck of Arahura, connected with the double linkspan in Wellington
- Deck 7 contained information centre and amenities, such as a play area, video arcade, food court, onboard store, a cinema, observation decks, a foot passenger gangway entrance, a Club Class private lounge, outdoor terraced seating, plus several different seating areas, and a number of crew offices.
- Deck 8 contained more passenger observation decks, a senior citizens lounge and the Queen Charlotte Cafe and Bar.
- Deck 9 housed the sophisticated bridge, helipad (on outer areas), sun decks and officers' quarters. She carried approximately 70 crew members, half of whom lived on board on a 7-day on, 7-day off roster cycle.
