= Waikawa, Marlborough =

Settlement in Marlborough, New Zealand

Waikawa
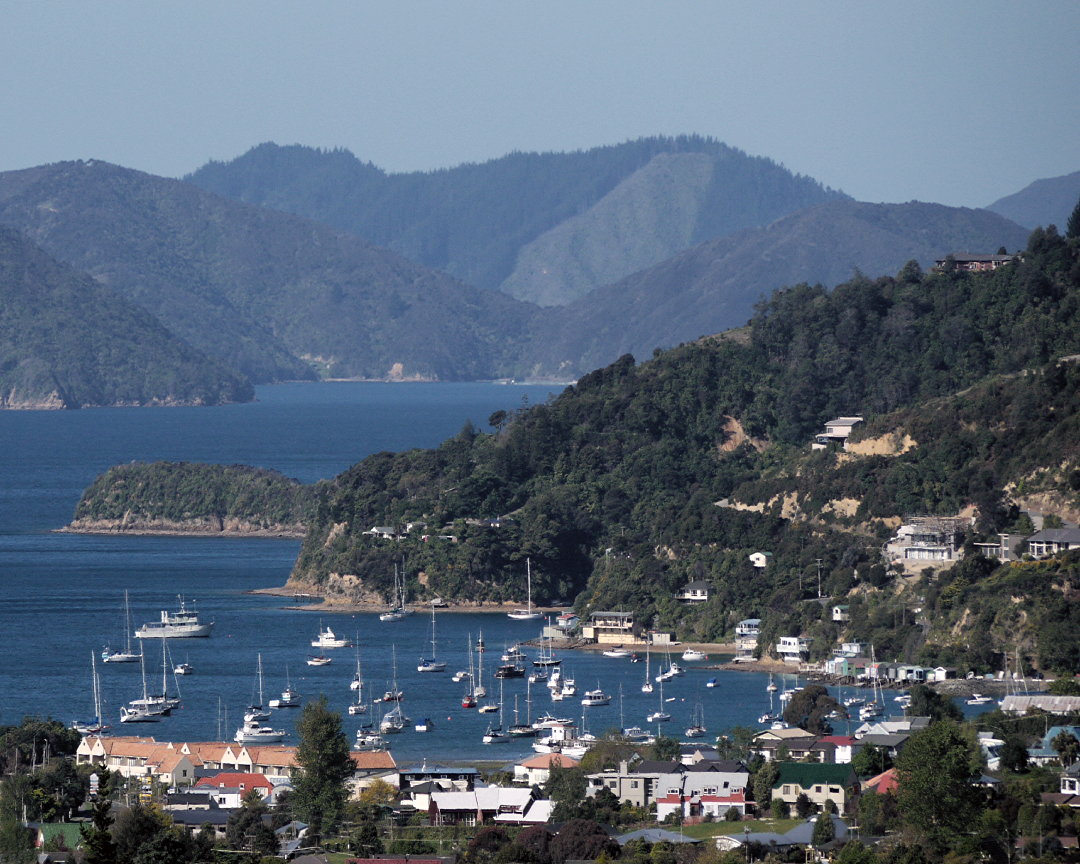
- Waikawa Bay and marina
- Interactive map of Waikawa
- Coordinates: 41°16′11″S 174°2′29″E
- Country: New Zealand
- Region: Marlborough
- Ward: Marlborough Sounds General Ward; Marlborough Māori Ward
- Electorates: Kaikōura; Te Tai Tonga (Māori)

Government
  - Territorial Authority: Marlborough District Council
  - Marlborough District Mayor: Nadine Taylor
  - Kaikōura MP: Stuart Smith
  - Te Tai Tonga MP: Tākuta Ferris

Area
  - Total: 4.32 km^{2} (1.67 sq mi)

Population (June 2025)
  - Total: 1,700
  - Density: 390/km^{2} (1,000/sq mi)

Waikawa is a small settlement to the north east of Picton, Marlborough, New Zealand. Waikawa Bay opens onto Queen Charlotte Sound.

The New Zealand Ministry for Culture and Heritage gives a translation of "bitter water" for Waikawa.

Waikawa is an important New Zealand tourist destination because its large marina acts as gateway to the Marlborough Sounds and famous treks (hikes) such as the Queen Charlotte Track.

Waikawa is host to Waikawa Marina which is one of the largest marinas in New Zealand. Waikawa Marina hosts 600 yacht berths and 70 individual lock-up boatsheds. The marina offers a typical range of modern on-site marine services, supplies, and facilities. These facilities include a café/bar and accommodation.

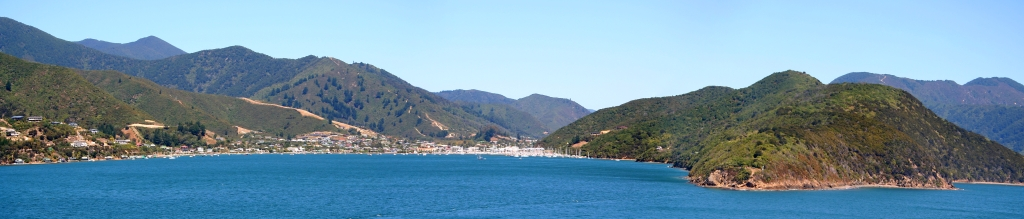
Waikawa Bay, Marlborough

== Demographics ==
Waikawa covers 4.32 km^{2} (1.67 sq mi) and had an estimated population of 1,700 as of June 2025, with a population density of 394 people per km^{2}.

Historical population
Year	Pop.	±% p.a.
2006	1,119	—
2013	1,371	+2.94%
2018	1,542	+2.38%
2023	1,659	+1.47%
The 2006 population is for a smaller area of 3.86 km^{2}. Source:

Waikawa had a population of 1,659 in the 2023 New Zealand census, an increase of 117 people (7.6%) since the 2018 census, and an increase of 288 people (21.0%) since the 2013 census. There were 819 males, 837 females, and 3 people of other genders in 726 dwellings. 1.6% of people identified as LGBTIQ+. The median age was 58.8 years (compared with 38.1 years nationally). There were 213 people (12.8%) aged under 15 years, 144 (8.7%) aged 15 to 29, 678 (40.9%) aged 30 to 64, and 624 (37.6%) aged 65 or older.

People could identify as more than one ethnicity. The results were 88.1% European (Pākehā); 17.2% Māori; 1.1% Pasifika; 2.4% Asian; 0.5% Middle Eastern, Latin American and African New Zealanders (MELAA); and 4.9% other, which includes people giving their ethnicity as "New Zealander". English was spoken by 98.4%, Māori by 4.3%, Samoan by 0.4%, and other languages by 6.5%. No language could be spoken by 1.1% (e.g. too young to talk). New Zealand Sign Language was known by 0.5%. The percentage of people born overseas was 20.1, compared with 28.8% nationally.

Religious affiliations were 30.7% Christian, 0.2% Hindu, 0.2% Islam, 1.3% Māori religious beliefs, 0.4% Buddhist, 0.2% New Age, and 1.3% other religions. People who answered that they had no religion were 59.0%, and 7.1% of people did not answer the census question.

Of those at least 15 years old, 258 (17.8%) people had a bachelor's or higher degree, 837 (57.9%) had a post-high school certificate or diploma, and 357 (24.7%) people exclusively held high school qualifications. The median income was $36,700, compared with $41,500 nationally. 141 people (9.8%) earned over $100,000 compared to 12.1% nationally. The employment status of those at least 15 was 570 (39.4%) full-time, 201 (13.9%) part-time, and 21 (1.5%) unemployed.

== Education ==
Waikawa Bay School is a coeducational contributing primary (years 1–6) school with a roll of 144 students as of July 2026.

Waikawa Pa School was a native school, opened in 1877. It burnt down in 1928. Waikawa Bay School opened in 1929, with a temporary school in the interim.
