= GMV Aramoana =

New Zealand train ferry

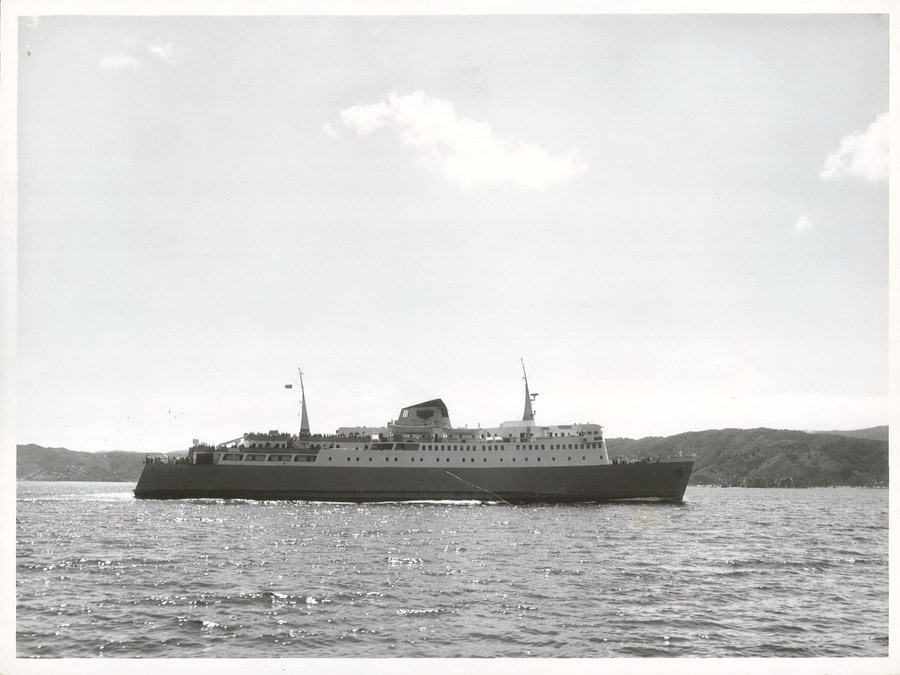
- GMV Aramoana in Wellington Harbour, 1965

History
- Name: Aramoana
- Namesake: Māori: Sea Pathway
- Route: Wellington - Picton
- Builder: William Denny & Brothers, Dumbarton
- Cost: $NZ 4 million
- Yard number: 1502
- Launched: 24 November 1961
- Completed: 1961
- In service: 13 August 1962
- Identification: IMO number: 5021671
- Fate: Laid up 1983, sold 1984; Scrapped at Alang in 1994

General characteristics
- Tonnage: 4,160 GRT
- Length: 112.2 m (368 ft)
- Beam: 18.6 m (61 ft)
- Draught: 4.73 m (15.5 ft)
- Installed power: 6 × English Electric 16CSVM diesel engine
- Propulsion: 4 x electric drive motors, 2 per shaft
- Speed: 19 knots (22 mph)
- Capacity: 788 passengers; 30 rail wagons; 70 motor cars
- Crew: 90

GMV Aramoana (a Māori-language word meaning sea pathway) was a roll-on/roll-off train ferry operating across Cook Strait between 1962 and 1983.

== History ==
Government Motor Vessel (GMV) Aramoana was built in 1961 for the New Zealand Railways Department to link the North and South Island rail networks. She was the last vessel built by William Denny & Brothers, Dumbarton, on the River Clyde. She arrived from Scotland on 26 July 1962 and entered service on 13 August. In 1965, she was joined by the similar, but slightly larger, Aranui.

== Layout ==
A combined vehicle deck could carry 70 cars and 30 rail wagons on three tracks.

== Service ==
Aramoana was built to provide a railway service between the North and South Islands of New Zealand, later known as the Interislander. Initially she provided one round trip per day (except Sunday). In her first year of service she carried 207,000 passengers, 46,000 cars and 181,000 tonnes of cargo. This was substantially more than its predecessor, the Union Steam Ship Company's ferry Tamahine, which had carried 60,000 passengers, 11,000 cars and 14,000 tonnes of cargo in the final year of service.

In 1965, she was joined by the similar, but slightly larger, Aranui.

On 10 April 1968 Aramoana was the largest of the rescue vessels when TEV Wahine, a New Zealand inter-island ferry of the Union Company, foundered after striking Barrett Reef at the entrance to Wellington Harbour. Aramoana's two motor lifeboats were lost in the very heavy seas.

In July 1977 Aramoana left Wellington to be rebuilt by Sembawang Shipyard in Singapore to carry 800 passengers to meet the increased traffic, following the withdrawal in 1976 of the Union Company's Wellington to Lyttelton service. It re-entered service in December 1977.

In 1983, both Aramoana and Aranui were replaced by the significantly larger Arahura and were sold to the Najd Trading & Construction Company of Jeddah, Saudi Arabia in 1984. Aramoana was renamed Captain Nicolas V, and renamed Najd II the following year.

In 1985 she carried Muslim pilgrims on the Red Sea.

On 16 July 1992, the Najd II, took on board 240 Chinese illegal immigrants from a beach at Thailand destined for the USA. Sailing east instead the shorter western route they limped to the coast of Africa before finally stopping at Mombasa, Kenya, in September 1992. By then the ship was in too poor a condition to continue and the immigrants eventually were transferred to a second smuggling vessel, the Golden Venture which beached near New York on 6 June 1993.

Aramoana was laid up at the United Arab Emirates port of Ajman in 1993. In 1994 she left Ajman towed by a tug and was broken up on Alang beach on the western shore of the Gulf of Khambhat in India.
