= MV Aratika =

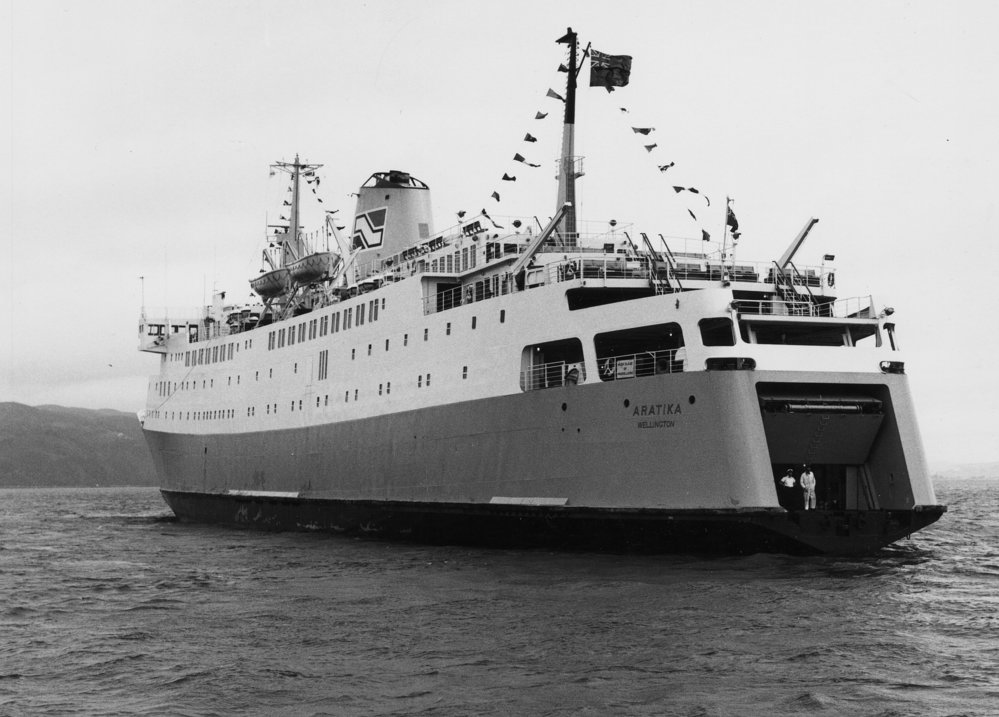
- Aratika following her 1976 refit

History
- Name: MV Aratika
- Route: Wellington - Picton
- Builder: Chantiers Dubigeon, Nantes
- Cost: $NZ 8.8 million
- Yard number: 138
- Launched: 8 November 1973
- In service: 1974
- Out of service: 1999
- Identification: IMO number: 7347835
- Fate: Sold to MBRS Lines as MV Virgin Mary in the Philippines in 1999. Scrapped in 2008

General characteristics
- Class & type: Roll-on/roll-off, train ferry
- Tonnage: 9,035 GT (prior to refit)
- Displacement: 4,089 net tons (prior to refit)
- Length: 127.7 m (419 ft)
- Beam: 18.7 m (61 ft)
- Draft: 5.09 m (16.7 ft)
- Propulsion: 2 x SEMT Pielstick
- Capacity: 840 passengers (originally 10), 70 cars (originally 4), rail wagons

MV Aratika was a roll-on/roll-off train ferry that operated on the Interislander between Wellington and Picton in New Zealand from 1974 until 1999.

Aratika is a Māori-language word meaning direct path.

== History ==
Aratika was built by Chantiers Dubigeon in France for the New Zealand Railways Department to operate between Wellington and Picton. She was built to carry rail freight only. Launched in November 1973, the ship arrived in Wellington in June 1974.

In 1976 she was converted by Hongkong United Dockyards to carry passengers and private vehicles as well as railway wagons. This increased her weight by 800 tonnes, passenger capacity from 10 to 840, and the car space from four to 70.

During her 25 years of service, the vessel completed 27,265 crossings and traveled an overall distance of 1,400,000 miles (2,300,000 km).

In 1999, she was sold to MBRS Lines in the Philippines and served as MV Virgin Mary until 2008, when she was sold to Indian ship-breakers.
