= Arahanga =

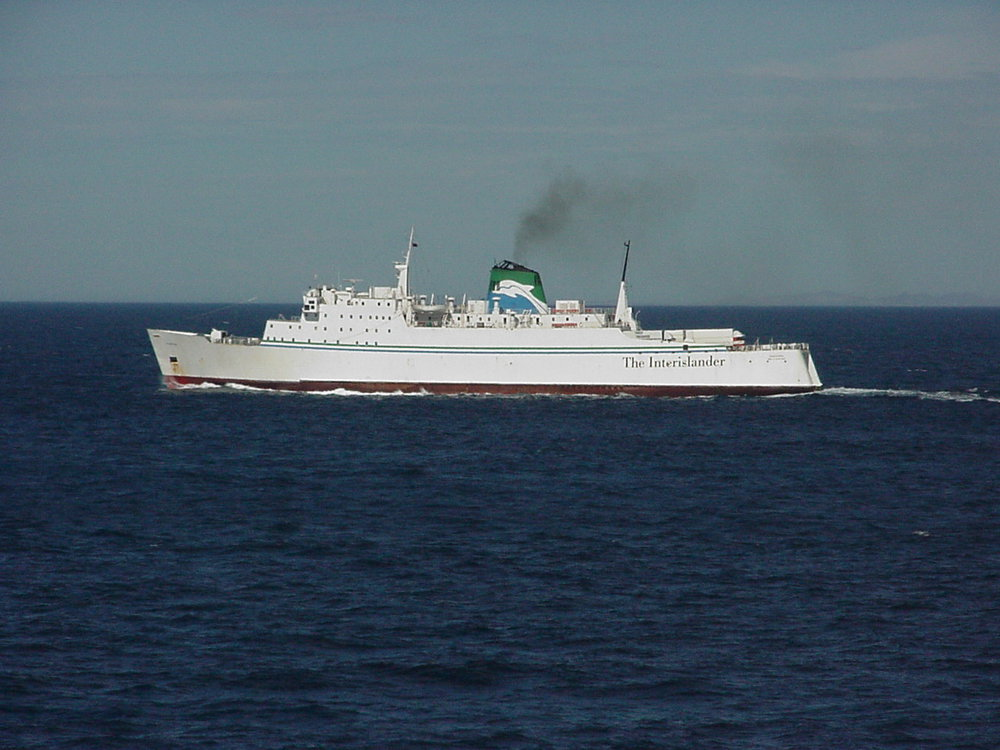

History
- Name: Arahanga
- Operator: New Zealand Railways Department, New Zealand Railways Corporation, Tranz Rail
- Route: Wellington - Picton
- Builder: Upper Clyde Shipbuilders, Glasgow
- Yard number: 111
- Launched: 27 July 1972
- In service: 11 December 1972
- Out of service: 27 March 2001
- Fate: Scrapped

General characteristics
- Class & type: Roll-on/roll-off, train ferry
- Tonnage: 3,893 GRT
- Length: 127.4 metres
- Beam: 18.3 metres
- Draught: 4.8 metres
- Propulsion: 2 x SEMT Pielstick
- Speed: 17 knots
- Capacity: 40 (Original) 100 (1989)

Arahanga was a roll-on/roll-off train ferry that operated across the Cook Strait between Wellington and Picton in New Zealand from 1972 until 2001.

== History ==
Arahanga was built by Upper Clyde Shipbuilders, Glasgow for the New Zealand Railways Department to operate across the Cook Strait between Wellington and Picton. Upper Clyde Shipbuilders went into liquidation during its construction, delaying its completion by 10 months. It was the last ship built at the John Brown & Company yard. Launched on 27 January 1972, it arrived in Wellington on 22 November 1972 and entered service on 11 December 1972.

It was built as a cargo ferry with four tracks for railway wagons and additional capacity for road trucks. Built to only carry 40 passengers, it was refitted in 1984 to carry 100. After 32,662 voyages, it was withdrawn on 27 March 2001 and sold to Alang, India for scrapping.
