= Jumboization =

Maritime construction technique

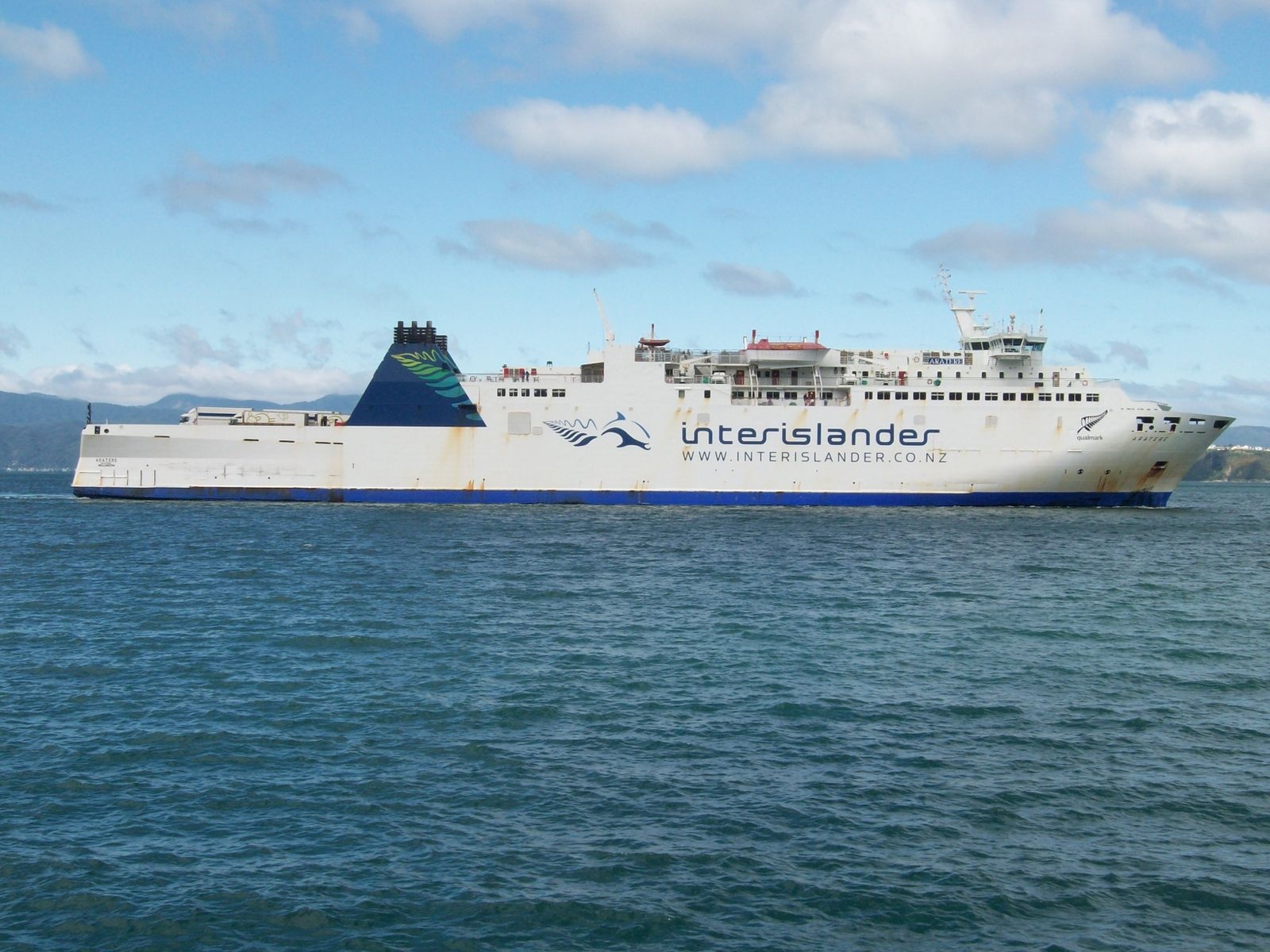

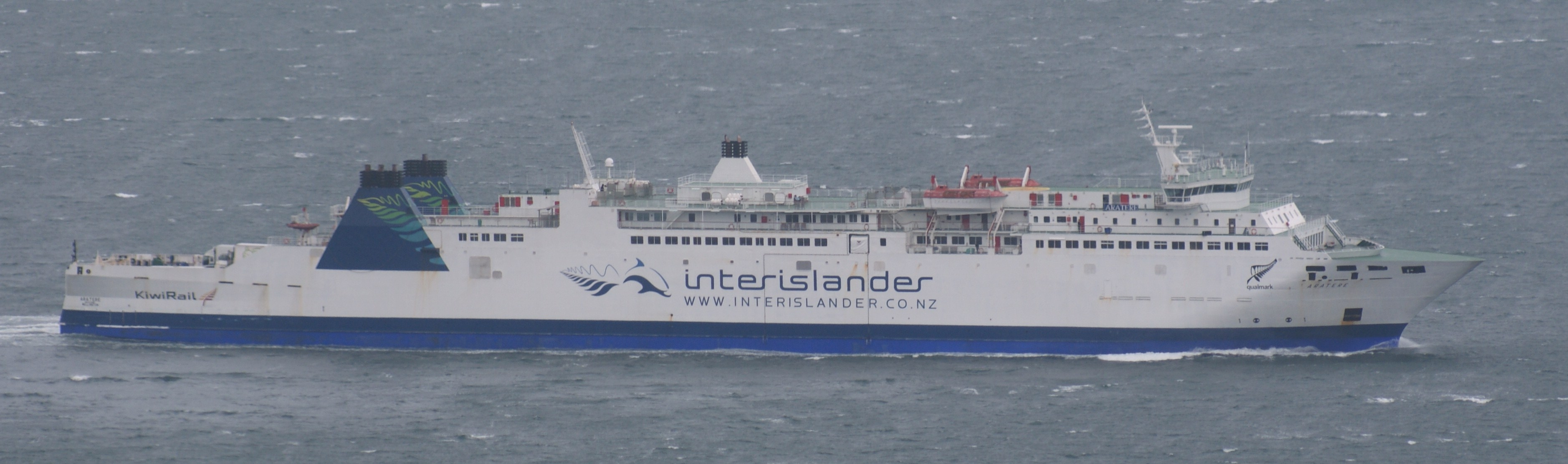
Aratere before (top) and after (bottom) jumboization - note the distance between the lifeboats and main funnels.

Jumboization, also known as stretching, is a technique in shipbuilding consisting of enlarging a ship by adding an entire section to it. By contrast with refitting or installation of equipment, jumboization is a long and complex endeavour which can require a specialized shipyard.

Enlarging a ship by jumboization allows an increase in its capacity and revenue potential without needing to purchase or build an entirely new ship. This technique has been used on cruise ships and tankers, as well as smaller vessels like sailing or fishing ships.

== Methods ==
Large ships often have a long midsection with a uniform profile. In such cases, the ship is cut in two pieces and an additional section is inserted in between. This operation must be performed in a drydock.

On large ships, the additional sections are typically 20 to 30 metres long, consisting of an oil tank, a cargo ship hold, or a group of cabins, depending on the type of ship. The tanker Seawise Giant became the largest ship in the world after her jumboization.

Smaller ships are usually jumboized by replacing the entire bow or stern section of the ship. This is done because the shape of their hull is usually incompatible with the previous method.

This technique was also used on USS George Washington, the United States Navy's first ballistic missile submarine. Initially built as an attack submarine, a new section containing missile tubes were inserted after construction had already begun. Later members of this class were built from the start with the missile section.

This strategy can also be used on aircraft. For example, 270 already-built Lockheed C-141A Starlifters had additional sections inserted before and after the wings. This is different from aircraft models which are "stretched" during the design and manufacturing process.

== See also ==
- List of stretched cruise ships
