= Picton, New Zealand =

Town in Marlborough, New Zealand

Picton Waitohi (Māori)
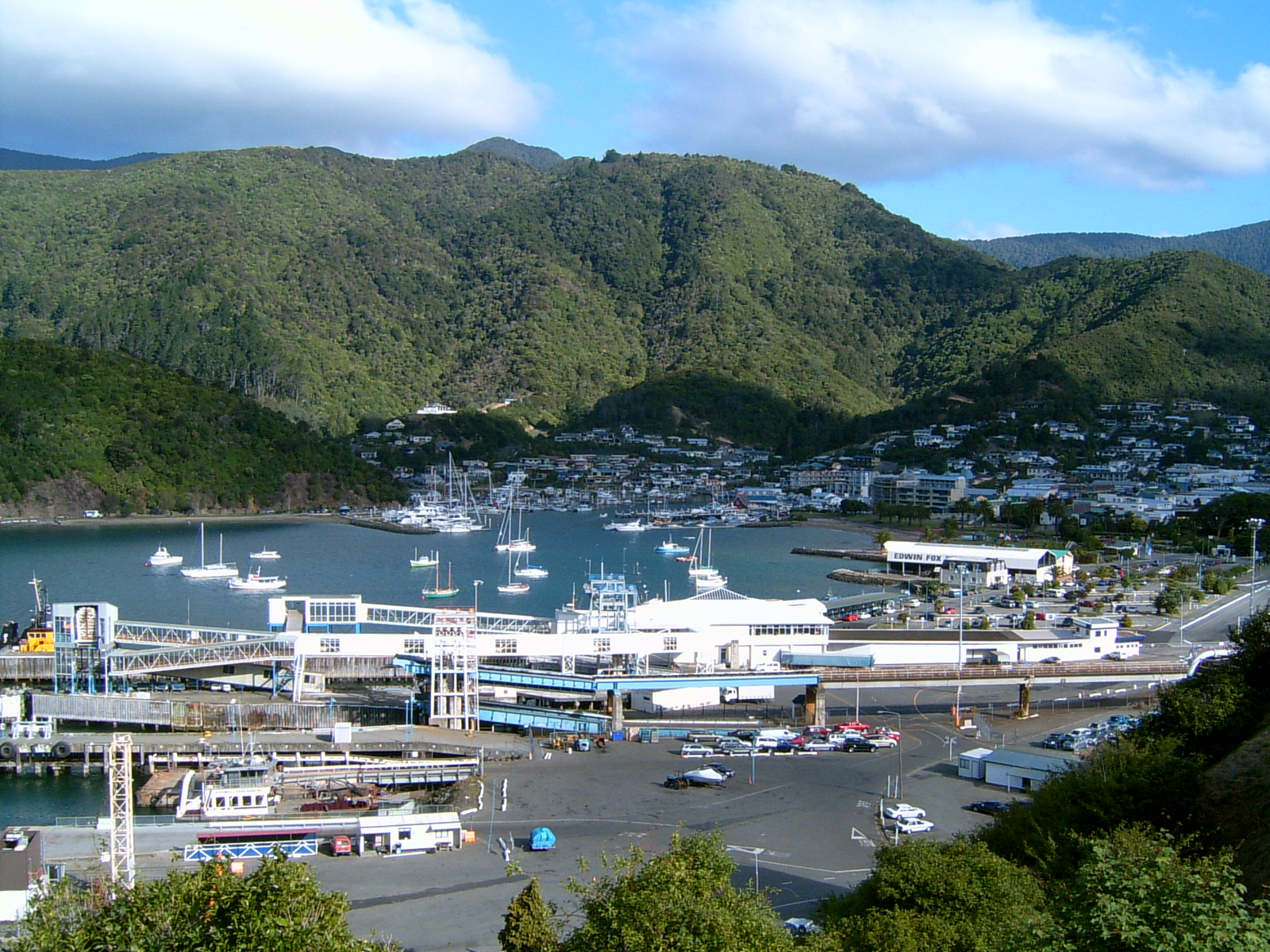
- A view of the harbour in Picton
- Interactive map of Picton
- Coordinates: 41°17′34″S 174°0′21″E
- Country: New Zealand
- Region: Marlborough
- Ward: Marlborough Sounds General Ward; Marlborough Māori Ward
- Electorates: Kaikōura; Te Tai Tonga (Māori)

Government
  - Territorial Authority: Marlborough District Council
  - Marlborough District Mayor: Nadine Taylor
  - Kaikōura MP: Stuart Smith
  - Te Tai Tonga MP: Mananui Ramsden

Area
  - Total: 9.64 km^{2} (3.72 sq mi)

Population (June 2025)
  - Total: 4,850
  - Density: 503/km^{2} (1,300/sq mi)
- Postcode(s): 7220

Picton (Māori: Waitohi) is a town in the Marlborough Region of New Zealand's South Island. The town is located near the head of the Queen Charlotte Sound / Tōtaranui, 25 km (16 mi) north of Blenheim and 65 km (40 mi) west of Wellington. Waikawa lies just north-east of Picton and is considered to be a contiguous part of the Picton urban area.

Picton is a major hub in New Zealand's transport network, connecting the South Island road and rail network with ferries across Cook Strait to Wellington and the North Island. The Picton urban area has a population of 4,850 (June 2025), making it the second-largest town in the Marlborough Region behind Blenheim. It is the easternmost town in the South Island with a population of at least 1,000 people.

== Toponymy ==
The town is named after Sir Thomas Picton, the Welsh military associate of the Duke of Wellington, who was killed at the Battle of Waterloo.

Thomas Picton's connection to the slave trade and controversial governorship of Trinidad has resulted in calls for places named after him to be renamed.

The town's Māori name, Waitohi, translates into English as 'waters of the tohi ritual'. The tohi is a baptismal ritual of warriors before they went into battle. The warriors would line the bank of the sacred stream, and as they filed past, the tohunga (chosen experts) dipped a branch of karamū bush into the stream, striking each warrior on the right shoulder. The tohi rite was last performed on soldiers of the 28th Māori Battalion during World War II.

== History ==
Prior to European settlement, the Te Atiawa o Te Waka-a-Māui iwi occupied Waitohi Pā on the site of the present town. In March 1850, Sir George Grey and Sir Francis Dillon purchased the land from Te Āti Awa, who moved to neighbouring Waikawa Bay. In 1859, the Marlborough Province was created and the newly named Picton became the provincial capital. The provincial capital was moved to Blenheim in 1865.

Author Katherine Mansfield spent time in Picton, where her grandparents, Arthur and Mary Beauchamp, and her father Harold, lived for some time when they came from Australia. She included a reference to the port in her short story "The Voyage" (in the collection The Garden Party), which is "an account of a trip to Picton from Wellington on the Cook Strait ferry".

The roll-on/roll-off (RORO) road and rail ferry service between Picton and Wellington started on 11 August 1962, operated by the New Zealand Railways Department with the ship GMV Aramoana.

== Geography ==
Picton is located in an inlet known as Picton Harbour, on the true right (south) side of the upper Queen Charlotte Sound / Tōtaranui. Picton Harbour is flanked to the west by Wedge Point, which separates it from Grove Arm, and to the east by The Snout, which separates it from Waikawa Bay. Within the harbour, Kaipupu Point splits the inlet into two, Picton Harbour proper to the east and Shakespeare Bay to the west.

The main town is located on flat to rolling land at the head of Picton Harbour. Waitohi River starts in Essons Valley and passes through the town, draining into the sound near the ferry terminal. The township extends northeast along rolling land towards Waikawa Bay, separated from Picton Harbour by The Snout and Victoria Domain.

On the land side, Picton is surrounded by hills and mountains, including Te Tara-o-Te-Marama/Mount Freeth to the west, the Robertson Range to the south and Mount McCormick to the east. The Elevation Saddle connects southwest of the town with the Tuamarina River valley and contains the main land transport routes between Picton and the rest of the South Island.

== Demographics ==
Picton, including Waikawa, is described by Stats NZ as a small urban area, which covers 9.64 km^{2} (3.72 sq mi). It had an estimated population of 4,850 as of June 2025, with a population density of 503 people per km^{2}.

Historical population
Year	Pop.	±% p.a.
2006	4,047	—
2013	4,125	+0.27%
2018	4,587	+2.15%
2023	4,812	+0.96%
The 2006 population is for a smaller area of 9.17 km^{2}. Source:

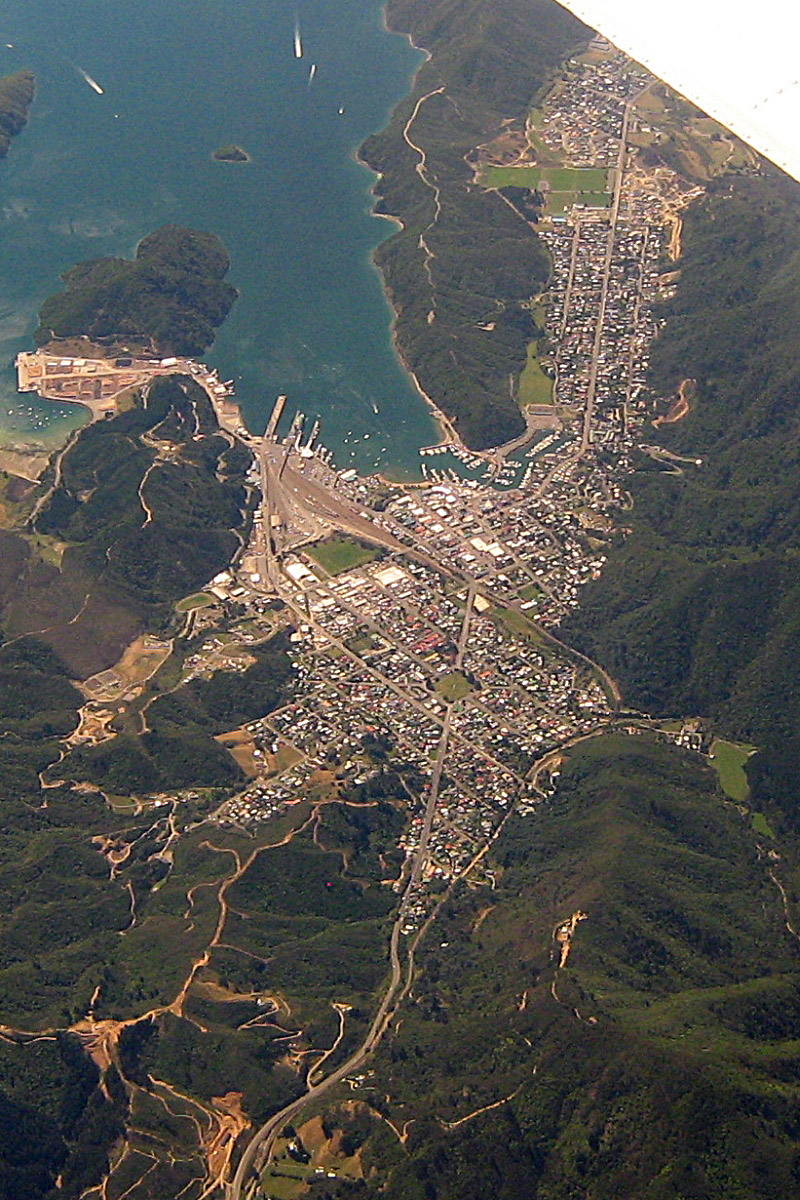
Picton from the air

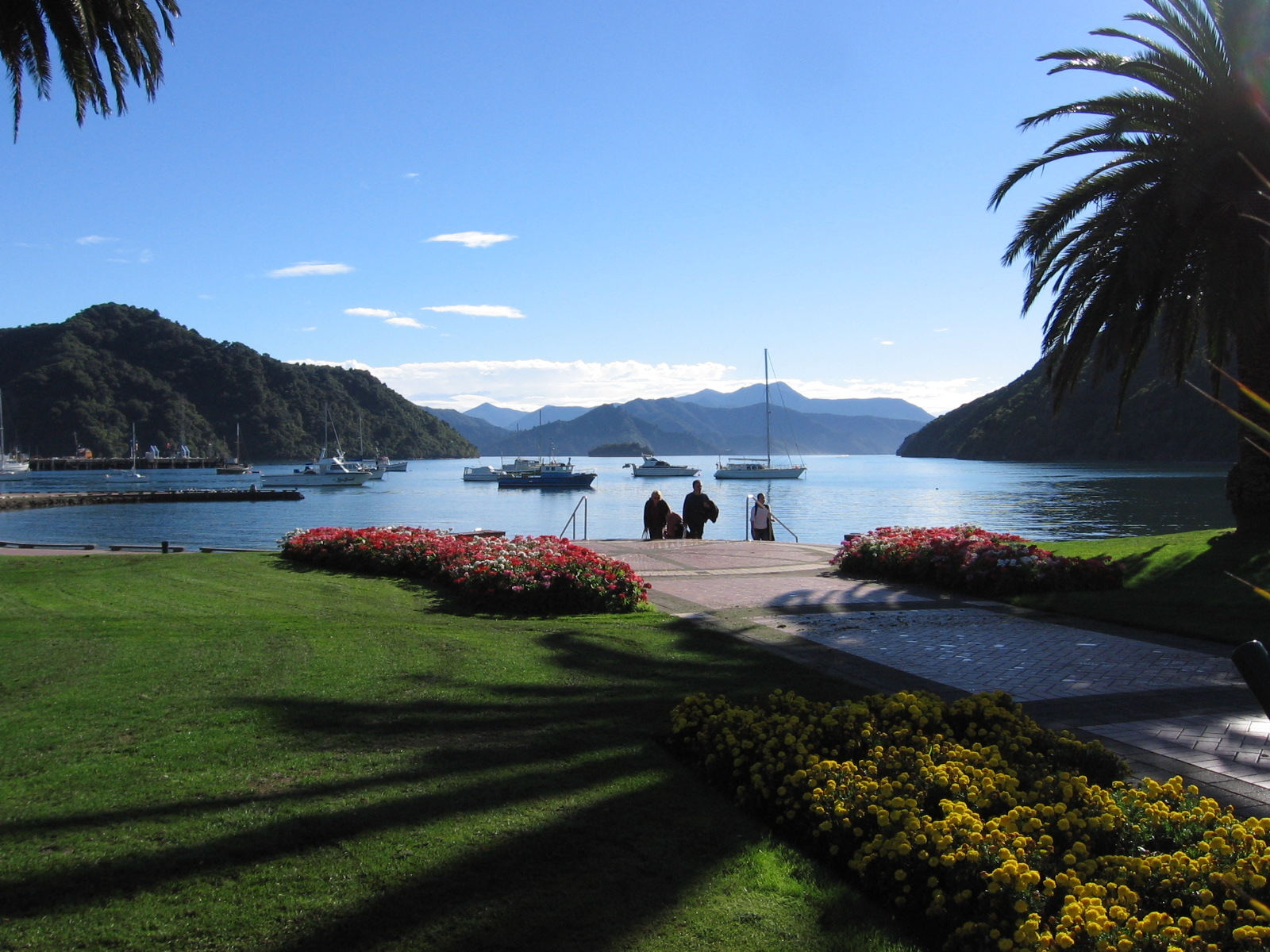
Picton, a park at the coast

Picton had a population of 4,812 in the 2023 New Zealand census, an increase of 225 people (4.9%) since the 2018 census, and an increase of 687 people (16.7%) since the 2013 census. There were 2,406 males, 2,391 females, and 15 people of other genders in 2,154 dwellings. 2.4% of people identified as LGBTIQ+. The median age was 56.0 years (compared with 38.1 years nationally). There were 615 people (12.8%) aged under 15 years, 534 (11.1%) aged 15 to 29, 2,085 (43.3%) aged 30 to 64, and 1,575 (32.7%) aged 65 or older.

People could identify as more than one ethnicity. The results were 86.3% European (Pākehā); 21.0% Māori; 2.3% Pasifika; 3.3% Asian; 0.4% Middle Eastern, Latin American and African New Zealanders (MELAA); and 4.0% other, which includes people giving their ethnicity as "New Zealander". English was spoken by 98.4%, Māori by 5.0%, Samoan by 0.4%, and other languages by 6.5%. No language could be spoken by 1.2% (e.g. too young to talk). New Zealand Sign Language was known by 0.4%. The percentage of people born overseas was 18.9, compared with 28.8% nationally.

Religious affiliations were 29.7% Christian, 0.6% Hindu, 0.1% Islam, 1.4% Māori religious beliefs, 0.5% Buddhist, 0.4% New Age, and 0.8% other religions. People who answered that they had no religion were 58.4%, and 8.2% of people did not answer the census question.

Of those at least 15 years old, 612 (14.6%) people had a bachelor's or higher degree, 2,385 (56.8%) had a post-high school certificate or diploma, and 1,194 (28.4%) people exclusively held high school qualifications. The median income was $34,000, compared with $41,500 nationally. 267 people (6.4%) earned over $100,000 compared to 12.1% nationally. The employment status of those at least 15 was 1,761 (42.0%) full-time, 627 (14.9%) part-time, and 87 (2.1%) unemployed.

Individual statistical areas
Name	Area (km^{2})	Population	Density (per km^{2})	Dwellings	Median age	Median income
Waikawa	4.32	1,659	384	726	58.8 years	$36,700
Waitohi	5.31	3,153	594	1,428	54.4 years	$32,600
New Zealand					38.1 years	$41,500

== Economy ==
Picton's economy is largely influenced by its status as a major transport hub, in addition to servicing tourists and residents in the Queen Charlotte Sound. At the 2018 census, the three largest industries (ANZSIC divisions) of employment for Picton residents were accommodation and food services, transport postal and warehousing, and retail trade.

== Governance ==
The Picton Borough Council was established in 1876 to govern the town. The borough council was abolished as part of the 1989 local government reforms, and Picton became part of the Marlborough District. For electoral purposes, Picton is part of the Marlborough Sounds ward, which elects three of the council's thirteen councillors.

At the national level, Picton is part of the Kaikōura general electorate and Te Tai Tonga Māori electorate.

== Marae ==
Waikawa Marae is located in Picton. It is the marae (meeting ground) of Te Atiawa o Te Waka-a-Māui, and includes the Arapaoa wharenui (meeting house).

In October 2020, the Government committed $242,386 from the Provincial Growth Fund to upgrade the marae, creating 18 jobs.

== Attractions ==
The town is also the usual starting point for holidays in the Marlborough Sounds. Highlights include fishing, walking, the Queen Charlotte Track, and diving. A popular dive trip is to the 177-metre long wreck of the cruise liner MS Mikhail Lermontov, which lies at Port Gore, 37 metres underwater. Dive charter boats leave from Picton for the last resting place of the Mikhail Lermontov, one of the world's largest, most accessible and most recent shipwrecks. Guiding is essential as the 1986 wreck is in 30 metres of water and divers can become disoriented inside the hull, which lies on its starboard side.

The completion of the highway link south ended the relative isolation of this scenic area in the 1950s and encouraged modern motels, beginning with the American Luxury Motels, and many more after the ferry service to Wellington began.

Other dive sites in the Picton region include Fish Reserve, the Koi wreck, and Long Island Marine Reserve. Introductory dives (discover scuba dive) and PADI (Professional Association of Diving Instructors) certification courses from open water diver to dive master are available from Picton. Technical diving and TDI (Technical Diving International) courses can be completed in Picton, diving in the Marlborough Sounds.

The Edwin Fox Maritime Centre features the remains of the Edwin Fox, the only surviving ship that transported convicts to Australia, and a small museum.

== Infrastructure ==
=== Transport ===
State Highway 1 links Picton southwards to Blenheim, Kaikōura, Christchurch and beyond, while the scenic Queen Charlotte Drive (shorter in distance but usually slower than via State Highways 1, 62 and 6) winds westward to Havelock.

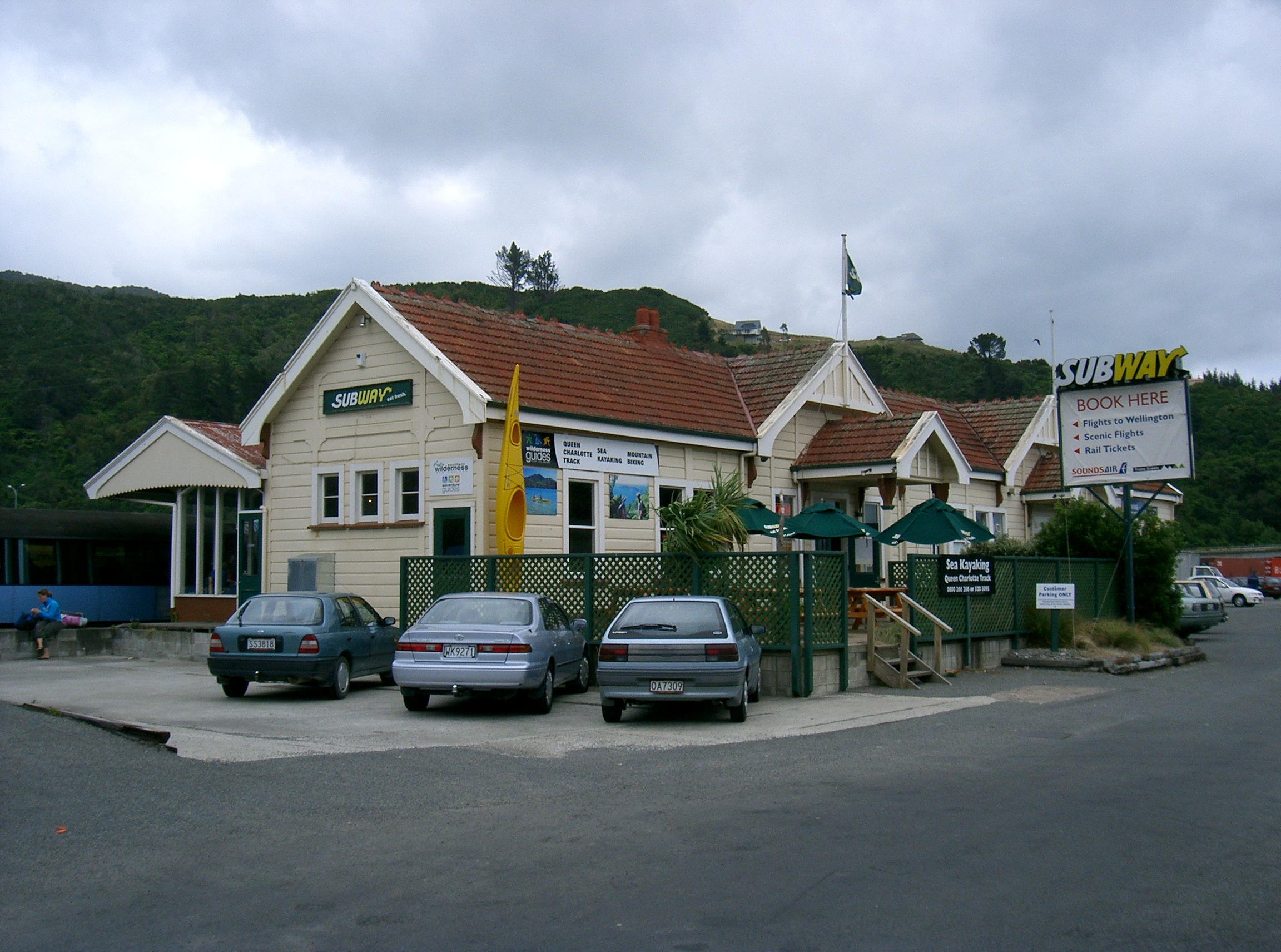
Picton Railway Station in 2006.

The Main North Line railway opened on 17 November 1875 between Picton and the Ōpaoa River just north of Blenheim (the bridge over the river wasn't completed until 1880). The full line south to Kaikōura and on to Christchurch wasn't completed until 15 December 1945. The line's climb from Picton to Elevation Saddle required a steep 1-in-37 (2.7%) grade and a viaduct across the Waitohi River. The original viaduct was the largest wooden structure in the southern hemisphere at the time of its completion and lasted until 1963, when it was replaced by the current concrete and steel structure. The original Picton railway station was located on London Quay; the platform still exists, bisected by the Memorial Archway steps. The current station on Auckland Street was completed in 1914. It is a standard class B station, of weatherboard and tile, and has been listed NZHPT Category II since 1991. The Coastal Pacific long-distance passenger/tourist train from Christchurch made a daily return trip to Picton during the summer months until its scheduled passenger services were suspended in December 2021. They are scheduled to restart in November 2022.

Roll-on/roll-off (RORO) ferries link Picton with Wellington, forming the main link between the North and South Islands across Cook Strait. The two main shipping companies operating this route are the Interislander and StraitNZ, with both taking passenger and road vehicles and, for the Interislander on one ferry, rail wagons. There have been proposals in recent years (the latest in 2011) to relocate the ferry terminals from Picton to Clifford Bay, south of Blenheim, to reduce travel times. However, these plans never got past the design proposal and were eventually dropped. In 2019, consultation began on a redevelopment of the ferry precinct ahead of Interislander introducing new and larger ferries in 2024. Following the 2023 New Zealand general election, the ferry replacement project and its associated terminal redevelopments were cancelled by the incoming Sixth National Government. The Interislander terminal building originally built in the 1960s was demolished in 2024.

Cruise ships regularly visit Picton between October and April. During the 2018–19 season, 44 ships carrying 85,000 passengers visited Picton.

Picton Aerodrome at Koromiko 7.4 kilometres (4.6 mi) to the south of the town has regular services to Wellington with Sounds Air and charter flights around the Marlborough Sounds.

=== Electricity ===
The Picton Borough Council established the town's first electricity supply in September 1917. Electricity was generated by a Pelton wheel on the Waitohi River, which was later supplemented by suction gas engines, and was reticulated to customers using a 230/460-volt three-wire DC system. The Marlborough Electric Power Board (MEPB) took control of the town supply in 1947. Between 1947 and 1950, the town was re-reticulated with the national standard of 230/400 volts three-phase AC, and a 33,000-volt line was built from Picton to Springlands in Blenheim to connect the town with the rest of the MEPB's distribution network. Today, Marlborough Lines (the successor to the MEPB) owns and operates the distribution network in Picton and the wider Marlborough region.

=== Water supply and sanitation ===
Picton's main water supply is from a bore at Speeds Road in Koromiko; during high demand, this is supplemented by a stream-fed supply in Essons Valley. The average daily water demand in the town is 3,800 m^{3} (130,000 cu ft), with demand in summer peaking at 5,770 m^{3} (204,000 cu ft).

Prior to the commissioning of the Picton wastewater treatment plant in 1999, all the town's sewage was discharge raw into Queen Charlotte Sound. The town's wastewater system was upgraded in 2017, with a replacement main along Waikawa Road between Waikawa and central Picton and a bypass treatment plant to treat excess sewage that can't be processed at the main treatment plant.

== Education ==
The first school in Picton opened in 1861 at the corner of Devon Street and Broadway. A new school opened in 1882, and part of the old school was moved to the new site, but was destroyed by fire in 1928. A Catholic Convent school opened in 1915, and was replaced by St Joseph's in 1924. St Joseph's closed in 2017 due to a declining school roll.

There was no secondary education provision (Years 9 to 13) in Picton prior to 1965, with secondary school students from Picton commuting to Marlborough College in Blenheim (split into Marlborough Boys' College and Marlborough Girls' College in 1963). Queen Charlotte College opened to serve the town in 1965, while also taking over the town's intermediate school provision (Years 7 and 8) from Picton and Waikawa Bay schools.

Today, Picton has three schools:

- Picton School is a state contributing primary (Year 1 to 6) school with a roll of approximately 121 July 2026 students. It opened in 1861.
- Queen Charlotte College is a state Year 7 to 13 secondary school. It has a roll of approximately 356 students. It opened in 1965.
- Waikawa Bay School is a state contributing primary (Year 1 to 6) school in Waikawa with a roll of approximately 144 students. It opened in 1929, but with a predecessor, Waikawa Pa School, from 1877.

== Media ==
Seven Blenheim FM radio stations (The Hits, Life FM, Magic, More FM, The Breeze, Rhema, and Brian FM) are rebroadcast in Picton via a relay transmitter atop Mount Freeth west of the town. The town can also receive AM radio broadcasts from Wellington.

A private television translator was built in 1964 on Mount Freeth west of the town, relaying WNTV1 (now part of TVNZ 1) from Wellington. The translator was taken over by BCNZ in 1975 and upgraded to relay colour transmissions (introduced in 1973) and a second channel, Television Two (now TVNZ 2). The translator was decommissioned after analogue switch-off in April 2013. Since then, television in Picton is broadcast exclusively via satellite (Freeview or Sky).

== Notable people ==
- Judith Adams – Australian politician
- Lance Cairns – All-rounder for the New Zealand cricket team
- Chris Cairns – Cricketer
- Kip Colvey – Professional footballer with Colorado Rapids and the New Zealand men's national football team
- Bruno Julio Dalliessi – Elected mayor in 1966, heavyweight boxing champion in 1955 and 1957, footballer with Marlborough Rugby Union
- Nigel Hutchinson – Film producer and television commercial director
- Tony Johnson – New Zealand rugby broadcaster
- Nelle Scanlan – Best-selling New Zealand novelist of the 1930s
- Joseph Sullivan – Double Sculls Gold Medalist at the London 2012 Olympic Games
- William Henry Woodgate – Last person hanged in Marlborough

== See also ==
- StraitNZ
