= Verolme Cork Dockyards =

Defunct Irish shipyard

Coordinates: 51°50′53″N 8°19′22″W

- The slipways of Verolme Cork Dockyards
- Industry: Shipbuilding
- Founded: 1853
- Founder: Joseph Wheeler
- Defunct: 1984
- Fate: Bankrupt
- Headquarters: Rushbrooke, Co. Cork, Ireland
- Number of employees: 1 500 (1970s)
- Parent: Verolme

Verolme Cork Dockyards was a shipbuilder located on the banks of Cork Harbour in Rushbrooke, Co. Cork, Ireland.

== History ==
The docks were founded in 1853 by Joseph Wheeler as the Rushbrooke Repair Yard. In 1959 it was taken over by the Dutch company Verolme Verenigde Scheepswerven, and renamed to Verolme Cork Dockyard. The yard specialised in shipbuilding and repair, as well as the manufacture of offshore oil platform modules.

As revealed in state papers, in 1983 the Irish government received a consultant's report concluding that that the shipyard was not commercially viable. The company had been profitable until 1978, but it suffered greatly from the crisis that struck the global shipbuilding industry from the mid-1970s. It had no prospect of securing foreign or domestic orders due to its low productivity and high prices. In May 1983, John Bruton, Minister for Industry and Energy, recommended at a Cabinet meeting that the government cease placing orders with the yard for patrol boats or fishing vessels, as there was no need for new ships. The shipyard could only survive with massive public subsidies, which would constitute a considerable waste of public funds. The company therefore ceased operations in 1984, with the remaining 500 workers losing their jobs.

After the closure, an administrator was appointed by the court to manage the assets. It was taken over by the Damen Group, and used for ship repairs up until the 1990s.

In October 1990, after numerous failed attempts to restart shipbuilding in the area, the Goliath Atlantic, the yard's floating dock was loaded onto a barge and exported to Singapore. This restricted the yard to solely repairs.

The shipyard was acquired in 1995 by the Doyle Shipping Group (DSG) to house its ship repair division. Other parts of the former dockyard site have since been redeveloped into a commercial and light industries park.

In 2018, Doyle Shipping Group decided to dismantle the two cranes due to safety concerns. The cranes, which dated back to the shipyard's operational days, had remained on the site following its closure and had become a local landmark. However, almost 60 years old, they had deteriorated significantly and were considered unsafe.

== Ships built ==
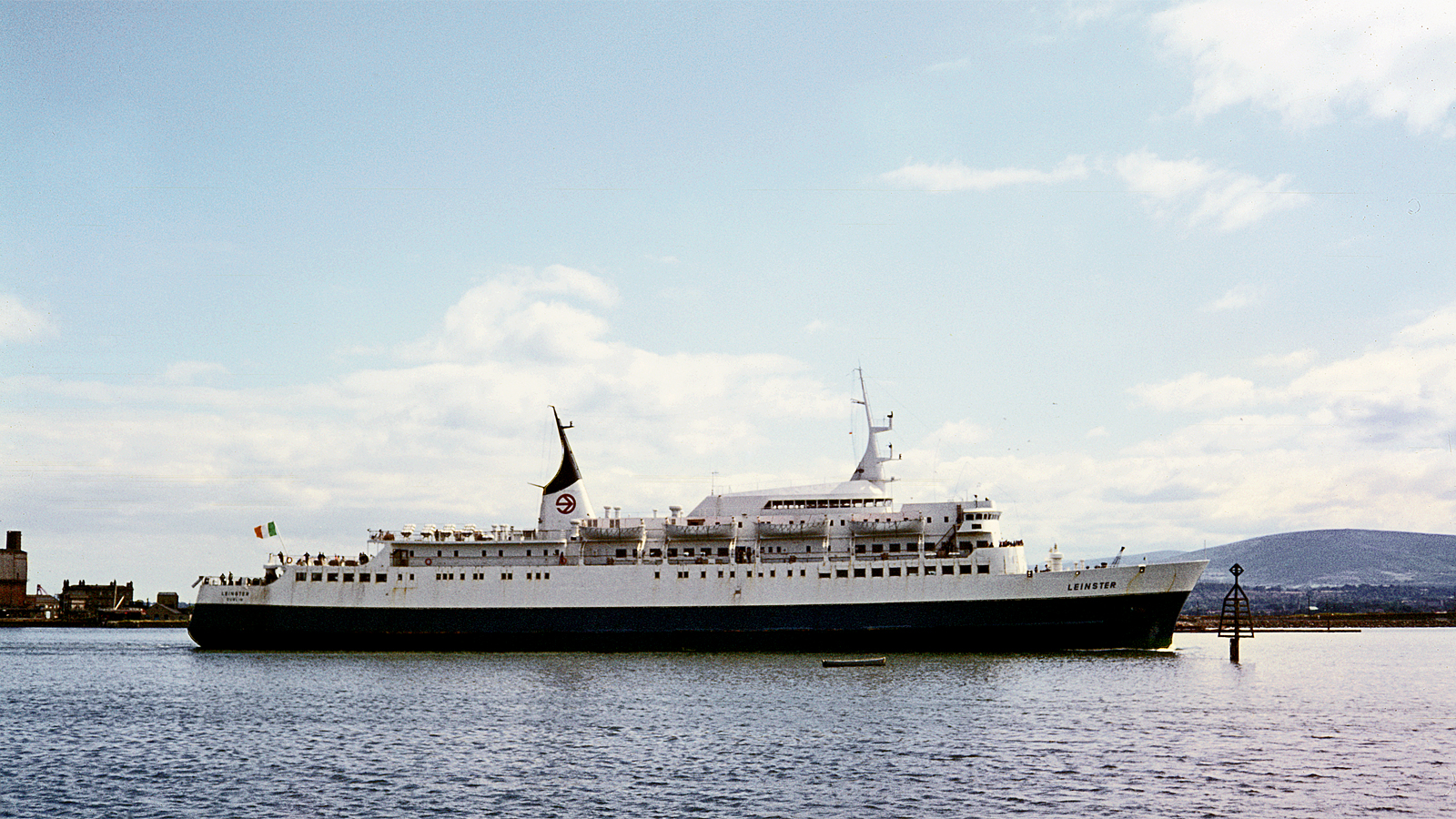
MV Leinster (1969)

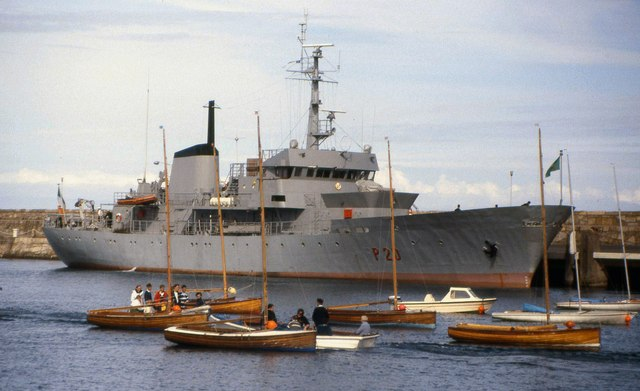
LÉ Deirdre (1972)

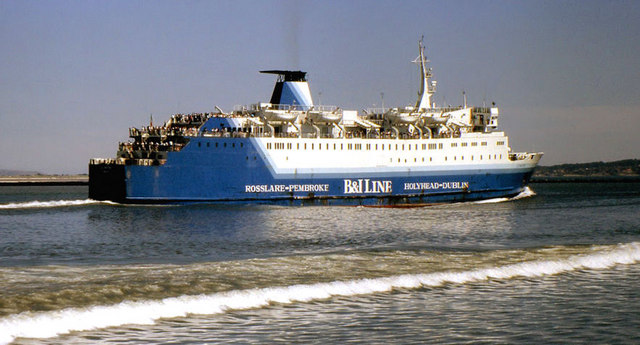
MV Leinster (1981)

Many large ships were built and launched from Verolme. This included a number of vessels, such as LÉ Eithne, which were built for the Irish Naval Service which has its headquarters nearby in Haulbowline.

The largest ship ever built at the shipyard (and in the Republic of Ireland) was the bulk carrier MV Babette Jacob, with a deadweight of 50 000 tons.

- MV Irish Rowan (1962)
- MV Silver Isle (1963)
- MV Amstelhof (1964)
- MV James Benedict (1964)
- MV Maas (1965)
- MV New Adventure (1966)
- MV S.A. Nederburg (1967)
- MV Irish Elm (1968)
- MV Leinster (1969)
- MV Brian Boroime (1970)
- MV Rhodri Mawr (1970)
- MV Irish Stardust (1970)
- MV Darell (1970)
- MV Wicklow (1971)
- MV Star Assyria (1971)
- LÉ Deirdre (1972)
- MV Babette Jacob (1972)
- MV Rolf Jacob (1973)
- MV Kilkenny (1973)
- MV Rinacoltig (1974)
- MV Dundalk (1975)
- MV Margot Jacob (1975)
- MV Lutz Jacob (1976)
- MV Valzell (1976)
- MV Irena Dan (1977)
- MV Serenell (1977)
- LÉ Emer (1978)
- LÉ Aoife (1979)
- MV Connacht (1979)
- LÉ Aisling (1980)
- MV Leinster (1981)
- MV Irish Spruce (1983)
- LÉ Eithne (1984)

== See also ==
- Harland & Wolff
- Irish Shipping
