= MS C.T.M.A. Vacancier =

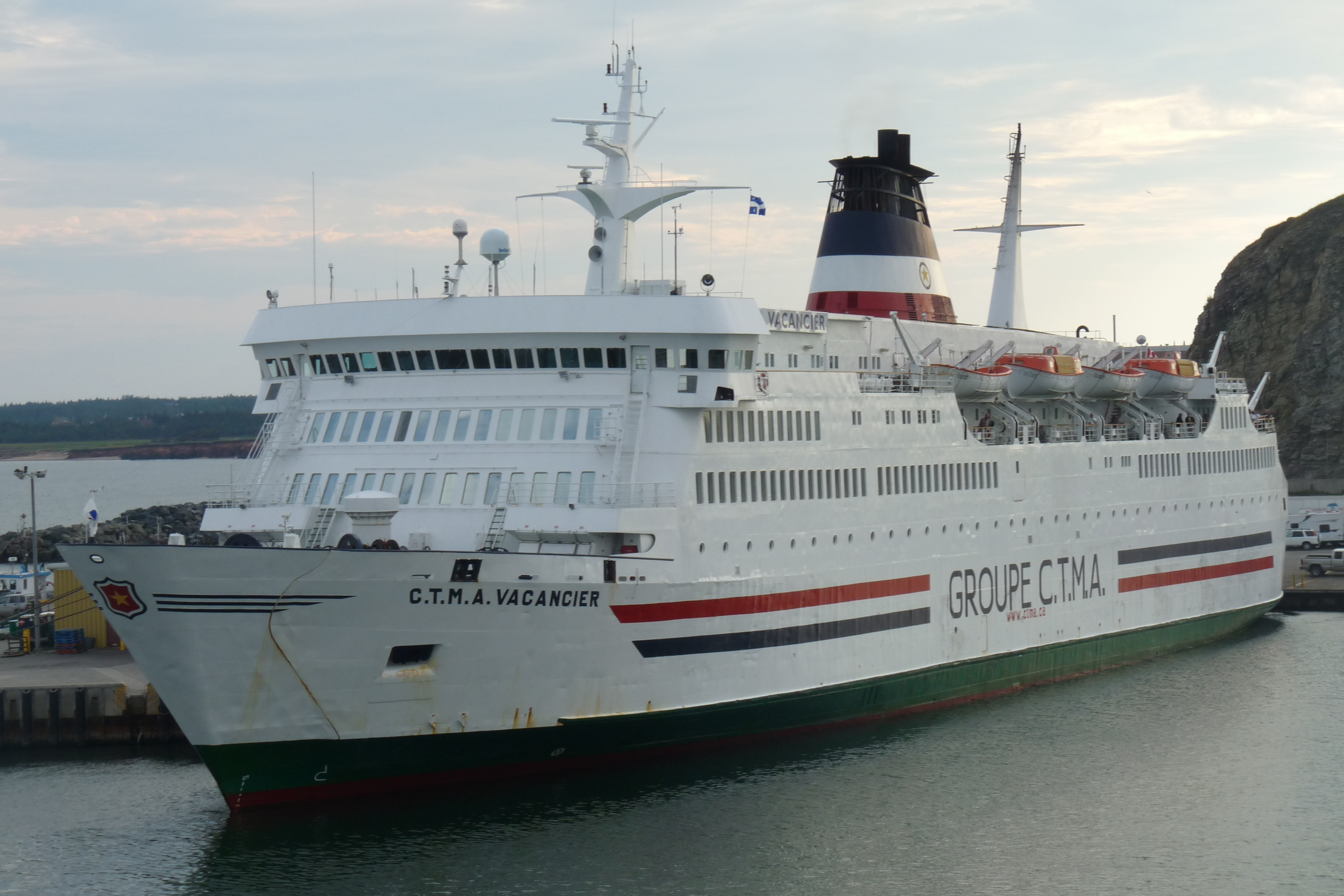
- C.T.M.A. Vacancier at Cap-aux-Meules in 2011.

History

Canada
- Name: 1973–1982: Aurella; 1982–1998: Saint Patrick II; 1998–2000: Egnatia II; 2000–2001: Ville de Séte; 2001–2002: City of Cork; 2002–2024: C.T.M.A. Vacancier; 2024: Ancier
- Owner: 1973–1982: SF Line; 1982–2002: Irish Continental Group; 2002–2023: Navigation Madeleine Inc (CTMA)
- Operator: 1973–1982: SF Line (in Viking Line traffic); 1982–1997 (summer seasons): Irish Ferries; 1982–1997 (winter seasons): several, see text body; 1998–2000: HML; 2000–2000: Balear Express; 2001–2002: Swansea Cork Ferries; 2002–2023: CTMA
- Port of registry: 1973–1982: Mariehamn, Åland, Finland; 1982–2000: Dublin, Ireland; 1992–1995 (winters): Tallinn, Estonia; 2000–2001: Madeira, Portugal; 2001–2002: Valletta, Malta; 2002–2024: Cap-aux-Meules, Canada; 2024: St Kitts and Nevis, Saint Kitts and Nevis
- Route: Montreal–Quebec City–Chandler – Cap-aux-Meules (April 2008–2023)
- Ordered: 27 May 1972
- Builder: J. J. Sietas Schiffswerft, Hamburg, West Germany
- Cost: 33 million DEM
- Yard number: 702
- Launched: 17 March 1973
- Christened: 30 June 1973 by Saga Grönberg
- Completed: 1973
- Acquired: 30 June 1973
- Maiden voyage: 1973
- In service: 3 July 1973
- Out of service: 28 February 2024
- Identification: IMO number: 7310260
- Fate: Scrapped at Alang

General characteristics (as built)
- Type: ropax ferry
- Tonnage: 7,210 GRT; 1,893 t DWT
- Length: 125.22 m (410 ft 10 in)
- Beam: 21.53 m (70 ft 8 in)
- Draught: 8.27 m (27 ft 2 in)
- Installed power: 2 × Stork-Werkspoor 16TM410 diesels; combined 15445 kW
- Speed: 21.5 kn (39.82 km/h)
- Capacity: 1500 passengers; 330 berths; 420 cars

General characteristics (after 2003 refit)
- Tonnage: 7,984 GT; 1,325 t DWT
- Capacity: 1612 passengers; 812 berths; 300 cars
- Notes: Otherwise the same as built

MS C.T.M.A. Vacancier was a car/passenger ferry operated by Coopérative de Transport Maritime et Aérien (CTMA) on their Montreal–Cap-aux-Meules service. She was built in 1973 by the J.J. Sietas Schiffswerft in Hamburg, West Germany as Aurella for SF Line for use on Viking Line traffic. Between 1982 and 1998 she sailed as Saint Patrick II, between 1998 and 2000 as Egnatia II, in 2000 as Ville de Séte and between 2001 and 2002 as City of Cork, before being sold to CTMA. In January 2024 she was renamed Ancier to be prepared for scrapping.

== History ==
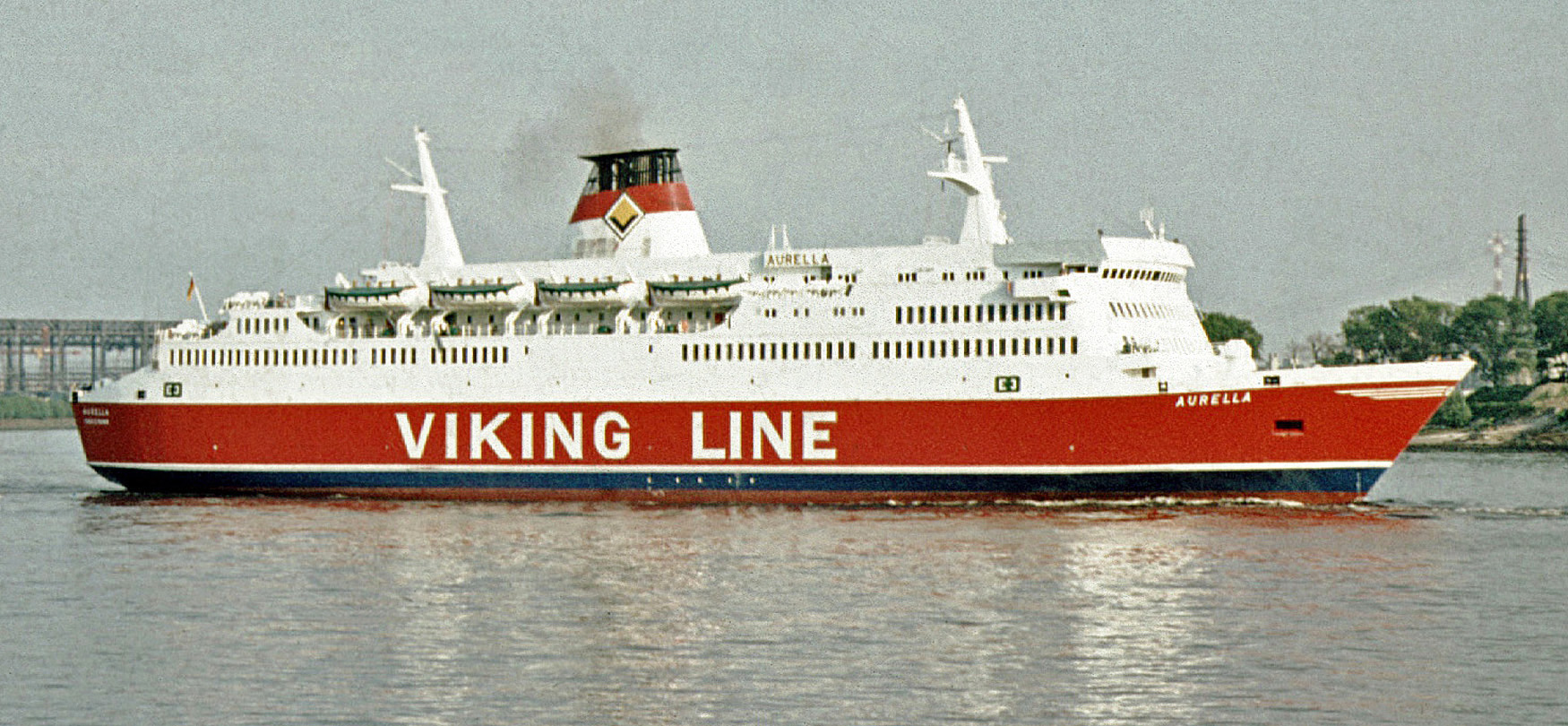
Aurella at Hamburg in June 1973.

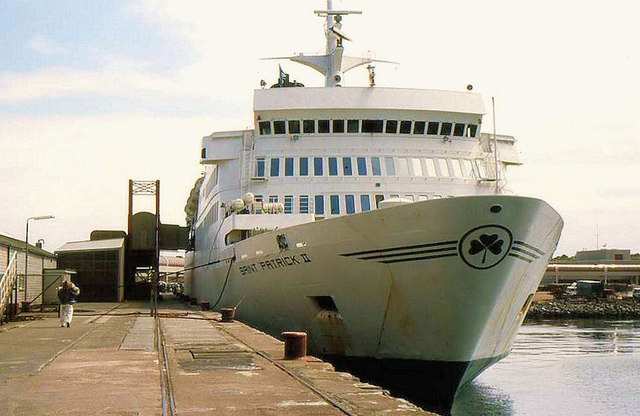
Saint Patrick II at Rosslare.

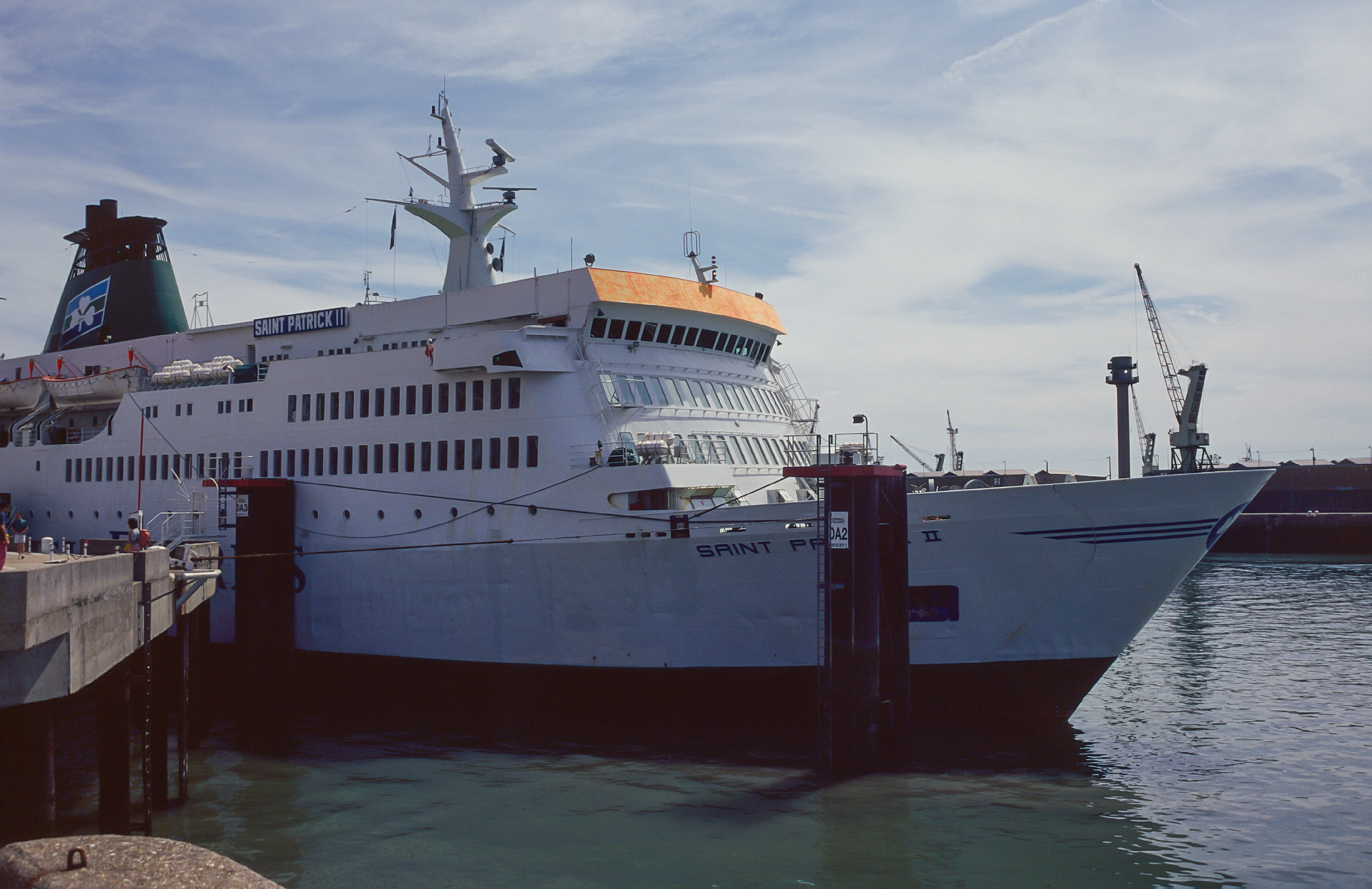
Saint Patrick II at Le Havre on August 8, 1996.

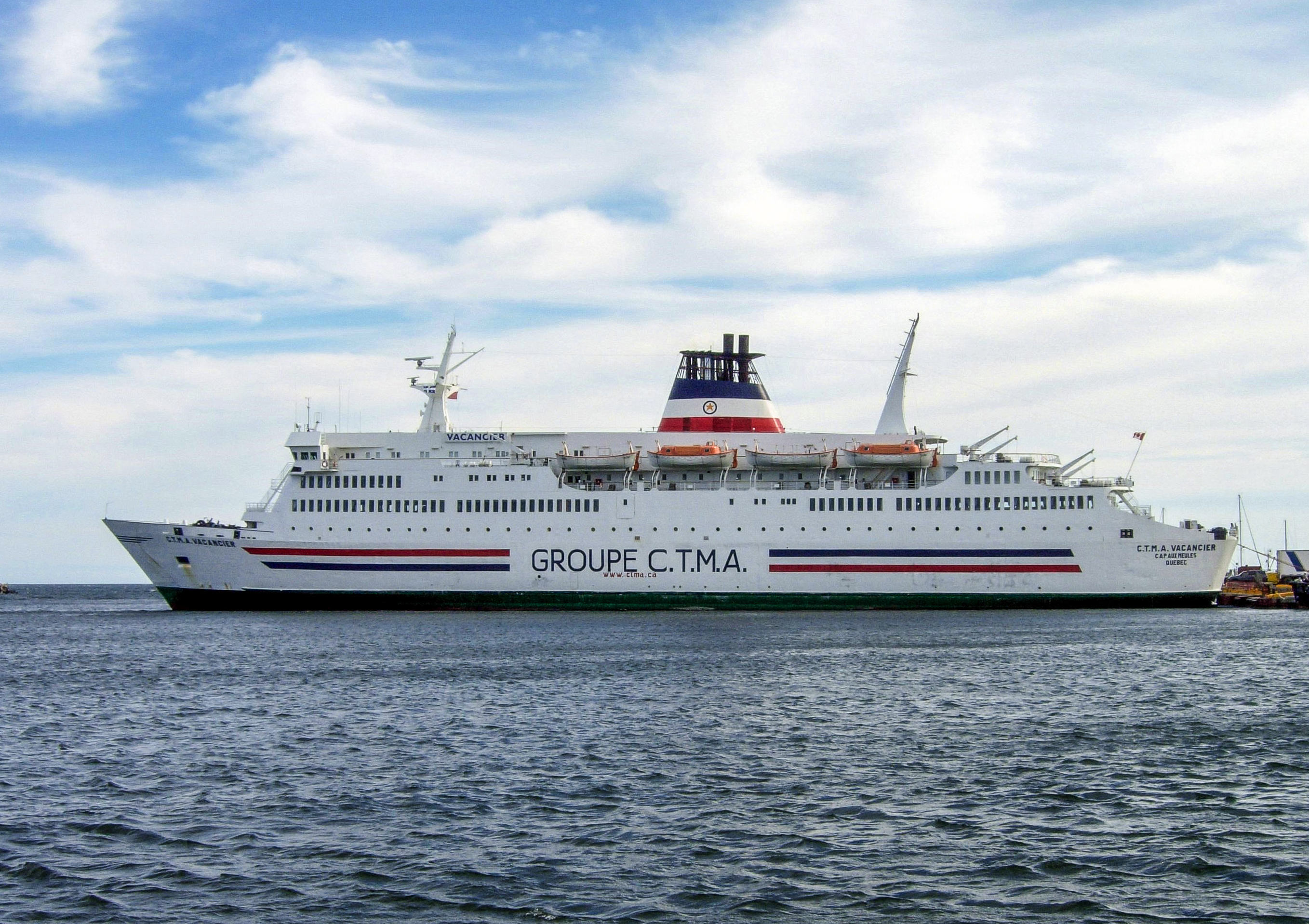
C.T.M.A. Vacancier in 2006

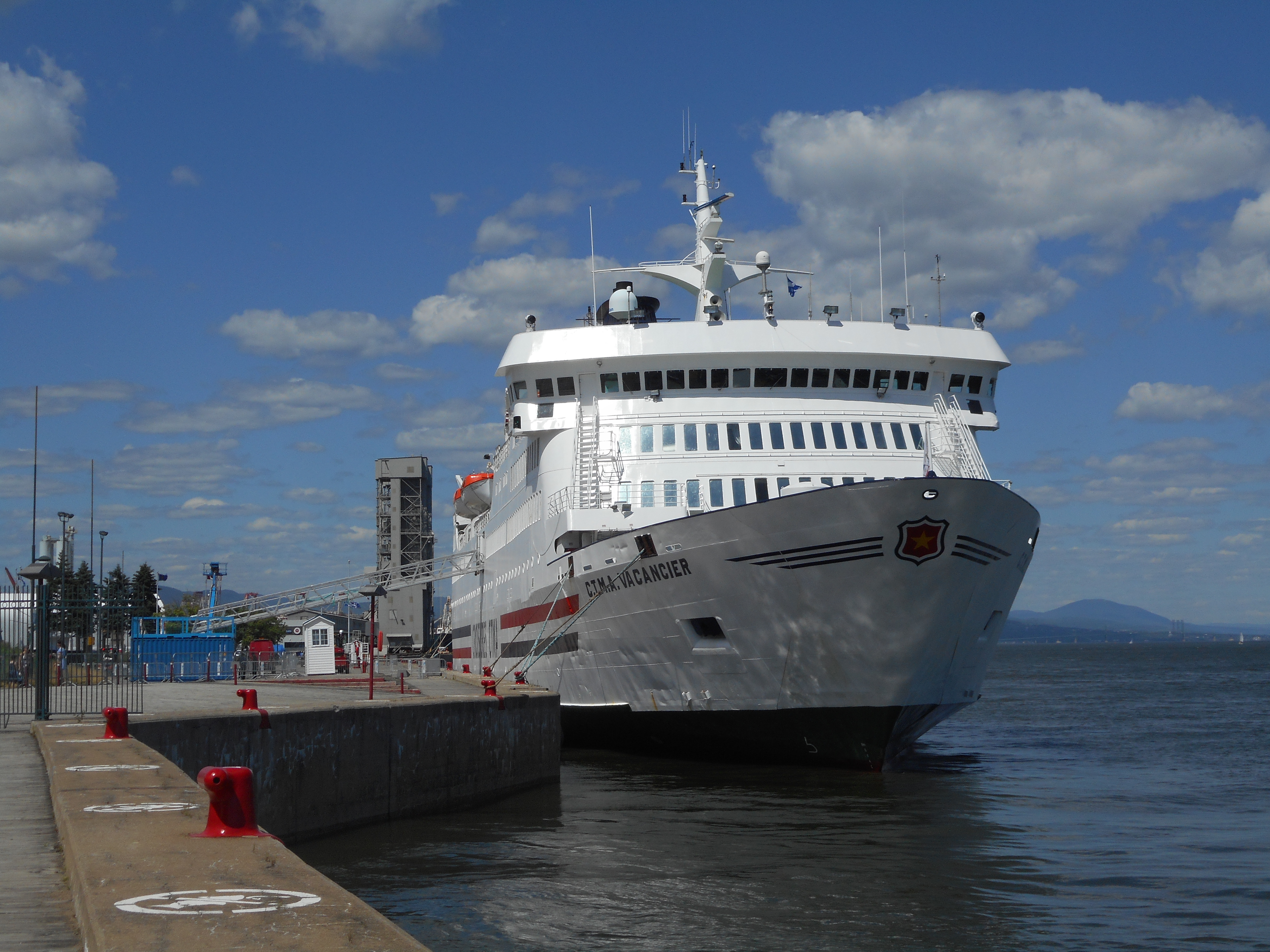
C.T.M.A. Vacancier at Quebec.

Aurella was ordered by SF Line, Finland on 27 May 1972, and delivered on 30 June 1973, entering service three days later on Viking Line's Naantali–Mariehamn–Kapellskär route. She was the largest ship in the services across the Sea of Åland at the time, Aurella remained in service with Viking Line until September 1981.

In January 1982, having been laid up Mariehamn through the winter, Aurella was sold to Irish Ferries and renamed Saint Patrick II, to provide extra capacity on the Ireland-France route in the summer months. The lack of traffic during the winter months saw her chartered to other operators:

- 1982–1983 to North Sea Ferries and Belfast Car Ferries;
- 1984–1985 to B&I Line;
- 1985–1986 to DFDS Seaways and Stena Line;
- 1987–1989 again to B&I Line;
- 1989–1990 to Sealink;
- 1990–1991 to P&O European Ferries.

From 1992 until 1995 Saint Patrick II spent the winters sailing for Tallink. During the Tallink charters the ship was also re-registered to Estonia, but returned to the Irish registry during the summer service with her owners. On 4 March 1994, while under charter to Tallink, Saint Patrick II participated in the evacuation of the sinking cruise ship MS Sally Albatross near Porkkala, Finland. Falling passenger numbers caused Irish Ferries to withdraw Saint Patrick II from service in September 1997.

In May 1998, Saint Patrick II was chartered to Hellenic Mediterranean Lines, renamed Egnatia II and placed on Brindisi–Patras service. In May 2000 she was chartered to Balear Express, Spain and renamed Ville de Séte for Sète–Palma service. Balear Express went bankrupt in September 2000, and Ville de Séte was laid up. Between March and December 2001 she was chartered to Swansea Cork Ferries as City of Cork.

In March 2002, City of Cork was sold to the Government of Canada and registered to Navigation Madeleine Inc, a subsidiary of Coopérative de Transport Maritime et Aérien (CTMA). In June she was renamed C.T.M.A. Vacancier and placed on CTMA's service between Montreal and Cap-aux-Meules. In 2003 she was rebuilt at Les Mechins Dry Dock, Quebec, with covered bridge wings.

In January 2020, C.T.M.A. Vacancier was hired by the Société des traversiers du Québec to cover the Matane-Baie-Comeau-Godbout route across the Saint Lawrence River, while the engines of MV F.-A.-Gauthier engines were repaired and the MV Saaremaa I was altered to meet Transport Canada standards.

In January 2024, she was repainted to remove the logos along the side, renamed Ancier, and sailed to Charlottetown to be prepared for scrapping in India. She was beached at Alang, India, on March 10, 2024.
