= MV Madeleine II =

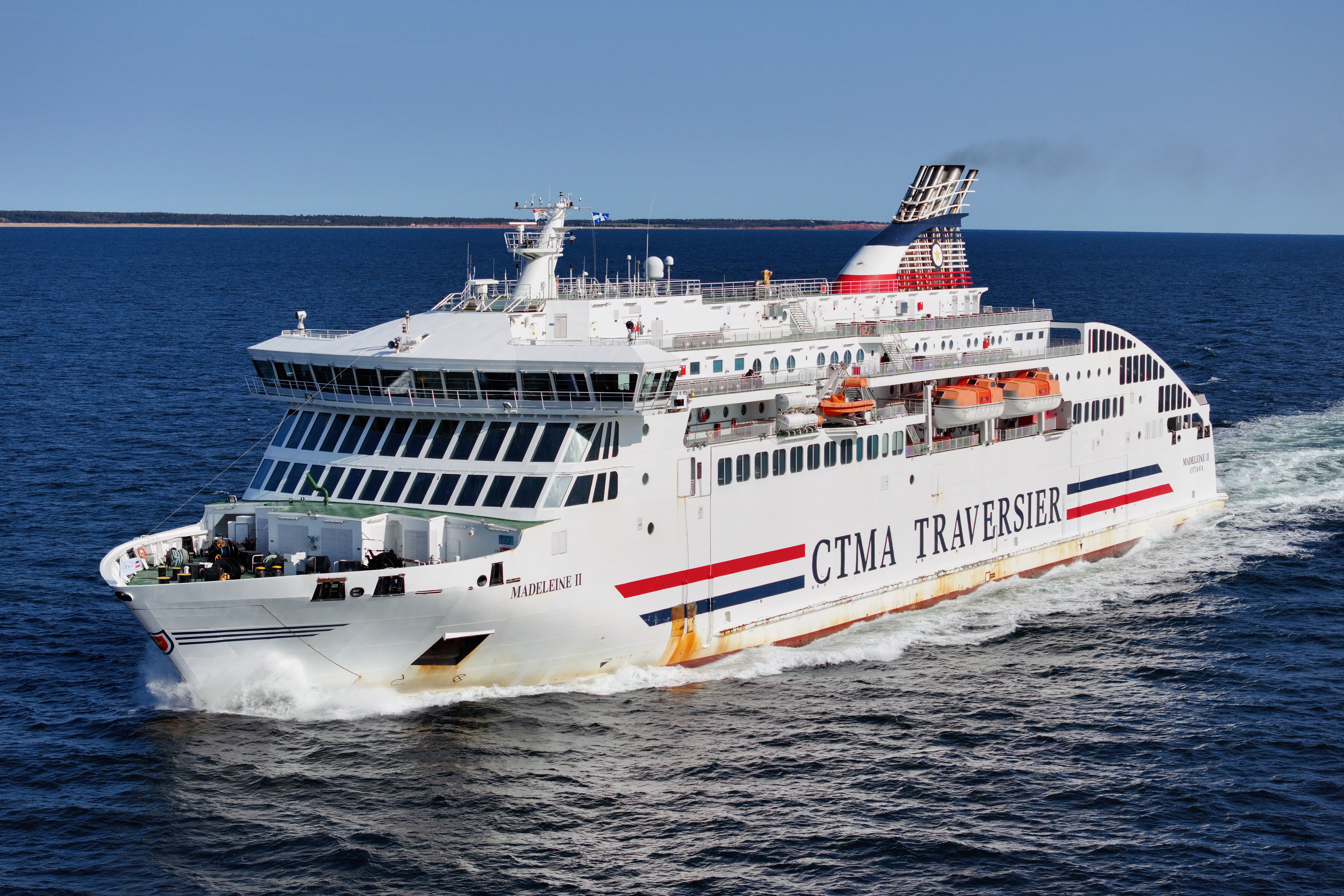
- Madeleine II arriving in Souris, September 2025.

History
- Name: 2021–present: Madeleine II; 2019–2020: Villa de Teror
- Owner: Government of Canada
- Operator: 2021–present: CTMA; 2019–2020: Trasmediterránea
- Port of registry: 2021–present: Ottawa, Canada
- Route: 2021–present: Cap-aux-Meules–Souris; 2019–2020: Motril–Nador, Motril–Al Hoceima; Planned: Mariehamn–Kapellskär
- Ordered: 29 January 2007
- Builder: Astilleros de Sevilla (Seville, Spain); Factorías Vulcano S.A. (Vigo, Spain)
- Cost: Approximately €60 million
- Laid down: 6 May 2007
- Launched: 29 May 2013
- Identification: IMO number: 9430105
- Status: In service

General characteristics (planned)
- Type: Ro-ro/passenger ferry
- Tonnage: 15,600 GT; About 2,300 DWT
- Length: 139.12 m (456 ft)
- Beam: 22 m (72 ft)
- Draught: 5.7 m (19 ft) (design)
- Ramps: Bow and stern ramps, side door
- Ice class: 1 A
- Installed power: 2 × Wärtsilä 8L46F (2 × 9,600 kW)
- Propulsion: Two shafts; controllable pitch propellers; Two bow thrusters
- Speed: 21.8 knots (40.4 km/h; 25.1 mph)
- Capacity: 1,500 passengers; 450 cars (originally 320 cars) or 600 linear metres of ro-ro cargo plus 130 cars
- Crew: 61

MV Madeleine II is a cruiseferry operated by the Canadian company Coopérative de Transport Maritime et Aérien (CTMA). It was previously operated by the Spanish company Trasmediterránea as the MV Villa de Teror.

Originally ordered by the Finnish ferry company Viking Line for the Mariehamn–Kapellskär route under the project name Viking ADCC (All-seasons Day Cruising and Commuting), the ship was built by the Spanish shipyard Astilleros de Sevilla and was originally planned for delivery in 2009. Viking ADCC would have been the first purpose-built ferry to serve that route. However, Viking Line cancelled the order on 8 February 2010, due to the shipyard's inability to complete the ship on time.

The ship eventually entered service with Trasmediterránea as Villa de Teror in 2019, after multiple delays. In 2020, it was announced that the Government of Canada would purchase Villa de Teror, where it would be used on CTMA's services to the Magdalen Islands of Quebec from 2021.

== Concept and construction ==
Viking ADCC was designed specifically for the needs of the short Mariehamn–Kapellskär service. Many of her features were designed to minimise environmental impact.

Viking ADCC was ordered by Viking Line from the Astilleros de Sevilla shipyard in Spain on 29 January 2007. In June of the same year, the build contract of the vessel was sold to the Spanish investment bank Basalease SA, who would charter the vessel to Viking Line when completed. Construction of Viking ADCC began on 18 December 2007. The keel of the vessel was laid on 6 May 2008.

Until 2013, the half-built hull remained at the shipyard facing an uncertain future. In February, it was reported that the unfinished ship had been sold to another Spanish shipyard, Factorias Vulcano, which would complete the ship. After some minor work done on the vessel by Factorías Vulcano personnel, the unfinished hull was launched on 29 May 2013 and in June towed to Factorías Vulcano shipyard in Vigo. Photographs showed that the hull of the vessel was almost finished but the superstructure was missing large sections. The long search for a buyer ended when the agreement to sell the ship to Trasmediterránea was signed at the end April 2017. The ship should have been completed and delivered before the high season of 2018. However, the work was seriously delayed, partly due to the poor economic situation of Factorías Vulcano. The first sea trials were made in October 2018 and when work on the ship resumed on 25 March 2019, after several months of inactivity, there were still an estimated 42 days of work remaining. After still missing a couple of delivery deadlines in June, the ferry eventually left the shipyard on 27 June 2019 and about a week later entered service on the Motril–Nador, Motril–Al Hoceima routes.

On 16 September 2020, the Government of Canada announced that it had purchased the ship for $155 million to replace the MS Madeleine on CTMA's route between Souris, Prince Edward Island, and Cap-aux-Meules in Quebec's Magdalen Islands from the summer of 2021. This is intended as an interim measure, as a newly built vessel is planned to enter service on the route in 2026.

== Naming ==
During the summer months of 2008, a competition for naming the ship was held. Since the ship was never delivered to Viking Line, the winner of the contest and the final name of the ship was never published. In April 2018 it was reported that the name of the ship in Trasmediterránea's fleet would be Villa de Teror, referring to the town of Teror, also known with the longer name Villa Mariana de Teror.

== Design ==
Many of the originally intended interior features of Viking ADCC were suggested by the public in a competition organised by Viking Line. Interiors of the ship were designed by Tillberg Design, a company that also designed the interiors of the 2008-built Viking XPRS. Onboard facilities were to include two restaurants, a two-deck high cafeteria, dance bar and conference rooms. Like Viking XPRS, Viking ADCC was designed with separate decks for freight and passenger cars. For Trasmediterránea changes were made in the ship architecture and interiors designed by the Spanish company Oliver Design.
