= MV Akdeniz (1979) =

- Prince as Dubrovnik at Dubrovnik in 2008.

History
- Name: Connacht (1979–1988); Duchesse Anne (1988–1996); Dubrovnik (1996–2023); Prince (2023–present)
- Owner: B+I Line (1979–1988); Brittany Ferries (1988–1996); Jadrolinija (1996–2023); A-Ships Management (2023–present)
- Port of registry: Dublin, Ireland (1979–1988); Saint-Malo, France (1988–1996); Rijeka, Croatia (1996–2023); Panama, Panama (2023–Present)
- Builder: Verolme Cork Dockyards; Ireland
- Yard number: 955
- Laid down: 8 August 1977
- Launched: 20 June 1978
- Completed: 12 January 1979
- Maiden voyage: 7 February 1979
- In service: 1979
- Identification: IMO number: 7615048
- Status: Under refit

General characteristics
- Length: 122.36 m (401 ft 5 in)
- Beam: 18.82 m (61 ft 9 in)
- Draught: 4.83 m (15 ft 10 in)
- Speed: 20 knots (37 km/h; 23 mph)
- Capacity: 1,300 passengers; 300 cars

Akdeniz is a ferry currently owned by Greek company A-Ships Management. She previously sailed for B+I Line as the Connacht, Brittany Ferries as the Duchesse Anne and Jadrolinija as the Dubrovnik.

== Specifications ==
The capacity of the ferry is 1,300 passengers and 300 vehicles, with 148 cabins with a total of 457 beds, and 384 airline seats.

== History ==
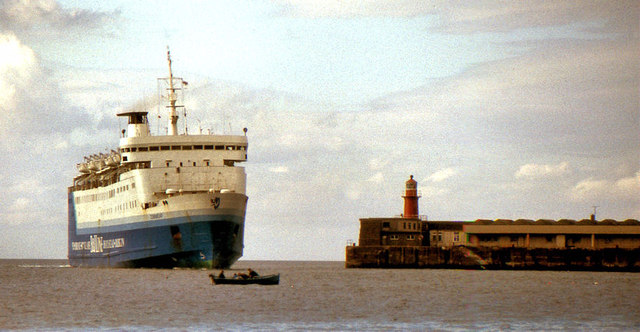
The Prince as the Connacht with B+I Line in 1988

=== B+I Line ===
Prince was built in 1979 in Verolme Cork Dockyards in Ireland for B+I Line under the name Connacht for the Cork - Swansea and Cork - Pembroke Dock routes. In 1980 she was moved to the Dublin - Liverpool route, and in 1982 she was moved to the Dublin - Holyhead route.

=== Brittany Ferries ===
In 1988, she was sold to Brittany Ferries and was sent to Jos. L. Meyer Werft in Papenburg, Germany. She was renamed the Duchesse Anne and was put on the Saint-Malo - Portsmouth route. She was later introduced on the Saint-Malo - Cork, Roscoff - Cork and Plymouth - Roscoff routes.

=== Jadrolinija ===
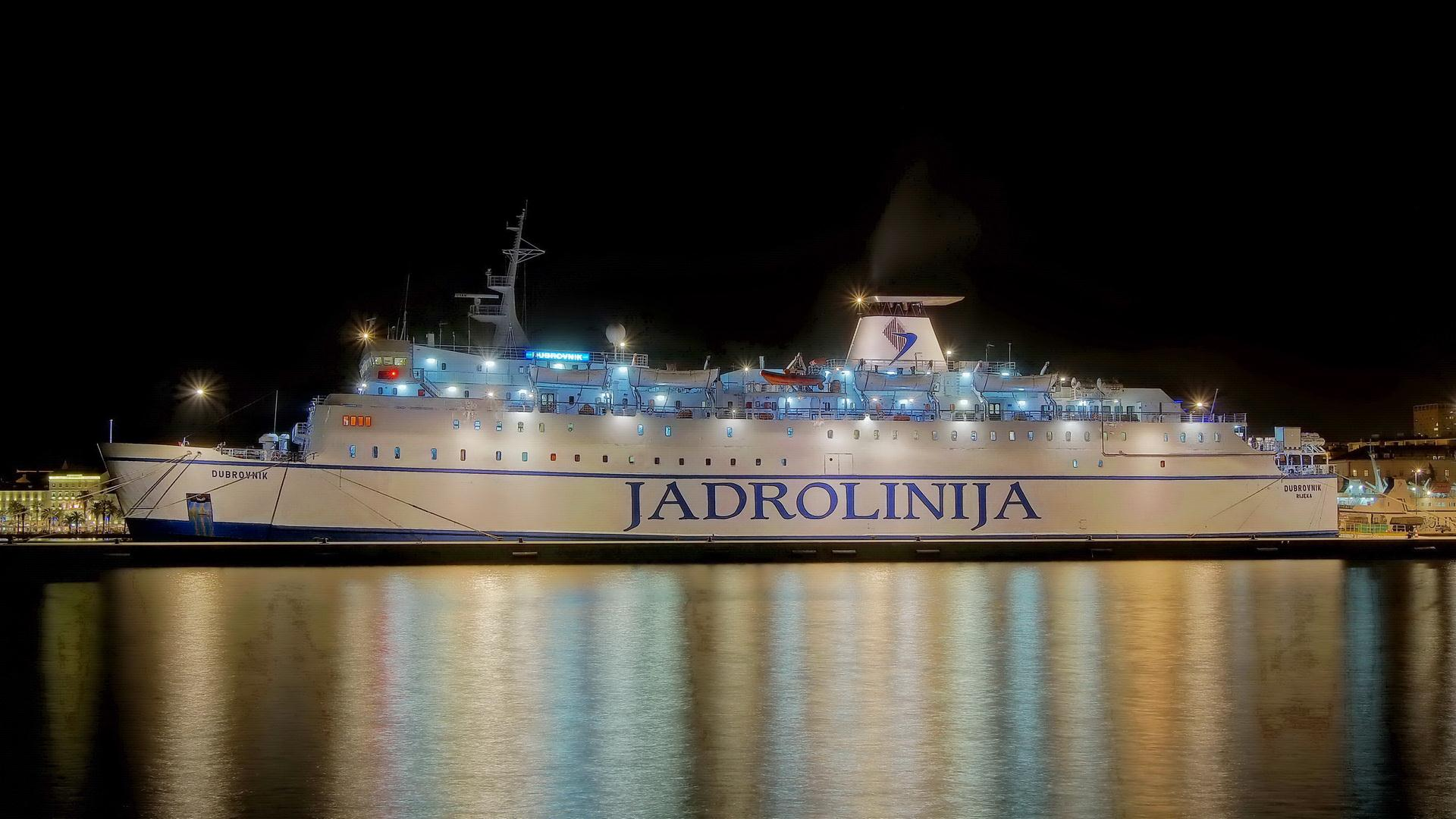
Dubrovnik in Split, Croatia, on 3 January 2012, before departing to Ancona, Italy.

In 1996, Jadrolinija acquired her, she was renamed Dubrovnik, after the city of Dubrovnik, and she commenced service between Croatia and Italy.

=== A-Ships Management ===
In 2023 the Dubrovnik was sold to a Greek company called A-Ships Management and was renamed the Prince. It is reported that she will operate services between Italy and Montenegro.
