= Swansea Cork Ferries =

Swansea Cork Ferries Ltd
- Company type: Limited
- Founded: 1987
- Defunct: 2006
- Fate: Parent company dissolved
- Headquarters: Cork, Ireland
- Area served: Celtic Sea
- Key people: Thomas Hunter-McGowan, MD
- Services: Passenger transportation Freight transportation
- Owner: 1992-1999: Strintzis; 1999-2006: Briar Star Ltd; 2006-date Thomas Hunter Mc Gowan
- Website: www.swanseacorkferries.com

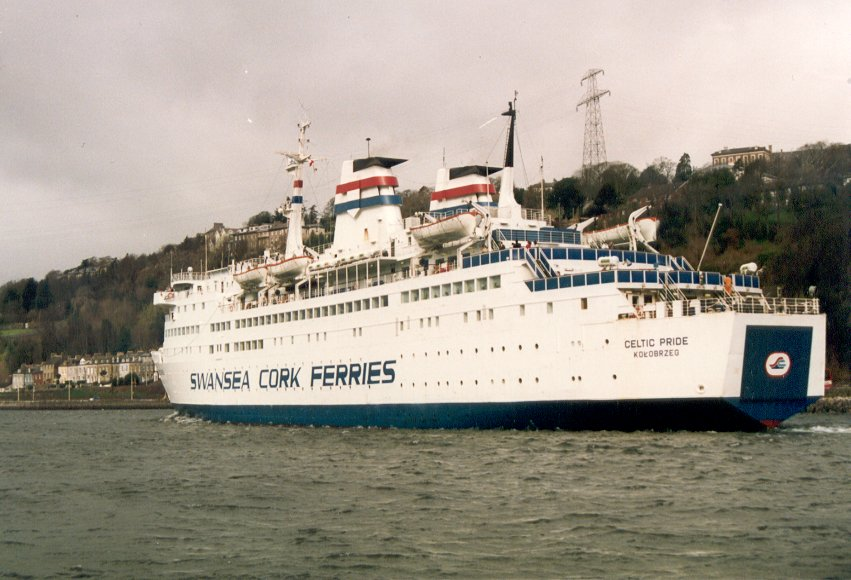
Celtic Pride

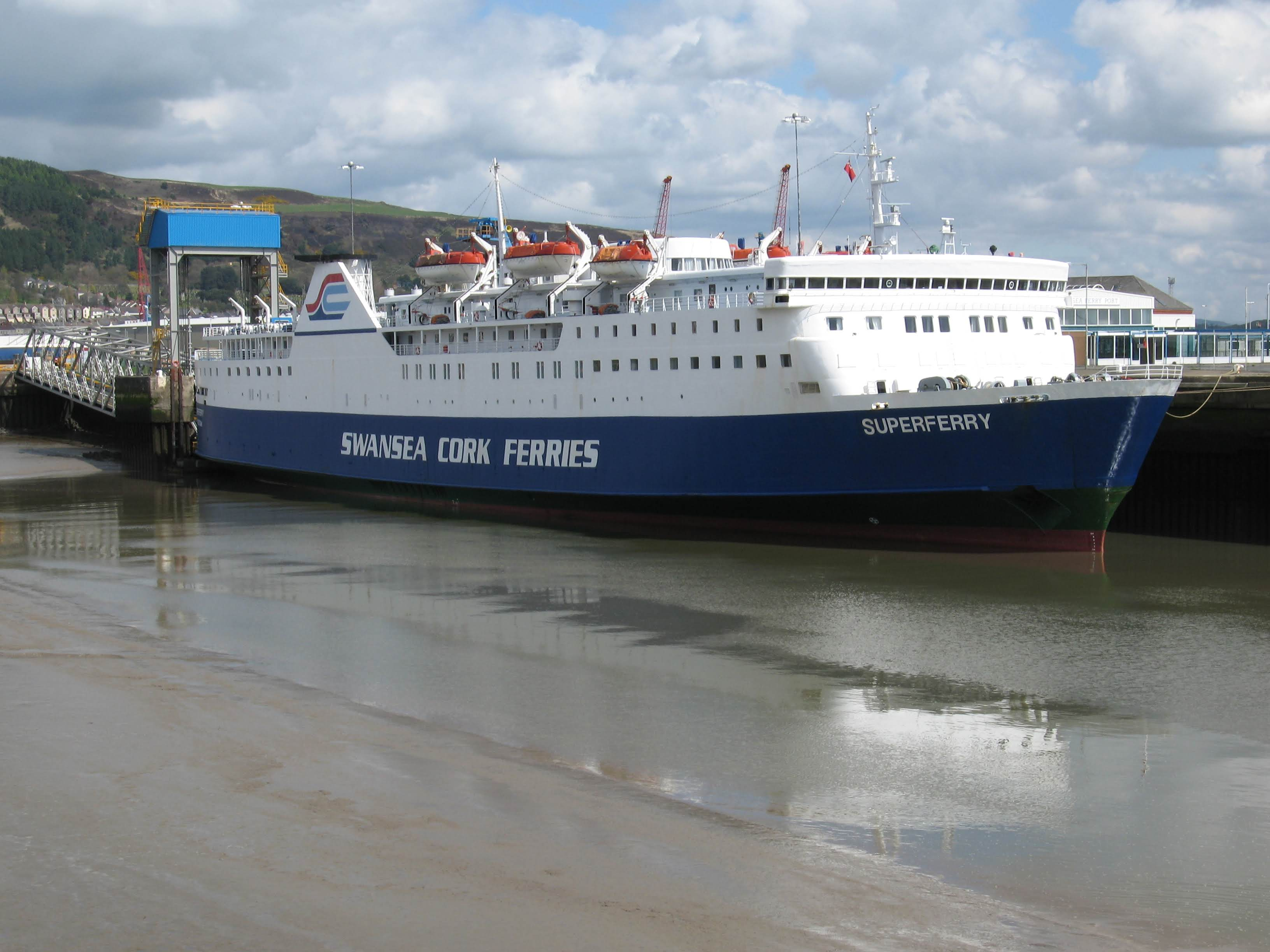
Swansea Cork Ferry - Superferry

Swansea Cork Ferries was a company that operated a RoRo service between Swansea and Cork (Ringaskiddy) from 1987 till 2006. The company no longer offers a ferry service but provides consultancy services. Its former owners Strintzis Lines are now part of the Attica Group, and Briarstar Ltd was dissolved in 2012. The company remains in the ownership of Thomas Hunter Mc Gowan.

A Swansea–Cork ferry service was restarted by Fastnet Line in March 2010, but services were suspended in November 2011 due to the economic situation.

== History ==
- 1987 - Swansea Cork Ferries formed following B&I Line's withdrawal from the route four years earlier.
- 1992 - Sold to Greek shipping company Strintzis Lines.
- 1999 - Swansea Cork Ferries sold to an Irish business consortium.
- 2006 - Superferry operates last sailing on 7 October.

== Fleet ==
Swansea Cork Ferries operated four ships during its 20 years in operation.

Ship	Built	In service	Tonnage	Flag	Notes
Celtic Pride	1972	1987-1989; 1991 & 1992	7,800 GRT	Poland	Scrapped 2004
Ionian Sun	1969	1990	4,849 GRT	Greece	Scrapped 2004
City of Cork	1973	2001	7,210 GRT	Malta	Scrapped 2024
Superferry	1972	1993-2000; 2002-2006	7,454 GRT	Greece	Scrapped 2021
