= MV Leinster (1968) =

Ro Ro car ferry built in Rushbrooke, Ireland and launched in 1968

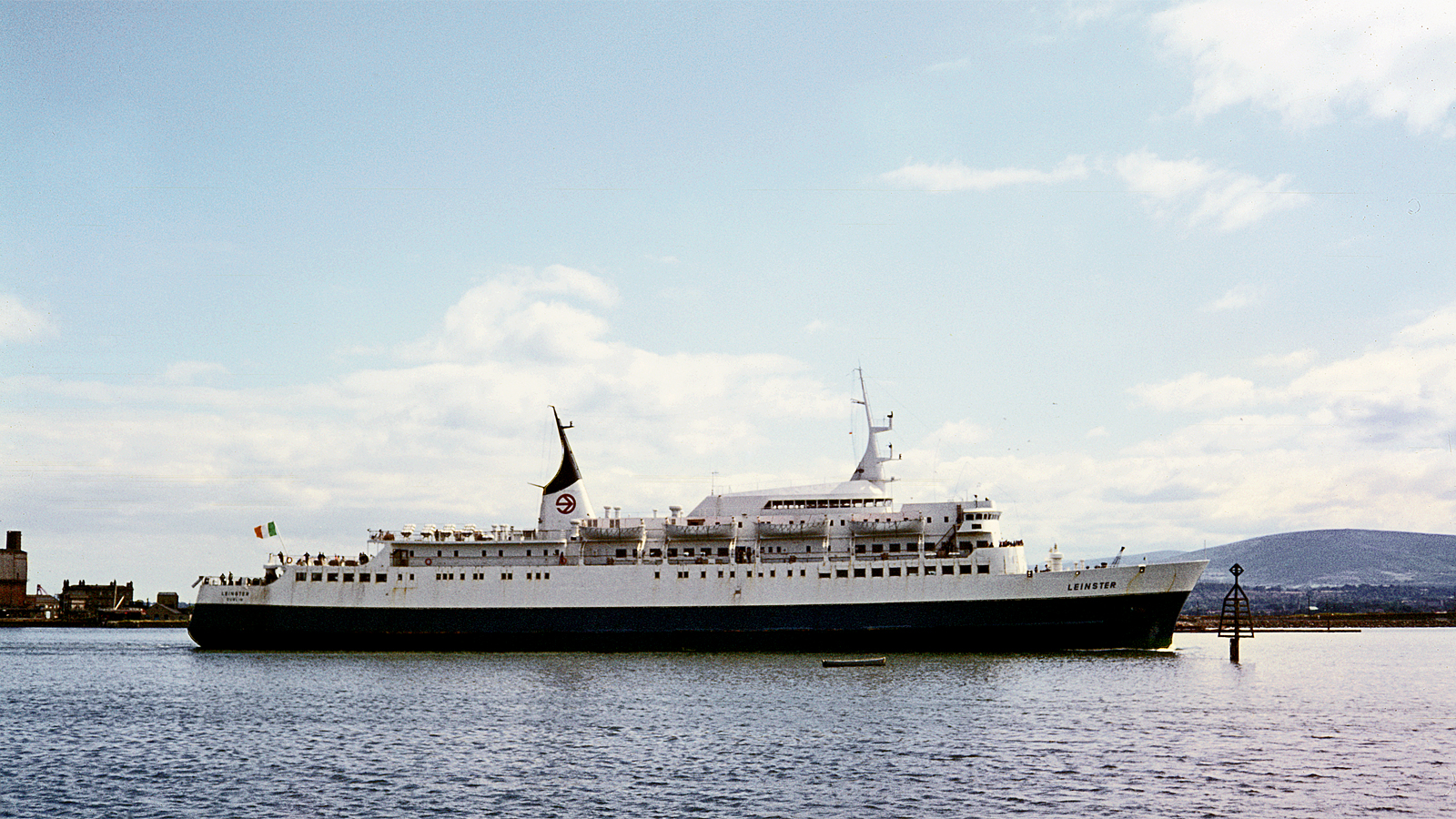
- MV Leinster, 1969

History
- Name: 1968–1980: Leinster; 1980–1986: Innisfallen; 1986–1993: Ionian Sun; 1993–1993: Chams; 1993–2001: Ionian Sun; 2001–2004: Merdif
- Operator: 1969–1986: B+I Line; 1986–1990: Strintzis Lines; 1990–1990: Swansea Cork Ferries; 1990–1993: Strintzis Lines; 1993–1993: Compagnie Tunisienne de Navigation; 1993–2001: Strintzis Lines; 2001–2004: Marco Shipping Agency
- Port of registry: 1968–1986: Ireland; 1986–2001: Piraeus, Greece; 2001–2004: Dubai, UAE
- Route: Dublin–Liverpool (1969–1980); Cork–Pembroke Dock (1980–1982); Cork–Rosslare–Pembroke Dock (1982–1983); Rosslare–Pembroke Dock (1983–1986); Ancona–Corfu–Igoumenitsa–Patras (1987–1990); Cork–Swansea (Summer 1990); Sailing in the Greek Archipelago (1991–1993); Genova–Tunis (1993–1993); Igoumenitsa–Brindisi (1993–1994); Igoumenitsa–Corfu–Brindisi (1994–1997); Sailing in the Greek Archipelago (1997–2000); Sailing from Dubai across the Persian Gulf (2001–2004)
- Builder: Verolme Cork Dockyard
- Launched: 19 November 1968
- Completed: 1969
- Maiden voyage: 1969
- In service: 1969
- Out of service: 2004
- Identification: IMO number: 6902767
- Fate: Scrapped at Alang, India in 2004.

General characteristics
- Tonnage: 5,000 GRT
- Length: 118.32 m (388 ft 2 in)
- Beam: 17.84 m (58 ft 6 in)
- Draught: 4.45 m (14 ft 7 in)
- Speed: 20 knots (37 km/h; 23 mph)
- Capacity: 1,200 passengers, 230 cars

MV Leinster was launched in 1968 and operated initially for the British and Irish Steam Packet Company (B+I Line). The c. 5,000-ton ship as built had capacity for 1,200 passengers and 220 cars. The ship has also been known under several other names including Innisfallen, Ionian Sun, Chams and Merdif.

== History ==
The ship was built at Verolme Cork Dockyards Ltd., Rushbrooke, County Cork, Ireland. It initially worked for B+I Line on the Dublin to Liverpool route. Sister ships of a broadly similar design were Prins Bertil, Gustav Vasa, Kronprins, Karl Gustav, MV Munster (1968), and MV Innisfallen (1969), the latter two for B+I Line. Leinster had a multi-windows observation lounge deck with cocktail bar above the bridge which could differentiate her from Munster who also worked Dublin-Liverpool.

The c. 5,000-ton ship as built had capacity for 1,200 passengers and 230 cars. The top speed of not less than 20 knots (37 km/h; 23 mph) from four diesel engines allowed the ship to make the daytime crossing from Dublin Port to Carriers' Dock, Liverpool in seven hours. Ships of the class had bow and stern doors allowing a turnaround time of one hour. They were also equipped with bow thrusters and stabilizers.

From 1980 to 1986, the ship was mostly reallocated to the Southern Irish Sea routes variously Cork and Rosslare to Swansea and Pembroke Dock; taking the name Innisfallen from her sister ship. (Note: Leinster, named after the province of Leinster, may have been seen as inappropriate for a ship primarily allocated to operating from Cork in the province of Munster. While Rosslare is in the province of Leinster, the name would primarily associate with B+I Line's Dublin—Liverpool route. This also allowed for the upcoming B+I Line 1981 ship to be named Leinster)

1986 saw the vessel sold to the Strintzis Lines, Cyprus for operations in the Mediterranean Sea. In the summer of 1990 she briefly returned to the South Irish Sea on charter to Swansea Cork Ferries and in 1993 she was briefly named Chams for a Tunisia—Genoa charter operation.

In November 2001 the vessel was sold to Marco Shipping Agency, Dubai and renamed Merdif and finally scrapped at Alang, India in 2004.
