= Coopérative de Transport Maritime et Aérien =

Canadian transportation company

CTMA
- Industry: Passenger transportation Freight transportation
- Founded: 1944
- Headquarters: Cap-aux-Meules, Quebec, Canada
- Area served: Gulf of St Lawrence; Saint Lawrence River
- Website: www.ctma.ca

The Coopérative de Transport Maritime et Aérien (CTMA) is a Canadian transportation company, formed in 1944 to provide maritime and air links to the Magdalen Islands, Quebec.

Labelling itself Groupe CTMA, the company operates the year-round ferry service from Cap-aux-Meules, Quebec in the Magdalen Islands to Souris, Prince Edward Island using the vessel MV Madeleine II. It also operates a year-round cargo service from Montreal and Matane, Quebec to Cap-aux-Meules using the vessel, C.T.M.A. Voyageur 2 as well as a trucking company for transporting cargo to and from the Magdalen Islands, as well as providing air services.

It formerly operated a seasonal passenger service from Montreal to Cap-aux-Meules using the vessel MS C.T.M.A. Vacancier.

== Routes ==
C.T.M.A. operate two routes to the Magdalen Islands:

- Montreal - Quebec City - Chandler - Cap-aux-Meules
- Souris - Cap-aux-Meules

== Current fleet ==
C.T.M.A. operates a fleet of Roll-on/roll-off passenger vessels (RoPax).

Name	Built	Entered service	Tonnage	Note
CTMA Voyageur 2	1998	2019	7,606 GRT	RORO commercial cargo vessel used for service between Montreal and Cap-aux-Meules.
Madeleine II	2019	2021	15,966 GRT	

=== Gallery of current fleet ===
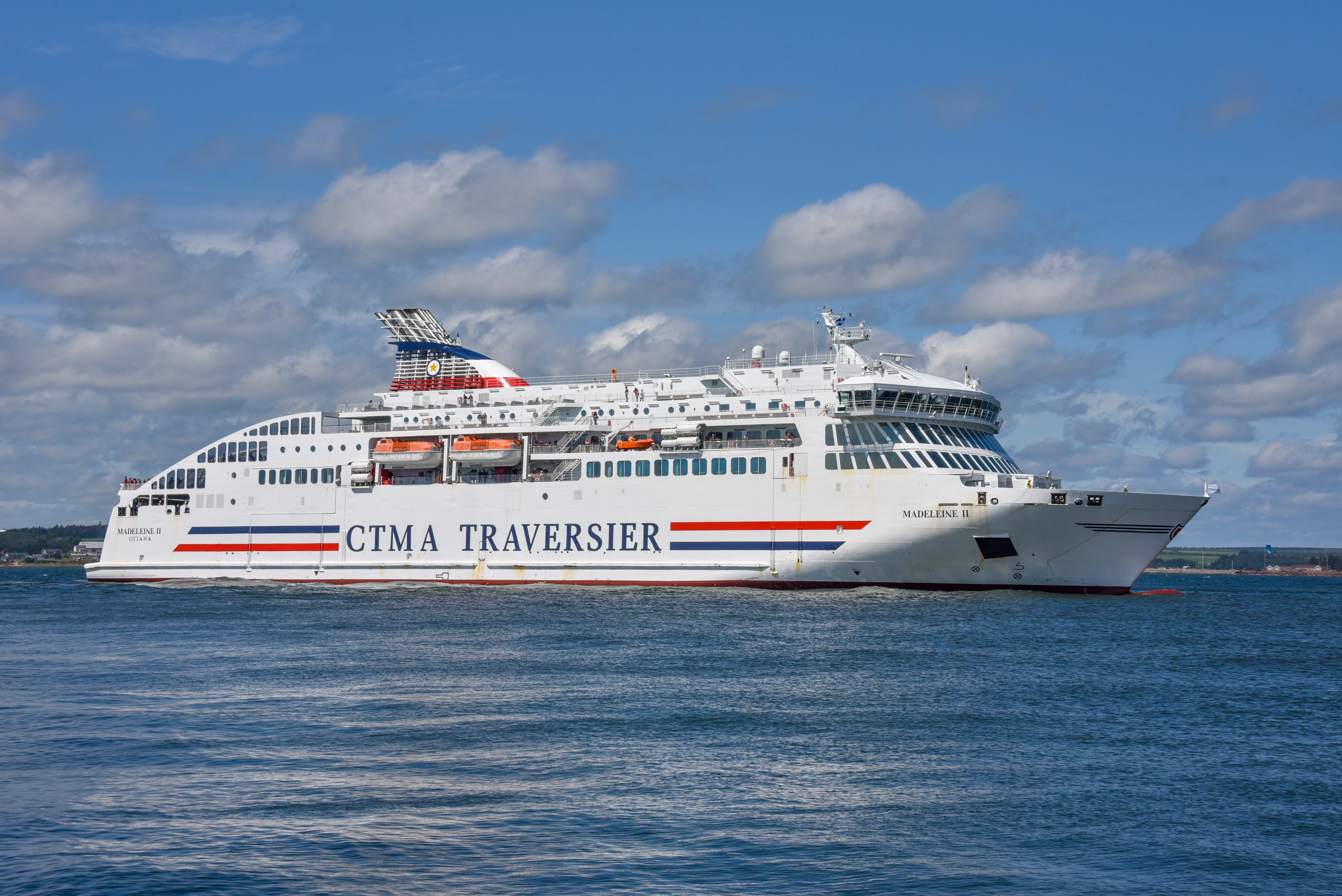
Madeleine II, coming into Souris, PEI in August 2021

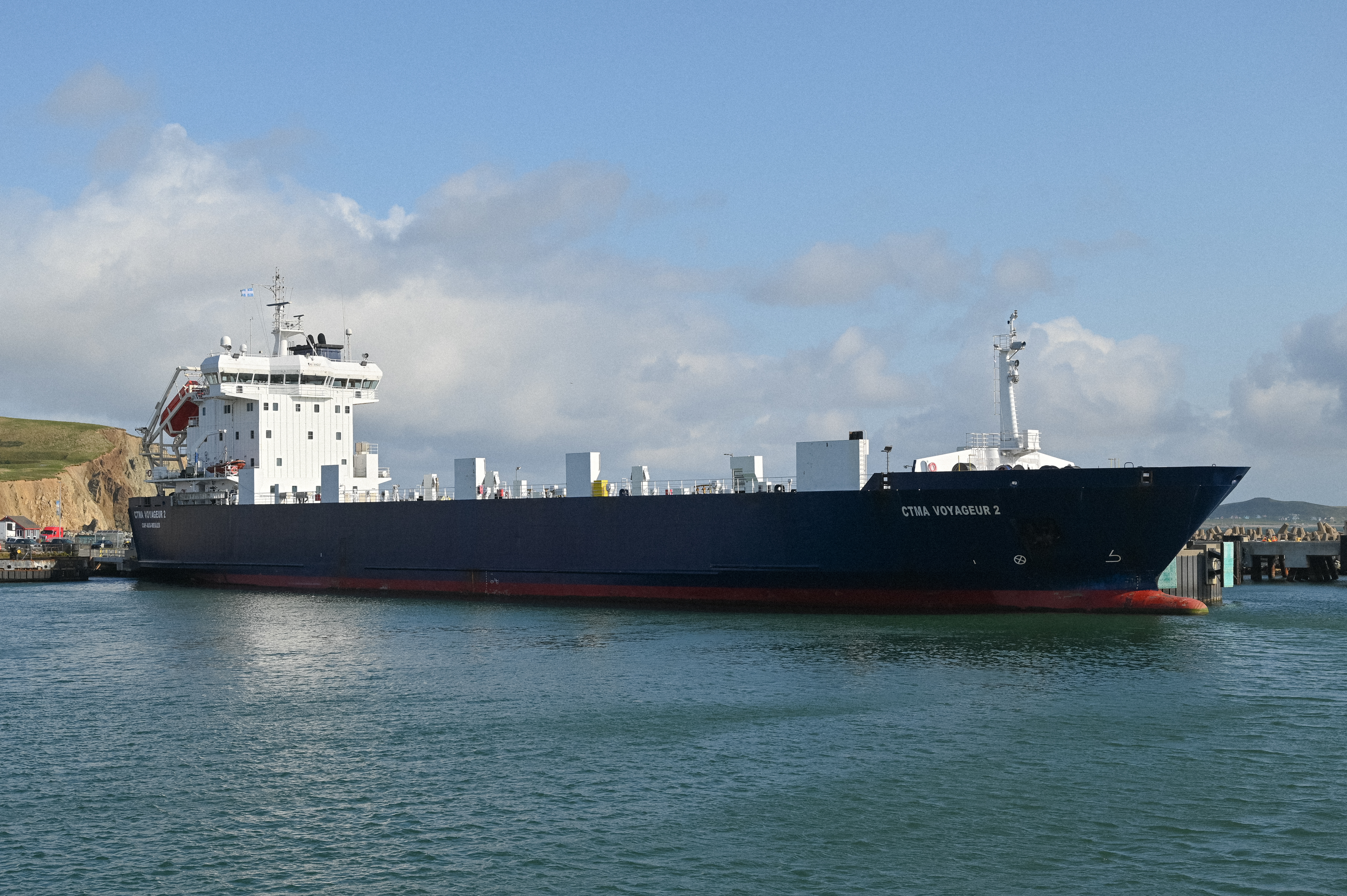
C.T.M.A. Voyageur 2 at Cap-aux-Meules, Îles-de-la-Madeleine, Canada

== Past Fleet ==
Name	Built	Entered service	Left service	Tonnage	Note
C.T.M.A. Vacancier	1973	2002	2024	7,984 GT	Scrapped at Alang, India
Madeleine	1981	1997	2021	6,807 GRT	Scrapped

=== Gallery of past fleet ===
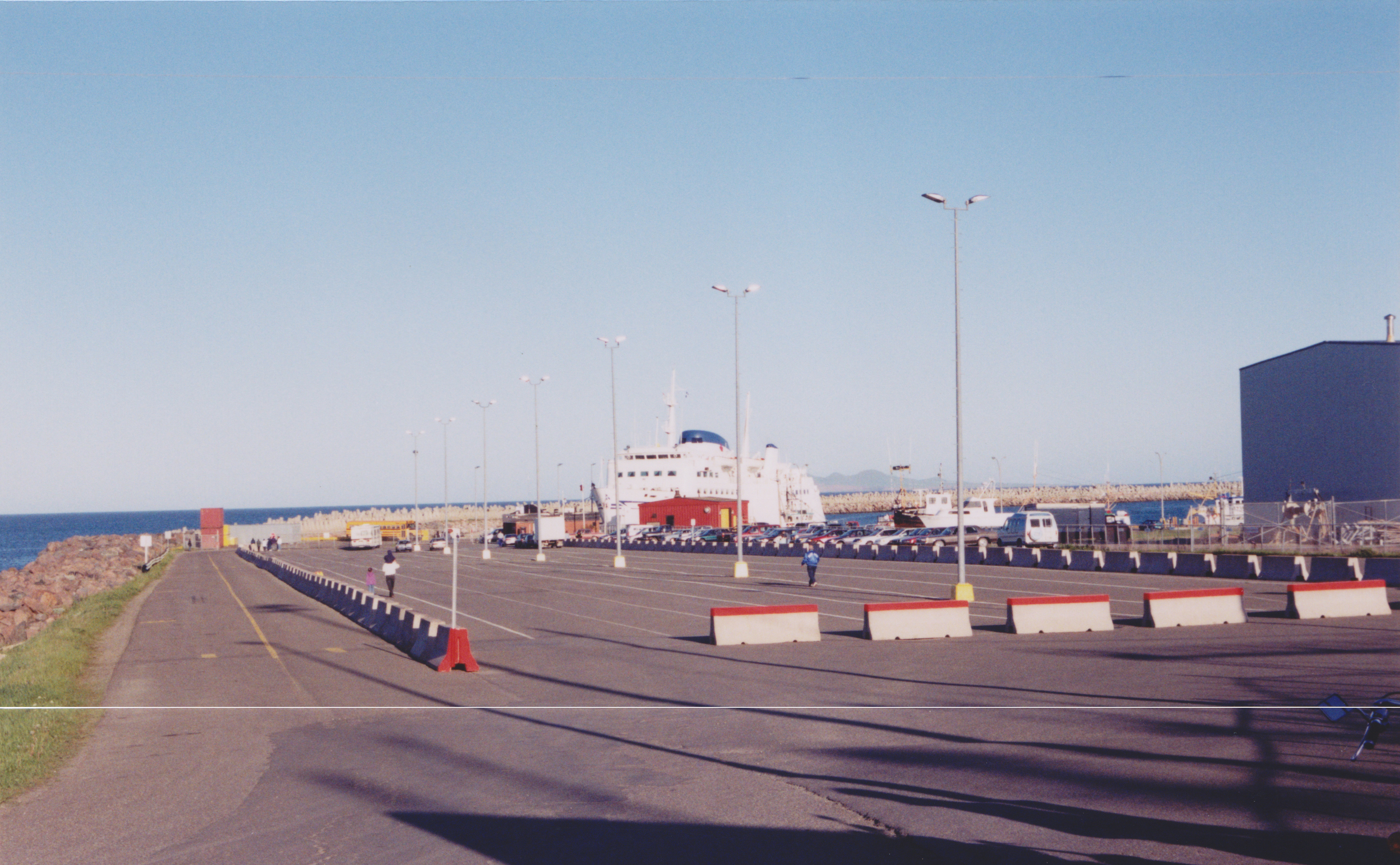
MV Lucy Maud Montgomery ferry, at Cap-aux-Meules, July 1996

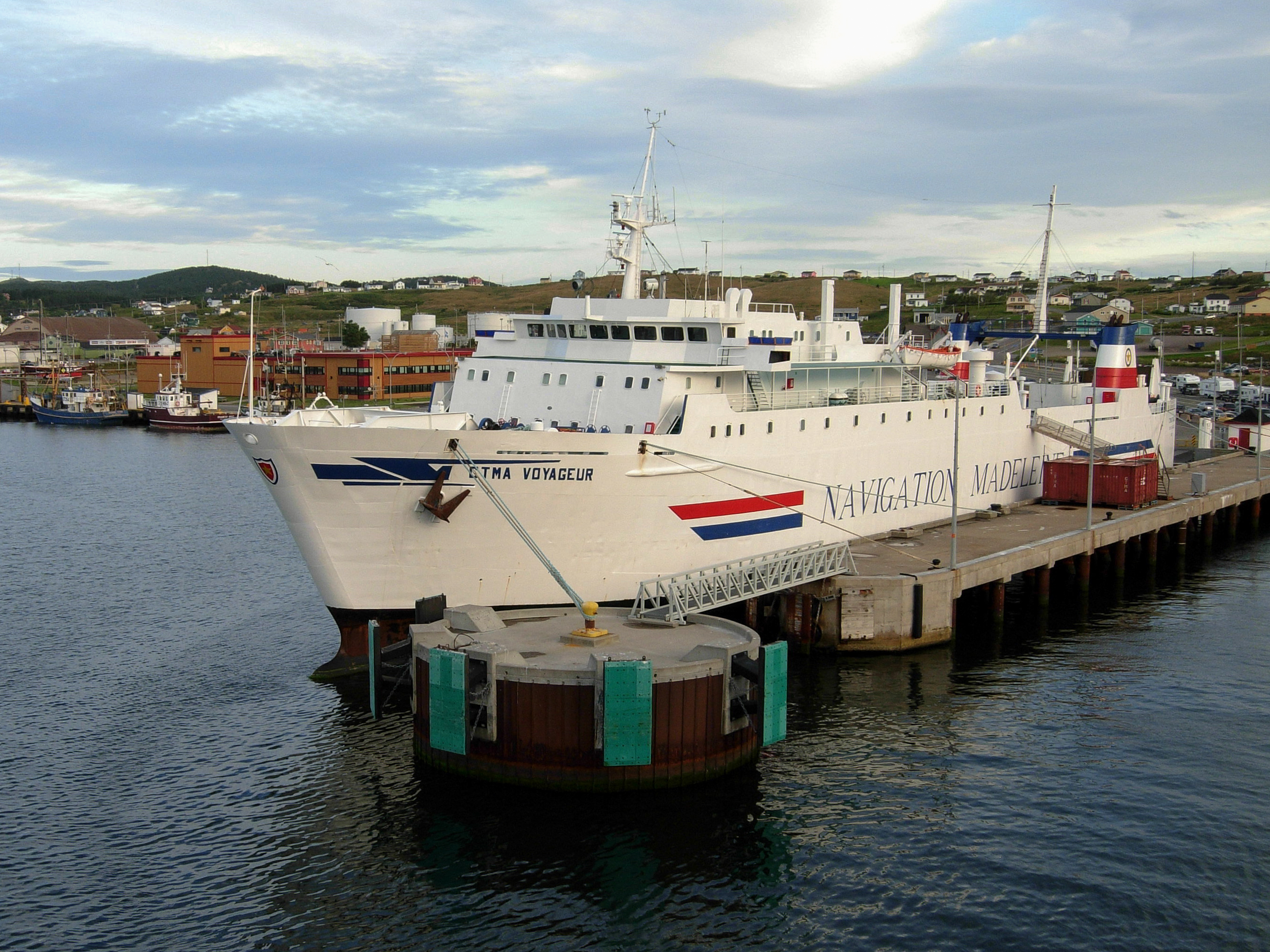
C.T.M.A. Voyageur, at Cap-aux-Meules, Îles-de-la-Madeleine, Canada - August 2006

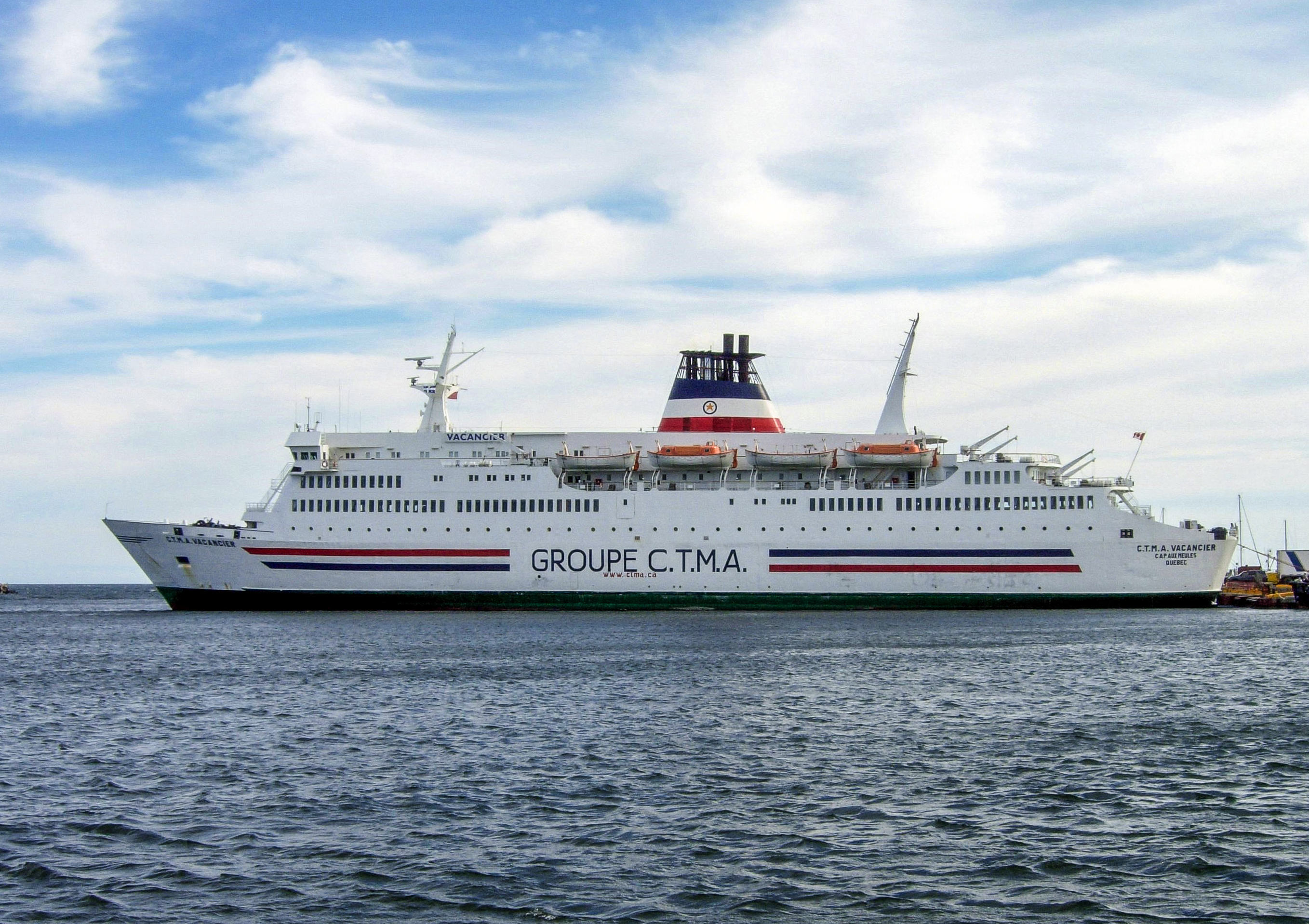
C.T.M.A. Vacancier, at Cap-aux-Meules - August 2006

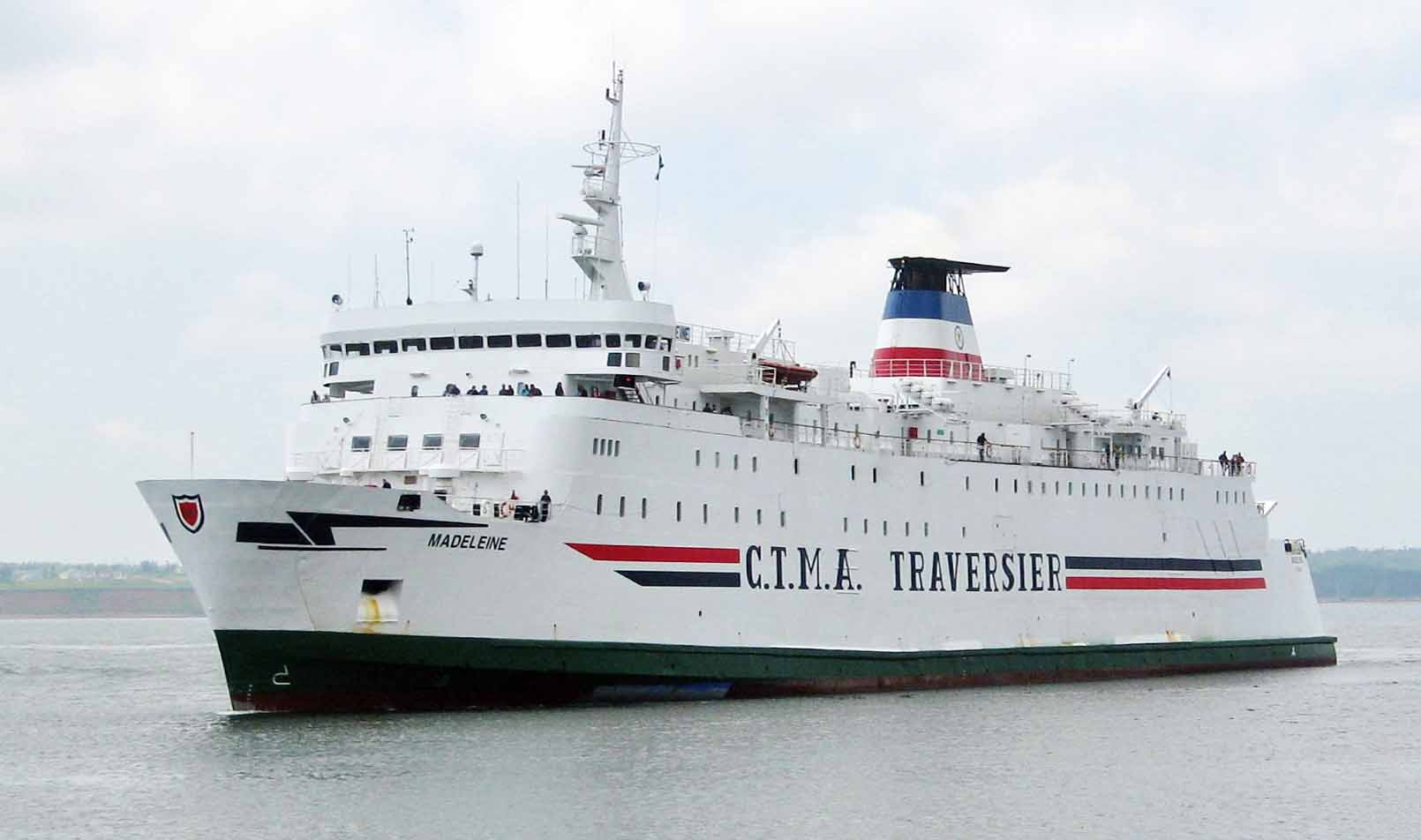
CTMA ferry, Madeleine, arriving at Souris, PEI, Canada - July 2008
