= MS Aallotar =

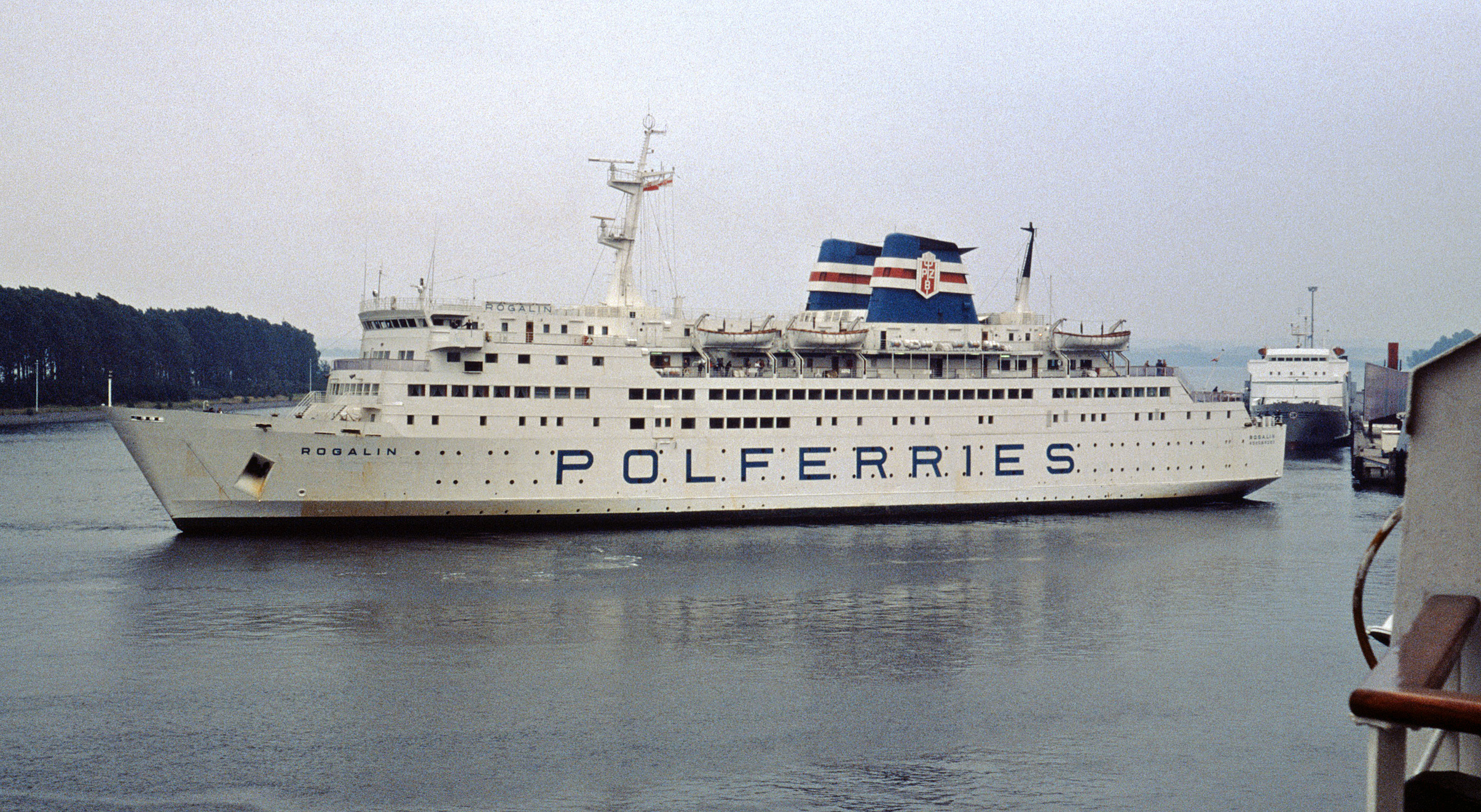
- Rogalin at Travemünde in August 1982

History
- Name: 1972–78: Aallotar; 1978–83: Rogalin; 1983: Edda; 1983–87: Rogalin; 1987–88: Celtic Pride; 1988–91 Rogalin; 1991–92 Celtic Pride; 1992–2003: Rogalin
- Owner: 1972–78: Finland Steamship Company; 1978–2003: Polferries
- Builder: Dubegion-Normandie S.A., Nantes, France
- Launched: 23 July 1971
- Completed: 1972
- Maiden voyage: 1972
- In service: 1972
- Out of service: 2003
- Identification: IMO number: 7114941
- Fate: Scrapped in 2003

General characteristics
- Tonnage: 7,800 GRT; 10,241 GT (after remeasurement, 1994)
- Length: 126.79 m (416 ft 0 in)
- Beam: 19.54 m (64 ft 1 in)
- Draught: 5.15 m (16 ft 11 in)
- Ice class: 1 A
- Propulsion: 2 × Pielstick 16PC2V-400 diesel engines; 11,936 kW (16,006 hp)
- Speed: 21 kn (39 km/h; 24 mph)
- Capacity: 1,000 passengers; 420 passenger beds; 146 cars or 20 trucks

MS Aallotar was a car-passenger ferry built in 1972 by Dubegion-Normandie S.A., Nantes, France for the Finland Steamship Company, who used her in traffic of the Silja Line marketing company. She was the first car/passenger ferry to operate between Helsinki and Stockholm, and the first ship to offer year-round service. She was later known under the names MS Rogalin, MS Edda and MS Celtic Pride. She was scrapped in 2004 in Aliağa, Turkey.

== Heyday ==
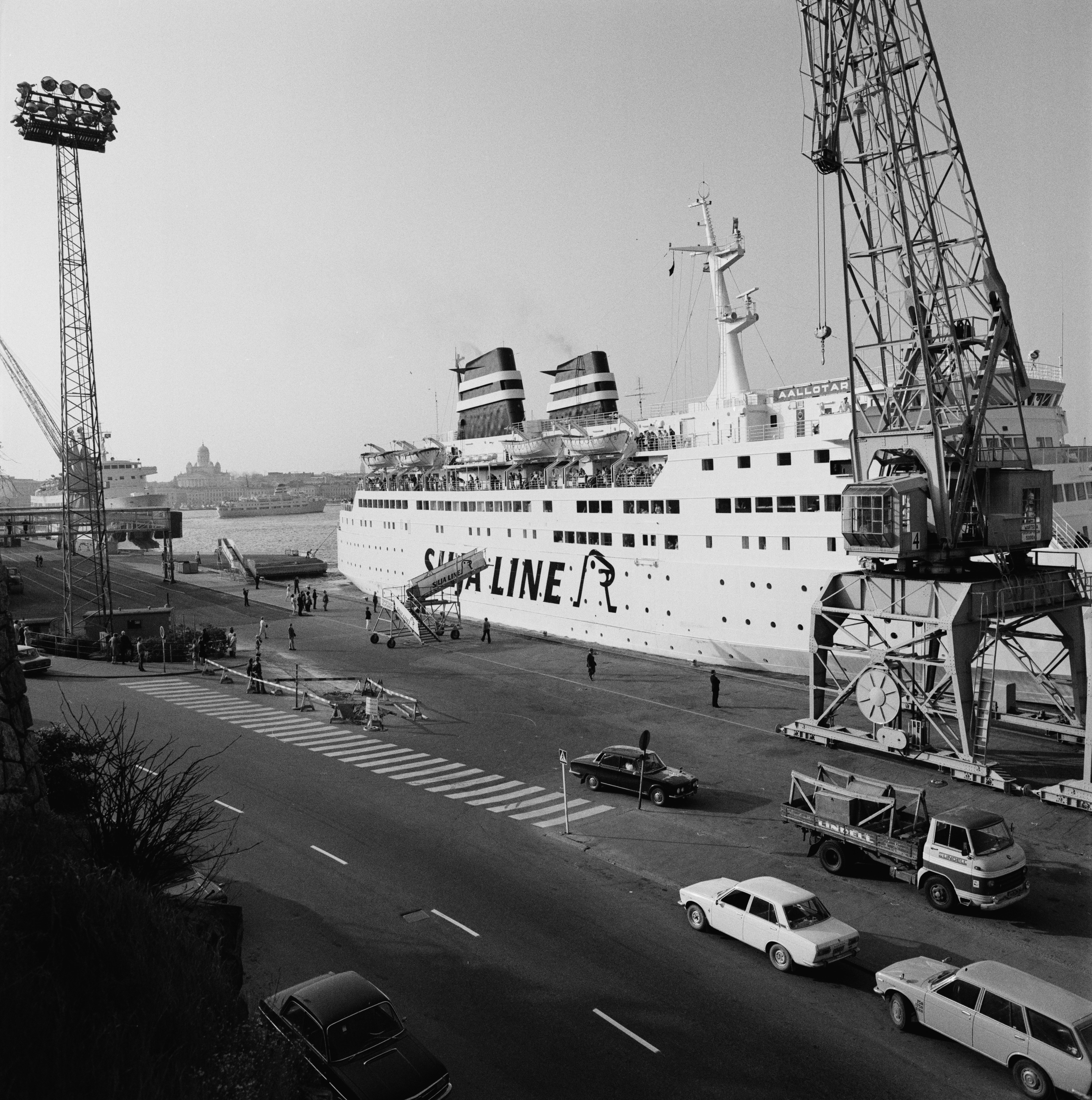
Aallotar at Helsinki

In 1970 the Finnish shipping company Oy Siljavarustamo - Siljarederiet Ab ordered two new carferries for Helsinki–Stockholm service from the French Dubegion-Normandie S.A. shipyard. During construction of the ships Silja's operations were reorganised, and the building contract for the first ship was transferred to Finland Steamship Company (FÅA). On 23 July 1971 the ship was christened MS Aallotar. She was delivered to FÅA on 17 February 1972, and on 29 February she was set in Silja Line traffic between Helsinki and Stockholm, becoming the first car/passenger ferry to operate on the route, and the first to operate the service around the year. In June she was joined in the route by her brand-new sister MS Svea Regina. In December 1972 she collided with a Swedish ice breaker in the Stockholm archipelago, but was spared serious damage.

The new ships proved the Helsinki–Stockholm route to be highly lucrative, and by 1973 Silja Line's owner companies decided to order three larger ferries to replace the Aallotar and Svea Regina, to be delivered in 1975, so the groundbreaking Aallotar's service on the route was to be short. On 7 August 1973 the Aallotar was chartered for a special cruise around the Porkkala archipelago for the Conference on Security and Co-operation in Europe. On 7 July 1975, after delivery of the new MS Wellamo, the Aallotar was transferred to Turku–Mariehamn–Norrtälje service. She proved unprofitable on this freight-oriented line, and in August 1976 the Aallotar was laid up, waiting for a potential buyer. No buyer was found and between June and August 1977 the Aallotar was back in active service, sailing between Turku and Stockholm. After this she was again laid up, but only for a short while as in October 1977 she was chartered to Polferries, who set her on traffic between Helsinki and Gdańsk, Poland, without a change of name.

== Rogalin, Edda and Celtic Pride ==
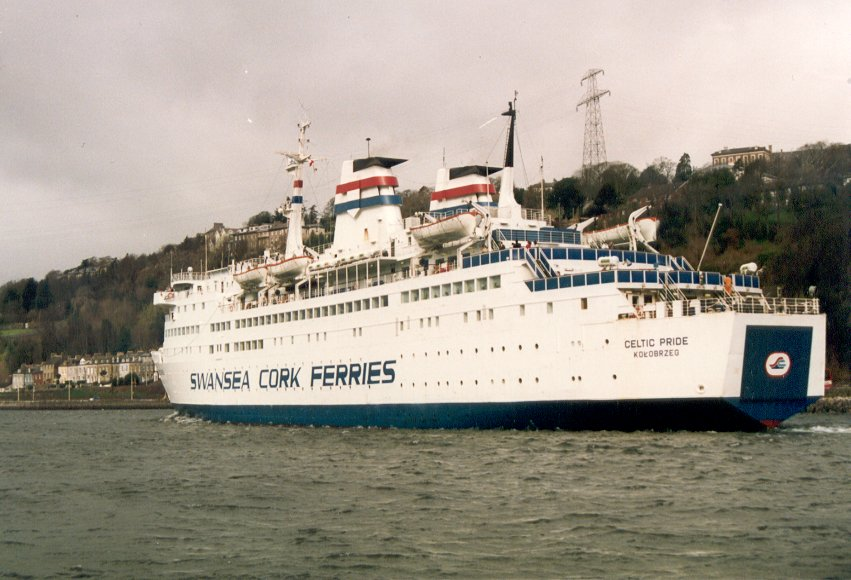
Celtic Pride

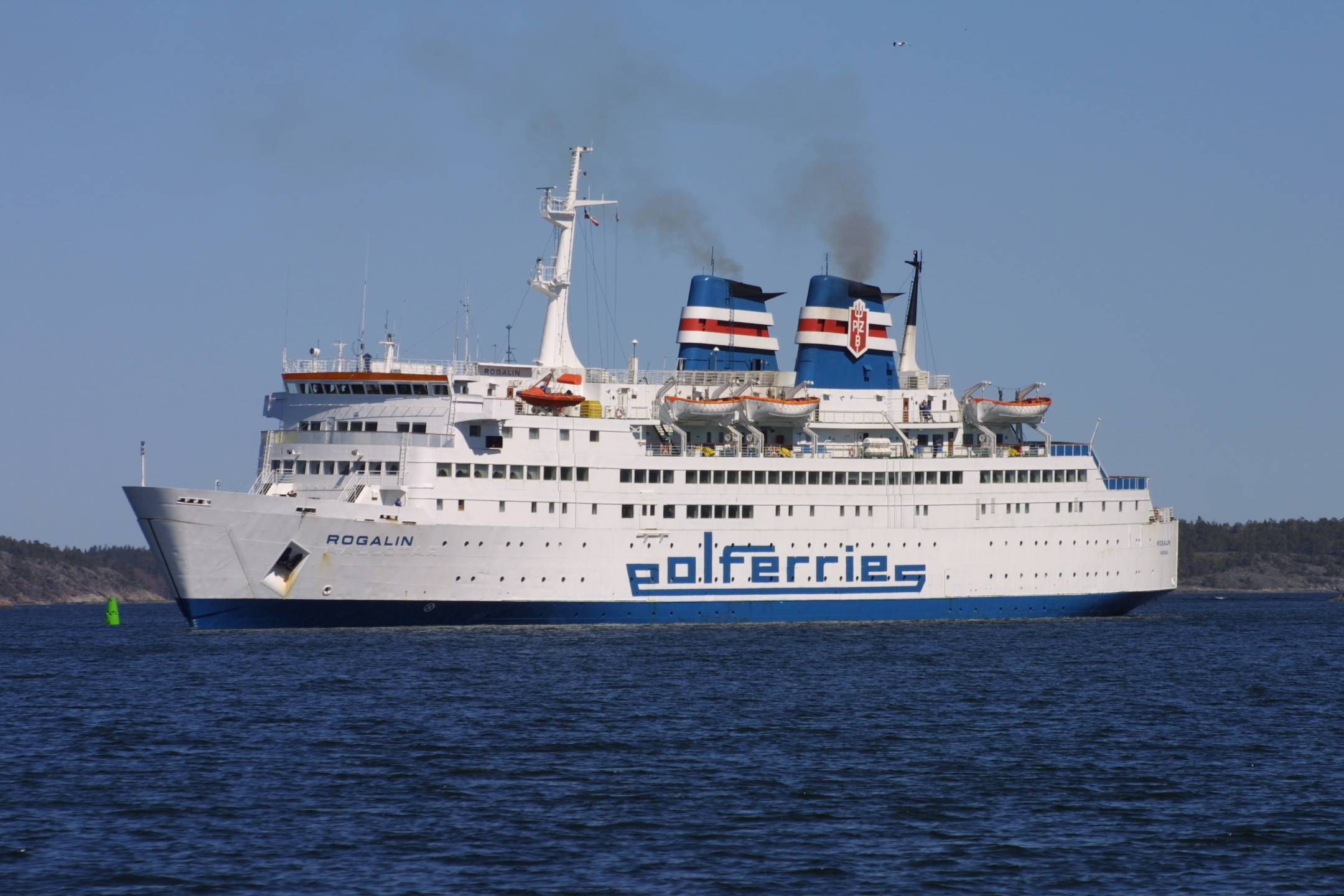
Rogalin at Nynäshamn in 2002

On 14 May 1978 Polferries bought the Aallotar from FÅA and renamed her MS Rogalin after a renowned village in Greater Poland. During the next four years she was used on the routes Helsinki–Gdańsk, Ystad–Świnoujście and Copenhagen–Świnoujście. In September 1979 the Rogalin collided with the Dutch tanker Coral Rubrum outside Porkkala. In May 1982 the Rogalin was transferred to Copenhagen–Travemünde service.

In May 1983 the Rogalin was chartered to the Icelandic company Faraskip until September of the same year. She was renamed M/S Edda and set in traffic between Reykjavík, Newcastle and Bremerhaven. After the charter ended she reverted to her old name and was again set in Polferries traffic. On 31 December 1985 she made a special cruise from Szczecin to London.

Between May and December 1987, and again between May and December 1988, the Rogalin was chartered to Swansea Cork Ferries for service between Swansea and Cork under the name MS Celtic Pride. Between the charters she returned again to the name Rogalin and was used in Polferries traffic. In March 1991 she was chartered to Swansea Cork Ferries for the third time, again under the name Celtic Pride. On the 12th of August 1992, a brother & sister aged 13 & 15 where found dead in their cabin during a routine sailing from Swansea to Cork due to being asphyxiated by fumes from the ship's toilet system caused by a leak in the sewage system. ( sourceThe charter ended in November 1992, and once again the ship returned to Polferries traffic under the name Rogalin. After this she was at least occasionally used on the route Gdańsk–Nynäshamn.

In July 1999 the Rogalin was reflagged to the Bahamas. From November 2002 onward she was used only on the route Ystad–Świnoujście. In July 2003 the 31-year-old ferry was taken out of service, laid up and put for sale. In October she was sold to Indian shipbreakers and on 25 November she arrived in Alang, India where she was scrapped.
