= MV Munster (1968) =

Ro Ro car ferry built in 1968

History
- Name: 1968-1981: Munster; 1983-1989: Farah In; 1991-2002: Tianpeng
- Operator: 1965-1981: B+I Line; 1981-2002: various
- Builder: Nobiskrug, Rendsburg
- Yard number: 657
- Launched: 25 January 1968
- Out of service: 2002
- Identification: IMO number: 6812522
- Fate: Scrapped 2002

General characteristics
- Tonnage: 4,007 GT
- Length: 110.22 metres (361.6 ft)
- Beam: 18.09 metres (59.4 ft)
- Draught: 4.5 metres (15 ft)
- Speed: 22 kn (41 km/h)
- Capacity: 1,000 passengers, 220 cars

MV Munster was built in 1968 and operated initially for the British and Irish Steam Packet Company (B+I Line). The c. 5000-ton ship (as built) had capacity for 1,000 passengers and 220 cars. The ship was also known as the Farah In and Tianpeng before being scrapped in 2002.

== History ==
The ship was initially ordered by the Scandinavian Lion Ferries but was purchased by B+I Line before completion for operations on the Dublin to Liverpool route. The original intended owners had specified a strengthened hull to operate through ice, and McNeill noted her as the only "ice-capable" regularly on the Irish Sea in her era. Sister ships of a broadly similar design were Prins Bertil, Gustav Vasa, Kronprins, Karl Gustav, Innisfallen|1969 and MV Leinster (1968); the latter two for B+I Line. Munster had no Sky lounge above the bridge which could identify her from her B+I sisters.

The top speed of 22 kn (41 km/h) from four diesel engines allowed the ship to make the daytime crossing from Dublin Port to Carriers' Dock, Liverpool in 7 hours. Bow and stern doors allowed a turnaround time of 1 hour. The ship was equipped with bow thrusters and stabilizers.

From the later 1970s the ship began to diverge from the Liverpool—Dublin route, with charters to Brittany Ferries and Egersund Thyborøn as well as use on south Irish Sea routes. From 1983 she was sold and renamed Farah In and used on Aqaba — Suez.

The ship was sold to Dalian Steamship of China in 1991 and renamed Tianpeng. It was scrapped in 2002.
