= MS Madeleine =

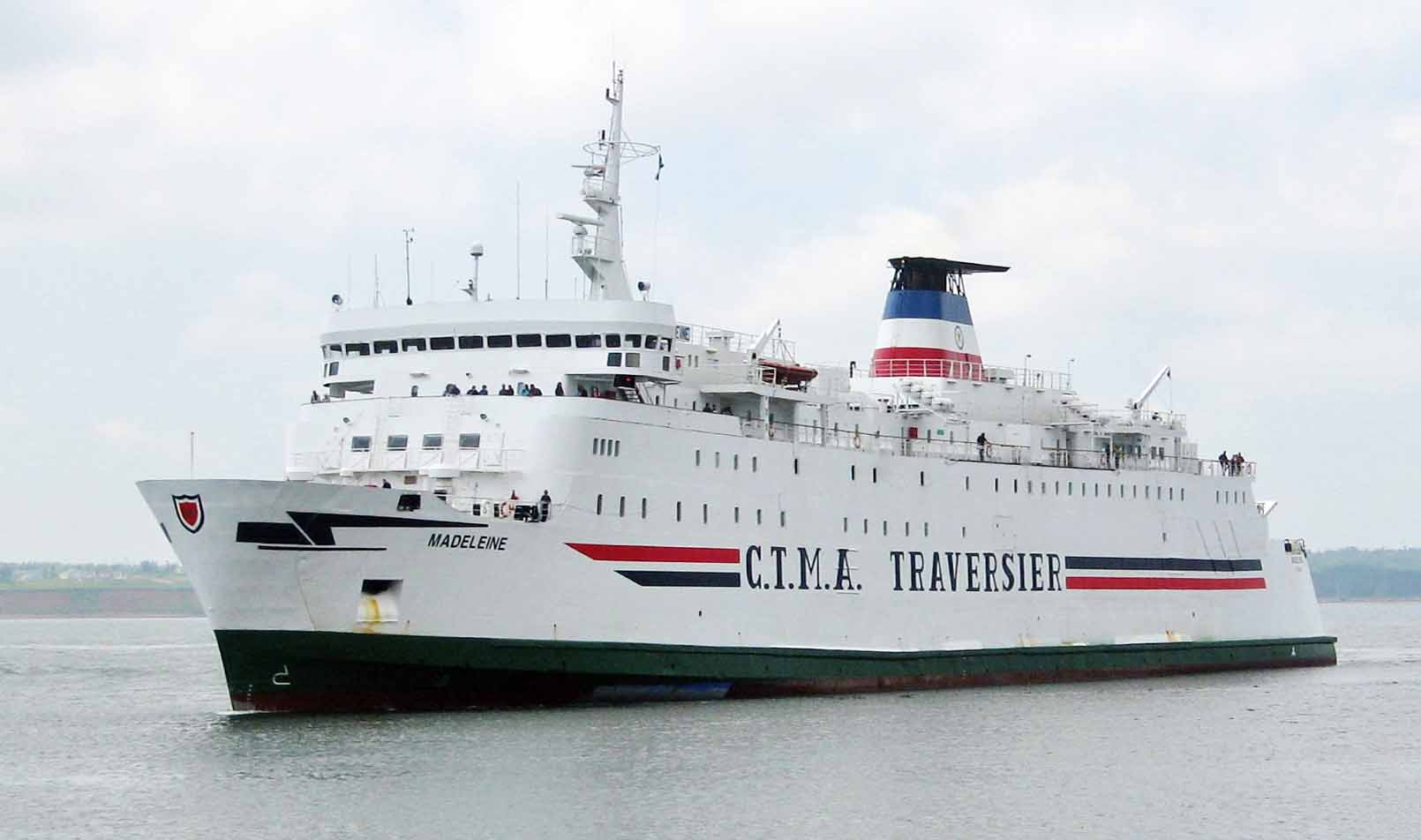
- Madeleine arriving at Souris

History
- Name: 1981–1993: Leinster; 1993–1996: Isle of Inishmore; 1996–1997: Isle of Inishturk; 1997–2021: Madeleine
- Operator: 1981–1995: B&I Line; 1995–1997: Irish Ferries; 1997–2021: CTMA
- Port of registry: 1981–1997: Dublin, Ireland; 1997–2021: Ottawa, Canada
- Builder: Verolme Cork Dockyard, Cork, Ireland
- Yard number: 979
- Launched: 7 November 1980
- Out of service: 2021
- Identification: IMO number: 7915228
- Fate: Scrapped

General characteristics (as built)
- Tonnage: 6,807 GRT; 1,310 t DWT
- Length: 122.05 m (400 ft 5 in)
- Beam: 18.83 m (61 ft 9 in)
- Draught: 4.99 m (16 ft 4 in)
- Decks: 8
- Installed power: 4 × MaK 8M551AK diesels
- Propulsion: 2 x Controllable pitch propellers
- Speed: 20 kn (37.04 km/h)
- Capacity: 1,500 passengers; 534 berths; 326 cars

MS Madeleine was a car/passenger ferry owned and operated by Coopérative de Transport Maritime et Aérien between Souris and Cap-aux-Meules. The ship was originally named Leinster and owned and operated by B&I Line. The ship later sailed with Irish Ferries as Isle of Inishturk as well as operating under the name Isle of Inishmore.

== History ==
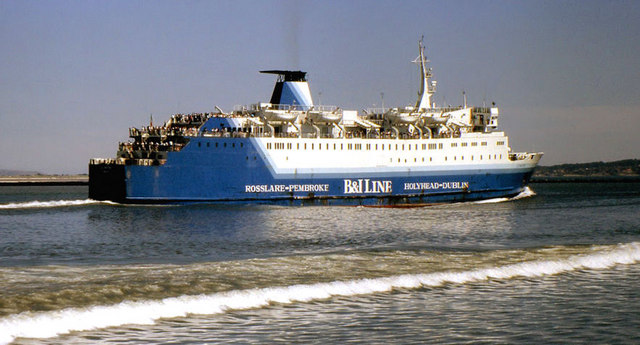
Leinster departing Dublin in July 1989

Madeleine was built in 1981 as Leinster for the B&I Line overnight Dublin – Liverpool route. Following heavy losses the overnight Dublin – Liverpool route closed in 1988. Leinster transferred to the shorter Dublin – Holyhead route until 1993 when she was transferred to the Pembroke Dock – Rosslare route, for this role she was renamed Isle of Inishmore.

In 1995 Isle of Inishmore received the new Irish Ferries livery following the privatization of B&I Line. The ship was renamed Isle of Inishturk a year later to free the name for a new vessel under construction in the Netherlands. The new Isle of Inishmore was delivered in 1997 enabling Isle of Innisfree to replace Isle of Inishturk on the Pembroke Dock – Rosslare route.

After a few months laid up, Isle of Inishturk was sold to Coopérative de Transport Maritime et Aérien (CTMA) and renamed Madeleine. Prior to entering service the lifeboats were removed and replaced with a Marine evacuation system. In 2006 Madeleine was rebuilt to comply with the latest safety regulations. This included the addition of large sponsons to the stern.

After talks with Davie Shipbuilding to build a replacement ferry, on 16 September 2020 the Government of Canada announced that it had purchased Villa de Teror for $155 million to replace the Madeleine on CTMA's route between Souris, Prince Edward Island, and Cap-aux-Meules. The replacement ferry entered service in the summer of 2021 as Madeleine II. This is intended as an interim measure, as a newly-built vessel is planned to enter service on the route in 2026.
