= Cap-aux-Meules =

Village in Les Îles-de-la-Madeleine, Quebec, Canada

Coordinates: 47°22′55″N 61°51′40″W

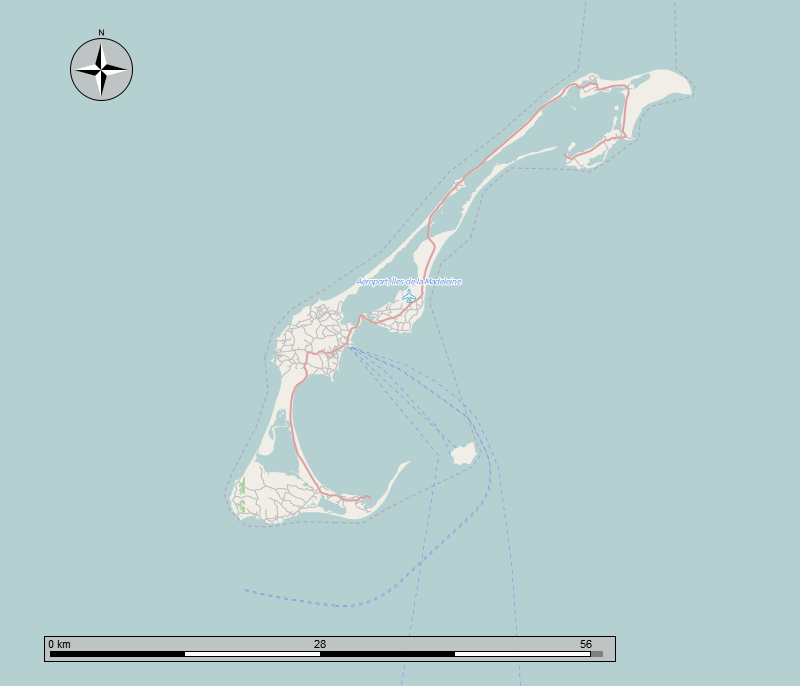
Map of Cap-aux-Meules (near the centre of the image where the blue ferry lines converge).

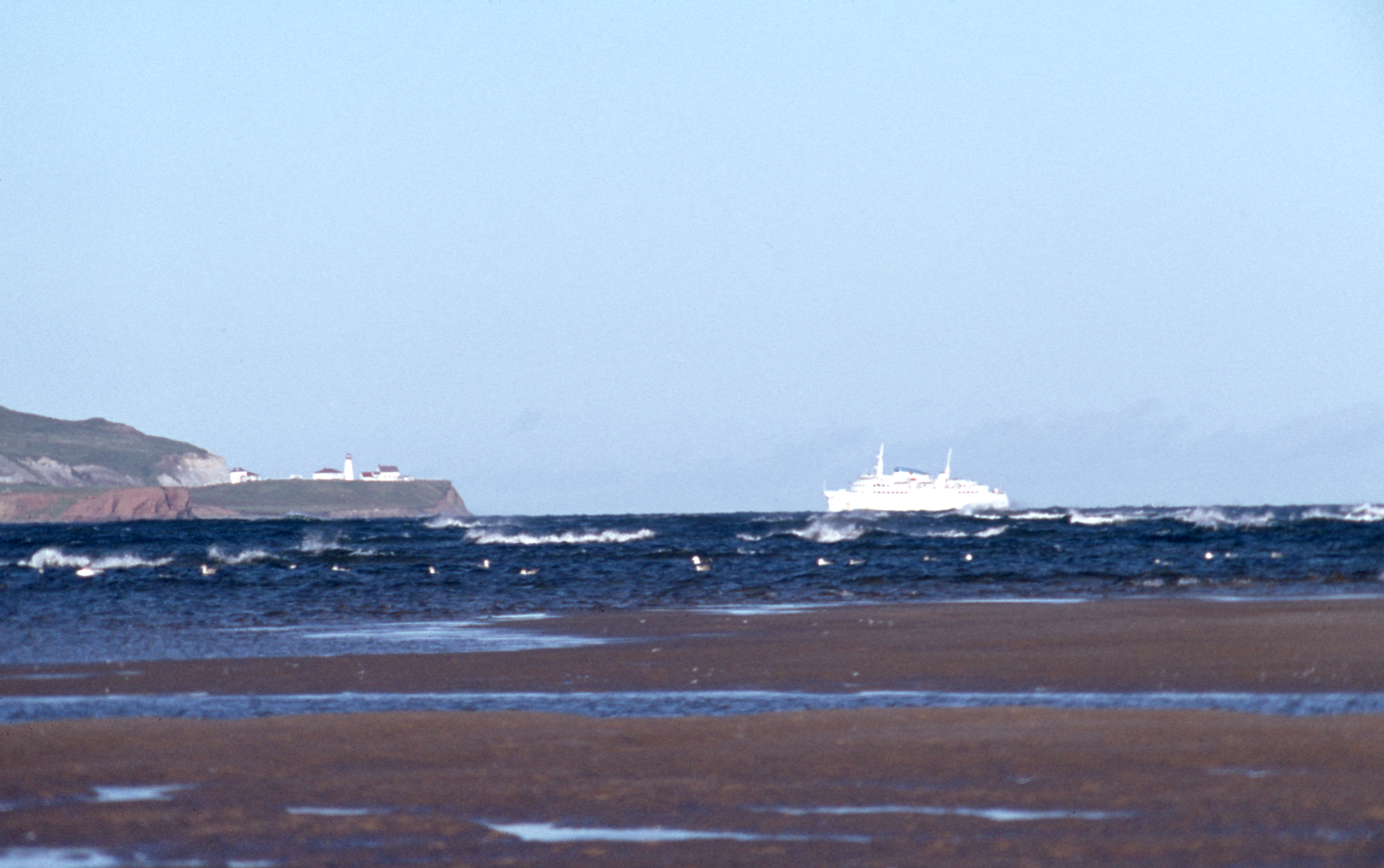
The MV Lucy Maud Montgomery ferry, approaching the Cap-aux-Meules ferry terminal

Cap-aux-Meules (French pronunciation: [kap o møl], "Grindstone") is a former village, now a sector of the municipality of Les Îles-de-la-Madeleine, Quebec. It is located on Cap aux Meules Island (Grindstone Island), part of the Magdalen Islands archipelago, in the Gulf of St. Lawrence, Quebec, Canada.

The sheltered port of Cap-aux-Meules is an important fishing harbour, as well as a commercial cargo and ferry terminal. The ferry company, Coopérative de Transport Maritime et Aérien (CTMA), operates a ferry service to Souris, Prince Edward Island, as well as a year-round cargo service to Matane and Montreal, Quebec.

The village is home to the government services offices of Société de l'assurance automobile du Québec (SAAQ), Transports Quebec, the Ministry of Municipal Affairs and Housing (MAMH), the Ministry of Agriculture, Fisheries and Food (MAPAQ) and the Ministry of the Environment and the Fight Against Climate Change (MELCCFP), also, Parks Canada, Transport Canada, Canadian Coast Guard, and Fisheries and Oceans Canada.

Located on île du Cap aux Meules (Grindstone Island) the site was settled as early as the 19th century. Before the 2002 amalgamation, it was the Magdalen Islands' smallest community in land area, but because of its location at the centre of the archipelago, it has become the most important business centre of the islands and, as such, was named "Capital of the Islands". The ferry servicing Cap-aux-Meules to Souris, Prince Edward Island constitutes the archipelago's only port of entry by sea.

The name of the community is associated to the grindstone quarry located on the island. Its population was 1,685 as of 2006.

== Waterway ==
Ports of the Gulf of St. Lawrence, on the Côte-Nord Shore: Blanc-Sablon, Harrington Harbor, Natashquan, Havre-Saint-Pierre, Mingan, Port-Menier (Anticosti Island), Cap-aux-Meules (Îles-de-la-Madeleine).

On Cap aux Meules Island

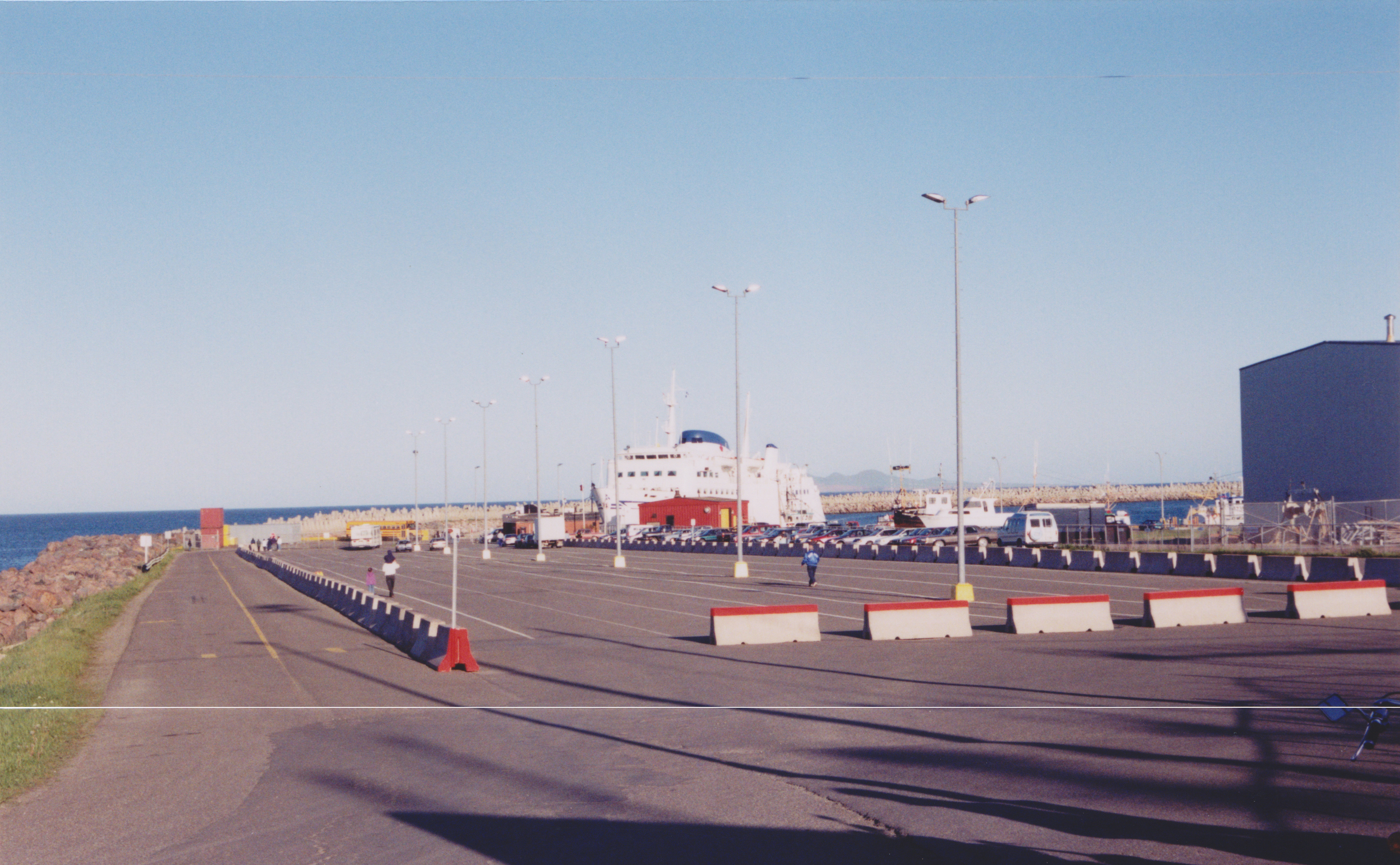
MV Lucy Maud Montgomery ferry, at port June 1996

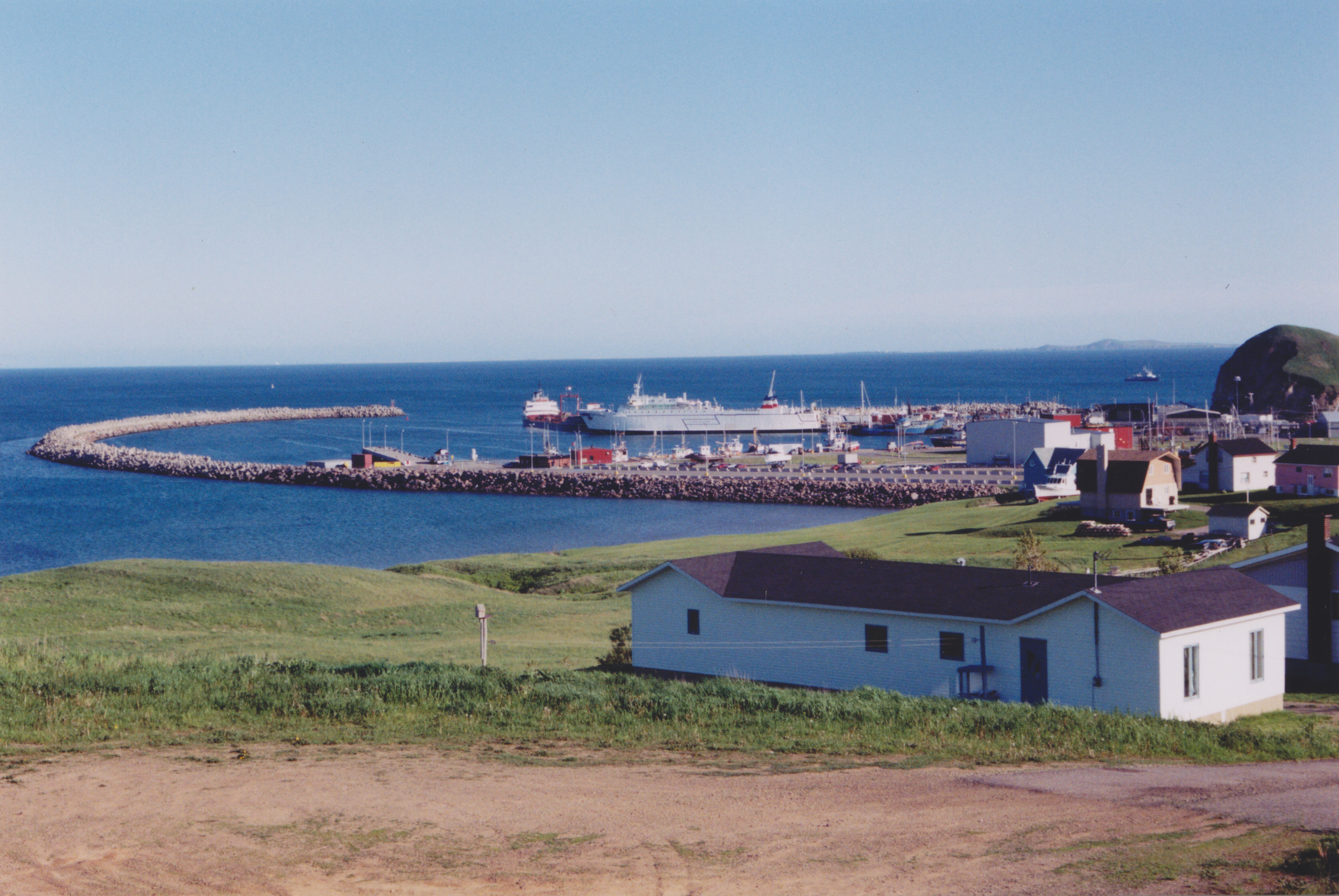
Ships moored at the dock

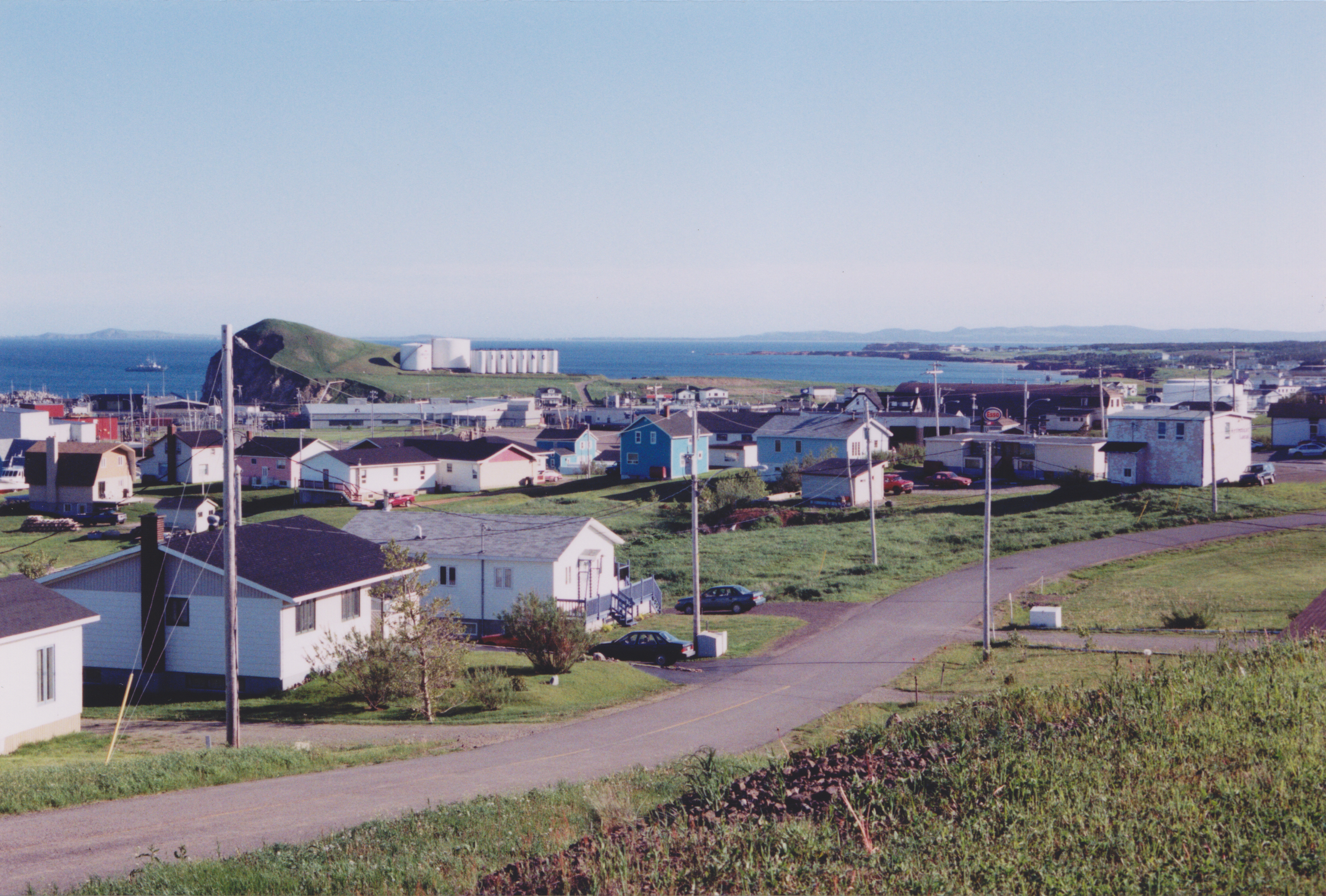
Chemin Principal (Quebec Route 199)
