= British and Irish Steam Packet Company =

Irish steam packet and passenger ferry company

British & Irish Steam Packet Company
- Logo

- House flag
- Industry: Shipping
- Founded: 1836
- Defunct: 1995
- Fate: Rebranded as Irish Ferries
- Headquarters: Dublin, Ireland
- Area served: Irish Sea
- Services: Passenger transportation Freight transportation
- Parent: 1965–1992: Government of Ireland; 1992–1995: ICG

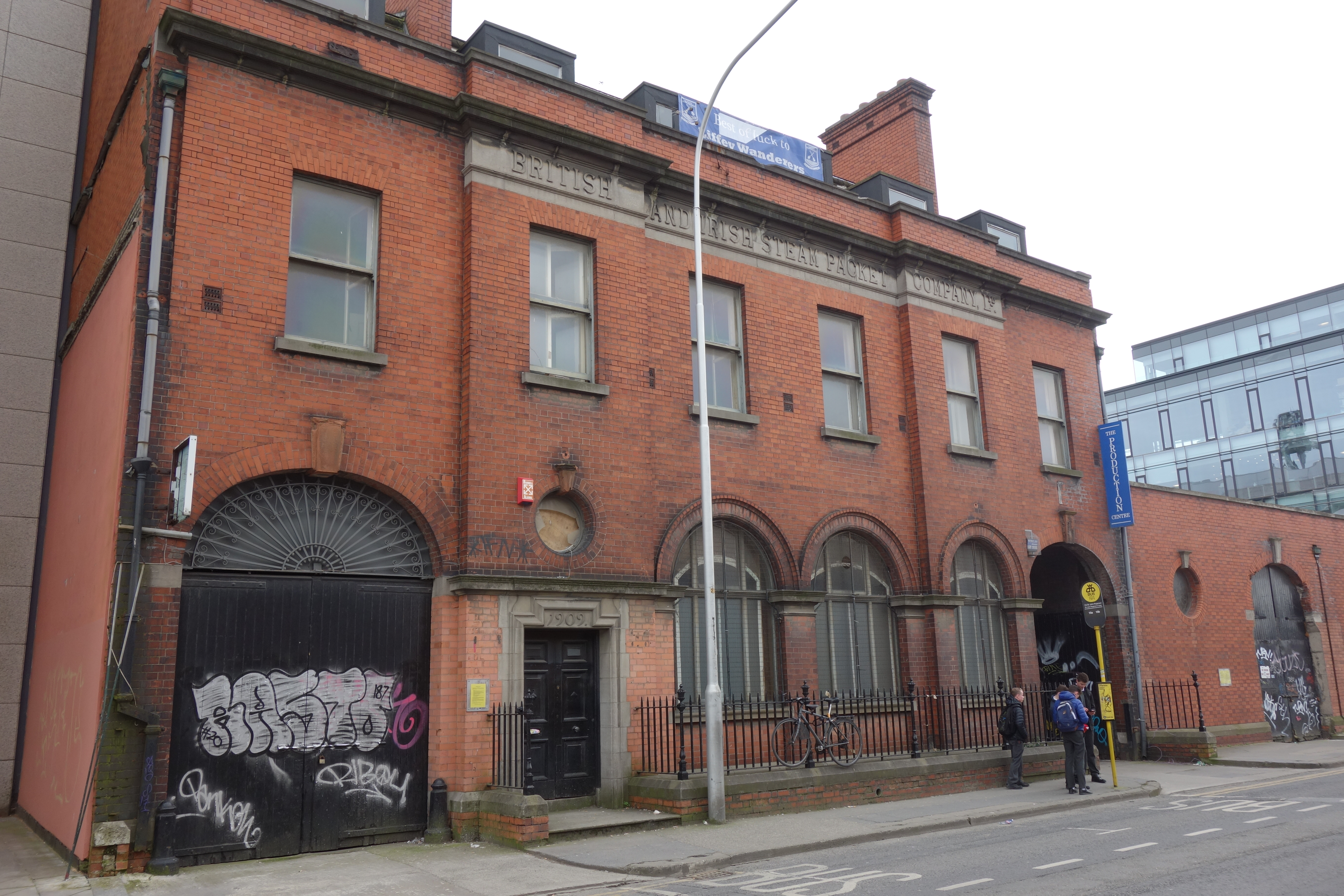
British & Irish Steampacket Company Office Building at 27 Sir John Rogerson's Quay which still bears the company name

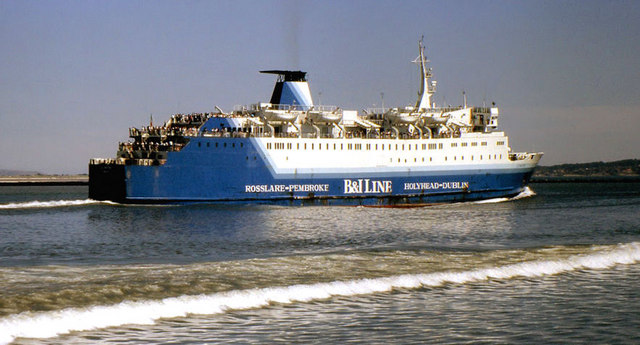
Leinster departing Dublin in 1989

The British and Irish Steam Packet Company Limited was a steam packet and passenger ferry company operating between ports in Ireland and in Great Britain between 1836 and 1992. It was latterly popularly called the B&I, and branded as B&I Line.

The company took over the business of the City of Dublin Steam Packet Company.

== Private company ==
The B&I was established in Dublin in 1836 with an initial fleet of paddle steamers by a group of Dublin businessmen including James Jameson, Arthur Guinness and Francis Carlton. The company was based on Eden Quay until it moved to No. 46 East Wall in 1860. The fleet changed to iron in the 1840s and 1850s to ply on the company routes of Falmouth–Torquay–Southampton–Portsmouth and London together with Dublin–Wexford–Waterford. The company acquired the London service of the Waterford Steamship Company in 1870 by which they dominated this route.

The controlling owner of the B&I was the Liverpool Shipping Company. It was taken over by the Kylsant Royal Mail Company in 1917 and renamed Coast Lines which by the end of 1917 held all the shares in the B&I. Among the operations of this group were,

- Burns and Laird
- City of Cork Steam Packet
- The Dublin and Lancashire Shipping Co. (1922)
- Dundalk and Lancashire Shipping Co. (1922)
- Dundalk and Newry Steam Packet Company (1926)
- City of Dublin Steam Packet Company, founded 1823 (1920)
- The Belfast Steamship Company (1919)
- Tedcastle and McCormack of Dublin (1919)

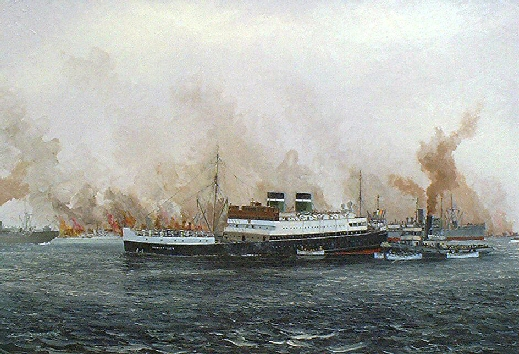
Innisfallen sunk by a mine in River Mersey, 21 December 1940, shown here as passengers escape on lifeboats, all passengers survived, four crew died Oil by Kenneth King, Maritime Institute of Ireland

The 1930s was a difficult period for the B&I, and Coast Lines offered the Irish Government a share in the company but they declined. This was regretted on the outbreak of World War II, when Coast Lines withdrew most of the vessels and placed them at the disposal of the British authorities. During the war, the company sustained casualties with the separate losses of two vessels in Liverpool in 1940: the Innisfallen, and Munster sunk by a mine.

B&I had offices and owned several buildings (9 North Wall Quay - Cartage and Motor Haulage Department, 12 North Wall Quay - further larger offices) and a yard at North Wall Quay which bore its name in large letters and were demolished in the 1990s to make way for the offices of Citibank as well as at 27 Sir John Rogerson's Quay which bore its name and are still standing as a protected structure as of 2020.

== Nationalisation ==
B&I was taken over by the Irish Government in 1965. It had ten passenger and cargo vessels, many built in the late 1940s. The new management commenced a major programme of modernisation, launching the car ferries MV Munster (1968), Innisfallen and Leinster (1969). The Munster and Leinster plied the Dublin–Liverpool route and the new Innisfallen out of Cork changed from Fishguard to Swansea in 1969. The company was also operating new freight ships.

On 25 April 1980 a jetfoil service from Dublin to Liverpool started but was withdrawn as it was not a commercial success. The company ran into major financial problems in 1981, this and labour disputes persisted into the early 1992 when the company was privatised and taken over by the Irish Continental Group.

== Bibliography ==
- Smyth, Hazel P. (1984). The B & I Line: A History of the British and Irish Steam Packet Company. Gill & Macmillan. ISBN 0717113329.
