= MS James Joyce =

2006 ferry

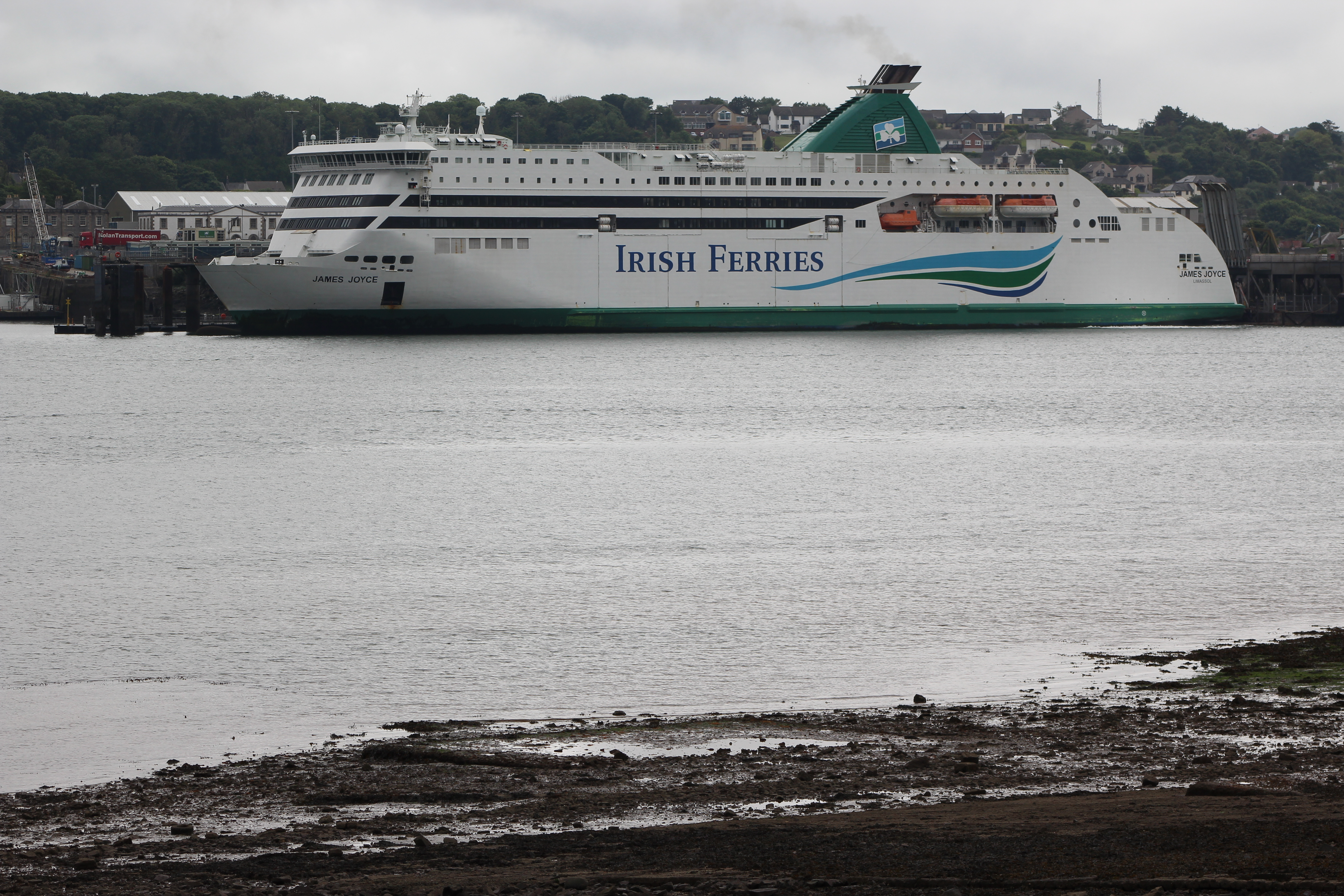

History
- Name: Star (2007–2023); Oscar Wilde (2023–2024); James Joyce (2024–2025); Star I (2025); James Joyce (2025–present)
- Owner: Tallink (2007–2025); Irish Continental Group (2025–present)
- Operator: Tallink (2007–2023); Irish Ferries (2023–February 2025); Tallink (February–May 2025); Irish Ferries (from May 2025 onward)
- Port of registry: Limassol, Cyprus
- Route: Dublin - Holyhead
- Ordered: 1 August 2005
- Builder: Aker Finnyards Helsinki Shipyard, Finland
- Yard number: 1356
- Laid down: 30 May 2006
- Launched: 23 November 2006
- Christened: 23 November 2006
- Acquired: 10 March 2007
- Maiden voyage: 2007
- In service: 12 April 2007
- Identification: Call sign: ESCJ; IMO number: 9364722; MMSI number: 276672000
- Status: In service

General characteristics
- Type: Fast ropax ferry
- Tonnage: 36,249 GT; 3,500 DWT
- Length: 187.00 m (613 ft 6 in)
- Beam: 27.70 m (90 ft 11 in)
- Draught: 6.50 m (21 ft 4 in)
- Ice class: 1 A Super
- Propulsion: 4 × MaK diesels; combined 48,000 kW (64,000 hp)
- Speed: 27 kn (50.0 km/h; 31.1 mph)
- Capacity: 600 passengers; 124 cabins; 450 cars; 2,380 lanemeters

MS James Joyce is a fast Ro-Pax cruiseferry operated by Irish Ferries; on the Dublin to Holyhead route. She was built as Star at Aker Finnyards Helsinki Shipyard, Finland for Tallink and entered service on their Helsinki to Tallinn service on 12 April 2007. She was sold to Irish Continental Group in May 2025 after a brief 20-month charter with Irish Ferries between 2023 and 2025.

== Specifications ==
The ship's design is heavily based on that of the Seafrance Rodin-class ferry, built by Aker Finnyards in 2001.

== Construction and career ==
=== Tallink (2007–23) ===
Star was the first fast ferry capable of year-round service used on the Helsinki–Tallinn route. The green external livery of the ship was according to Tallink promotional material "meant to reflect the environmentally friendly aspects of the ship's design". Star operated three daily departures from both Helsinki and Tallinn, each crossing taking two hours. In Tallink marketing, Star was often referred to as "Tallink Star". The ship's planned original delivery date was 5 April 2007, but this was postponed until 12 April 2007, owing to problems with the main engines.

During the COVID-19 outbreak crisis the ship was assigned to a government emergency service between Paldiski, Estonia, and Sassnitz, Germany to ease the transportation of goods between Estonia and Central Europe. Poland had closed its borders and required health declarations from truck drivers which introduced long truck queues on its borders and slowed transportation.

=== Irish Ferries (2024–25) ===
On 6 April 2023, Irish Ferries announced it was chartering Star from Tallink for 20 months, with possible extensions of 2+2 years, and an eventual possibility of purchase. The ship was renamed Oscar Wilde and was initially positioned on the Rosslare – Pembroke route, replacing the also chartered Greek ferry Blue Star 1.

On 31 January 2024 she was replaced on the route from Rosslare by Norbay, allowing Oscar Wilde to be deployed from 11 February 2024 on the company's two primary services from Dublin, sailing to Cherbourg, France on one weekend rotation and to Holyhead, Wales for the rest of the week. After new chartered ships entered service with Irish Ferries, Oscar Wilde was renamed James Joyce in May 2024.

The initial 20-month charter ended in January 2025 with the first of the possible extensions not exercised. The ship sailed to Damen repair shipyard Dunkirk before being handed back to Tallink and being renamed MS Star.

=== Return to Tallink (2025) ===
On 24 January 2025, Tallink announced that the vessel would enter service on 9 February 2025 on the Paldiski to Kapellskär route. The press release shows Star in a different iteration of the Tallink livery to her original period operating on the Tallinn to Helsinki route.

=== Return to Irish Ferries (2025–) ===
On 2 April 2025, Irish Continental Group released a joint statement with Tallink stating they had reached a deal to purchase Star I. She will be redeployed on the Dublin - Holyhead route, initially replacing Isle of Inisheer on the route during May 2025.
