= Isle of Inishmore =

Isle of Inishmore may refer to:

- Inishmore, the largest of the Aran Islands off the west coast of Ireland
- MS Isle of Inishmore (1980), a ferry operated by B&I Line and Irish Ferries 1993-1996
- MS Isle of Inishmore (1996), a cruiseferry operated by Irish Ferries since 1997
