= Killing of Keane Mulready-Woods =

Crime in Ireland, January 2020

Keane Mulready-Woods
- Born: 5 February 2002; Drogheda, Ireland
- Died: 12 January 2020 (aged 17); Drogheda, Ireland
- Cause of death: Homicide
- Body discovered: 13–15 January 2020 (various remains)
- Known for: Murder victim

Keane Mulready-Woods of Drogheda, County Louth, was an Irish teenager who disappeared on 12 January 2020. Mulready-Woods, a young member of the Price/Maguire gang involved in the Drogheda feud, was kidnapped, killed and mutilated before parts of his body were disposed of around Ireland. Parts of his dismembered body were found in Coolock, County Dublin, with more being found in Drumcondra in a burnt out car, while his torso was found in Drogheda a year after his murder. Dublin criminal Robbie Lawlor was the chief suspect for the killing, but was shot dead in April 2020 before he could be charged.

== Background ==
=== Keane Mulready-Woods ===
Keane Mulready-Woods grew up in Drogheda and attended St Oliver’s Community College before dropping out. The son of Price/Maguire gang member Barry Woods and his wife Elizabeth, he had three brothers and one sister. He was a fan of motocross, owned his own scrambler and was described by his cousin as the "best scrambler rider in Drogheda".

Mulready-Woods was involved with a faction in the Drogheda feud led by Cornelius Price and Owen Maguire. He first came to the attention of youth workers at the age of 14 after being accused of assaulting another boy, while by 15 he had been alleged to have pointed a gun at a manager in a shop in an incident caught on CCTV. His role in the gang was to threaten those with unpaid drug debts. A year prior to his murder, he had petrol bombed a house belonging to the mother of a boy who owed money to the gang; he was given a four-month suspended sentence for this.

=== Robbie Lawlor ===
Robbie Lawlor (1985 - 4 April 2020) was a criminal figure from Coolock in County Dublin. Primarily a hitman and a killer-for-cash, Lawlor was suspected of a number of murders, including the murder of Ken Finn in 2018. Finn had been the right-hand man of a Dublin crime boss identifiable by media sources only as "Mr. Big". Mr. Big is a major Dublin criminal suspected of orchestrating several murders, including that of Alan Ryan.

Lawlor had lived in County Meath and was heavily involved in organised crime, including the Drogheda feud, which he became involved in through his brother-in-law, Richie Carberry.

After being released from custody having been found not guilty of threatening to murder his ex-girlfriend, her mother and her new partner, Lawlor was filmed being mugged by a group of teenagers; the group, suspected to have included Mulready-Woods, stole Lawlor's gym bag including a pair of flip-flops, and photos of the assailants wearing these were posted online.

Lawlor was shot dead in Belfast on 4 April 2020; he had been warned by Gardaí that his life was in danger before he went to Belfast.

== Disappearance ==
Eight days prior to his disappearance, Gardaí had warned Mulready-Woods that his life was under threat.

Mulready-Woods was last seen around 6 pm on 12 January 2020 at St Dominic's Bridge in Drogheda. He had recently called his mother to ask her to leave money out for his taxi home later that evening. His sister posted a message on Facebook the afternoon of the following day, asking if anyone had seen him.

=== Human remains found ===
On 13 January 2020, a local found a sports bag with human remains at the junction of Moatview Gardens and Moatview Drive in Coolock. The bag had been thrown from a dark coloured passing car. The remains were found around 10pm. The bag also contained a pair of flip flops, which was believed to be a warning from Lawlor referencing his mugging the previous month. Further human remains, believed to be a head and hands, were found in a burnt-out car in Trinity Terrace, Drumcondra in the early hours of Wednesday 15 January. On the night of 15 January, Gardaí confirmed that DNA tests had confirmed that the limbs found in Coolock were those of Keane Mulready-Woods. On Friday 17 January Gardaí confirmed that the partial remains found in the car had been identified as those of Keane Mulready-Woods.

Mulready-Woods's severed torso was finally found on a site next to Rathmullen Park in Drogheda on 1 April 2021. A DNA test confirmed the torso belonged to Mulready-Woods.

== Aftermath ==
=== Garda investigation ===
Gardaí began investigating links between the death of Mulready-Woods and the Drogheda Feud.

In the early hours of 20 January, a main suspect in the case was arrested. Gardaí had watched both Dublin Airport and Dublin Port closely because they feared he would flee to England. He was expected to appear in court on charges of breaching bail conditions. The arrest warrant is not related to the death of Keane Mulready-Woods, but to a separate case. He is connected to a crime feud in Drogheda.

Gardaí suspect that the killers intended to dump the remains in front of the homes of the leaders of the gang the teenager was associated with as a warning. They also suspect that this plan was abandoned after those with the remains nearly encountered Gardaí.

Gardaí believe the deceased was killed in Drogheda and have searched the banks of the River Boyne near a house where they suspect he was killed.

Prosecutions have proven to be difficult if remains of the deceased are not found or only partial remains have been found. It has been done in the murder of Elaine O'Hara but Gardaí described that case as an exception and that prosecutions in such cases were "extremely difficult".

Two men were arrested on 20 February 2020.

=== Funeral ===
A funeral was held on Thursday 13 February 2020 at Holy Family Church, Ballsgrove, Drogheda, attended by several hundred people; his torso had still not been recovered at this time. Father Phil Gaffney conducted the funeral service and condemned the killing as well as the feud during the homily. He described the deceased as "young and naive enough to fall in with the wrong people, not knowing or anticipating the dire consequences". He also said "I hope that his death will be a warning to other young teenagers who are being groomed by the ruthless criminals; that the promise of money and gifts will inevitably end in tragedy". He also criticised people who took illegal recreational drugs as fuelling the violence of the feud. Mulready-Woods was buried in Calvary Cemetery, Drogheda.

Gardaí had requested that media did not enter the church during the funeral service, though they instead gathered outside. When the funeral cortege arrived, a young man broke off from the crowd outside the church and approached the media, telling them to leave. He said if they were still outside the church after the funeral was over he would break their cameras. After the funeral, two men ran over to the media calling them "scum" but they were stopped by Gardaí.

=== Charges ===
On 28 February 2020 a 50-year-old man was charged with impeding the apprehension or prosecution of another person in relation to the death of Keane Mulready-Woods.

=== Belfast shooting ===
On 4 April 2020, Robbie Lawlor was shot dead aged 36 around 11:50am outside a house in Etna Drive, Ardoyne in north Belfast. He had travelled to Belfast the morning he was shot and the PSNI and Garda Síochána believe he had travelled to Belfast in the hours before he was shot, possibly to collect debts. As well as being a suspect in the death of Keane Mulready-Woods he was suspected of being responsible for a number of other killings. He had been threatened by one faction in the Drogheda feud but was also at odds with Mr. Big. Three men suspected of the murder were arrested and questioned by the PSNI at Musgrave police station.

Three suspects were arrested on Saturday, a fourth was arrested on Sunday.

The shooting was condemned by Detective Sergeant Jason Murphy, as a murder, as a danger to the local community and due to the additional pressures caused by the coronavirus pandemic. The shooting was also condemned by Minister for Justice Naomi Long and Sinn Féin MLA Gerry Kelly.

The PSNI suspect that a single gunman shot Lawlor.

=== Charges in relation to Mulready-Woods death ===
In October 2020, Gerard McKenna, a 50-year-old man from Drogheda was charged with impeding the prosecution or apprehension of another person in relation to the death of Keane Mulready-Woods. The trial is scheduled to begin on 17 January 2022, due to a backlog caused by the COVID-19 pandemic.

On 8 December 2020 a man was arrested in connection with the death of Keane Mulready-Woods. Two more men, both in their early 20s, were arrested in relation to his death on 10 December and detained in Dundalk and Mountjoy Garda stations. The man arrested two days before continued to be held in Drogheda Garda station.

=== Further arrests ===
On 17 February 2021 a 29-year-old woman who was associated with Paul Crosby was arrested by Gardaí investigating the murder and dismemberment of a 17-year-old on 12 January 2020 in Drogheda. She is suspected of playing a central role in the logistics of the murder, including cleaning up the crime scene. A 23-year-old man described as "a very minor player" was also arrested and suspected of helping clean up the crime scene. The murder is suspected to have been carried out by the "anti-Maguire" gang in Drogheda.

The 29-year-old woman was with Paul Crosby on 13 January 2020 when a gunman tried to target Crosby but shot the driver of their taxi, leaving Crosby uninjured.

On 19 February 2021, Paul Crosby was arrested in Mountjoy Prison and taken to nearby Mountjoy Garda station by Gardaí investigating the same murder. He was brought from prison to the station under a section 42 warrant, which means he can be detained for 24 hours.

On 2 May 2021 three men were arrested as part of the investigation. A man in his late 20s was arrested on 8 May 2021 and being details under section 42 of the Criminal Justice Act 1999.

On 17 May 2021 Paul Crosby appeared before Drogheda District Court sitting in Dundalk Court charged with the murder of Keane Mulready-Woods. In December 2022 he was convicted of facilitating Mulready-Woods' murder.

=== Men sent forward to Special Criminal Court ===
On 24 May 2021 two men charged with the murder of Keane Mulready-Woods were sent forward to face trial in the Special Criminal Court.

=== Man jailed for cleaning and removing evidence ===
Gerard McKenna of Rathmullen Park was jailed in March 2022 for four years for cleaning and removing evidence from his home. McKenna had met a number of men in a cafe in West Street on 12 January 2020. The men ordered him to stay away from his house, so he stayed with a friend for the night. He was told to clean the house when he returned, despite it already having been cleaned. He bought some paint and three pallets of flooring from a friends house to replace the floor.

Forensics teams found evidence of blood of the deceased in several places in McKenna's house, blood spatter in part of a couch in the back garden and on the other part of the couch that had been taken 70m to a green area to be burned. A ballistic vest belonging to the deceased was found at the latter site - McKenna denied any knowledge of the vest. A car parked in a nearby lane also had evidence, including an axe with blood stains and a bone fragment. The keys to the car were left in McKenna's home.

A detective said that a certain criminal, now deceased, had ordered McKenna to stay away from the house.

=== Man pleads guilty to facilitating murder ===
In December 2022 Paul Crosby, pleaded guilty to facilitating the murder and dismemberment of Keane Mulready-Woods. He was remanded in custody for sentencing in January 2023.

=== Two men jailed for disposal of Keane Mulready-Woods' remains ===
Stephen Carberry from Dublin, admitted to collecting two bags with the remains of Mulready-Woods from the house in Drogheda where he was killed and dumping one in Dublin. Carberry, who was on bail at the time, was sentenced to six years consecutive to a sentence for drug dealing.

Glen Bride from Dublin drove a car with the head and feet of Mulready-Woods in the boot before setting it on fire in Dublin’s north inner city. He was also sentenced to six years in prison.

== See also ==
- List of solved missing person cases (2020s)
