= MV W.B. Yeats =

Ship built in 2018

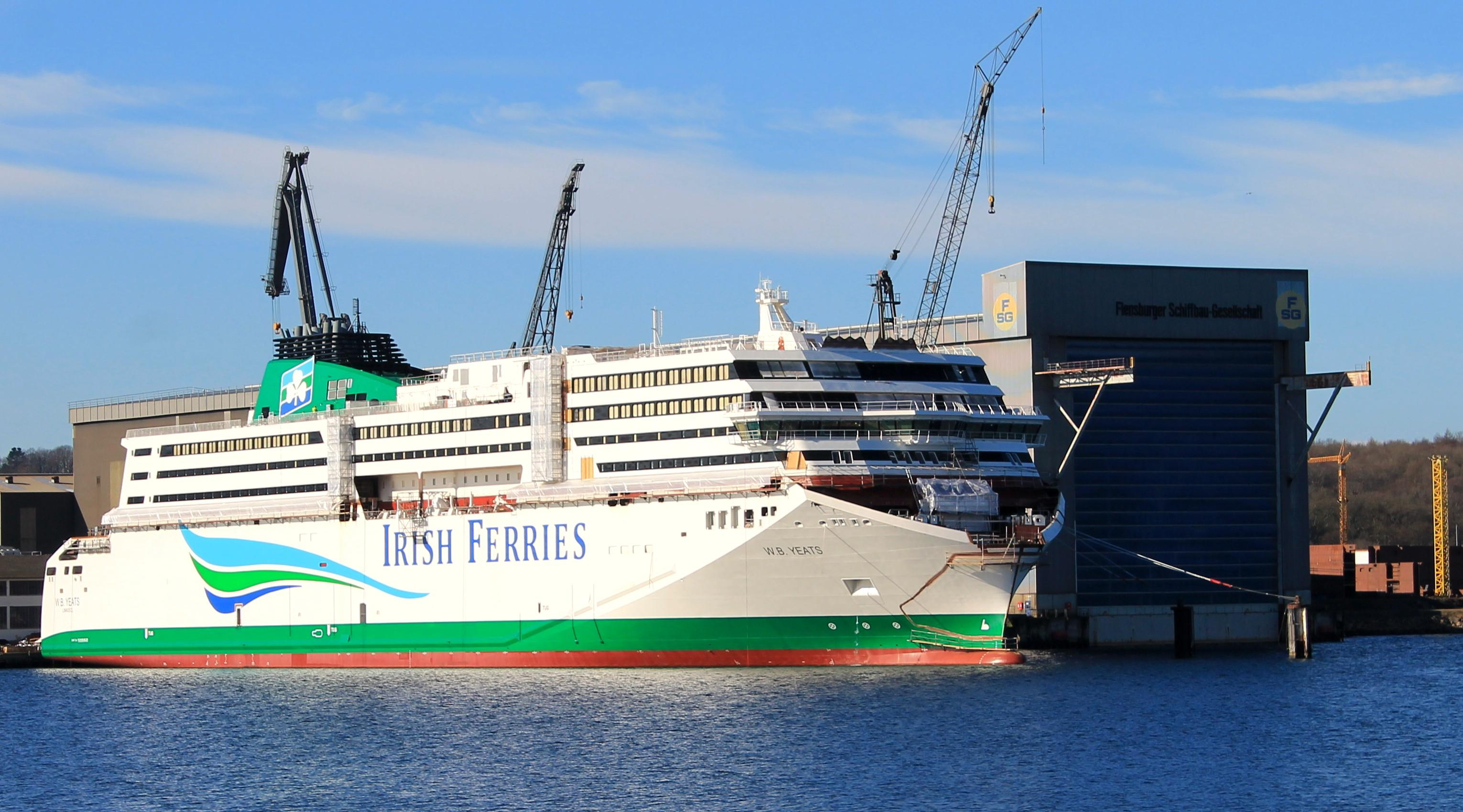
- W.B. Yeats during fitting out

History
- Name: MV W.B. Yeats
- Namesake: W. B. Yeats
- Owner: Irish Continental Group
- Operator: Irish Ferries
- Port of registry: Limassol, Cyprus
- Route: Dublin–Cherbourg
- Builder: Flensburger Schiffbau-Gesellschaft
- Yard number: 771
- Laid down: 11 September 2017
- Launched: 19 January 2018
- In service: 22 January 2019
- Identification: IMO number: 9809679; MMSI number: 209146000; Callsign: 5BXC4

General characteristics
- Tonnage: 51,388 GT; 7,859 DWT
- Length: 194.8 m (639 ft)
- Beam: 31.6 m (104 ft)
- Draught: 6.7 m (22 ft)
- Installed power: 4 × Caterpillar 8M43C (4 × 8,400 kW)
- Speed: 22.5 knots (41.7 km/h; 25.9 mph)
- Capacity: 1,800 passengers; 1,216 cars (maximum)
- Crew: 85

MV W.B. Yeats is a roll-on/roll-off passenger and freight vessel in the fleet of Irish Ferries. She arrived in Dublin for the first time on 20 December 2018 and entered service in January 2019.

== History ==
The ship, at the time unnamed, was ordered from German shipbuilder Flensburger Schiffbau-Gesellschaft in May 2016 at a cost of €144 million. At the time of the order, the vessel was planned to enter service in May 2018. Her keel was laid in September 2017, by which time the expected delivery had slipped to July 2018. In October, her name was announced to be W.B. Yeats, chosen in an online competition.

W.B. Yeats' hull was launched on 19 January 2018, but delays during the fitting out process led to Irish Ferries delaying her entry into service first to late July, then to September.

The deck structure was built in Poland and assembled on the hull by floating cranes Matador III and Taklift 4 after the launch.

In August, The Irish Times reported that her delivery would likely not take place until October, but work was further delayed and she did not begin sea trials until late in the month. Irish Ferries eventually took delivery of the ship on 12 December 2018. She arrived in Ireland on 20 December 2018. W.B. Yeats made her much delayed first commercial sailing on 22 January 2019 when she struck the berth attempting to dock at Holyhead leaving a dent in the ship and bending the ramp in the impact delaying the offloading by some time and forcing Irish Ferries to put the booked passengers on the Stena sailing to Dublin, just over a year after her hull was launched.

== Design ==
W.B. Yeats measures 54,985 gross tons, with a length of 194.8 metres (639 ft) and a beam of 31.6 metres (104 ft). She has a total capacity of 1,885 passengers and crew, with 435 individual passenger cabins. Her vehicle deck has an area of about 3,500 lane meters, giving her a maximum capacity of 1,216 cars or 165 trucks. She is powered by four Caterpillar 8M43(C) Diesel engines with a total power output of 33,600 kilowatts (45,100 hp) that can propel her at up to 22.5 knots (25.9 mph). Passenger facilities are spread out over four decks, with decks 8 and 9 containing nothing but cabins and the public facilities housed on decks 10 and 11.
