= Cornelius Price =

Irish criminal (died 2023)

Cornelius Price (c. 1980-2023) was an Irish organised crime gang leader. While he lived in Ireland, he lived in Gormanston, County Meath.

== Family ==
He was a father of two children.

== Criminal history ==
He was convicted of reckless endangerment by driving a van at a Garda at Balbriggan Garda station – the Garda had to jump out of the way. Price was sentenced to three years imprisonment for this and was released in May 2019.

He was a chief suspect in the death of Benny Whitehouse and also in the disappearances of William Maughan and Anna Varslavane. He was believed to have lured the couple to his residence in Gormanstown, where they were murdered. He is also believed to have ordered a pipe bomb attack on the sister of William Maughan shortly after the latter went missing.

=== Drogheda feud ===
Gardaí believe that he was the leader of one of the gangs in the Drogheda feud. His gang is known as the Price-Maguire organised group, which has close ties with several other gangs, including the McCarthy-Dundon gang from Limerick. The feud led to four deaths. The first was that of Keith Brannigan at Aisling Holiday park in Clogherhead, County Louth. Robbie Lawlor, a rival of Price, ordered the murder of Keane Mulready-Woods. Lawlor was himself shot dead three months later, with suspicions that associates of Price, as well as criminals from Limerick, being responsible. A video of Price toasting the death of Lawlor circulated on social media.

=== United Kingdom ===
Price left Ireland for the Midlands of the United Kingdom after the death of Mulready-Woods. He was involved with the kidnapping and drugging of two brothers, who were forced to call their relatives for a £300,000 ransom. They were rescued by armed police. Darren McClean was convicted in relation to the offence. Price was also charged in relation to the kidnapping, but was deemed too ill to go to court. He was admitted to hospital with limbic encephalitis in Wales in 2021.

== Death ==
He died in hospital on 19 February 2023. He was 41 years old.

== Funeral ==
Gardaí were planning a large policing operation around his funeral. There were concerns that some of his enemies may attend the funeral.
