= MS Isle of Inishmore (1996) =

Ship built in 1996

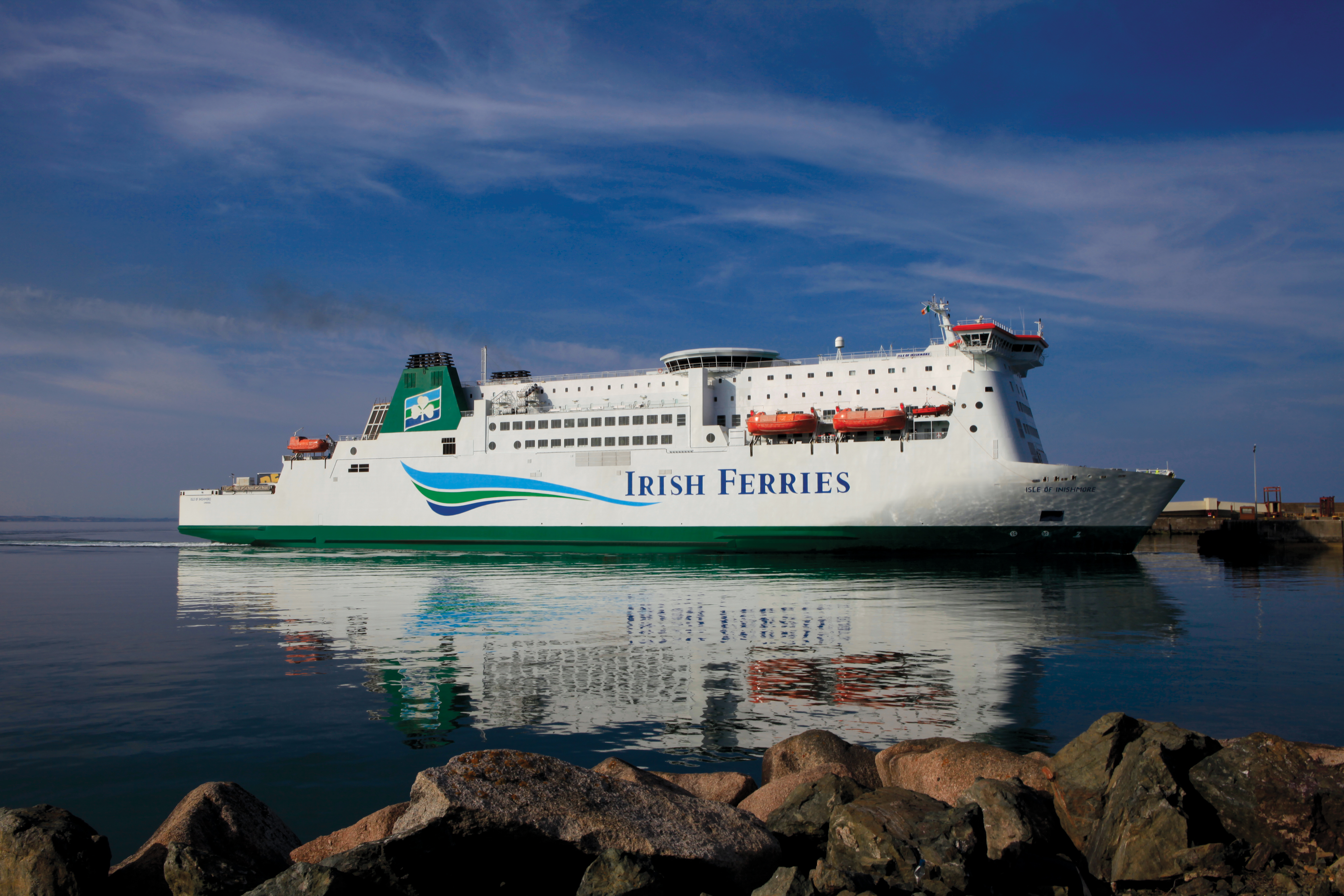
- MS Isle of Inishmore heading towards Rosslare.

History
- Name: Isle of Inishmore
- Operator: Irish Ferries
- Port of registry: 1997-2006: Dublin, Ireland; 2006 onwards: Limassol, Cyprus
- Route: 1997-2001 Holyhead-Dublin; 2001-2021 Rosslare-Pembroke Dock; 2021-today Dover - Calais
- Builder: Van der Giessen de Noord
- Cost: IR£60 million
- Yard number: 968
- Laid down: December 1995
- Launched: 4 October 1996
- Completed: February 1997
- In service: March 1997
- Identification: IMO number: 9142605
- Status: In service

General characteristics
- Tonnage: 34,031 GT 5,860 DWT
- Length: 182.5 m (598 ft 9 in)
- Beam: 27.8 m (91 ft 2 in)
- Draught: 5.8 m (19 ft 0 in)
- Decks: 11
- Deck clearance: 4.9 m (16 ft 1 in) (decks 3 and 5 w/o mezzanine deck); 2.1 m (6 ft 11 in) (mezzanine deck 6 and deck 5 when in use)
- Ramps: Internal 3.23 m (10 ft 7 in) wide ramp for single-level loading
- Ice class: 1A
- Installed power: 4x Sulzer 8ZA40S diesel engines, 6,000 kW each (total 24,000kW) + 2 LIPS 2,400kW bow thrusters
- Propulsion: 2x LIPS 4.8m four-blade variable pitch propellers
- Speed: 21.5 knots
- Capacity: 2,200 passengers; 186 berths; 856 cars; 122 16.2 metre units/lorries; 2,890 lane metres (2,060 main + 830 mezzanine)
- Crew: up to 140
- Notes: Shares hull form with Stena Jutlandica

MS Isle of Inishmore is a ro-ro ferry owned by Irish Ferries and operated on their Dover-Calais service. At the time of her introduction, she was the largest car ferry operating in Northern Europe. She is named after Inishmore, the largest of the Aran Islands. The name of the ferry is tautologous, since "Inishmore" derives from the Irish for "big island". Despite not being sister ships, the ship's design is copied from the Stena Line vessel Stena Jutlandica up until the superstructure.

== Design and construction ==
Isle of Inishmore was constructed by Van der Giessen de Noord in Rotterdam, the Netherlands, at a cost of IR£60 million. Construction commenced in December 1995, and the vessel was launched in October 1996. She was delivered to Dublin in February 1997, before entering service in March 1997.

Power is provided by four Sulzer diesel engines. Each round trip between Rosslare and Pembroke requires 25 tonnes of marine diesel oil.

== Career ==
Isle of Inishmore began her career on Irish Ferries' Dublin-Holyhead route as the flagship of the company's fleet, replacing the 1995 built Isle of Innisfree. Following the introduction of the larger MS Ulysses onto the route in March 2001, Isle of Inishmore was redeployed to the Rosslare-Pembroke route. She was replaced on the Pembroke Dock to Rosslare crossing by the Blue Star 1. The chartering of the Blue Star 1 freed up Isle of Inishmore from the Pembroke-Rosslare crossing, and, still under the Irish Ferries brand, will be redeployed on the Dover-Calais crossing. After finishing works in Denmark, involving replacing the stern ramp with sliding doors and installing a so-called "cow catcher" at the bow to fit at both Dover and Calais, the Inishmore arrived in Dover on 19 June 2021, and conducted berthing trials at both Dover and Calais. The vessel then entered service on 29 June.

== Incidents ==
In 2006, the vessel broke its moorings and ran aground, with minor damage.

On 30 July 2008 a fire broke out on board the Isle of Inishmore at Pembroke Dock at approximately 02.30am, in a thermal oil boiler located adjacent to the engine room of the vessel. The function of this boiler is to preheat the fuel oil prior to its use in the ship's main engines. The ship was getting ready to sail for Rosslare at 02:45am, with some 227 passengers and 89 crew on board. All passengers and crew were put on standby. At 4:20am the fire was brought under control with nobody having been injured. The 02:45am Pembroke to Rosslare and the 08:45am Rosslare to Pembroke crossings were both cancelled as a result.
