= Port of Bloscon-Roscoff =

Coordinates: 48.721°N 3.965°W

Roscoff is a town situated on the north coast of Finistère, Brittany. Its favorable position at the western end of the channel along with the efforts of the economic administrators have allowed the port to survive and develop itself within the different fields surrounding the sea. Amongst the 13 main Breton ports, Roscoff is one of the largest commercial harbours on the list.

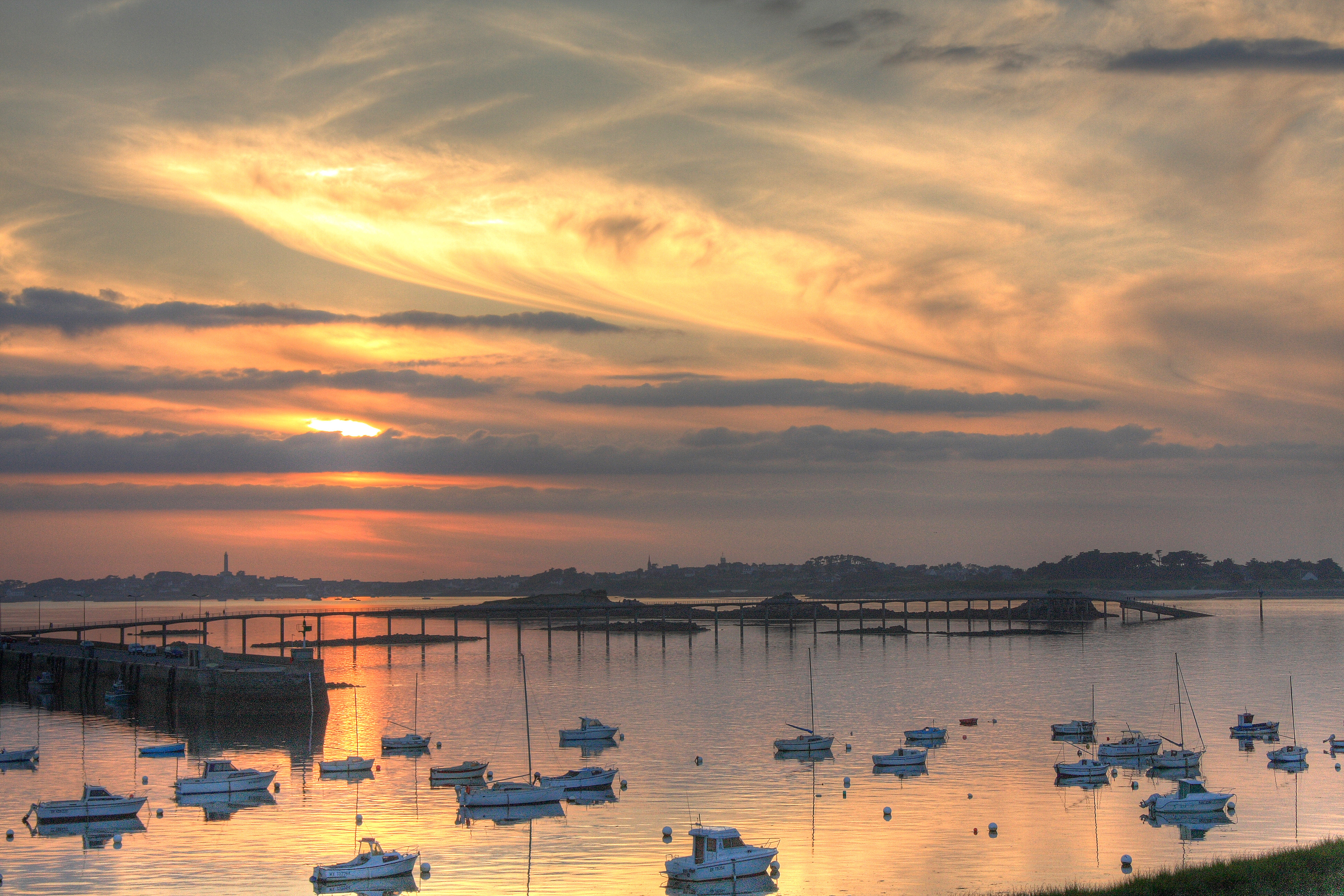
port of Bloscon-Roscoff

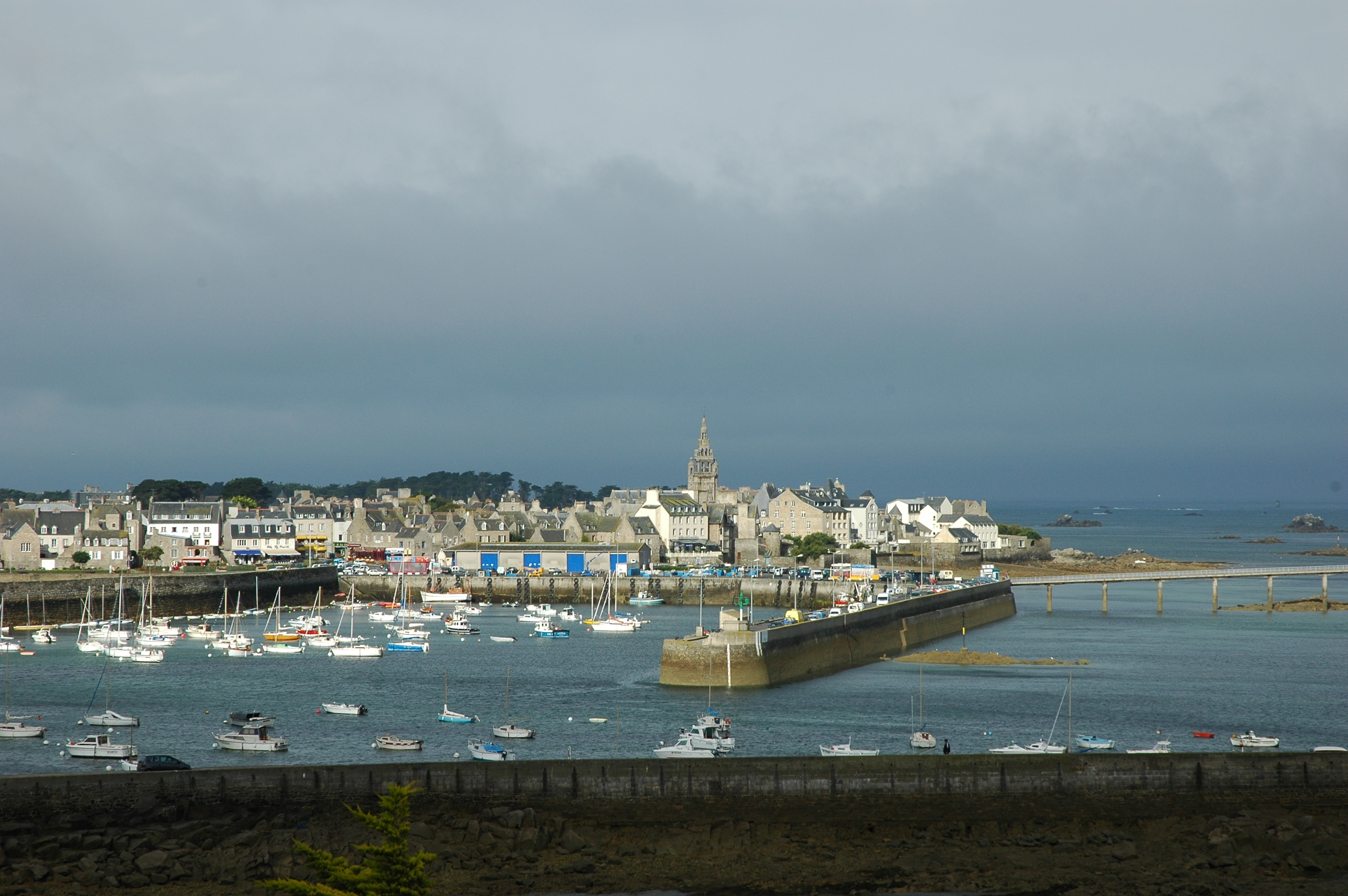
port of Bloscon-Roscoff

== History ==
Roscoff has played an important role in the history of Brittany and France with a rich and diverse past. Whether it be in the defence of the region, the transport of local produce or fishing, the port seems to have always been involved.

Indeed, at the time when France and England were sworn enemies, Roscoff was host to bloody battles. It seems as though the area was at the time a strategic stretch of land to pass through, being a stone's throw from England and the heart of local trading. The area along with the rest of Brittany coasts witnessed bloody naval battles such as in 1404, when a fleet of 30 ships fought against the English in the bay of Laber under the command of Jean du Penhoat. The outcome of these fierce battles varied, with both sides having succumbed to great losses.

However, later on, the outlook towards the neighbouring countries changed dramatically. Eased tensions allowed business to take place more permissively. In fact, by 1828, Henri Ollivier, alias the “first Johnny”, made the crossing of the channel to sell onions for the first time. Today, their number is nowhere near as high as it once was. Nevertheless, the amount of “johnnies” has been recovering slightly in recent years thanks to a renewed interest. Some of the other products being conveyed were cauliflowers, potatoes and artichokes for cabotage, eggs, salted butter and some crustaceans.

By the end of the 19th century, there was a high demand for a pier to be constructed, the first mention of this dating back to 1882. Indeed, a major issue with the port at the time was the considerable range between high and low water. This would lead to a complete drying of the port. Finally, construction began in August 2012. For a number of reasons, the building of the jetty was only completely achieved by 1934-35 and sadly, too late. Roscoff missed out on the intense shipping traffic era and saw instead a period where exportation was at a low point.

On the other hand, fishing also represented a large chunk of the economy of the region. A diverse kind of fish and crustaceans were caught in local seas and either sold in the area or exported. Later on, another technique was thought of by Monsieur Chevalier. Once permission was granted in 1863, the captain established a pool with a maximum capacity of 80000 crustaceans in a small bay alongside the chapel of Saint Barbe.

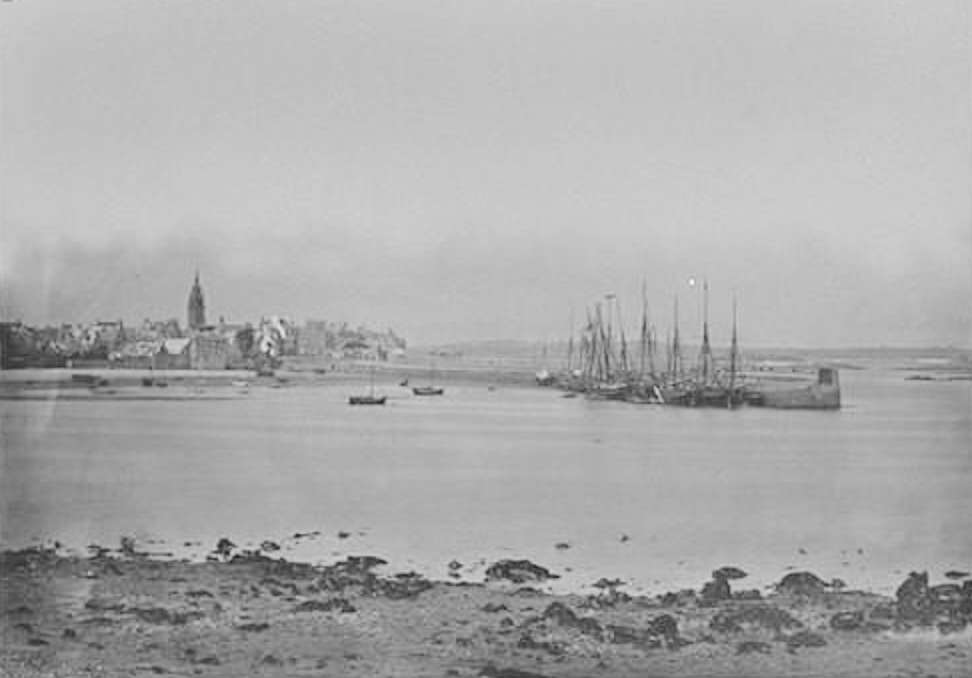
Port in 1873

== Passenger terminal ==
The construction of a deep water port went on from 1970 until 1972, on the initiative of business and political leaders from the region of Morlaix, the management being dealt with by the Chamber of Commerce and Industry of Morlaix. As a result, A ferry dock long by 240 meters specifically reserved for ferries and equipped with a dual lane ramp 70 meters in length appeared on the scene.

Yet, another issue stood in the way of their project: no company was willing to take the risk of making the port of Bloscon one of their proposed destinations, on the grounds that there was no market in the west. For this reason, Alexis Gourvennec, founder of the SICA (Society of Agricultural Collective Interest) of Saint-Pol-de-Léon, along with the vegetable producers whom were part of this at the time, came up with the creation of the BAI society (Brittany, England, Ireland, better known under its commercial name: Brittany Ferries). Naturally, at first, its original purpose was oriented towards the export of vegetables.

Today, just one maritime firms come to dock in Roscoff:

- Brittany Ferries, with 2 destinations: Plymouth and Cork

- Irish Ferries, sailed to-and-fro between Rosslare and Roscoff from 1995 until 2018. They now use Cherbourg as their French destination instead.

As of 2011, the total of cross channel-traffic shared out between Roscoff and Saint-Malo was 960586 passengers.

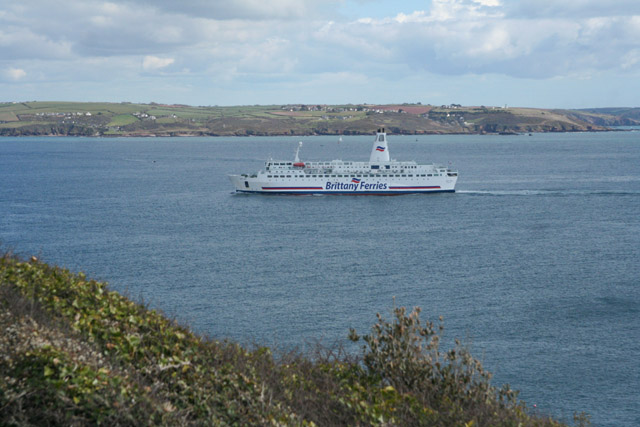
ferry outward bound

== Fishing ==
In 2001, a new field was furthermore improved with the arrival of 2 quays providing a linear docking of 190 meters, as well as a modern auction. These constructions now offer the best conditions to the professionals within the field for a better profitability.

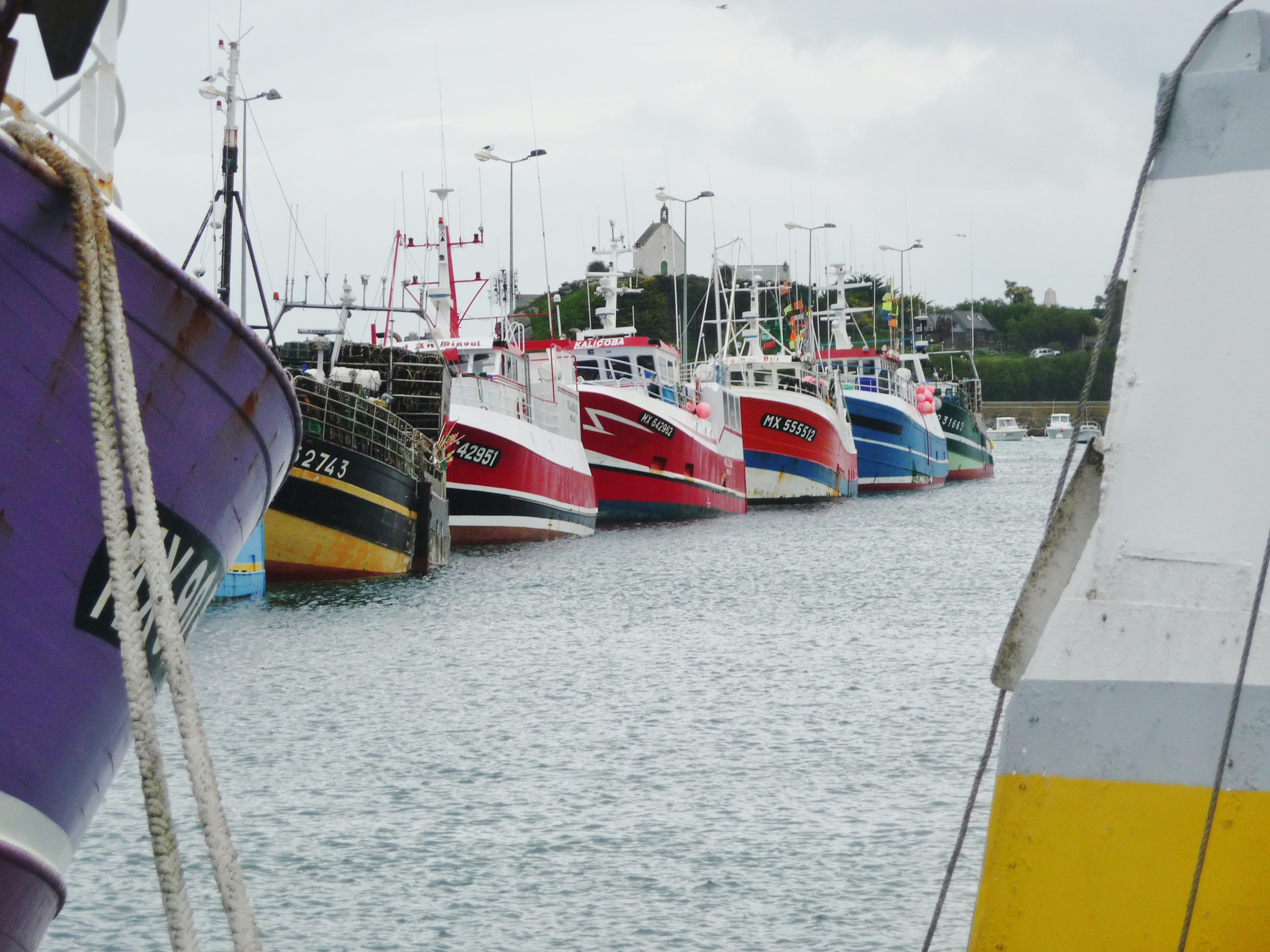
fleet of fishing vessels

== Île de Batz crossing ==
A regular crossing by launch throughout the complete year has been in place since the jetty was concluded in 1969. Vedette- Armor ensures this task nowadays. The trip will take you around 15 minutes.

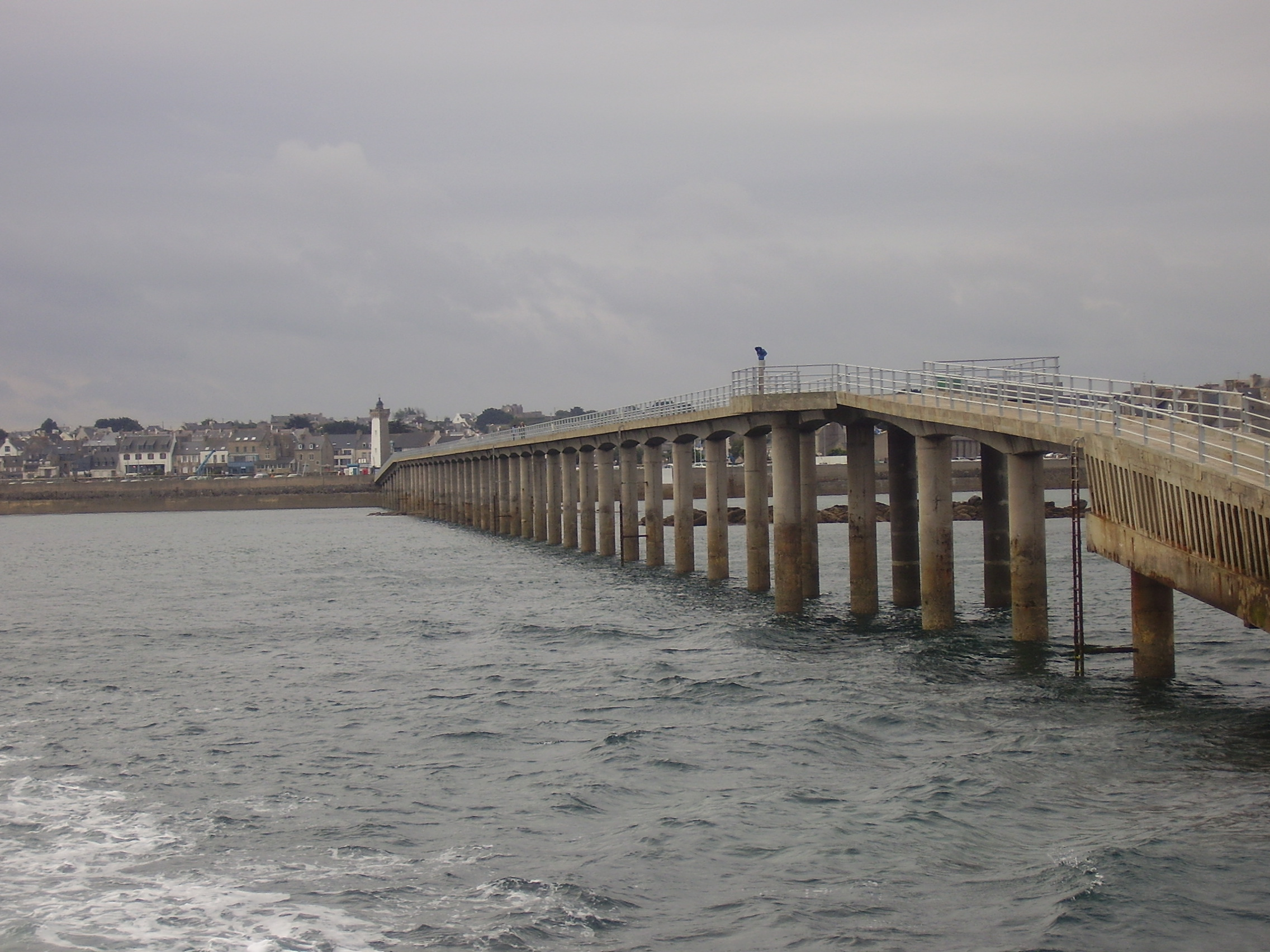
île de batz

== Freight shipping ==
Cargo exportation isn't the main activity in the area. Nevertheless, a couple of quays were put in place, respectively of 120m and 90m in length. The largest one being able to support freighters of up to 5000 tonnes. Facilities within the harbour provide adequate storage for the discharged cargo. Hence, Roscoff can meet the needs of companies in the hinterland.

== Marina ==
The project of a marina came about in the early 2000s. Finally the plan was approved and its undertaking commenced in 2009–2010, for an expected duration of 4 years. Despite the fact that it was incomplete, the dock was opened to the public on June 15, 2012. An angled pier ensures its protection from the swell. 625 berths are available along the pontoons, 50 of these for visitors.

== Events ==
The port of Bloscon hosted the start of the Tourduf race in 2012.
