= Disappearances of William Maughan and Anna Varslavane =

2015 missing person case in Ireland

William Maughan
- Born: 1981; Tallaght, Ireland
- Died: April 14, 2015 (aged 34); County Meath, Ireland
- Known for: Disappearance and likely murder
- Partner: Anna Varslavane

Anna Varslavane
- Born: 1994; Latvia
- Died: April 14, 2015 (aged 21); County Meath, Ireland
- Known for: Disappearance and likely murder
- Partner: William Maughan

William Maughan and Anna Varslavane are a couple who disappeared on 14 April 2015 from the Gormanstown area of County Meath in Ireland.

== Background ==
William "Willie" Maughan was originally from Tallaght. He was 5 feet 8 inches (173 centimetres) tall, with a shaven head and green eyes. He was 34.

Anastasija "Anna" Varslavane was originally from Latvia but had lived in Ireland for several years. She was 5 feet 6 inches (168 centimetres) tall, of slim build and had dark hair. She was 21. She was pregnant at the time of her disappearance.

== Disappearance ==
They had been living together in Gormanston, County Meath, and were on their way to meet William's mother to get a lift to Tallaght.

On 14 April 2015 Anna rang William's mother at 2:57pm. One of her sons answered and he could hear Anna calling for help.

Ten minutes later the Maughan family arrived at the agreed pickup point but neither William or Anna were there.

== Investigation ==
Gardaí (police) suspect the couple were murdered on orders from a figure who has since become involved in the Drogheda feud. They suspect that he was behind the fatal shooting of Benny Whitehouse in Balbriggan in 2014 and that the couple were killed because the gang feared that they would provide information to the Gardaí about the shooting of Whitehouse.

William's parents Joseph and Helen have made appeals about the disappearance of their son and his girlfriend. Joseph Maughan believes that his son was targeted because he knew too much about a murder that happened in 2014.

In August 2016 the grave of William's younger brother Michael "Bobby" Maughan was dug up in what the family believe was an attempt at intimidation by the gang responsible for the disappearance. The vandalism happened in the early hours of the morning the day after Joseph Maughan appealed for information on the disappearance of William. Three men entered Bohernabreena Cemetery after 2 am and started digging up the grave, though Michael's remains were not removed from it. Michael Maughan died as a result of meningitis.

In 2017, Gardaí examined a site in County Louth as one line of investigation.

On 28 April 2020, a man in his 50s was arrested and held at Ashbourne Garda station. He could be questioned for up to seven days. It was the first arrest in the investigation.

On 8 July 2020, three men in their twenties, fifties, and sixties and a woman in her forties were arrested and held in Garda stations in Meath and Dublin in relation to the case. Searches that took place at a location in Meath were completed on the same date. On 10 July 2020, they were released. Gardaí intended to prepare files for the Director of Public Prosecutions, who would decide on whether to prosecute.

Gardaí believe gangland figure Cornelius Price may have ordered the deaths of William, Anna, and their unborn child. Price died in Wales in 2023.

== See also ==
- List of people who disappeared mysteriously (2000–present)
