= Robbie Lawlor =

Irish criminal (1985–2020)

- An undated image of Lawlor from his social media
- Born: Robert Lawlor; 1985; Dublin, Ireland
- Died: 4 April 2020 (aged 35); Etna Drive, Ardoyne, north Belfast
- Cause of death: Shot dead
- Children: 3

Robert Lawlor (1985 – 4 April 2020) was an Irish criminal. He was originally from Dublin, but had lived in County Meath and was heavily involved in organised crime, including the Drogheda feud. Well known to Gardaí, Lawlor was a suspect in at least five murders, including the mutilation and killing of Keane Mulready-Woods, and had over 100 convictions at the time of his death.

== Early and personal life ==
Born in 1985, Lawlor was from Foxhill in Coolock. He was a father of three children. He described himself as an "unemployed fitness trainer". In his later life, Lawlor was addicted to cocaine and steroids.

== Criminal career ==
Lawlor was involved in crime from the age of eighteen, originally a low-level joyrider. In 2005, he was sentenced to jail for seven years after pleading guilty to possession of cocaine and handling a stolen vehicle. Also in 2005, Lawlor is believed to have been the man behind the murder of Mark Byrne, shot dead while on day release from Mountjoy Prison.

Lawlor worked as a gunman for hire, killing for cash. He was suspected of murdering David "Fred" Lynch, a former associate of his whose body was found on waste ground near Belcamp in Dublin in 2009. Lawlor was believed to have carried out hits for Lynch's gang, but was said to have killed Lynch in a double cross. Lawlor and associate Noel Deans had organised to meet Lynch to retrieve a buried gun, but Lawlor shot him with it. A year later, Deans began openly bragging about being with Lawlor at the time of Lynch's murder, while drinking with Lawlor's associate Ken Finn in the Priorswood Inn pub. After making a phone call to Lawlor, Finn walked Deans into a pedestrian alleyway where Lawlor shot Deans dead. Lawlor was also believed to have shot Anthony Ayodeji in Darndale in 2008. He was never convicted of any of these crimes due to lack of evidence.

In 2013, Lawlor robbed a cash box from a McDonald's restaurant in Donaghmede, putting a gun to the head of a security guard in the process. After being spotted by Gardaí attempting to hide stolen cash covered in blue dye from the till, Lawlor was charged with robbery. He later pleaded guilty to a lesser charge of possession of stolen money, being sentenced to 32 months in prison. In 2015, Lawlor was sentenced to 16 months in prison after Gardaí spotted him driving a stolen car; he had already been disqualified from driving. While in prison on these charges, he unsuccessfully attempted to escape prison in 2016, having attempted to attack security guards while in the Mater Hospital.

In 2018, Lawlor's former associate Ken Finn was shot dead; Lawlor was again the prime suspect for this. Finn was believed to have been murdered as he was the right-hand man of a Coolock criminal boss, unidentifiable for legal reasons but dubbed "Mr. Big" by media sources, who Lawlor was involved in a dispute with.

In 2019, Lawlor went on trial, accused of threatening to murder his ex-girlfriend Rachel Kirwan, her partner Derek Mitchell and his mother Fiona, as well as attempting to murder Fiona, murdering her pet dog and firearm possession with intent to endanger life. Shots had been fired at Mitchell's home, resulting in her pet dog dying. After it emerged that Kirwan had made false statements about Lawlor during proceedings, Lawlor was found not guilty and released from custody. He moved to Laytown in County Meath after his release, as the crime boss known as "Mr. Big" had made it clear he would not be welcome in north Dublin.

At the time of his murder in 2020, Lawlor had 125 convictions, 71 of which were for road traffic offenses.

== Drogheda feud ==
Lawlor became involved in the Drogheda feud through his brother-in-law, Richie Carberry, a criminal who was married to Lawlor's sister Eileen. Lawlor was stabbed in jail in 2018; it was suggested by prison officials that this was done on the orders of Traveller crime boss Cornelius Price.

On 5 July 2018, Owen Maguire was shot six times by a gunman at his home in Drogheda. Maguire, who was left paralysed by the shooting, was an associate of Cornelius Price and a leader of one of the factions in the feud. Lawlor was arrested after being caught speeding towards the North, covered in petrol and stripped of most of his clothes, but was released without charge. In November 2022, Lawlor was named in court documents submitted by the Criminal Assets Bureau as the gunman who had shot Owen Maguire.

On 4 November 2019, Richie Carberry was shot dead at his home. Gardaí believed a young associate of David "Fred" Lynch, the man Lawlor murdered in 2009, may have been the shooter, though Lawlor reportedly suspected Keane Mulready-Woods, the 17 year old son of Price/Maguire gang member Barry Woods, was involved in Carberry's murder.

Shortly after being found not guilty of attempted murder and being released from custody, Lawlor was mugged by teenagers after leaving a gym in December 2019, which was filmed by his assailants, including a young associate of David "Fred" Lynch and suspected to include Keane Mulready-Woods. During this daylight assault on Lawlor, the assailants stole his gym bag and flip-flops and posted photos of them wearing the latter after the mugging. The assault was allegedly at the behest of a criminal foe of Lawlor.

On 12 January 2020, Keane Mulready-Woods went missing, having been last seen at 6pm at St Dominic's Bridge in Drogheda. The next day, a sports bag containing human hands was found in Coolock. The discovery of a human head and hands beside a burning car in Drumcondra followed, with DNA tests confirming both were the severed body of Mulready-Woods. It was believed he was lured to his death, and his head and hands were severed from his body. A pair of flip-flops were found in the bag with Mulready-Woods's remains dumped in Coolock, interpreted as a threat not to cross Lawlor. His torso was found two months later in an overgrown ravine area in Drogheda. It was believed that Lawlor had planned to dump parts of Mulready-Woods's body at Cornelius Price's compound in Gormanston.

== Death ==
On 4 April 2020, Lawlor was shot at around 11:50am outside a house in Etna Drive, Ardoyne in north Belfast. The PSNI and Garda Síochána believe he had travelled to Belfast in the hours before he was shot, possibly to collect debts. He had been threatened by one faction in the Drogheda feud but was also at odds with a major Dublin criminal who is suspected of several murders including that of Alan Ryan. Three men suspected of the murder were arrested and questioned by the PSNI at Musgrave police station. Three suspects were arrested on April 4, a fourth was arrested on April 5. The PSNI suspect that a single gunman shot Lawlor.

Following his death, footage emerged of rival gangs dancing and cheering in celebration of his death. Lawlor was buried next to Richie Carberry in Dardistown Cemetery.

== Investigation ==
In December 2020 two men, one from Derry and one from Belfast, were charged with his murder. Both were also charged with possession of a 9mm pistol with intent to endanger life. They appeared via videolink and spoke only to confirm that they understood the charges. They were remanded in custody, to appear before the court by videolink again on 8 January 2021.

On 2 April 2026, a 47-year old man was arrested in Dublin in a joint operation between Gardaí and PSNI. He is wanted by the PSNI on charges of murder and possession of a firearm. Another man, Barry Young, appeared in court on 22 June 2026 over an extradition warrant to Northern Ireland in connection to Lawlor's murder.
