= Paul Crosby (criminal) =

Irish criminal

Paul Crosby is an Irish criminal who was involved in the Drogheda feud and is serving a 10 year prison sentence for his involvement in the killing of Keane Mulready-Woods in 2020.

== Attempted murder trial ==
In February 2019 he went on trial accused of attempted murder, kidnapping and intentionally or recklessly causing serious harm. He pleaded not guilty on all counts. During the trial the man who he was alleged to have attacked admitted to lying to Gardaí and the jury in a previous trial. The judge said that the real issue was whether Crosby was "present and participated in the injuries" as claimed by Boyle and that the jury would have to evaluate "the contradictions" of the testimony of Boyle. The jury took 43 minutes to find Crosby not guilty on all charges.

== Car arson ==
On 22 April 2020 he was jailed for four and a half years after pleading guilty to the arson of a stolen Volkswagen Polo. The car, with a 132 registration, was stolen by Crosby and two others from the car park of an industrial estate on the Ballymakenny Road, Drogheda. It was then taken to a field at Yellowbatter, outside Drogheda. The thieves drove their original car, a BMW, to a petrol station, where they purchased petrol and put it into a water bottle. One person got out of the BMW to set the other car on fire. The thieves drove from the scene but were quickly stopped by Gardaí, including members of the Garda Emergency Response Unit. Crosby was a passenger in the BMW and had not got the petrol or set fire to the car, but he was part of the common design and joint enterprise. At the time of his arrest he had 40 previous convictions, three of them drug related as well as a cocaine addiction.

== Death of Keane Mulready-Woods ==
On 17 February 2021 a 29 year old woman who was associated with Paul Crosby was arrested by Gardaí investigating the murder and dismemberment of a 17 year old on 12 January 2020 in Drogheda. She is suspected of playing a central role in the logistics of the murder, including cleaning up the crime scene. a 23 year old man described as "a very minor player" was also arrested and suspected of helping clean up the crime scene. The murder is suspected to have been carried out by the "anti-Maguire" gang in Drogheda.

The 29 year old woman was with Paul Crosby on 13 January 2020 when a gunman tried to target Crosby but shot the driver of their taxi, leaving Crosby uninjured.

On February 19, 2021 Paul Crosby was arrested in Mountjoy Prison and taken to nearby Mountjoy Garda station by Gardaí investigating the same murder. He was brought from prison to the station under a section 42 warrant, which means he can be detained for 24 hours.

He was charged with the teenagers murder on 17 May 2021.

In December 2022 Paul Crosby pleaded guilty to facilitating the murder of Keane Mulready-Woods. He was remanded in custody for sentencing in January 2023. Crosby was later sentenced to 10 years in prison for his involvement in the murder.
