= MS Isle of Inisheer =

Ferry

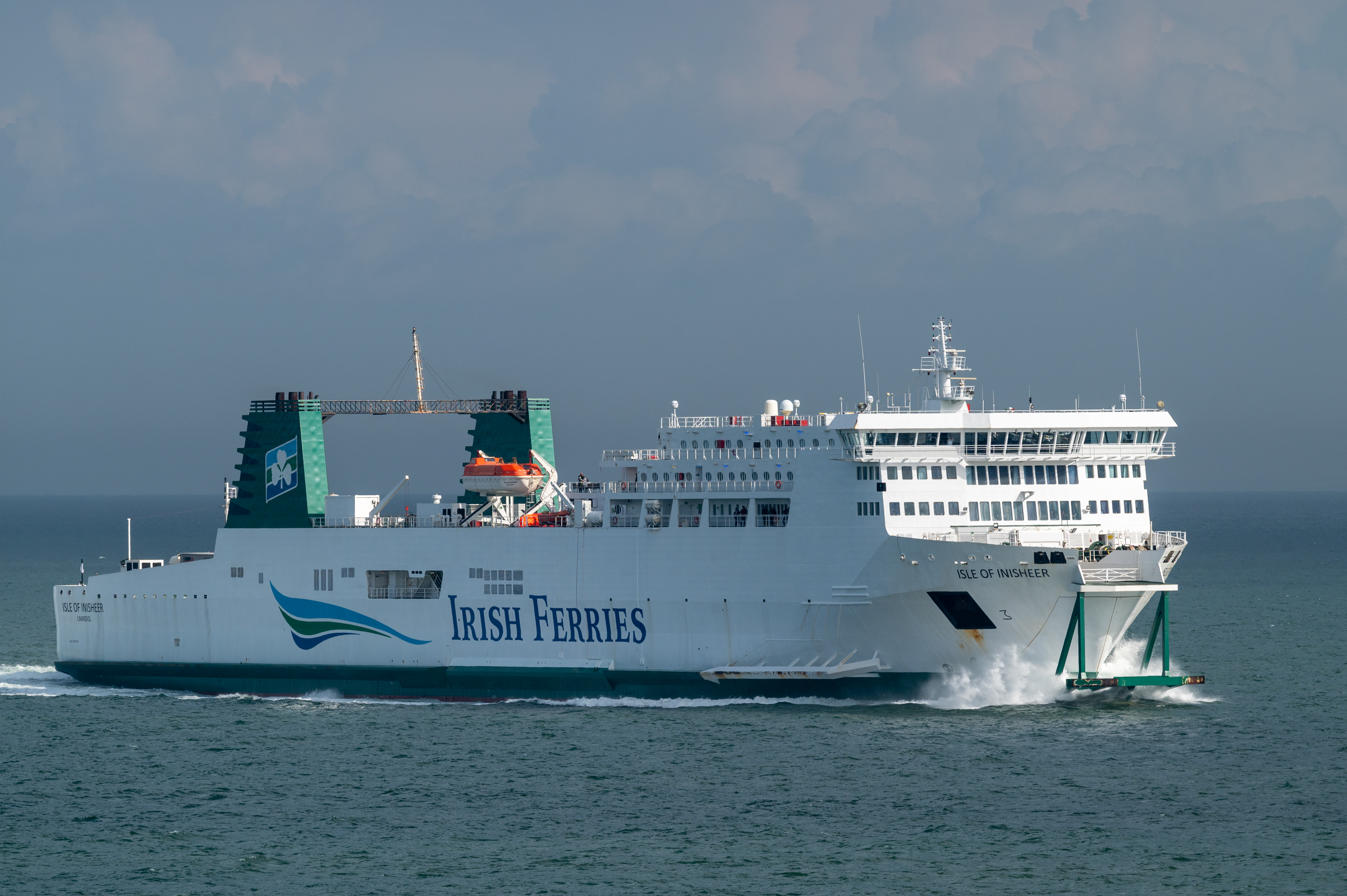
- M/S Isle of Inisheer, operated by Irish Ferries, arriving at Dover, UK.

History
- Name: Isle Of Inisheer (2022-present); Ciudad De Mahon (2019-2022); Zurbaran (2006-2019); Murillo Dos (temporarily in 2006); Northern Merchant (2000-2006)
- Operator: Norfolkline (2000–2006); Acciona Transmediterranea (2006–2022); Irish Ferries (2022-present)
- Port of registry: Dover, United Kingdom, UK (2000-2006); Santa Cruz De Tenerife, Spain (2006-2022); Limassol, Cyprus (2022-present)
- Route: Dover—Dunkerque (2000-2006); Valencia - Las Palmas; Barcelona - Ibiza/Mahón/Palma/Menorca; Palma - Mahón/Ibiza; Dover - Calais (2022 – 2024)
- Builder: Astilleros Españoles S.A. (AESA) Seville, Spain.
- Cost: $65 million USD
- Yard number: 289
- Laid down: 30 September 1998
- Launched: 15 May 1999
- Completed: 26 February 2000
- Acquired: 26 February 2000
- Maiden voyage: 20 March 2000 - (Dover-Dunkerque)
- In service: 20 March 2000
- Identification: Callsign: ECLK, MZXK7 (former); IMO number: 9181091; MMSI number: 224882000
- Status: Unknown ( not saling on dover - calais on there website as it did passengers ( and lorrys )

General characteristics
- Tonnage: 22,152 GT
- Length: 179.95 m (590 ft 5 in)
- Beam: 25.24 m (82 ft 10 in)
- Draught: 6.5 m (21 ft 4 in)
- Installed power: 4 x Wärtsilä 9L38 diesel engines producing 5940 kW each at 600 rpm.; 2 x Wärtsilä 6L20 diesel engines producing 930 kW each at 900 rpm
- Propulsion: 2 x 4.85m Wärtsilä Wichman propellers turning at 138 rpm; 2 x Brunvoll 1300 kW bow thrusters
- Speed: 22.5 knots (41.7 km/h; 25.9 mph)
- Capacity: 589 passengers; 91 freight vehicles; 1,950 lane metres
- Crew: 47

MV Isle of Inisheer is a RoPax ferry owned by Irish Continental Group and operated by Irish Ferries.

== History ==
=== Merchant Ferries ===
The Inisheer was built in 2000 as the Northern Merchant by Astilleros Españoles S.A. in Seville, Spain for Merchant Ferries and was supposed originally to operate in the Irish Sea, likely between Liverpool and Dublin. However, the merger of Merchant Ferries with Norse Irish Ferries forming Norse Merchant Ferries caused the newly formed company to have excess capacity.

=== Norfolkline ===
As a result, the Northern Merchant instead was chartered to Norfolkline for their Dover-Dunkerque service. Through her time with Norfolkline, she gradually gained several modifications, most notably a cow-catcher and sliding bows instead of the typical ramps, and twin-level loading.

She was replaced on the Dover-Dunkerque service in March 2006 after the newbuild Maersk Delft entered service. Following her phase-out, she was dry-docked, repainted and modified back to vanilla configuration, removing the cow-catchers, sliding doors and twin-level loading, and returning the ramps on both the bow and stern.

=== Acciona Trasmediterránea ===
Afterwards, she entered service with Acciona Trasmediterránea in May. She was temporarily renamed Murillo Dos, and shortly afterwards renamed the Zurbaran. The name lasted until 2019, when she was renamed Ciudad de Mahón, alongside obtaining a new paint job.

=== Irish Ferries ===
In November 2021, it was announced that the Ciudad de Mahón was acquired by Irish Continental Group, and was due to return to Dover on the Dover-Calais sailing in Q1 2022. She sailed her last sailing for Trasmediterránea on January 31, 2022. The next day, ownership was transferred and she was renamed Isle of Inisheer, after Inisheer, the smallest of the Aran Islands. A week later, she departed Barcelona for the Fayard A/S shipyard next to Munkebo, near Odense in Denmark for re-installation of cow-catchers, sliding doors and other necessary modifications for operation into and out of Dover.

== See also ==
- MS Kaiarahi, a sister ship
- MS Finbo Cargo, a sister ship
