= MV Ulysses (2000) =

Vehicle and passenger ferry operated by Irish Ferries

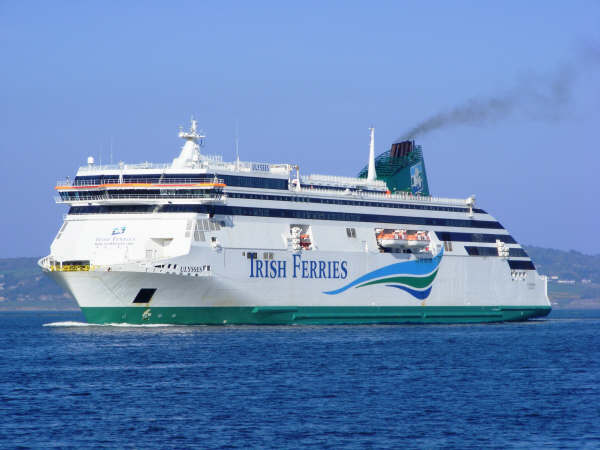
- MV Ulysses approaching Dublin Port

History
- Name: Ulysses
- Owner: Irish Continental Group
- Operator: Irish Ferries
- Port of registry: Limassol, Cyprus
- Route: Dublin–Holyhead
- Builder: Aker Finnyards (Rauma, Finland)
- Cost: €110 million; IR£80 million
- Yard number: 429
- Laid down: 24 January 2000
- Launched: 1 September 2000
- Completed: 2001
- In service: March 2001–present
- Identification: IMO number: 9214991; MMSI number: 209952000; Call sign: C4HP2
- Status: In service

General characteristics
- Type: Ro-pax ferry
- Tonnage: 50,938 GT
- Length: 209.2 m (686 ft)
- Beam: 31.84 m (104.5 ft)
- Height: 51 m (167 ft)
- Draught: 6.3 m (21 ft)
- Depth: 15.75 m (51.7 ft) (moulded)
- Decks: 12
- Ice class: 1A
- Installed power: 4 × MaK 9M43
- Propulsion: Two shafts; LIPS type 4C16 controllable pitch propellers
- Speed: 22 knots (41 km/h; 25 mph)
- Capacity: 1,938 passengers; 1,342 cars; 241 trucks; 4,076 lanemeters

MV Ulysses is a roll-on/roll-off car ferry owned and operated by Irish Ferries. The ship was launched on 1 September 2000 at Aker Finnyards shipyard in Rauma, Finland and services the Dublin–Holyhead route.

The vessel has 12 decks, with a total height of 167.5 feet (51.1 m) from keel to mast. It has five vehicle decks, including a stowable mezzanine deck consisting of two swing decks, which are lowered to accommodate a greater number of vehicles up to 2 metres high. These swing decks are primarily used in holiday seasons when there is a much greater number of passenger vehicles. When launched she was the world's largest car ferry in terms of vehicle capacity.

== Design ==
Ulysses was designed by Aker Finnyards and based on their Cruise Ferry 4000 concept design. She measures 50,938 GT, and is 209 metres (686 ft) long, with a beam of 31.2 metres (102 ft) and a draft of 6.4 metres (21 ft). She can carry 2,000 passengers and crew, 1,342 cars or 241 articulated trucks and trailers (or a mix of cars and freight vehicles). She has 228 passenger berths in 96 cabins, with passenger space spread over 12 decks.

She is powered by four MaK M43 diesel engines, each delivering 7,800 kilowatts (10,500 hp) at 500rpm for a total power output of 31,200 kilowatts (41,800 hp), that give her a service speed of 22 knots (25 mph) via two propellers. She also has three thrusters at the bow and one at the stern to aid in maneuvering.

== History ==
Irish Ferries ordered Ulysses from Aker Finnyards in late 1999. She was laid down on 24 January 2000 and launched on 1 September. She was handed over to her owners, Irish Continental Group, at the Rauma yard on 22 February 2001, leaving under the command of Captain Peter Ferguson on 28 February and arriving in Dublin Bay at 07:00 on Sunday 4 March. The naming ceremony was undertaken by swimmer Mairead Berry.

Following the 2003 sailing season, Ulysses underwent a refit at the A&P Group's Birkenhead shipyard. She has sailed on Irish Ferries' Dublin–Holyhead route for her entire career, uninterrupted until the 2018 season when she suffered mechanical problems with her starboard propeller, requiring drydock repairs that took several weeks in June and July. On 12 December 2024 she serviced the Dublin-Cherbourg route for the first time, docking in Cherbourg on 13 December 2024.
