= Death of Benny Whitehouse =

Benny Whitehouse was a 35 year old Irishman who was shot dead in Balbriggan as part of a suspected criminal feud.

Whitehouse and his partner had dropped their children off at school when their car, parked on Clonard Street, was approached by a gunman who shot Whitehouse dead and injured his partner. Whitehouse had dealt illicit drugs and there was a price of €20,000 put on his head.

== Investigation ==
A couple was arrested in May 2015 and questioned about the shooting.

=== Links to other crimes ===
Gardaí suspect that the disappearances of William Maughan and Anna Varslavane happened because the killers of Whitehouse assumed that the couple were going to pass information to the Gardaí about the shooting. The gang suspected of the abduction of the couple has since become involved in the Drogheda feud.
