= Bridges of Drogheda =

Series of Irish bridges

There are seven bridges in and around Drogheda, Ireland.

== Boyne River Bridge ==
The Mary McAleese Boyne Valley Bridge is Ireland's longest cable-stayed bridge, located 3.1 kilometres west of Drogheda.

== Boyne Viaduct ==
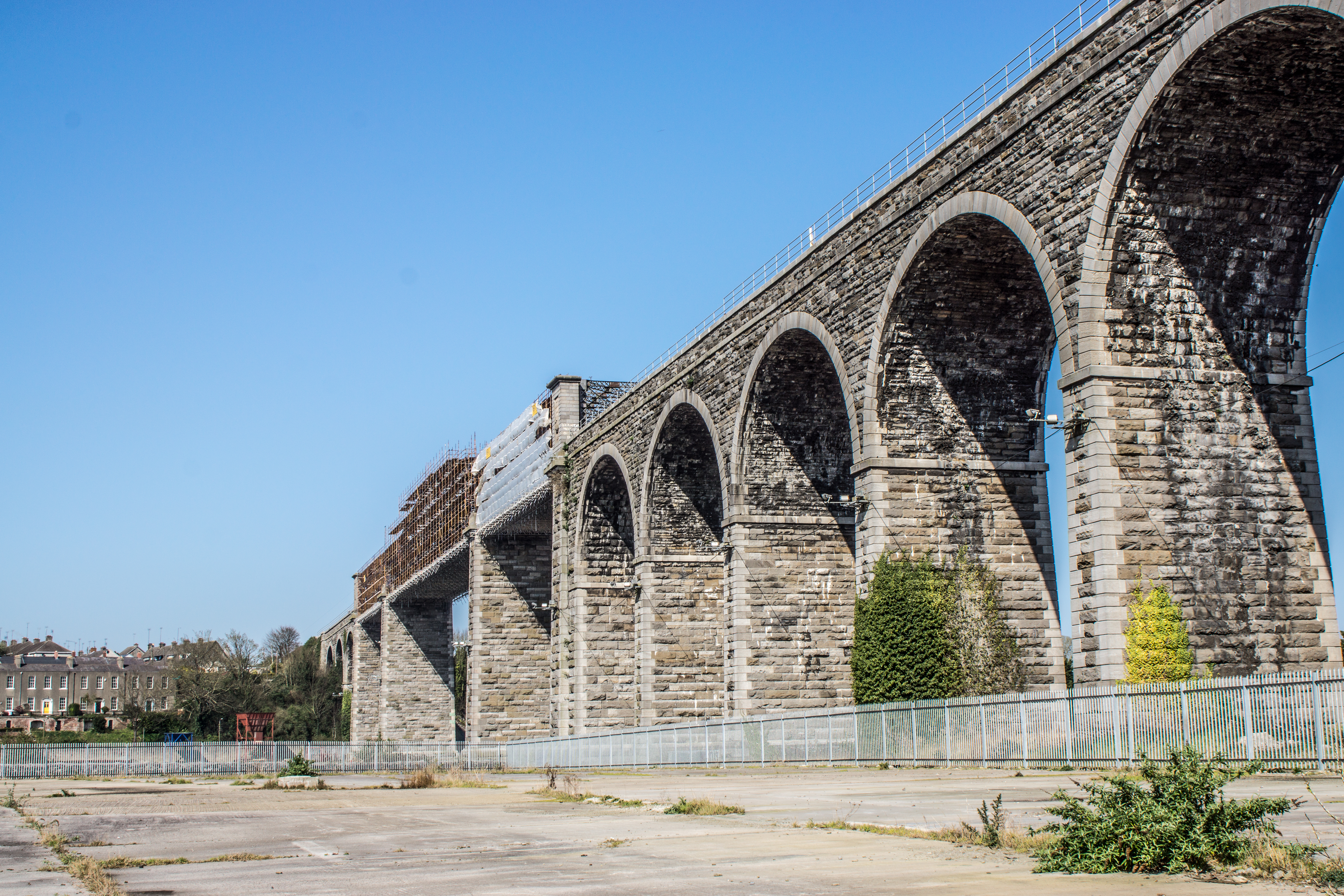
Boyne Valley Viaduct, Drogheda (2012)

The Boyne Viaduct is a railway bridge that crosses the River Boyne in Drogheda, carrying the main Dublin–Belfast railway line.

== Bridge of Peace ==
The Bridge of Peace is the second-furthest-west bridge in Drogheda. It was built as a part of an inner by-pass of the town in the 1970s.

== Dominic's Bridge ==
Dominic's Bridge is one of the closest bridges to Drogheda's town centre. It was manufactured by Grendons of Drogheda in 1863. It is now a pedestrian bridge, one of two in Drogheda, but was previously also used by motor-vehicles until its replacement by "The Bridge of Peace" in the 1970s.

== (Hugh) de Lacy Bridge ==
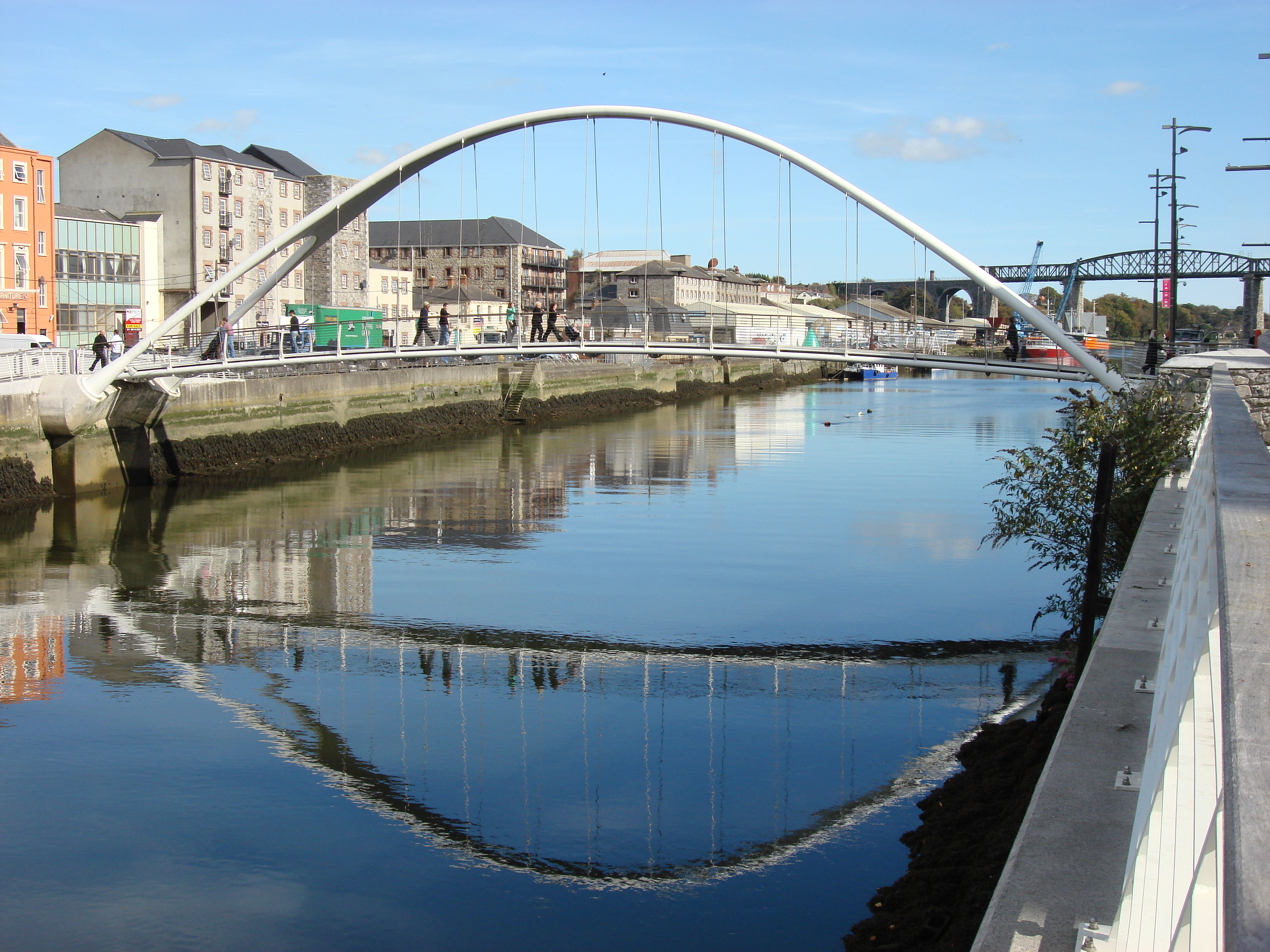
de Lacy bridge with Boyne Viaduct in background

The de Lacy Bridge is one of two pedestrian bridges in Drogheda. It was part of phase one of the Scotch Hall development on the south side of the river. There is a plaque on the bridge indicating it was unveiled on 10 November 2005 by Tommy Murphy, the then mayor of Drogheda.

== St. Mary's Bridge ==
St. Mary's Bridge is the main bridge to the centre of Drogheda. It was, for hundreds of years, the site of the only bridge at Drogheda. It is at the meeting of the two major south side roads the N51 and the Marsh Road. The bridge was reconstructed in precast prestressed concrete by the Office of Public Works in 1983, replacing a masonry two-arch structure designed by John Neville, County surveyor for Co. Louth, which was built between 1863 and 1868.

== Haymarket Bridge ==
This bridge is also a major bridge in Drogheda. It is flanked by a McDonald's restaurant and a health centre on the south side. On the north side: Haymarket car park and a block of apartments. As of 2023, it received an upgrade to accommodate the new and upcoming Westgate Vision.
