= Irish Ferries =

Irish maritime transport company

Irish Ferries Ltd
- Type: Division
- Industry: Transportation & Tourism
- Predecessor: British and Irish Steam Packet Company
- Founded: 1973
- Headquarters: Dublin, Ireland
- Number of locations: Dublin Port, Ireland; Holyhead Port, Wales; Rosslare Europort, Ireland; Pembroke Dock, Wales; Cherbourg, France; Port of Dover, England; Port of Calais, France.
- Area served: United Kingdom, Ireland & France.
- Key people: Eamonn Rothwell, CEO, Andrew Sheen Managing Director
- Services: Passenger & vehicle transportation, Freight transportation;
- Parent: Irish Continental Group
- Divisions: Irish Ferries; Eucon
- Subsidiaries: Irish Ferries Freight; Dublin Ferryport Terminals; Belfast Container Terminal
- Website: www.irishferries.com

Irish Ferries route map. Since July 2025.

Irish Ferries is an Irish ferry and transport company that operates passenger and freight services on routes between Ireland, Britain and Continental Europe, including Dublin Port–Holyhead; Rosslare Europort to Pembroke, Dublin Port-Cherbourg and more recently Dover in the UK to Calais in France.

The company is a division of the Irish Continental Group (ICG) which trades on the Irish Stock Exchange and the London Stock Exchange. ICG also owns the Eucon container line which operates vessels on routes operating between Ireland and the continent.

Irish Ferries' flagship, Ulysses, is currently the largest ROPAX ferry operating on the Irish Sea and when launched in 2001 was the world's largest car ferry in terms of car-carrying capacity. Other ships in the fleet include W.B. Yeats, Isle of Inishmore, Isle of Innisfree, Isle of Inisheer, James Joyce and the fast ferry Dublin Swift (preceded by HSC Jonathan Swift, which operated until 2018). The company also charters ro-pax vessel Oscar Wilde (formerly named Spirit of Britain), with a purchase option on the vessel.

== History ==
Irish Continental Line was formed in 1973 as a joint venture between Irish Shipping, Fearnley & Eger and Swedish company Lion Ferry. It originally operated on the Rosslare–Le Havre route with the 547 berth, 210 car ferry Saint Patrick. When Irish Shipping went into liquidation in 1984, Irish Continental Line was sold off in a management buyout and emerged as Irish Continental Group.

In 1992, ICG took over the British and Irish Steam Packet Company Limited, a nationalised company which traded under the name B&I Line and operated ferry services between Dublin and Holyhead and between Rosslare and Pembroke Dock.

In 2005, Irish Ferries replaced all its workers with foreign agency labour that was cheaper than that of its rivals, such as P&O Ferries, Stena Line and DFDS, thereby undercutting their prices. Its competitive practice, as well as the use of security personnel to carry out the replacement of its crewmembers, were described by many in the industry as a "blueprint" for P&O's 2022 sacking of hundreds of its seafarers.

=== Investment ===
As part of its offer to buy B&I Line, management at ICG undertook to invest in replacing what was an ageing fleet. Over the following decade, a programme of fleet renewal was undertaken involving investment of €500 million to create what was described as the most modern ferry fleet in western Europe.

New vessels were built such as Ulysses, Isle of Innisfree (now on charter in New Zealand as Kaitaki), Isle of Inishmore and a fast ferry Jonathan Swift, all for service on its Ireland–UK routes. As a result, the company put itself in a position to attract increased passenger and freight business, influenced by the modern facilities and improved reliability of each vessel and the extra capacity that was available on board.

On 31 May 2016, ICG announced that it had entered into an agreement with the German company Flensburger Schiffbau-Gesellschaft to build a cruise ferry MV W.B. Yeats at a contract price of €144 million. The new cruise ferry can accommodate 1,880 passengers and crew, with 435 cabins and with capacity for 2,800 lane metres of freight (165 freight vehicles) plus an additional dedicated car deck with capacity for 300 passenger cars. Summer 2018 bookings for the new ferry were cancelled due to delays in its delivery from the shipyard.

In March 2021, Irish Ferries, in a surprise announcement, revealed that they were opening a new route between Dover and Calais, due to start in June, later revealed to be 29 June. This is the first such route that Irish Ferries operates which does not call in Ireland, with Dover and Calais being two major UK and French ports respectively. The service began with the MS Isle of Inishmore (1996) operating between the two ports, with two more ships due to enter service – the MS Isle of Innisfree (1991, ex-Calais Seaways) in December 2021, and MS Isle of Inisheer (ex- "Ciudad de Mahón) in April 2022.

== Awards ==
In 2001, the newly completed vessel Ulysses was awarded the title 'Most Significant Newbuild – Ferry' by Lloyds List Cruise & Ferry. In 2019, the latest addition to its fleet, W.B. Yeats was awarded the 'Ferry Concept Award' and the 'Interior Architecture Award' at the international Shippax Industry Awards.

== Fleet ==
In 2005, Irish Ferries began to re-register its fleet under flags of convenience, enabling the company to save approximately €11.5 million by replacing crew with agency staff. As of August 2025, all vessels owned by Irish Ferries or Irish Continental Group are registered in Cyprus.

=== Current fleet ===
Ship	Built	Entered service	Route	Gross tonnage	Notes	Flag	Image
Ulysses	2000	March 2001	Dublin - Holyhead	50,938 GT	One of the largest ro-pax ferries currently operating on the Irish Sea, carrying up to 1,938 passengers, 1,342 cars and 241 trucks.	Cyprus	
W.B. Yeats	2018	January 2019	Dublin - Cherbourg	50,400 GT	Carrying up to 1,800 passengers, with 440 cabins; 300-car deck and 165 freight vehicles (or additional cars)	Cyprus	
Oscar Wilde	2010	June 2024	Dover - Calais	47,592 GT	Bareboat chartered from P&O purchase option. Carrying up to 2,000 passengers	Cyprus	
James Joyce	2007	May 2023 - January 2025, May 2025 - onwards	Dublin - Holyhead	36,249 GT	Originally, chartered for 20 months between 2023 - 2025; returned to Tallink in Jan 2025, however purchased by Irish Ferries in April 2025. Renamed from Oscar Wilde in June 2024 when the next one entered service.	Cyprus	
Dublin Swift	2001	April 2018	Dublin - Holyhead	8,403 GT	Operating a seasonal service. Carrying up to 820 passengers and 220 cars.	Cyprus	
Isle of Inishmore	1997	March 1997	Dover - Calais	34,031 GT	Carrying up to 2,200 passengers and 855 cars.	Cyprus	
Isle of Innisfree	1991	December 2021	Rosslare - Pembroke	28,838 GT	Bought from DFDS Seaways. Entered service 15 December 2021.	Cyprus	
Isle of Inisheer	2000	April 2022	Dublin - Cherbourg	22,152 GT	Bought from Trasmediterránea. Entered service in 2022.	Cyprus	

=== Former ships ===
Ship	Built	Years in service	Route	Gross Tonnage	Status as of 2021	Flag	Image
Saint Patrick	1973	1973 - 1982	Rosslare - Le Havre; Dublin - Holyhead	7,819 GT	Carried out charters to Normandy Ferries and B&I Line. In 1982 renamed the St. Colum 1 and transferred to Belfast Car Ferries. Scrapped as EXPRESS P at Alang, India in August 2005		
Saint Killian; Saint Killian II	1978	1978 - 1981; 1982 - 1997	Rosslare / Cork - Le Havre / Cherbourg / Roscoff	7,125 GT; 10,256 GT	Out of service 1981 - 1982 for lengthening. Scrapped in Alang, India in 2007.		
Breizh Izel	1970	1981	Rosslare - Cherbourg / Roscoff	6,576 GT	Chartered for a few weeks in July.		
Saint Patrick II	1982	1982 - 1997	Rosslare / Cork - Cherbourg / Le Havre / Roscoff; Rosslare - Pembroke Dock; Dublin - Holyhead	7,984 GT	Carried out lots of charters during time at Irish Ferries. Since 2002 sailing as C.T.M.A. Vacancier for Coopérative de transport maritime et aérien. Scrapped as Ancier in March 2024 at Alang.		
Gotland	1973	1988	Rosslare - Cherbourg / Le Havre	6,642 GT			
Thomas Wehr	1977	1992		7,628 GT			
Pride of Bilbao	1985	did not sail for Irish Ferries		37,799 GT	Bought in 1993 then chartered out to P&O Ferries. Sold to St. Peter Line in 2014.		
Isle of Innisfree	1995	1995 - 2002	Dublin - Holyhead; Rosslare - Pembroke Dock	22,365 GT	From 2002 chartered out as Pride of Cherbourg, Stena Challenger, Challenger and Kaitaki. Sold to Interislander in 2017.		
Isle of Inishmore; Isle of Inishturk	1995	1995 - 1996; 1996 - 1997	Dublin - Liverpool; Dublin - Holyhead; Rosslare - Pembroke Dock	6,807 GT; 9,700 GT	Since 1997 sailing as Madeleine for Coopérative de transport maritime et aérien.		
Purbeck	1978	1996	Dublin - Holyhead	6,507 GT	Chartered for 5 months.		
Peveril	1971	1997	Rosslare - Pembroke Dock	1,950 GT	Chartered from Isle of Man Steam Packet for a week in November.		
Normandy	1981	1998 - 2007	Rosslare - Pembroke Dock; Cork - Rosslare; Rosslare - Cherbourg; Cork - Roscoff	17,043 GT	Chartered for first year of service. Sold to Equinox Offshore Accommodation and chartered to the Morocco-based FerriMaroc in 2008. Scrapped at Alang, 2012.		
Jonathan Swift	1999	1999 - 2018	Dublin - Holyhead	5,989 GT	Sold to Balearia Eurolineas Maritimas, Denia, Spain and renamed Cecilia Payne.		
Leili	1999	2005	Rosslare - Pembroke Dock	7,606 GT	Chartered for 1 month.		
Oscar Wilde	1987	2007 - 2019	Rosslare - Cherbourg / Roscoff; Rosslare - Pembroke Dock (relief); Dublin - Holyhead	31,914 GT	Sold to Grandi Navi Veloci and reflagged to Cyprus		
Epsilon	2011	2014 - 2023	Dublin - Holyhead; Dublin - Cherbourg	26,375 GT	Chartered to Irish Ferries from Caronte SRL, charter ended a year after being sold to Euroafrica.		
Stena Foreteller	2002	2020		24,688 GT	Chartered from Stena Line for 3 months.		
Mega Express Four	1995	2021	Dublin - Holyhead; Dublin - Cherbourg	24,186 GT	Chartered to Irish Ferries for 2 months to cover refits and flagged Italian.		
Blue Star 1	1999	2021 - 2023	Rosslare - Pembroke Dock	29,858 GT	Charter completed after 2 years, returned to Blue Star Ferries and flagged Greece.		
Norbay	1994	2023 - 2024	Rosslare - Pembroke Dock; Dublin - Holyhead	17,464 GT	Chartered for 6 Months from P&O		
