= Drogheda feud =

Series of allegedly connected crimes, Ireland, 2018-2020

Drogheda Feud
- Date: 2017-
- Location: Drogheda, County Louth
- Caused by: Organized crime gang split
- Goals: Control of drug trafficking territory
- Methods: Beatings, stabbings, shootings, pipe bomb attacks, arson, murder
- Status: Ongoing

Parties
Maguire - Price criminal organization	Boylan brothers criminal organization

Lead figures
Owen Maguire, Cornelius Price (deceased)	Keith Boylan, Josh Boylan, Paul Crosby, Richie Carberry (deceased), Robbie Lawlor (deceased)

Casualties
- Deaths: 4

The Drogheda feud is a series of allegedly connected crimes in Drogheda, Ireland. Four people have been killed as a result of the feud. The feud began in 2017 when a drug trafficking-focused organized crime gang split into two divisions, with one faction led by Richie Carberry along with the Boylan brothers aged in their 20s from the Moneymore estate on the north side of town, and the other headed by Irish Travellers Owen Maguire and Cornelius Price.

== Background ==
Since 2018 two criminal gangs in Drogheda have tried to control the illegal drug trade in the town.

== Shooting of Owen Maguire ==
Owen Maguire was shot six times by a gunman on 5 July 2018 at his home in Cement Road, Drogheda. He was known to Gardaí though his most serious conviction was for affray near his home, for which he was sentenced to six months imprisonment. His associates were the main targets of an operation by the Criminal Assets Bureau in April 2018. He is a former associate of convicted criminal Cornelius Price. One of the bullets that hit him was lodged in his spine. Maguire was left paralysed by the shooting. In November 2022, Robbie Lawlor (who was the brother-in-law of Richie Carberry) was named in court documents submitted by the Criminal Assets Bureau as the gunman who attempted to assassinate Maguire.

Local councillor Kenneth Flood said “In July, after the shooting, Gardaí openly said they didn’t have the resources to police the division. Then you have the cops saying they don’t have enough people to do the job. The criminals are looking at this and they’re thinking, ‘It’s Christmas’." He called for more resources for Gardaí and a more intelligent use of resources. TD Fergus O'Dowd echoed the call for more resources and said that Drogheda Gardaí must be afforded all necessary resources to tackle recent crime.

Since the shooting of Owen Maguire the two gangs have exchanged a series of tit-for-tat attacks.

Louth Gardaí had their leave restricted by November 2018 in order to control the violence.

== Abduction and beating in Moneymore ==
In November 2018 a man was found stripped, beaten and stabbed in a house in Moneymore estate. A rival gang had abducted him a short time before. After Gardaí had rescued him, the fire brigade had to deal with a burning car that had gas cylinders inside. The abduction had happened about 24 hours after an arson attack that had destroyed a car. In June 2020, warrants were issued at Dublin Circuit Criminal Court for the arrest of Josh Boylan and his brother Keith Boylan in relation to the earlier November 2018 incident in Moneymore estate. Defense lawyers submitted that both men had gone into hiding due to a genuine threat to their lives. Prosecuting lawyers informed the court that the defendants appeared to have left the jurisdiction and bench warrants would be required to launch any future extradition proceedings against them.

== Lawrence's Park arson attack ==
A house in Lawrence's Park, near Moneymore estate, was petrol-bombed. Further petrol-bomb attacks were seen in the following days.

== Shooting of Brendan Maguire ==
Brendan Maguire, a 40-year-old brother of Owen, was the target of an attempted assassination on the afternoon of 26 February 2019, as he returned to his car after a gym workout at the M1 retail park on the northern outskirts of Drogheda. A black Volkswagen Passat was seen driving past and a passenger fired 5 shots from a 9mm pistol, with 3 bullets hitting Maguire in the neck and torso. Maguire was then rushed to the nearby Our Lady of Lourdes's Hospital to undergo emergency surgery under armed Garda protection. He spent a number of weeks in hospital recovering from the shooting. He had previously received a suspended sentence of ten months for brawling.

Local politician Ged Nash criticised Gardaí senior management and the minister for not retaining more probationers. He also said that the gangs were "running riot".

== Hardmans Gardens shooting ==
In April 2019 a man was shot and wounded outside a house in Hardmans Gardens at approximately 4:30pm. Up to nine shots were fired at him from a busy street - Gardaí described the attack as "indiscriminate". The shooting was followed by more arson and bomb attacks.

== Emergency Response Unit deployed ==
In April 2019 Garda Commissioner Drew Harris announced that the Garda Emergency Response Unit was deployed to Drogheda as part of the plan to deal with the feuding gangs.

== Protest against feud ==
On 4 May 2019 there was a protest by around 500 people in Drogheda against the feud. Mayor Frank Godfrey said that the feud did not reflect the people of Drogheda or their values.

== Murder of Keith Brannigan ==
On 27 August 2019 Keith Brannigan was shot dead in Clogherhead while working on the decking of a mobile home. The murder is being linked to the feud. More than 90 incidents including two attempted murders and petrol bombings had been logged by Gardaí.

== Murder of Richie Carberry ==
On 4 November 2019 Richie Carberry arrived at his home around 11:40pm and was shot by a gunman. Gardaí regarded him as a drug dealer who had supplied one side in the feud and one line of inquiry is that he may have been killed by the same side of the feud that murdered Brannigan. He had survived a previous murder attempt the previous March and he had been formally warned by Gardaí that his life was in danger.

== Mugging of Robbie Lawlor ==
Robbie Lawlor was a convicted criminal who was released from prison in December 2019. He was mugged after leaving a gym later that month, which was filmed by his assailants. The assailants stole his gym bag and flip-flops and posted photos of them wearing the latter after the mugging. The assault was allegedly at the behest of a criminal foe of Lawlor.

== Shooting of John Myles ==
John Myles was a taxi driver who was shot while driving over the Bridge of Peace on 13 January 2020. Gardaí and the driver suspect the front-seat passenger was the intended target.

== Murder of Keane Mulready-Woods ==
On 12 January 2020 teenager Keane Mulready-Woods was last seen in Drogheda around 6pm. Human remains found in Coolock and Drumcondra on 13 and 15 January 2020 were confirmed by Gardaí to be his by 17 January. His murder was part of the Drogheda feud. The presence of flip-flops in the bag of Keane Mulready-Woods remains dumped in Coolock was widely interpreted as a threat not to cross Lawlor. Paul Crosby was later sentenced to 10 years in prison for his involvement in the murder of Keane Mulready-Woods.

Taoiseach Leo Varadkar said on 17 January 2020 that he wanted to set up a task force to tackle crime in Drogheda similar to one set up to tackle crime in North inner city Dublin.

=== January 2020 rally ===
Drogheda Mayor Paul Bell organised a rally for 25 January. The mayor said that the protest was against gang feuding and crime that had affected the town for the previous two years, and to ask those responsible for the death of Keane Mulready-Woods to reveal the location of the rest of his remains. He called for new legislation, new powers, and extra resources for Gardaí, and criticised those involved in taking illicit drugs as they contributed to the problems caused by the gangs. Taoiseach Leo Varadkar, Fianna Fáil leader Micheál Martin, Labour Party leader Brendan Howlin, Sinn Féin leader Mary Lou McDonald and Aontú leader Peadar Tóibín attended. Louise Mahoney, director of addiction treatment service the Red Door Project, called for more resources and long-term solutions.

=== Funeral ===
A funeral for Keane Mulready-Woods was held on Thursday 13 February 2020 at Holy Family Church, Ballsgrove, Drogheda.

== Murder of Robbie Lawlor ==
On 4 April 2020, Robbie Lawlor was shot around 11:50am outside a house in Etna Drive, Ardoyne in north Belfast. He was suspected of ordering the murder and dismembering of Keane Mulready-Woods. Lawlor was originally from Dublin, but had lived in County Meath and was heavily involved in organised crime, including the Drogheda feud. He had been threatened by one faction in the Drogheda feud but was also at odds with a major Dublin criminal who is suspected of several murders including that of Alan Ryan. Three men suspected of the murder were arrested and questioned by the PSNI at Musgrave police station.

The shooting was condemned by Detective Superintendent Jason Murphy, as a callous murder, as a danger to the local community and adding to stress in the community during the coronavirus pandemic. The shooting was also condemned by Minister for Justice Naomi Long and Sinn Féin MLA Gerry Kelly.

In June 2020, Warren Crossan, a dissident Republican who had been arrested after the murder of Robbie Lawlor, was shot dead in the Rodney Drive area of West Belfast. Police are following two lines of investigation into his shooting - one into the shooting of Robbie Lawlor, and one into a feud among dissident Republicans.

In September 2020, Gardaí raided a number of properties, including that of a leader of a Drogheda gang. The raid was part of investigations into the murder of Robbie Lawlor, and organised crime in general. Lawlor was suspected of being behind a failed 2018 attempt on the life of the gang leader. Gardaí believe Lawlor was murdered as payback for both the attempted murder of the gang leader and the murder of Keane Mulready-Woods. The primary suspects are two Limerick criminals involved in organised crime for over a decade.

== Money laundering charges ==
In December 2024 four women were charged with money laundering in relation to the feud.

== Naming of brothers ==
Keith Boylan and his brother Josh, both of Moneymore, were named in court for the first time in June 2025. Keith was named as leader of the Boylan Organised Crime Group and Josh as second in command. The men were named during a sentence hearing for three women who have pleaded guilty to money laundering for them. The crime group is involved in the large-scale import of illicit drugs.
