= Dublin Port =

Leading sea port of both country and island of Ireland

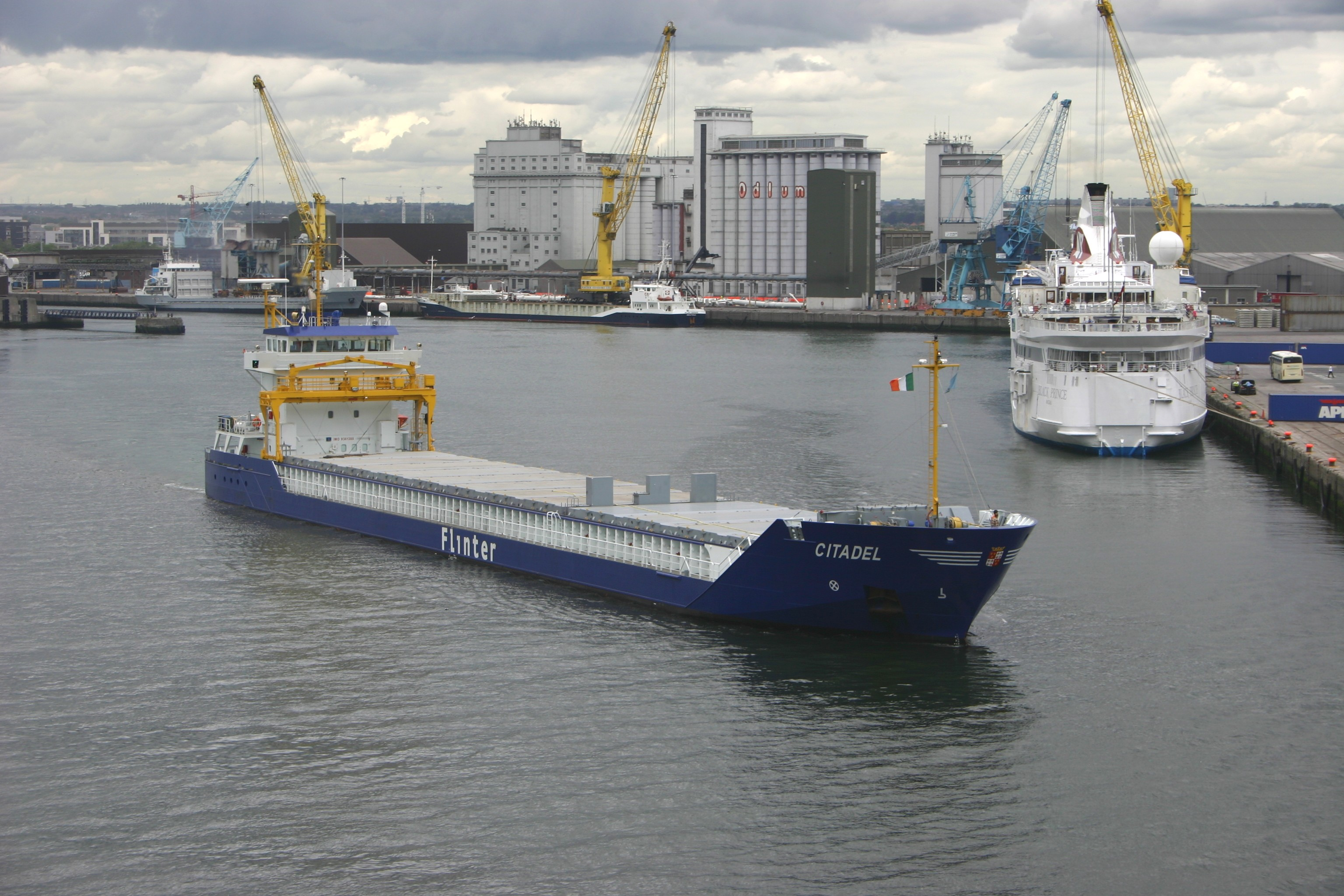
- Dublin Port – Western Basin
- Interactive map of Dublin Port
- Location within Ireland

Location
- Country: Ireland
- Coordinates: 53.34609°N 6.20831°W
- UN/LOCODE: IEDUB

Details
- Operated by: Dublin Port Company
- Type of Harbor: River port
- Draft depth: depth 11.0 m.

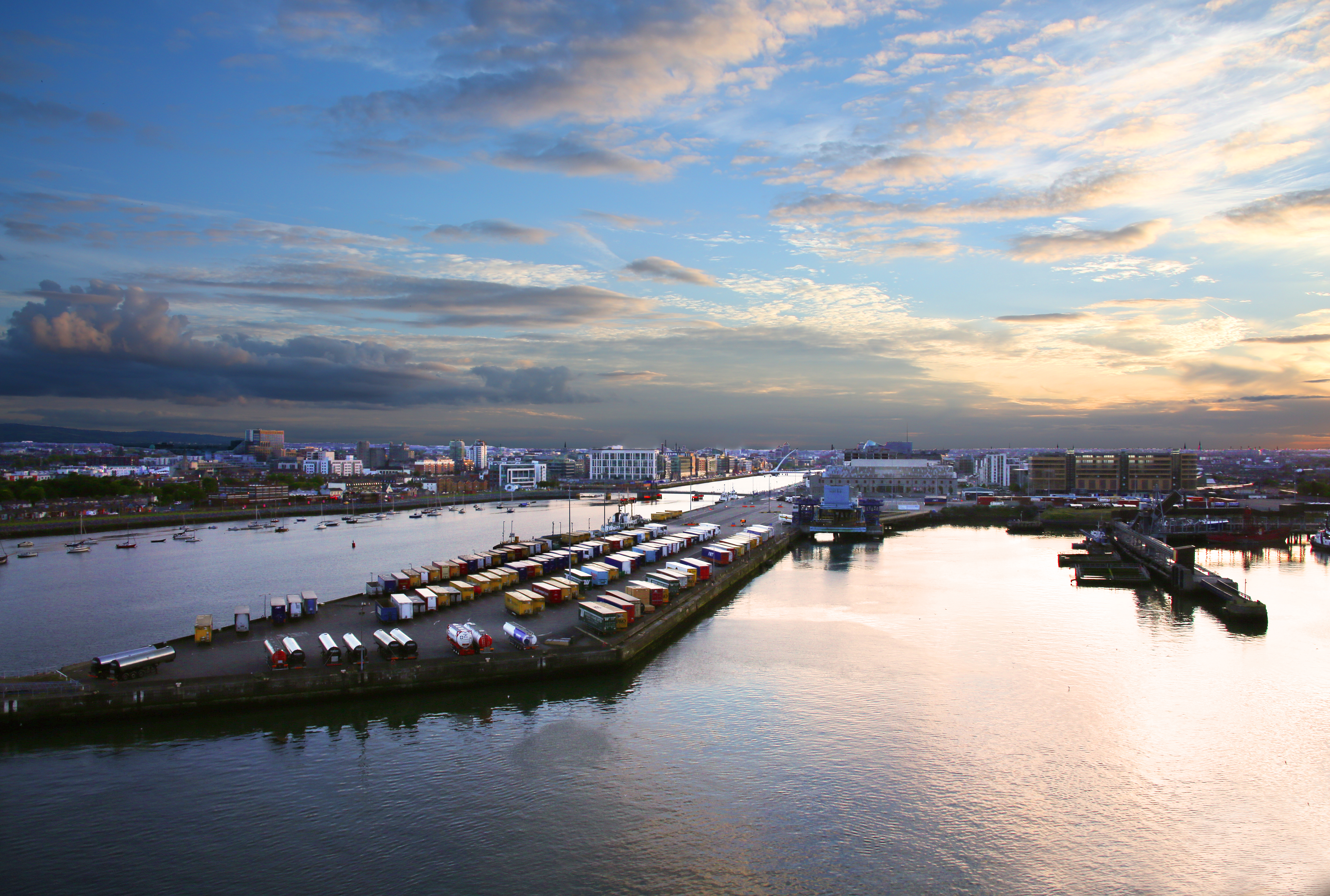
Dublin Port as seen from Dublin Bay

Dublin Port (Irish: Calafort Átha Cliath) is the seaport of Dublin, Ireland, of both historical and contemporary economic importance. Approximately two-thirds of Ireland's maritime freight traffic, in turn almost 90% of all freight, travels via the port, which is by far the busiest on the island of Ireland.

The port lies mostly on the northern side of the mouth area of the River Liffey, with an enclave on the southern side also. It is served by road and rail. The port is operated by a State-owned commercial company, successor to bodies dating back to the 18th century. Dublin's port was previously located more than 2 km upstream.

The port is operated by the semi-state Dublin Port Company (DPC), incorporated in 1997, which succeeded the Dublin Port and Docks Board established under the Dublin Port Act 1867. The company oversees port infrastructure, pilotage services within Dublin Bay, and manages the port's lighthouses. The port handled 38.1 million tonnes of cargo in 2019, with around 7,000 ship visits recorded as of 2025.

The history of the port dates to the medieval period, when it was located on the south bank of the Liffey near Christ Church Cathedral. Its development accelerated from 1707 with the establishment of the Ballast Office, followed by the construction of the Great South Wall beginning in 1715 and the Bull Wall completed in 1825. The advent of containerisation in the latter half of the 20th century drove the port further downstream to accommodate vessels requiring deeper water.

Dublin Port offers Roll-on/roll-off passenger ferry services across the Irish Sea to Holyhead, as well as seasonal services to Douglas, Isle of Man and year-round services to Cherbourg, France. It is also a growing destination for cruise liners, recording 158 cruise ship visits in 2019. A master plan published in 2012, covering development up to 2040, sets out capacity improvements while committing to no expansion into Dublin Bay.

== Location ==
The modern Dublin Port is located on either side of the River Liffey, out to its mouth. On the north side of the river, the main part (205 hectares or 510 acres) of the port lies at the end of East Wall and North Wall, from Alexandra Quay. The element of the port on the south side of the river is much smaller (51 hectares or 130 acres) and lies at the beginning of the Poolbeg peninsula.

=== Access ===
The port is served by road, with a direct connection from the Dublin Port Tunnel to the northern part (and so a connection with Dublin's M50 orbital motorway).

There is no passenger rail service to either part of Dublin Port but the northern part is served by freight rail. The northern part is also served by Nolan Coaches Route 853 Dublin City to Dublin Port and Dublin Bus, with route 53 and by a Luas terminus just outside the port area. The southern part can be reached by bus.

== Dublin Port Company ==
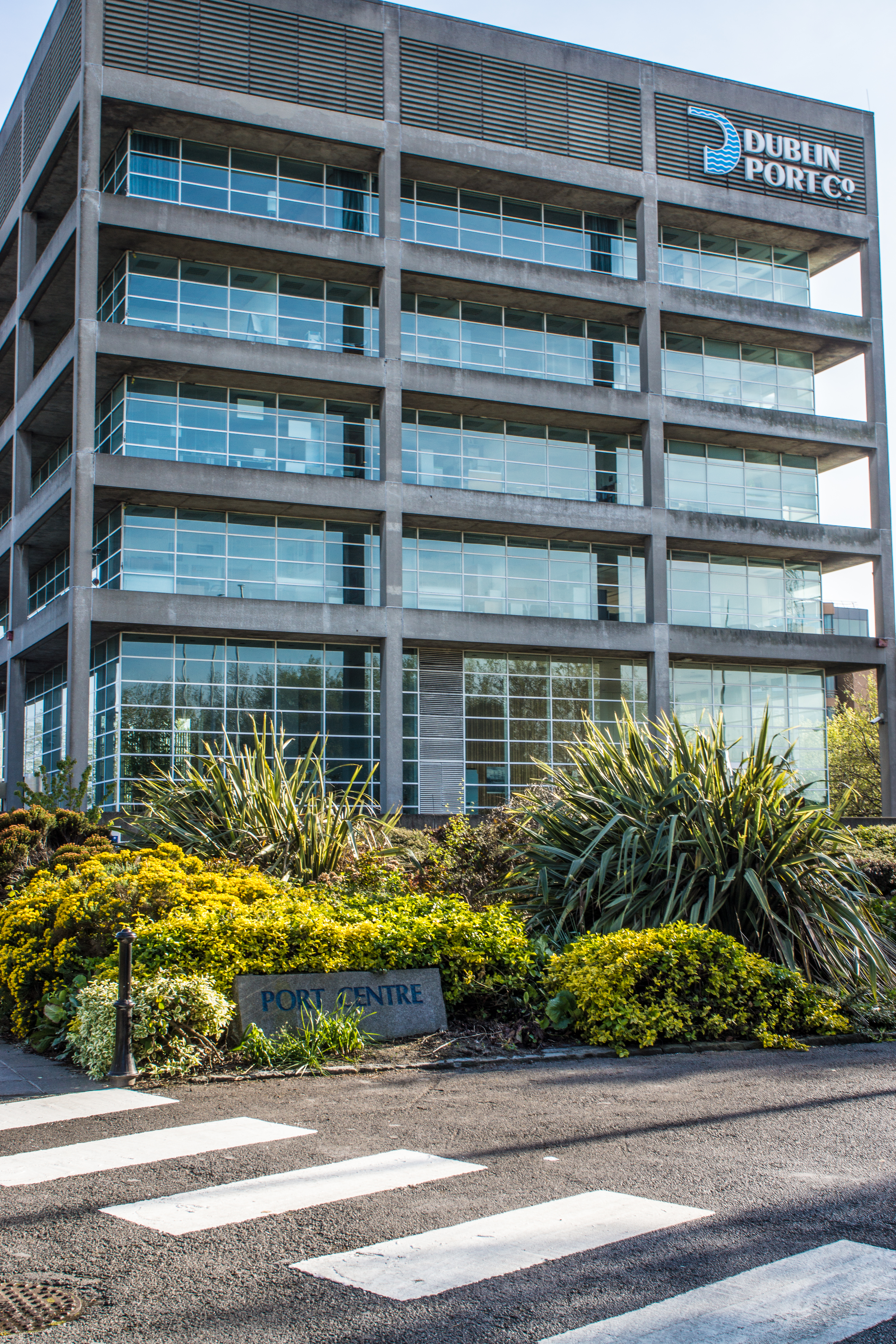
Dublin Port Company offices

The port is operated by the semi-state Dublin Port Company (DPC), incorporated on 28 February 1997. It succeeded the Dublin Port and Docks Board formed by the Dublin Port Act 1867 (30 & 31 Vict. c. lxxxi), which was created when the Dublin Ballast Board, founded in 1707, had the Commissioners of Irish Lights split out as a separate body.

The headquarters of the DPC are located just beyond the main port entrance on the northern side of the Liffey. In 2017, the area around the headquarters was rebuilt with the installation of a heritage crane and the creation of a maritime-themed garden.

The company is responsible for the infrastructure of the port, with individual operations run by tenants such as State authorities, notably the customs service, as well as ferry, freight and oil companies, terminal operators, and stevedores. The port company is also responsible for pilotage services within Dublin Bay, and manages the three port lighthouses (but not those of Howth or Kish Bank). It also formerly operated two drydocks, which were closed in 2016.

=== Volumes ===
According to DPC, the port handled 23.5 million tonnes of cargo in 2003, as well as 1,426,000 passengers. That year 7,917 ships docked in the port, including 54 cruise liners carrying 54,000 visitors. In April 2010, the company announced its "busiest week ever", following restrictions placed on European airspace because of the eruption of the Eyjafjallajökull volcano in Iceland. Some 72,118 passengers were reported to have travelled through the ferry terminals during the week of 15–21 April that year, and that week saw the culmination of increased trade in Dublin Port, as the company's figures for the first quarter of 2010 would eventually reveal. March 2010 saw a 13.5% trade increase when compared with March 2009, and that month was declared by the company as the fourth consecutive month of trade increase since the economic downturn. The figures of imports and exports declined during the depression of 2010 but then increased during the decade and in 2019, 38.1 million tonnes of cargo was handled and there were 7,898 ship movements of which 158 were cruise ships.

As of 2025, the port had around 7,000 ship visits, of which 2,000 used pilotage services. Dublin accounted for around two thirds of all port-handled freight, with almost 90% of all freight to Ireland going by sea.

== History ==
=== Medieval port ===
The medieval port of Dublin was located on the south bank of the Liffey near Christ Church Cathedral, a few kilometres upstream from its current location.

=== Ballast Office ===
On 17 September 1707, Thomas Burgh, the Surveyor General of Ireland, read a paper to the Dublin Society entitled 'Some Thoughts for the Improveing [sic] the Harbour of Dublin' in which the dangers of the bar of Dublin (a shallow sandbank which ran across the mouth of the river) was mentioned as well as a proposed basin in which ships could be secure from inclement weather or hostile attack.

Dublin Port and Ballast Office Act 1707
- Act of Parliament
- Parliament of Ireland
- Long title: An Act for cleansing the port, harbour, and river of Dublin, and for erecting a ballast-office in the said city.
- Citation: 6 Anne c. 20 (I)

Dates
- Royal assent: 24 October 1707
Other legislation
Repealed by	Dublin Port Act 1786

Status: Repealed

The year 1707 also witnessed the passing of the Dublin Port and Ballast Office Act 1707 (6 Anne c. 20 (I)), "An Act for Cleansing the Port, Harbour, and River of Dublin and for Erecting a Ballast Office in the said city" which witnessed the initiation of the Ballast Office – the first municipal authority in Dublin to take control of the port. The key functions of the Ballast Office were the imposition of port charges and the maintenance of the navigation channel, the latter of which had been a perennial problem. Luke Gardiner acted as the first secretary of the office.

=== Great South Wall ===
In 1715, work began on constructing the Great South Wall to shelter the entrance to the port. Poolbeg Lighthouse at the end of the South Bull Wall was constructed in 1767. The wall was finally completed in 1795 measuring 5 km. This protected the port from the shifting sands of Dublin Bay.

After James Gandon's Custom House was built further downstream in 1791, the port moved further towards the north bank of the river estuary.

=== Bull Wall ===
In 1800, a three-month survey of Dublin Bay conducted by Captain William Bligh recommended the construction of the Bull Wall. After the completion of the wall in 1825, North Bull Island slowly formed as sand built up behind it.

Nautical chart of Dublin Port in 1951

=== Containerisation ===
The advent of containerisation in the second half of the 20th century resulted in the port gradually moving a mile further downstream to enable new wharves with deeper water to be constructed.

== Future ==
A masterplan covering up to 2040 was published by the Dublin Port Company in 2012, setting out how it might improve capacity at the port and a commitment not to expand the port into Dublin Bay. Prior to the masterplan, over 40 years, the Dublin Port authorities had been exploring a controversial proposal to in-fill 21 hectares (52 acres) of Dublin Bay. The proposed development of Dublin Port, which would have increased its capacity by 50 per cent, was rejected by Bord Pleanála in June 2010.

Panorama image showing Dublin Port in the evening

== Services ==
The main activity of the port is freight handling, with a wide range of vessels, from large container carriers to small diesel lighters, visiting daily.

Roll-on/roll-off passenger ferry services run regularly across the Irish Sea to Holyhead in Wales, and in the summer months and at Christmas to Douglas, Isle of Man. Services also go to Cherbourg, France. The largest car ferry in the world, the Irish Ferries ship MV Ulysses (2000), which can carry up to 2000 passengers, runs on the Holyhead route. A new ship, MV W.B. Yeats, entered service in 2018 and is on the Cherbourg route. Another company, CLDN, operates 6 times a week to Rotterdam and Zeebrugge, and uses the latest "super ferries" in Europe: MV Celine and MV Delphine. These are the world's largest short-sea Ro-Ro vessels with 8 km of road space on board. They do not take trucks on board, just the trailers.

Dublin Port is also increasingly a docking point for cruise liners. Celebrity Eclipse began to home port in Dublin on 29 April 2018, and the port authorities reported 158 cruise ship visits in 2019. A temporary facility, Terminal 7, was created between Promenade and Tolka Quay Road at Branch Road; entered from Promenade Road, this allows cruise guests to check-in and leave baggage. A shuttle service transports guests to Ocean Pier 33. A new baggage claim facility was added to Ocean Pier 33 for guests to use when disembarking.

== Aids to navigation and pilotage ==
The port has three lighthouses in the mouth of the Liffey, multiple other aids to navigation and operates a pilot service.

== Terminals and operators ==
There are eleven passenger, freight and border inspection terminals at Dublin Port, serving several operators.

=== Passenger ferry operators ===
Ferry Company	Destination	Terminal
Irish Ferries	Holyhead, Cherbourg	1
Isle of Man Steam Packet Company	Douglas, Isle of Man	1
Stena Line	Holyhead	2

=== Passenger ferries ===
Preceding station	Ferry	Following station
Terminus	Irish Ferries; Ferry	Holyhead
Terminus	Irish Ferries; Ferry	Cherbourg
Terminus	Irish Ferries high-speed catamaran (seasonal)	Holyhead
Terminus	Stena Line; Ferry	Holyhead
Terminus	Isle of Man Steam Packet Company; Ferry (seasonal)	Douglas

=== Freight operators ===
Ferry Company	Destination	Terminal
BG Freight Line	Antwerp, Belfast, Liverpool, Rotterdam	MTL
CMA CGM	Le Havre	MTL
Cobelfret	Rotterdam, Zeebrugge	CUCT
Eucon	Antwerp, Rotterdam, Rouen, Southampton	DFT
Samskip	Rotterdam, Zeebrugge	DFT
Seatruck Ferries	Liverpool, Heysham	5
Zim Integrated Shipping Services	Rotterdam	DFT

== Other activities ==
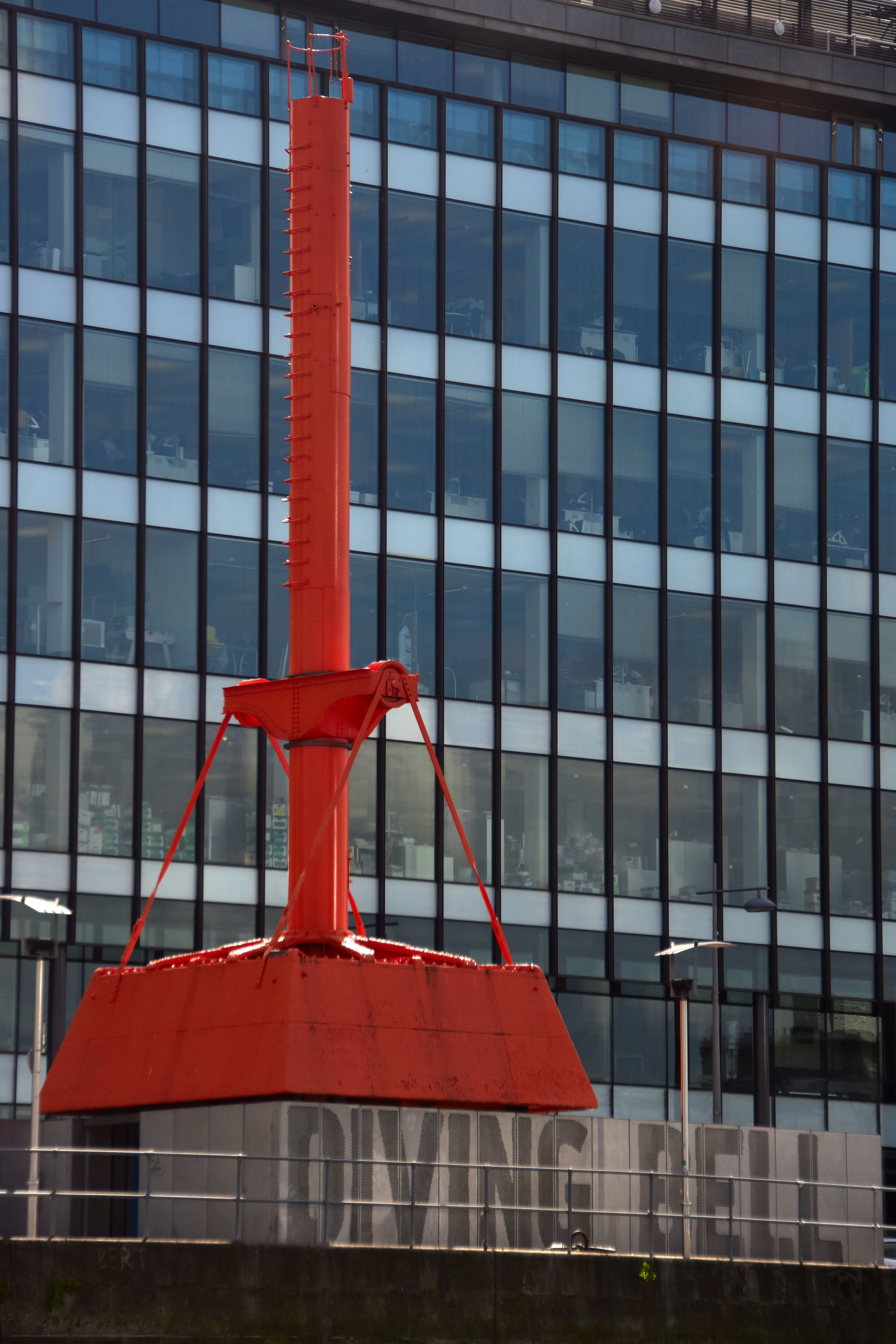
The Diving Bell, Sir John Rogerson's Quay

Within the main port enclave, on the north side of the river, are a power generating station (gas-fired), several oil terminals and a number of slightly-related businesses, and a Circle K petrol station on Bond Road. Entered at the north side of the port, but lying in East Wall, is one end of the Dublin Port Tunnel.

Since 2015 DPC has been involved in a series of heritage and community projects, including the Diving Bell Museum, the Tolka Greenway, the Maritime Garden, and the Pumphouse Heritage Zone. In 2020, the Liffey to Tolka Greenway, designed with Grafton Architects, was announced with support from the port company.

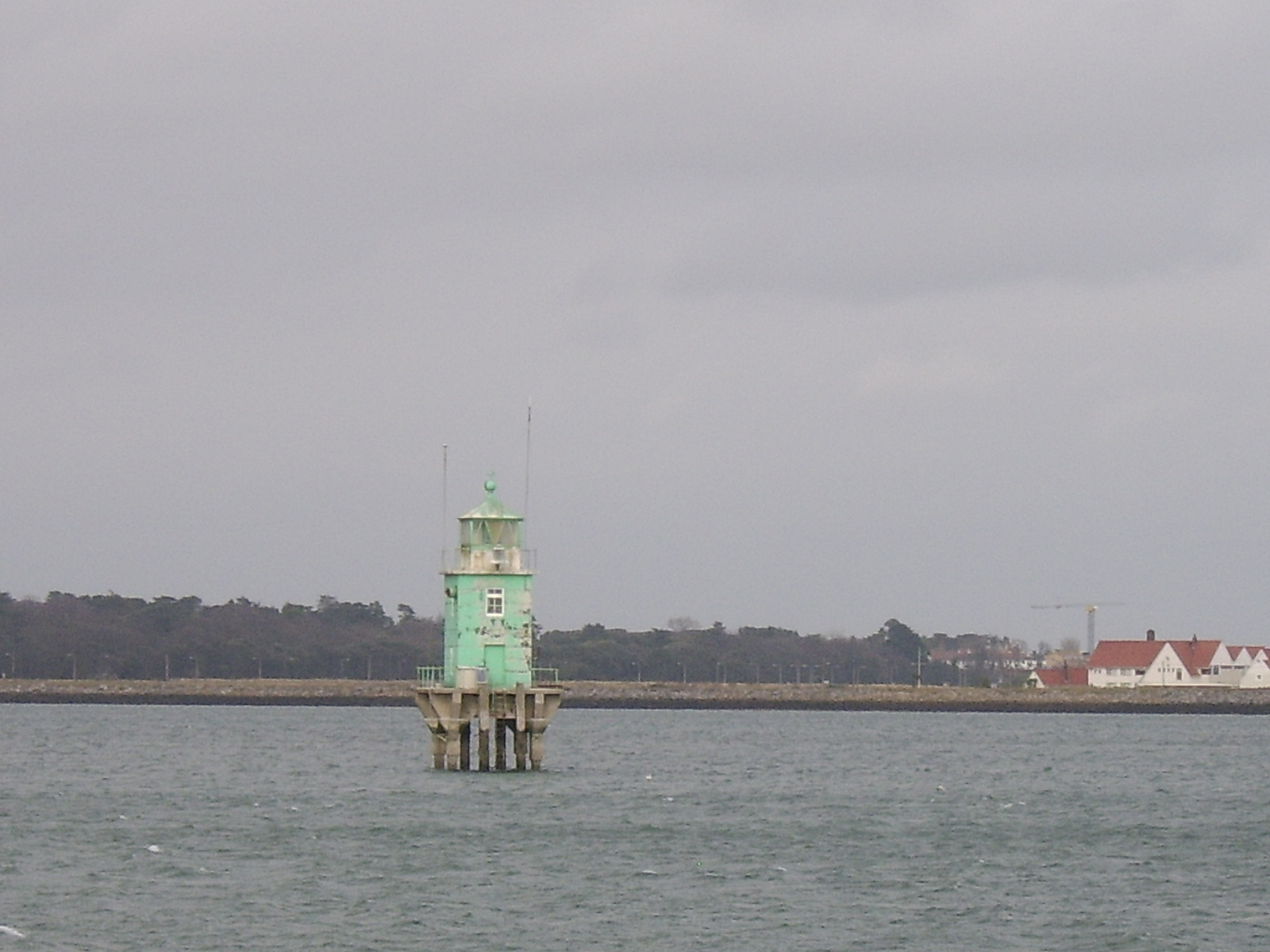
The central of three Liffey-mouth lighthouses

== Incidents ==
A number of workers have died whilst working at Dublin Port, including James Byrne (June 2018), Dennis Gomez (November 2018) and Matthew Grimes (May 2021).

== See also ==
- Dublin Port Tunnel
- Oil terminals in Ireland
