= Irish Continental Group =

Irish marine transportation group

- Formerly: Irish Continental Line
- Type: Public limited company
- Traded as: Euronext Dublin: IR5B; LSE: ICGC
- ISIN: IE00BLP58571
- Founded: 1972
- Headquarters: Dublin, Ireland
- Key people: John McGuckian (Chairman); Eamonn Rothwell (Chief Executive Officer)
- Services: Commercial and passenger transport. Ferry terminals, freight transport, ferry leasing and cargo vessels
- Revenue: €667 million (2025)
- Operating income: €151 million (2025)
- Net income: €86 million (2025)
- Number of employees: 293 (December 2025)
- Subsidiaries: Irish Ferries
- Website: www.icg.ie

Irish Continental Group is an Irish shipping and transport group. Operating roll-on/roll-off passenger, freight and container freight services on routes between Ireland, the United Kingdom and Continental Europe. Irish Continental Group also operates container terminals in Belfast and Dublin.

== History ==
House flag of Irish Continental Line (1973–1978)

House flag of Irish Continental Line (1978–1988)

Irish Continental Group (ICG) was formed as Irish Continental Line as an Irish/Scandinavian joint venture in 1972 in order to provide a direct ferry link from Ireland to Continental Europe.

In 1988 ICG was floated on the Irish Stock Exchange, followed in 1993 by a listing on the London Stock Exchange.

In 1992, ICG acquired the B&I Line from the Government of Ireland. This broadened its activities to include the short sea links with the United Kingdom, Ireland's largest trading partner, and also extended the group's operations into container transport and port operations.

In September 2026, ICG's shareholders accepted a takeover offer which will see it sold in a management buyout led by Chief Executive Officer Eamonn Rothwell. The transaction is subject to court approval.

== Divisions ==
- Belfast Container Terminal
- Dublin Ferryport Terminals
- Eucon
- Irish Ferries
