= Dorothy Braxton =

New Zealand journalist

Dorothy Pearl Braxton AM (née Mason; 1 August 1927 – 3 September 2014) was the first female journalist from New Zealand to visit Antarctica. In February 1968, she travelled on the Magga Dan to the Ross Sea. She was also among the first women to visit Cape Hallett. She wrote a book, The abominable snow-women, about her trip.

== Early life and education ==
Dorothy Braxton was born in Dunedin. The family moved to Bluff when her father, D. E. S. Mason, was appointed chief engineer of the Bluff Harbour Board.

She wrote stories from an early age and at six years old, had her first piece accepted by the children’s editor of the Otago Daily Times. Later, she attended Southland Girls' High School in Invercargill and Columba College in Dunedin. At Southland Girls’ High School, she started a student-led newspaper. This was during wartime when paper was in short supply, but Dorothy managed to persuade the Southland Daily News to donate the newsprint from their allocation.

At high school, Dorothy was told by the careers advisers that it was too hard for a girl to break into the male-dominated world of journalism. Despite this, she was accepted as a cadet reporter at The Southland Times. She later worked for the Southland News and the Christchurch Star and edited the New Zealand Home Journal magazine. In May 1965, she represented New Zealand at the first Asian-American Women Journalists’ Conference in Honolulu.

In 1948, she married John Braxton, a fellow journalist, and they had two children, Barrie and Barbara.

She had two grandchildren, Shane and Mitchell, both of whom were present with their respective parents when she was scattered in Bluff at her final resting place. She also had five great-grandchildren.

== Antarctica ==
Dorothy could remember scrambling around the rocks of Bluff Hill as a child, feeling “the wind blowing on my face straight from the South Pole” and imagining she was on the polar plateau "struggling with huskies and sledges". She said that “from the time I was old enough to realise that there was such a place as the Antarctic I had wanted to go there.”

She became a member of the New Zealand Antarctic Society in the 1960s and regularly sought to travel to the Antarctic. For ten years, she wrote annually to the Admiral in charge of the United States Naval Support Force, Antarctica, asking if she could have visiting privileges, but she was always turned down, often on the grounds that there were no facilities available for women. She also approached the Antarctic Division of the Department of Scientific and Industrial Research (DSIR) but was rebuffed there as well. Geoffrey W. Markham, the Superintendent, said, “Taking a woman down to Scott Base, where we haven’t facilities for them anyway, would be just like opening Pandora’s box. And I’m not going to be the first to turn the key.”

Later, she recalled how she had “battled officialdom, asking only that we women be granted the same privileges as our male counterparts were given and be permitted to go to the ice”. Finally, in February 1968, she found a way around “the petticoat ban on women journalists working in the Antarctic”, thanks to Lars-Eric Lindblad, who had organised two tourist cruises to the Ross Sea and offered her a berth on board the Magga Dan.

By now, Dorothy and her family were living in Christchurch and she was working for the New Zealand Woman’s Weekly. She regularly travelled around the South Island for her job, so the family was used to managing in her absence. Around this time Barbara, a teenager, was on a bus when she overheard two women talking about how “that Dorothy Braxton” was “going away again on another trip. This time to the Antarctic.” Her companion responded, “Those poor helpless children of hers. How a mother can just go away and leave a family to fend for themselves like that…”

Dorothy sailed on the second cruise, a month after Marie Darby (who sailed on both cruises) had become the first New Zealand woman to visit the Antarctic mainland. On this second trip, the Magga Dan with staff and 17 passengers on board sailed south via the Auckland Islands and Campbell Island; it visited the US bases at Cape Hallett and McMurdo Sound and New Zealand’s Scott Base. Dorothy noted in her book that "Our boots implanted the first feminine footprints at Cape Hallett and the first in Victoria Land on the mainland of Antarctica" and she was especially proud that "a New Zealand name headed the list of feminine signatures" at the US base there. A highlight was the visit to Scott Base, described by Lars-Eric Lindblad as "the nicest place in all Antarctica". On the return trip, the Magga Dan passed by the Balleny Islands and called in at Macquarie Island.

Dorothy Braxton later wrote about the trip in her book The abominable snow-women. A reviewer called it “a very readable book for those who would like to see the Antarctic through a woman's eyes” and added that “most women readers in particular would find it interesting.”

== Later work and career ==
The Braxton family lived in the Territory of Papua and New Guinea (now Papua New Guinea) in the early 1970s. Dorothy continued to work as a journalist in Australia and in 1991, she travelled to the Arctic, fulfilling a long-held desire to “go north and reach as close to 77° 52' north as I could get to match the 77° 52' south I had achieved on the voyage south on the Magga Dan” and to find out “how the Arctic differed from the Antarctic and what were the similarities.” She wrote about her trip in The Canberra Times, concluding that “both ends of the world are wild, remote and beautiful. Let us hope it stays that way.”

In 1998, she co-founded the Australian U3A Online Australia with Jack McDonell and Rick Swindell. In March 2011, she was granted an Honorary Life Membership in recognition of her work in establishing U3A Online.

== Legacy ==
Dorothy Braxton was awarded the Centenary Medal and made a Member of the Order of Australia (AM) for services to adult education in 2001. She died in Australia on 3 September 2014, aged 87. A year after her death, three generations of her family travelled to Bluff to scatter her ashes at Stirling Point and to plant some trees in her memory at the Bluff Maritime Museum.
