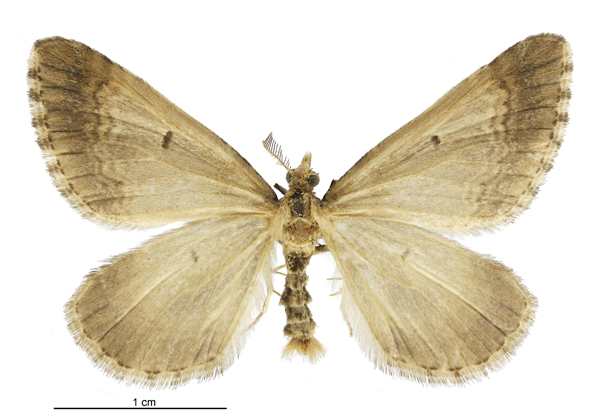
- Male

Conservation status
- Nationally Critical (NZ TCS)

Scientific classification
- Kingdom: Animalia
- Phylum: Arthropoda
- Clade: Pancrustacea
- Class: Insecta
- Order: Lepidoptera
- Family: Geometridae
- Genus: Asaphodes
- Species: A. frivola

Binomial name
- Asaphodes frivola (Meyrick, 1913)

Synonyms
- Xanthorhoe frivola Meyrick, 1913

= Asaphodes frivola =

Species of moth endemic to New Zealand

Asaphodes frivola, also known as the remuremu looper moth or Foveaux looper moth, is a species of moth in the family Geometridae with flightless females. It is endemic to New Zealand, and critically endangered, occurring in a very narrow and specialised habitat at just two small coastal sites near Invercargill. In 2025 this species was classified as "nationally critical" under the New Zealand Threat Classification System.

== Description ==
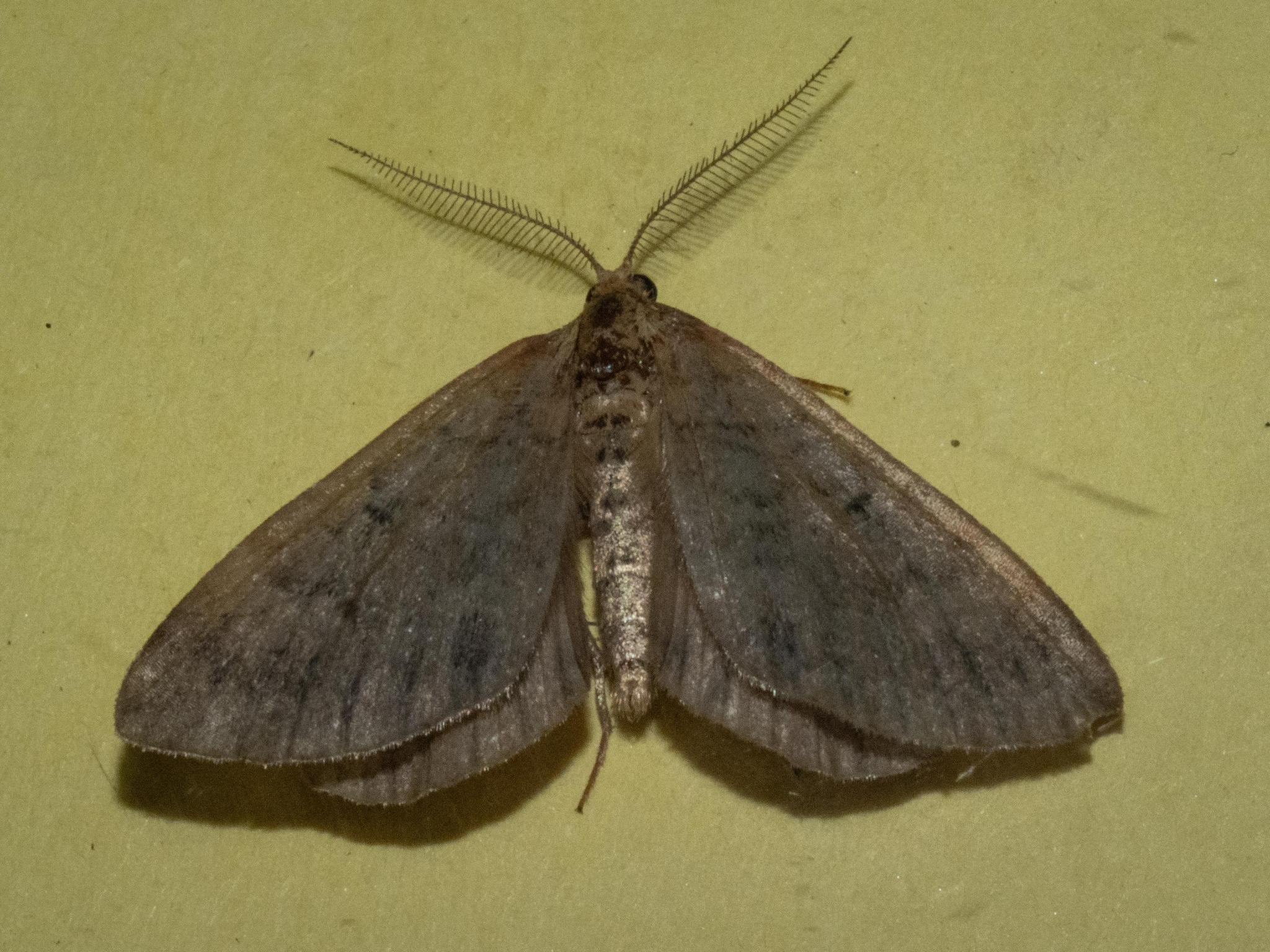
Living male A. frivola.

Asaphodes frivola is a small straw-coloured moth with a wingspan of nearly 30 mm. Only the males can fly; females have twisted, useless wings but have long legs and are swift runners. Several other New Zealand moth species have flightless females; flightlessness allows females to carry more eggs, but severely limits the ability of the species to disperse to new home ranges.

Eggs are laid in autumn and hatch after a month. Larvae are a dull greenish-grey with pink tinges, developing a herringbone pattern on their back as they slowly grow to 20 mm long. They likely pupate after nine months, but this has not yet been observed. Adult A. frivola emerge between mid March and mid April and are active on warm nights. Males are easily disturbed in the daytime and will fly short distances before resettling.

== Taxonomy and nomenclature ==
A. frivola was first described by Edward Meyrick in 1913 under the name Xanthorhoe frivola, from a single male specimen collected "in swampy forest near Invercargill" in 1912 by Alfred Philpott and sent to the British Museum, where it remains today. Philpott later noted when listing the moth species of Otago that "The type specimen is said to have been taken at Invercargill by myself, but I am quite unable to identify the species." Hudson mentioned X. frivola in his 1928 Butterflies and Moths of New Zealand, but did not have access to the holotype so did not illustrate it. Dugdale later determined this species was actually a member of the genus Asaphodes.

After the collection of a single specimen in 1912 this moth were not seen again for almost 70 years. On 19 March 1981 lepidopterist Brian Patrick was collecting Asaphodes oraria at the Invercargill suburb of Otatara, and at Sandy Point just across the Ōreti River when he discovered the males and flightless females of what appeared to be a new Asaphodes species. They turned out to be A. frivola.

This species has no universally accepted common name in English or Māori, and is sometimes simply called "little brown moth", but it has been referred to as the Foveaux looper moth, after nearby Foveaux Strait, and the bonking grass moth or remuremu looper moth after its presumed host plant.

== Distribution and habitat ==
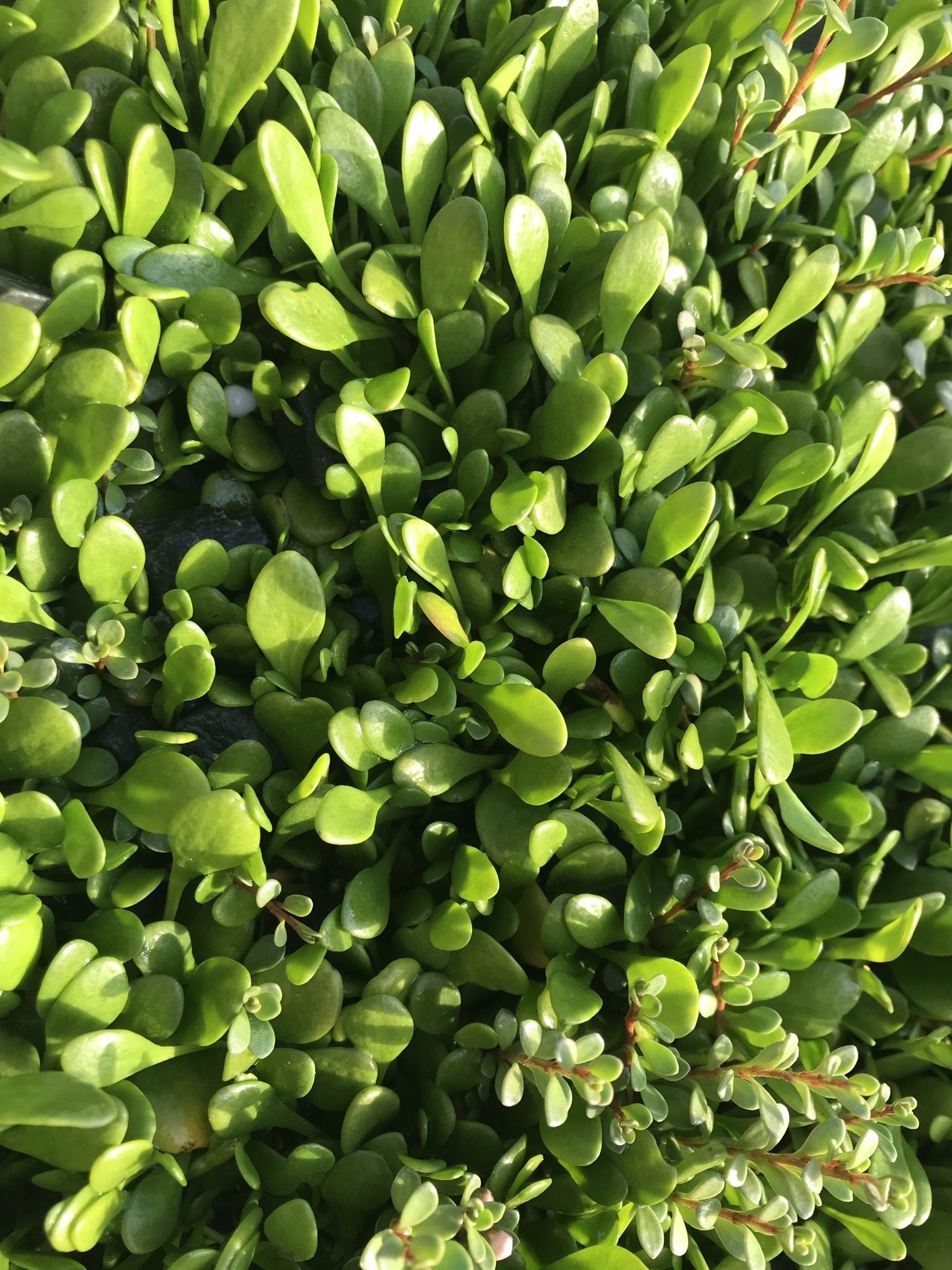
Goodenia radicans, probable larval host plant.

Philpott likely collected the holotype specimen at the New River Estuary, at the mouths of the Waihopai and Ōreti Rivers, the same area where the Sandy Point population was discovered in 1981. In 1984 a second population was found at Tiwai Point near Bluff, and 10 males and 5 females were collected there in a 2011 survey. On 18 April 2013 a third population was discovered by Department of Conservation entomologist Eric Edwards at the Three Sisters Sand Dune, on the southern side of the New River Estuary between Bluff and Omaui. A 2014 survey could no longer find A. frivola at Sandy Point; it seems to have disappeared from a combination of human disturbance (off-road 4WD vehicles have badly damaged the site) and the replacement of native vegetation with exotic weeds. The world population therefore appears to be confined to Tiwai Point and Three Sisters. As of 2014, only 34 males and 6 females of this species had ever been found.

A. frivola only occurs along a small area of the Southland coast, in a narrow (30–50 cm) and fragmented strip of short tussock grassland right next to shell or gravel beaches. The dominant plants in this habitat are knobby club rush (Ficinia nodosa) and silver tussock (Poa cita). After a 2014 survey, Brian Patrick and botanist Brian Rance hypothesised that A. frivola's host plant was the coastal buttercup species Ranunculus glabrifolius, based on observed feeding damage on the leaves; Ranunculus species are popular hosts for the genus Asaphodes. Subsequent surveys suggest the host is more likely to be the succulent creeping herb Goodenia radicans, known as remuremu or bonking grass.

== Conservation ==
A. frivola is at high risk of extinction, and has already disappeared from one of its three known localities. Its main population, at Tiwai Point, occupies less than 25 m^{2} of coastal vegetation, and the second population at Three Sisters Sand Dune is likely to be a similar size. Both sites are vulnerable to further fragmentation, off-road vehicles, road expansion, invasive weeds, and fire. Without management, A. frivola is predicted to go extinct within 10–30 years. The Department of Conservation gave it the threat ranking "Nationally Endangered" in 2012, which was increased in 2015 to "Nationally Critical". This "Nationally Critical" conservation status was again confirmed in 2025 with the qualification that this species is found in only one location.
