= Robin Morrison =

New Zealand photographer

- Morrison in 1992
- Born: 16 June 1944; Devonport, Auckland, New Zealand
- Died: 12 March 1993 (aged 48)
- Education: Massey University; Otago University
- Occupation: New Zealand photographer

Robin Morrison (16 June 1944 – 12 March 1993) was a New Zealand documentary photographer, best known for his unpretentious portrayal of New Zealand countryside, everyday life and quirky architecture. His photos can be described as unearthing memories of his childhood in the process of exploring the place as it is now.

His entire collection of negatives was gifted to the Auckland War Memorial Museum in 1992, which honoured his work in the exhibitions Robin Morrison, Photographer (1997), A Decade of Days (2013–2014) and Robin Morrison: Road Trip (2023).

== Early life ==
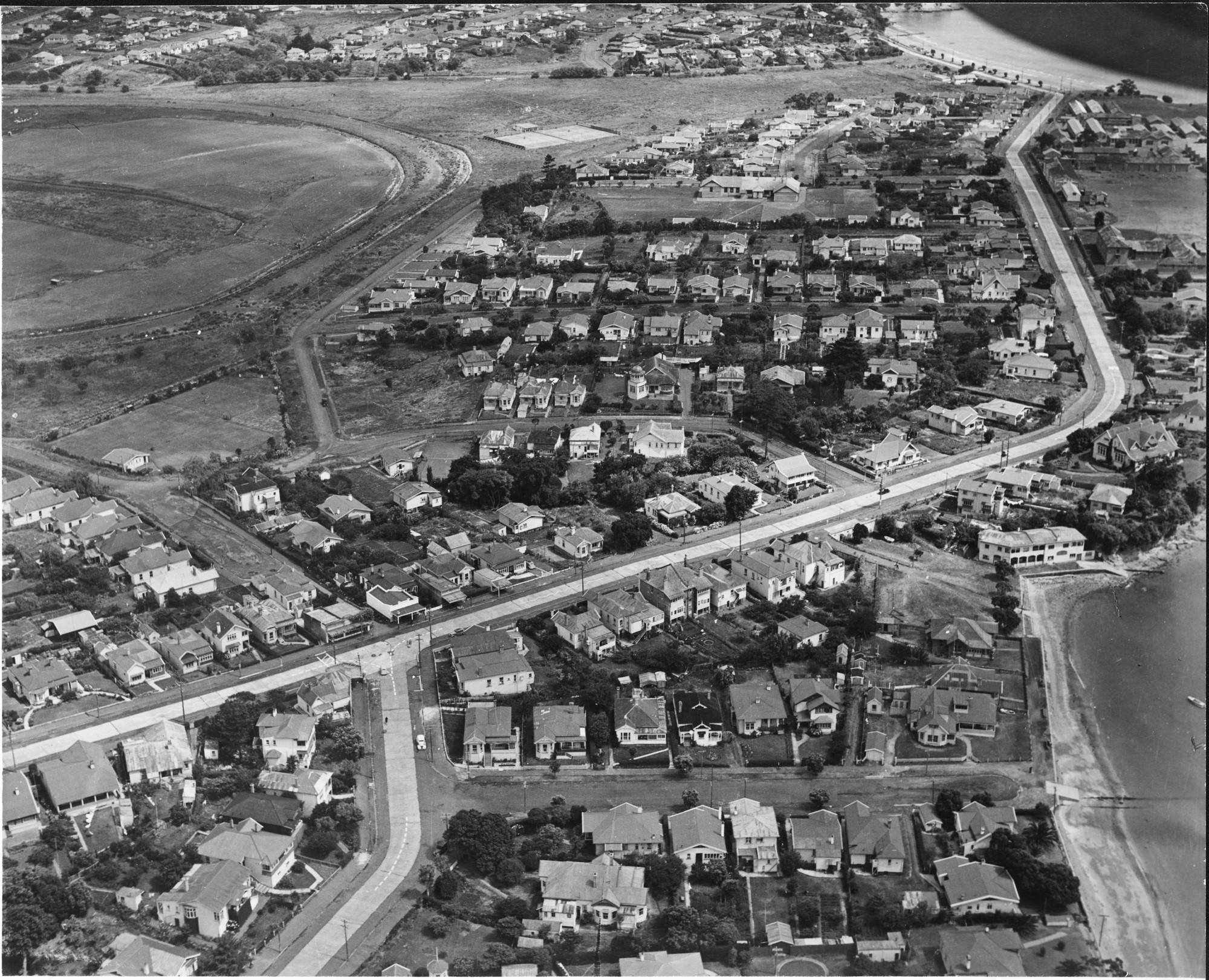
Narrow Neck on the North Shore of Auckland in 1944

Morrison was born in Devonport on the North Shore of Auckland on 16 June 1944. He grew up in Narrow Neck, and attended Vauxhall School. His family moved to Palmerston North when he was 10, where he attended Freyberg High School and Massey University. Morrison felt the need to escape Palmerston North, and moved to the South Island, attending Otago University in Dunedin, where he studied anthropology.

Morrison's father worked a home-portrait photographer for Christopher Bede Studios, however Morrison never took great interest in his works.

== Career ==
=== Origins and the New Zealand Listener ===
In 1965, Morrison moved to London, inspired by a "sense of urgency and claustrophobia" caused by 1960s counterculture. While working for the underground newspaper International Times in 1967, Morrison was asked to photograph an anti-Vietnam War demonstration, leading him to purchase his first camera, a second-hand Voigtländer. Even though the magazine did not use his shots, the experience of attending the demonstration and seeing the photographs develop grew Morrison's interest in photography.

Returning home to Auckland, Morrison became a freelance photographer for the New Zealand Listener. One of Morrison's first commissioned works was a greyscale photograph of Sir Edmund Hillary, which the Listener used as a cover. Morrison developed a passion for working on photojournalism stories, and in 1975 covered the diamond jubilee of the Gallipoli campaign, and visited Cromwell with journalist Louise Callan, covering the community's mixed protests and support for the Clyde Dam. In 1978, Morrison covered the Bastion Point protests, and created portrait shots for the Listener for people including Dame Whina Cooper, John A. Lee and Frank Sargeson.

In the mid-1970s, Morrison began producing calendars, including one of the shops of Ponsonby prior to gentrification, and returned to Cromwell to photograph the area before the construction of the Clyde Dam. Morrison persuaded Alister Taylor to fund Images of a House (1978), his first book that focuses on Tauroa Estate, a two-storey Modernist house constructed in 1916 by architect William Gummer.

=== From the Road ===
In the late 1970s, Morrison was commissioned by Air New Zealand to take promotional photographs of the South Island. While spending time in the South Island, Morrison was struck by how much of the South Island and its culture was never shown in traditionally seen photographs. In 1979, Morrison was awarded a grant from the Queen Elizabeth II Arts Council to produce colour photographs of people and places of the South Island, and had no strict plan of what he wanted to photograph.

In 1979, Morrison took his family on a seven-month South Island road trip, circling the island twice. He often left his family for weeks, during which they holidayed or attended local schools.

The collection received high interest from booksellers in the United Kingdom before release (originally intended for April 1980). In 1981, his works were published as The South Island of New Zealand: From the Road. The book was a major commercial success, and was the first photography collection to win a New Zealand Book Award in 1982.

Shots from From the Road were exhibited at the Auckland Art Gallery from June to August 1981, and a television documentary, From the Road - Robin Morrison: Photo Journalist (1981), profiled Morrison and his works.

Morrison photographed the Paua House in Bluff as a part of the book. The house's inclusion in From the Road helped to establish the house as a tourist attraction, and made the owners Fred and Myrtle Flutey local celebrities.

=== Later works ===
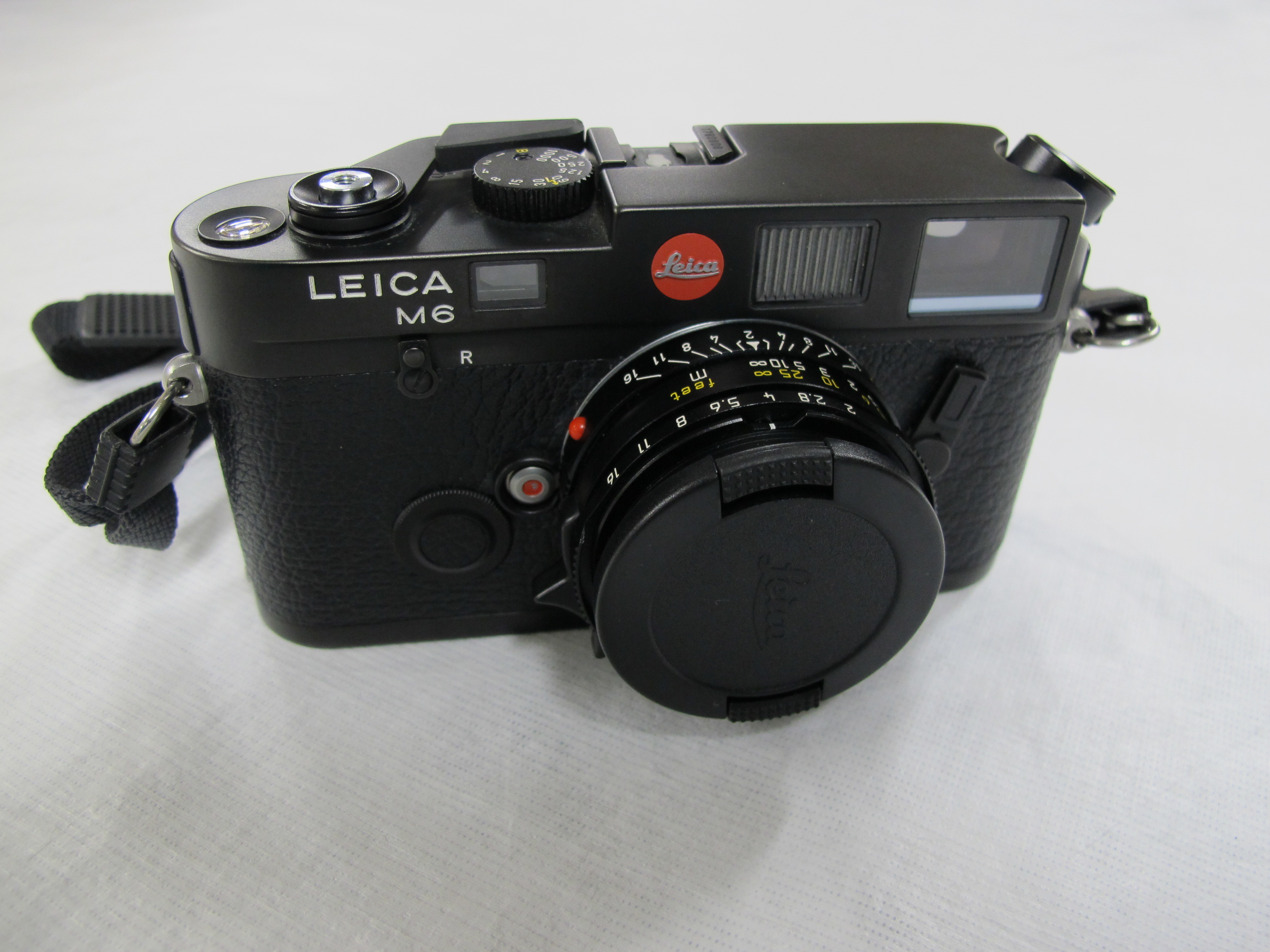
A Leica M6 owned by Morrison

In 1981, Morrison photographed the protests against the Springbok Tour. Morrison worked on a number of projects in the 1980s including, New Zealand vineyards, and historic locations in Europe. Morrison moved with his family to Sydney in 1983 for 18 months, during which he produced works photographing rural Australia.

After learning of a terminal cancer diagnosis, Morrison undertook his last major tour, photographing the Far North of New Zealand with Laurence Aberhart in October 1992. This was published posthumously as A Journey in 1994.

In 1992, Morrison donated his entire 100,000 photograph and negative collection to the Auckland War Memorial Museum. He died the following year on 12 March 1993.

== Legacy ==
In 1993, a television documentary, Sense of Place: Robin Morrison, Photographer, was released, featuring footage of Morrison shortly before his death. Sense of Place won Best Documentary at the 1994 Film & TV Awards, and a certificate of merit at the San Francisco International Film Festival.

The Auckland War Memorial Museum has held three exhibitions of Morrison's works. The first was Robin Morrison: Photographer, held from February to April 1997, after which the exhibition travelled across the country to Christchurch, Dunedin, Timaru, Wellington and Rotorua. The exhibition was paired with the release of a book, The Robin Morrison Collection. The second exhibition, A Decade of Days – Auckland Through Robin Morrison's Eyes (2013–2014), focused on Morrison's urban photography of Auckland in the 1970s and 1980s, and elements of the exhibition were installed at Manukau Institute of Technology and Ōtara Town Centre.

Robin Morrison: Road Trip, opened in March 2023, and was paired with a re-release of The South Island of New Zealand: From the Road.

In 2009, the Auckland City Council reissued Morrison's calendar of Ponsonby shot in 1978, as a part of the Auckland Heritage Festival.

== Personal life ==
Morrison met his wife Dinah Bradley while attending Otago University. The pair moved to London, where they wed in 1966. Robin and Dinah returned to New Zealand after Dinah became pregnant, having their first son Jake in 1970, followed by Keir in 1972. and bought a family home in Ponsonby in the same year.

== Selected books ==
- Images of a House (1978)
- The South Island of New Zealand: From the Road (1981)
- Reader's Digest Book of Historic Australian Towns (1982)
- A Sense of Place (1984)
- Wild Australia Reader's Digest (1984)
- The Wines and Vineyards of New Zealand (1984) text Michael Cooper
- The Historic Country Hotels of England (1985) text Wendy Arnold
- The Historic Hotels of London (1986) text Wendy Arnold
- The Irish Village (1986) with Christopher Fitz-Simon
- Homeplaces (1986) with Keri Hulme
- The English Country Town (1987) text Anthony Quiney
- The Historic Hotels of France (1988) text Wendy Arnold
- Auckland: City & Sea (1989)
- The Bayswater Brasserie Book of Food (1989)
- The Historic Hotels of Ireland (1989) text by Wendy Arnold
- A Land Apart: The Chatham Islands of New Zealand (1990) with Michael King
- The Historic Hotels of Paris (1990) text Wendy Arnold
- The Historic Hotels of Spain (1991) text Wendy Arnold
- New Zealand Architecture From Polynesian Beginnings to 1990 (1991) text Peter Shaw
- At Home and Abroad (1991)
- Sydney in Black and White (1992) text Glenn A Baker
- Coromandel (1993) with Michael King
- A Journey (1994)
