= Marie Darby =

New Zealand marine biologist and teacher (1940–2019)

- Marie Darby at Scott Base in January 1968
- Born: Marion Marie Stringer Büchler; 2 August 1940; Wellington, New Zealand
- Died: 10 October 2019 (aged 79); Lower Hutt, New Zealand
- Education: BSc (Victoria University of Wellington); MSc (University of Canterbury)
- Known for: First New Zealand woman to visit the Antarctic mainland
- Spouse: John Darby (sep. 1987)
- Scientific career
- Fields: Marine biology

Marion Marie Stringer Büchler (Marie Darby), 2 August 1940 – 10 October 2019) was a New Zealand marine biologist and teacher. She was the first New Zealand woman to visit the Antarctic mainland. In January 1968, she travelled on the Magga Dan, the first tourist vessel to the Ross Sea, and visited Scott Base with other staff and tourists. She prepared a checklist of sub-Antarctic birds for the information of tourists on board and later wrote an article on summer seabirds to be seen between New Zealand and McMurdo Sound. Mt Darby in Antarctica is named after her.

== Biography ==
Marie Büchler was born in Wellington on 2 August 1940, the daughter of Marie Payne Büchler (née Stringer), a general practitioner, and Arthur William Büchler. Her interest in the sub-Antarctic and Antarctic began at a young age, when her mother used to take her down to the wharf to watch boats returning from the sub-Antarctic. Marie and her mother also went together to talks given by Dominion Museum director Robert Falla about penguin and seals.

Büchler was educated at Hutt Valley High School, and then studied at Victoria University of Wellington, where she graduated with a BSc. She completed an honours and a master's degree at the University of Canterbury, specialising in ichthyology. Her 1966 master's thesis was entitled The ecology of fishes in tidal rockpools: with a revision of the common littoral species Tripterygion nigripenne Cuv., and Val., 1836 (Tripterygiidae: Blennioidei: Teleostei). At the time of her trip south, she was working as a marine zoologist at Canterbury Museum, but she had spent a year at the Portobello marine biological station in Dunedin and had taken part in several study trips in Cook Strait. She was also an Honorary Ranger.

She married John Darby, a zoologist and biological photographer for the University of Canterbury. John Darby was working at the penguin colony at Cape Bird, 60 miles north of Scott Base, from December 1967 to February 1968, so he was already in Antarctica when Marie arrived.

She died on 10 October 2019, aged 79 years, at Te Omanga Hospice in Lower Hutt.

== Antarctica ==
In 1968, the first tourists travelled to the Ross Sea on the Magga Dan. Most of the tourists on the first cruise had flown to New Zealand from the United States. Büchler prepared a checklist of sub-Antarctic birds for the information of tourists on board, and later wrote an article on summer seabirds to be seen between New Zealand and McMurdo Sound. They arrived in Auckland on 4 January 1968 and sailed from Lyttelton on 8 January, calling in at the Chatham Islands on the way south. The Magga Dan ran aground on 22 January near Hut Point at the entrance to Winter Quarters Bay in McMurdo Sound. She was successfully re-floated and returned to Bluff on 2 February. The second cruise left from Bluff on 6 February and reached Winter Quarters Bay on 19 February.

One "major novelty" that the voyage brought to Antarctica was "femininity". Twelve of the first group of 25 tourists were women. Before this, the only women to have visited the Ross Dependency were two American air hostesses on a Pan American flight from Christchurch to McMurdo Sound who spent about three hours on the ground on 15–16 October 1957. Dorothy Braxton, a New Zealand journalist who managed to travel on the second sailing of the Magga Dan, described this exclusion as "the petticoat ban imposed on women who wanted to reach these regions."

Büchler was on board the Magga Dan for both trips as a lecturer employed by Lars Eric Lindblad, of Lindblad Travel Inc, New York, who had organised these two tourist cruises. She later recalled that the New Zealand and American governments were unenthusiastic about the tourism venture but that "the people at Scott Base were very, very helpful and extended their hospitality without prejudice". The leader of Scott Base, Mr W.J. Webb, gave permission for the tourists to pay a brief visit to the base, saying he was satisfied that "the party is sufficiently interested in our scientific projects to warrant approval of their requests". He said he "did not expect the presence of women to have any unsettling effects on the men", adding "it's my guess that some of the men will be a bit shy."

After the two expeditions, she wrote a paper on seabirds, noting that "During daylight hours, the writer kept as continuous a birdwatch as possible, and recorded sea and air temperatures and weather conditions." She recorded sightings of 12 species including petrel, wandering albatross, black-browed mollymawk and southern skua. At the end of the paper she "gratefully acknowledge[d] the help of the tourists and expedition staff of the 1968 Antarctic Tourist Expeditions to McMurdo Sound; and the endless assistance given by Capt. F. Bang, the Officers, particularly W. de Lange, and all the seamen on MS Magga Dan; during the long bird-watch and weather recording".

== Work and career ==
After returning from these two trips, Büchler taught in primary schools and also worked for the University of Canterbury and the University of Otago. Her later career included starting up a bilingual children's magazine, acting as a science advisor to primary schools and working in Steiner schools in New Zealand after training as a Rudolf Steiner teacher in Germany.

== Later Antarctic travels ==
Büchler carried out further trips as a lecturer with Lindblad Travels, including to the Antarctic Peninsula in 1991–92 on the Ocean Princess. In 1993–94, she travelled from Cape Town to the sub-Antarctic islands, the Antarctic Peninsula and the Ross Sea on board the Marco Polo.

=== Legacy ===
In 2004 the New Zealand Geographic Board named an Antarctic mountain after Büchler: Mount Darby.

== See also ==
- Women in Antarctica
