= Dorothy May De Lany =

New Zealand hotel worker and trade unionist

Dorothy May De Lany (24 March 1908–19 October 1970) was a New Zealand hotel worker and trade unionist. She was born in Bluff, Southland, New Zealand on 24 March 1908. In 1963 she was elected president of the New Zealand Federated Hotel, Hospital, Restaurant and Related Trades Employees’ Association, which represented over 24,000 workers.
