= Eddie Robinson (rugby union) =

New Zealand rugby union player

- Born: Charles Edward Robinson; 5 April 1927 Bluff, New Zealand
- Died: 4 March 1983 (aged 55) Bluff, New Zealand
- Height: 1.83 m (6 ft 0 in)
- Weight: 83 kg (183 lb)

Rugby union career
- Position: Flanker
Provincial / State sides
Years	Team	Apps	(Points)
1948–1955	Southland	56	
International career
Years	Team	Apps	(Points)
1951–1952	New Zealand	5	(3)

Charles Edward Robinson (5 April 1927 – 4 March 1983) was a New Zealand rugby union player. A flanker, Robinson represented Southland at a provincial level, and was a member of the New Zealand national side, the All Blacks, in 1951 and 1952. He played 11 matches for the All Blacks including five internationals.
