= Stuart Park (museum director) =

New Zealand museum professional

- Born: Graham Stuart Park; 21 August 1947 (age 78); Croydon, Surrey, England
- Other names: G. Stuart Park, G. S. Park
- Education: University of Otago
- Occupations: Museum director; anthropologist
- Scientific career
- Thesis: The classification of prehistoric stone implements by factor analysis : a consideration of New Zealand stone adzes. (1972)

Graham Stuart Park (born 21 August 1947) is a New Zealand anthropologist and museum director. He was the anthropologist at Otago Museum from 1965 to 1979, and the director of Auckland War Memorial Museum from 1979 to 1993. Park was among the team of creative directors who developed Te Papa, the national museum of New Zealand in Wellington.

== Early life ==
Park was born in Croydon, Surrey, England on 21 August 1947, the son of Douglas Robert Park and Doreen Ledlie Stuart. His father, originally from Dunedin, served in the Fleet Air Arm of the Royal Navy, and the Royal New Zealand Naval Volunteer Reserve during World War II.

Park attended North Sydney Boys High School and at age 15 arrived in New Zealand, where he attended Otago Boys' High School. After high school, Park studied at the University of Otago, receiving a Bachelor of Arts degree in 1968 and a Master of Arts with honours in 1972.

== Career ==
Park was employed as the anthropologist at Otago Museum in 1968, where he stayed for 11 years. During this time, he worked on excavating archaeological sites at Tiwai Point, before the construction of the Tiwai Point Aluminium Smelter. He left the Otago Museum in 1979 after 12 years to become the director of the Auckland War Memorial Museum, becoming one of the youngest museum directors in New Zealand, at 32.

While at the Auckland War Memorial Museum, Park took a keen interest in developing the museum volunteers programme, which began in December 1983. In addition to this, Park had interests in ethnology, applied arts and museum studies, and instigated the first Auckland Museum newsletters. After an incident when TVNZ reused old footage taken at the museum of culturally sensitive items against his wishes, Park banned TVNZ from filming at the museum. He was a member of the organising committee for the international exhibition Te Maori, which toured the United States and New Zealand from 1984 to 1987.

In 1990, Park was awarded the New Zealand 1990 Commemoration Medal.

In the early 1990s, Park worked to redevelop the first floor of the museum, including the Volcanoes & Giants exhibition and Weird & Wonderful, an exhibition space for tactile learning about the natural world.

He left Auckland War Memorial Museum in December 1993, becoming a concept leader for Te Papa in Wellington from 1993 until 1998. Park, as a member of the concept leader team, was tasked with conceiving ideas for opening exhibits at Te Papa for its opening in 1998, as well as developing the museum's collections. After the museum opened, Park became the director of museum resources from 1998 to 1999. In October 1999, Park moved to Kerikeri, where he became the Northland area manager for the New Zealand Historic Places Trust. During this period, Park worked on creating a central database for information on Northland war memorials.

Park retired on 31 August 2012, after which he dedicated much of his time to developing a personal collection of glasswork, which was exhibited at the New Zealand Glassworks facility in Whanganui in 2022. In 2016, Park wrote the content for Path to Nationhood, an app created by Heritage New Zealand that offers audio tours of different historic areas around Northland.

== Honours ==
In 2018, Park became a Fellow of Auckland War Memorial Museum.

== Partial list of publications ==
- Park, G. S. (1969). "Tiwai Point: A preliminary report". New Zealand Archaeological Association Newsletter. 12: 143–146. Wikidata Q119374998.
- Park, G. S. (1971). "Chemical analysis in archaeology". New Zealand Archaeological Association Newsletter. 14 (4): 173–178. Wikidata Q119379397.
- Park, G. S. (1972). "Towards an overview of New Zealand prehistory". New Zealand Archaeological Association Newsletter. 15 (3): 105–112. Wikidata Q119379594.
- Park, G. S.; Sutton, D. G.; Ward, G. K. (1972). "Notes on the protection of archaeological sites and historic materials". New Zealand Archaeological Association Newsletter. 16: 5–13. Wikidata Q119374282.
- Park, G. S.; Sutton, D. G.; Ward, G. K. (1973). "Further notes on the conservation of antiquities". New Zealand Archaeological Association Newsletter. 16 (1): 22–24. Wikidata Q119379609.
- Green, R. C.; Park, G. S. (1976). "New Zealand prehistory: informing the public". New Zealand Archaeological Association Newsletter. 19 (4): 187–192. Wikidata Q119379626.
- Park, G. S. (1978). "Radiocarbon dates from Tiwai Point, Southland". New Zealand Archaeological Association Newsletter. 21: 143–145. Wikidata Q119375355.
- Park, G.S. (1980). "Chinese Coins in New Zealand" (PDF). New Zealand Numismatic Journal. 15 (2): 55–61. Wikidata Q119426355.
- Park, Stuart (1983). "New Zealand Commercial Ceramics" (PDF). AGMANZ News. 14 (3): 2–3. Wikidata Q119379689.
- Park, Stuart (1985). "Deaccessioning" (PDF). AGMANZ News. 16 (3): 12–14. Wikidata Q119379725.
- Park, Stuart (1986), An introduction to Auckland Museum, Illustrator: Brian Brake, Raymond Lau, Wikidata Q119369099
- Park, Stuart (1989). "The Pacific Stone Adze Studies of H.D. Skinner and Roger Duff: an Historical Survey". Saying So Doesn’t Make It So – Papers in Honour of B. Foss Leach: 35–63. Wikidata Q119375315.
- Park, Stuart (1992). "Te Peeke o Aotearoa: The Bank of King Tawhiao". New Zealand Journal of History. 26 (2): 161–183. ISSN 0028-8322. Wikidata Q119378260.
- Park, Stuart (1998). "John Alexander Smith and the Early History of Auckland Museum, 1852-1867". Papahou: Records of the Auckland Museum. 35: 13–43. ISSN 1174-9202. JSTOR 42905832. Wikidata Q58623224.
- Park, Stuart (2004). "A future for our past?". Archaeology in New Zealand. 47 (4): 185–188. Wikidata Q119375077.
