= Paua House =

Display at the Canterbury Museum in Christchurch, New Zealand

Coordinates: 46°36′05″S 168°21′00″E

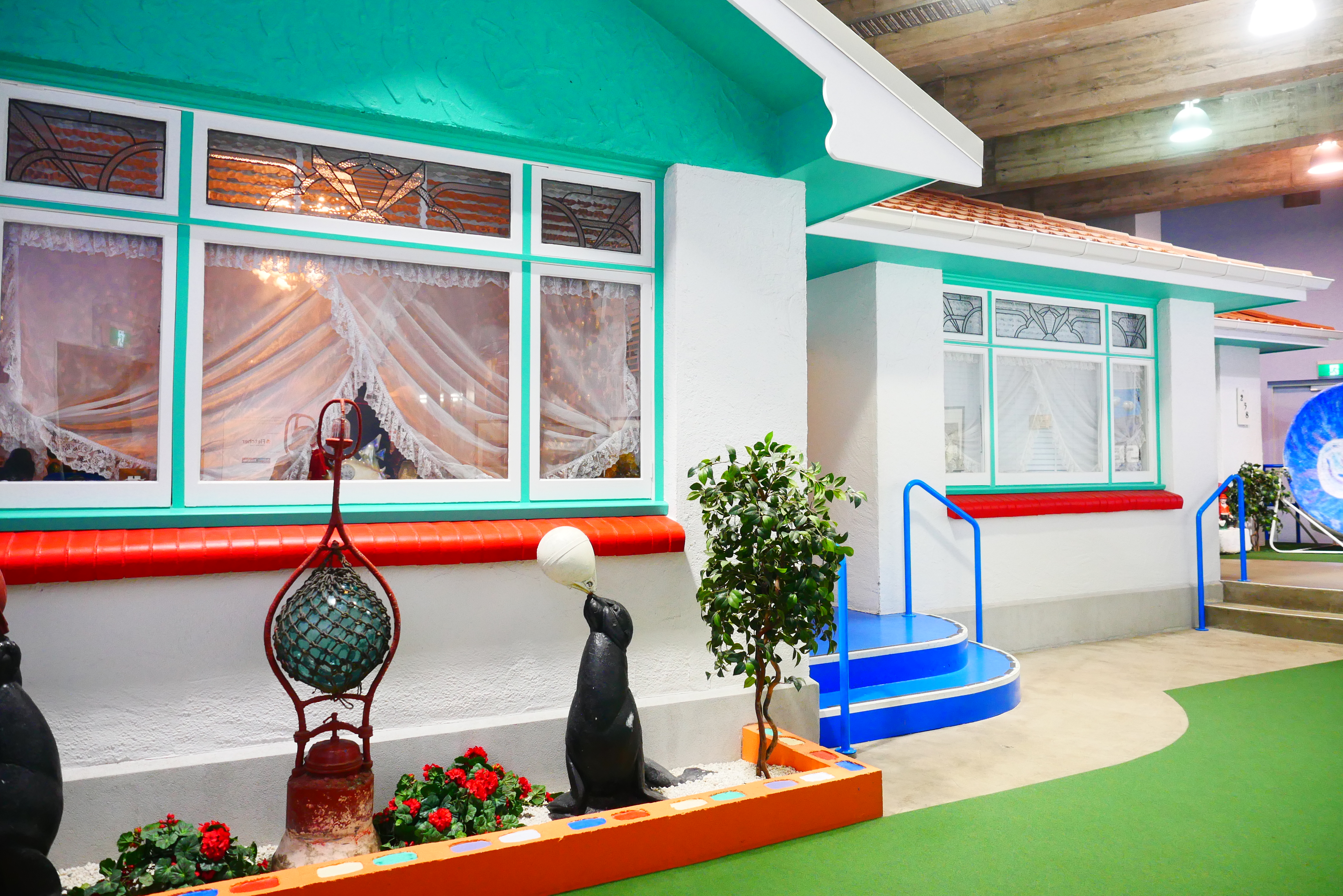
Exterior of Paua Shell house, taken 2019

The Paua House was a tourist attraction in the southern New Zealand town of Bluff, but now on display at the Canterbury Museum in Christchurch.

== History ==
The Paua House was originally just a standard New Zealand bungalow located at 258 Marine Parade, Bluff. The house was owned by elderly couple Fred and Myrtle Flutey, who built up a massive collection of ornaments and trinkets made from the iridescent shells of the pāua, a New Zealand species of abalone often used for souvenirs and items of kitsch. Over the course of some 40 years, the couple adorned the house with these ornaments, and also with the cleaned shells of pāua found by the Fluteys on the local beach. By the time of the couple's deaths (Myrtle in 2000, Fred on New Year's Eve 2001) the walls of their lounge were covered with over 1,100 shells,

In 1979, New Zealand photographer Robin Morrison visited the house, and included it in his book The South Island of New Zealand From the Road (1981). The house's inclusion in the book helped establish the house as a tourist attraction, and made the owners Fred and Myrtle Flutey local celebrities. The Fluteys were playing host to thousands of visitors per year, with some reports suggesting one million people visited the house during the 37 years that the collection was built up.

When the Fluteys died, the house was purchased by their grandson, Ross Bowen. Despite protests from locals who wished the house to stay in its shelled condition, Bowen loaned the Fluteys' collection to Canterbury Museum in Christchurch on a ten-year loan. Parts of the house were recreated by the museum and opened to the public in 2008. It was seen by some quarter of a million museum visitors in its first two years on display.

== Virtual tour ==
The house can be viewed in an online virtual tour.

== Gallery ==
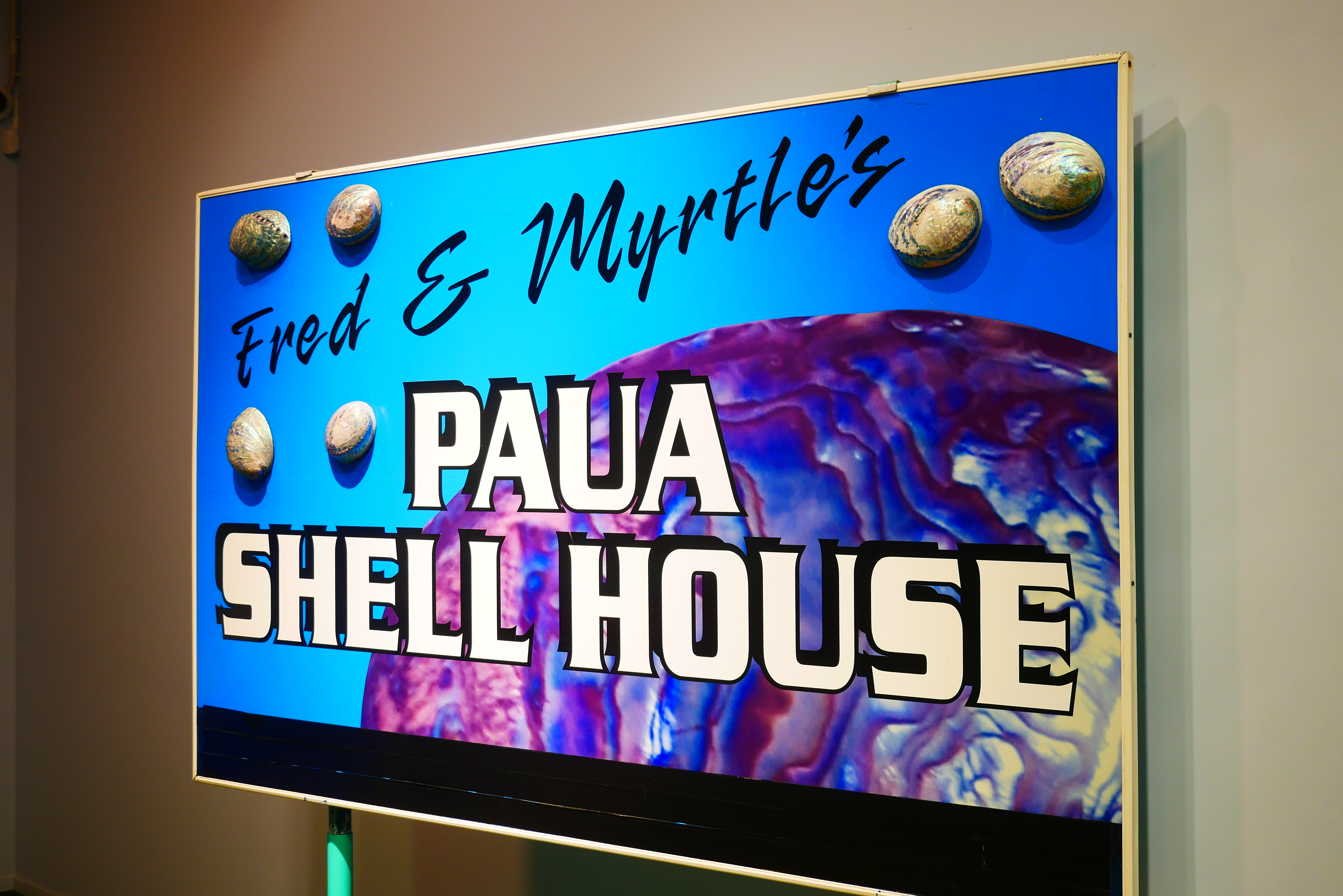
Paua Shell House Sign

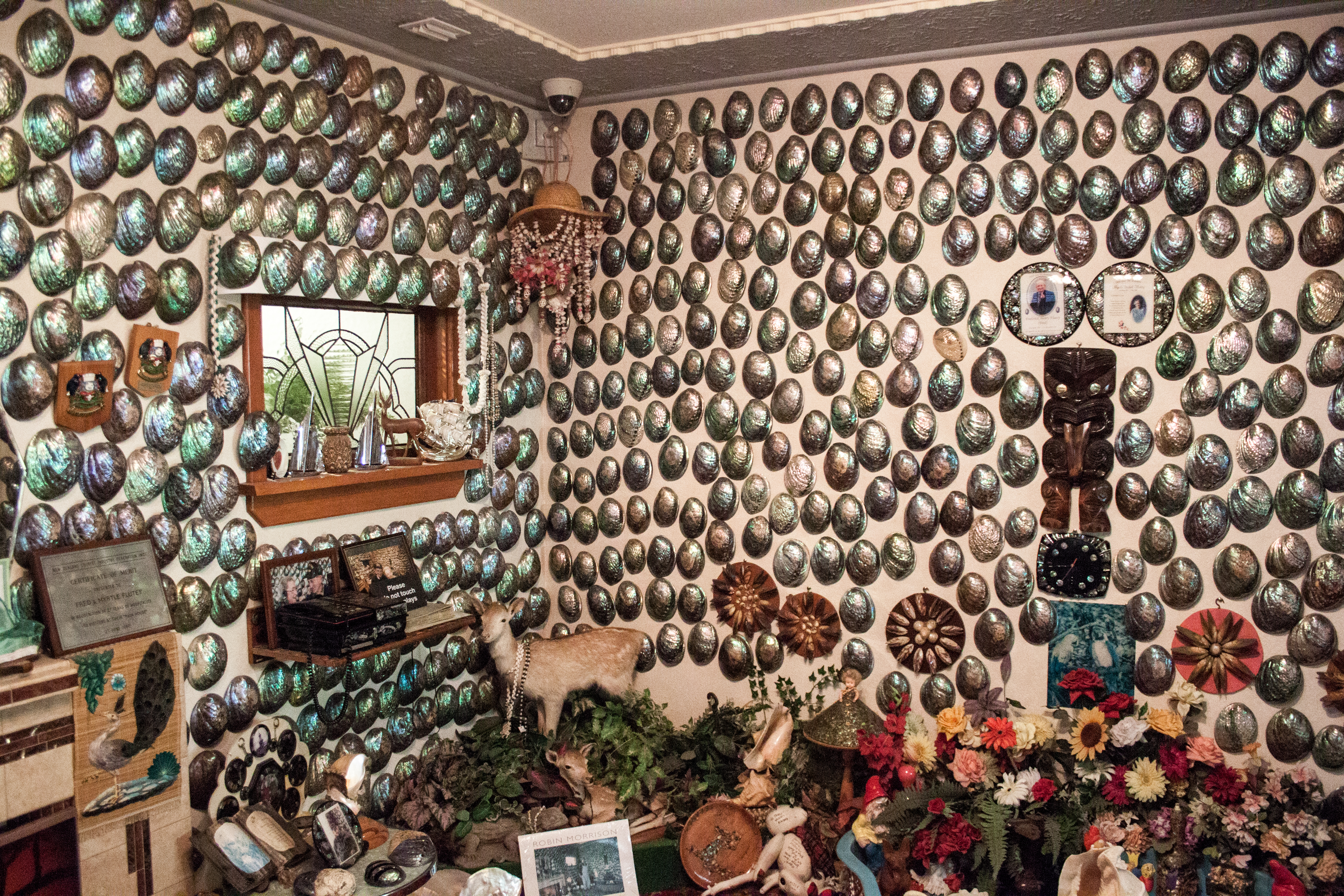
Walls covered with shells, interior Paua House taken 2016

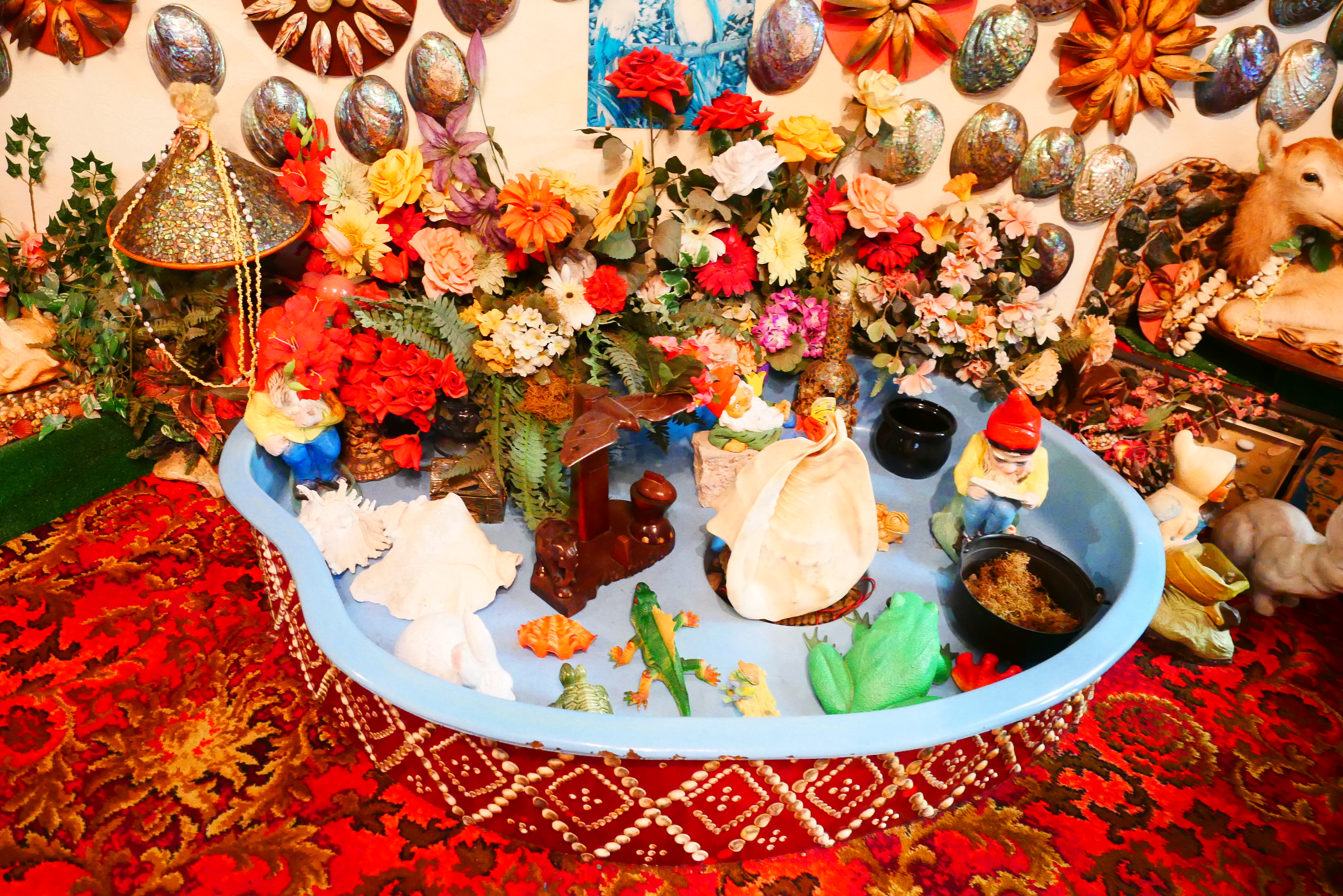
Pieces of the collection

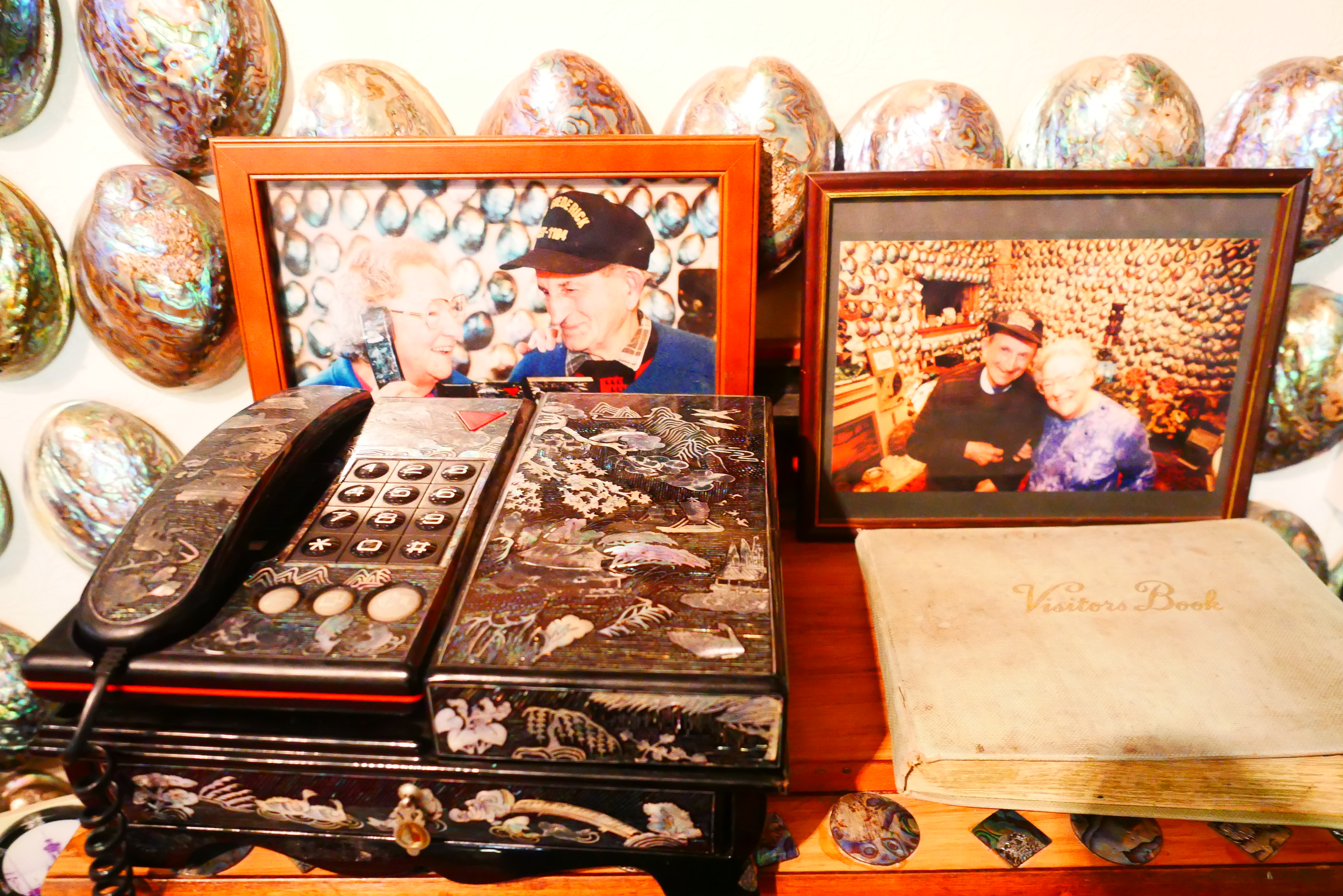
Visitor's Book
