= Ocean Beach, Bluff =

Ocean Beach
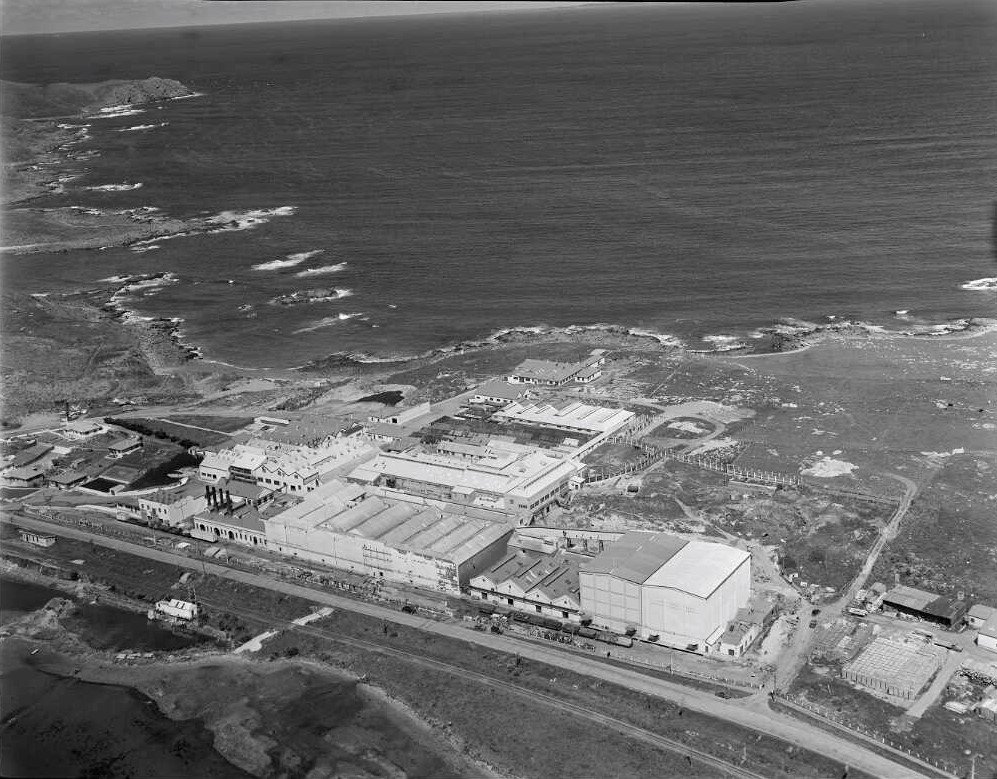
- Ocean Beach freezing works (1956)
- Interactive map of Ocean Beach
- Coordinates: 46.5913°S 168.3092°E
- Country: New Zealand
- Region: Southland Region

Ocean Beach is an industrial area in the Southland Region of New Zealand. For around 100 years it was the site of a freezing works. This closed in 1991, and the site has been redeveloped as an aquaculture facility.

== Setting ==
Ocean Beach is located 2 km (1.2 mi) from the centre of the town of Bluff on State Highway 1 on an isthmus of land between Bluff Harbour and Foveaux Strait. The Bluff Branch railway line runs parallel to State Highway 1 through the isthmus, and terminates at the port of Bluff —the southern–most point of the Kiwirail network.

== Freezing works ==
A freezing works was established on the site in 1892 and by 1901 it had a capability of processing 3000 sheep each day. The freezing works closed in 1991.

== Aquaculture facility ==
An aquaculture facility was developed from 2018 using a collection of buildings that were originally part of the freezing works. It has large tanks, and uses water from Foveaux Strait to raise popular New Zealand species including hāpuku, kingfish, whitebait and pāua.

== Flying boat service ==
Ocean Beach was used as flying boat alighting area. Controlled by the Bluff Harbour Board, it was used by the RNZAF for flying boat operations (until 1966) when patrolling New Zealand's southern sub-Antarctic islands. Short Sunderland and Consolidated Catalina aircraft types were regular visitors.

In the late 1950s, Ansett Australia operated four chartered international flights using Short Sandringham flying boats. A local launch, small jetty and customs terminal was provided and passengers hurried onto buses for the short ride to Invercargill. This was an early attempt to open the southern region to mass tourism.

Eventually the flying boat era was replaced by more efficient land based airliners and the alighting area delisted as an airport.

== See also ==
- Aquaculture in New Zealand
