= Tiwai Point =

Point in Southland, New Zealand

Coordinates: 46.598034°S 168.364105°E

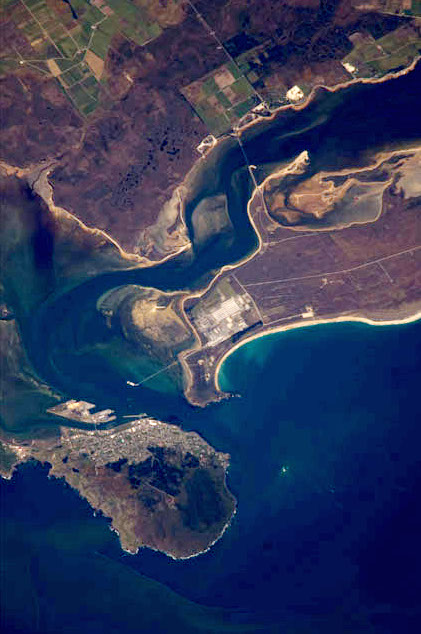
Awarua Plain (top), Tiwai Point (centre) and Bluff (lower left) viewed from the International Space Station in 2008

Tiwai Point lies at the entrance to Bluff Harbour on the southern coast of the South Island of New Zealand. A spit which extends from the western end of the Awarua Plain, it lies between Awarua Bay to the north and Foveaux Strait to the south. It is known for the Tiwai Point Aluminium Smelter, one of the largest industrial facilities in New Zealand.

== Demographics ==
Tiwai Point is part of the Woodend-Greenhills statistical area.

== Tiwai Rocks Important Bird Area ==
The rocks at the tip of Tiwai Point have been identified as an Important Bird Area by BirdLife International because they are home to a breeding colony of Foveaux shags.

== Foveaux looper moth ==
Tiwai Point is one of the two remaining locations where the critically endangered Foveaux looper moth lives. A. frivola is at high risk of extinction, and has already disappeared from one of its three known localities. Its main population exists on an area at Tiwai Point of less than 25 m^{2} of coastal vegetation.

== Archaeological site ==
In 1968 archaeological excavations were carried out before construction of the Tiwai Point Aluminium Smelter. Led by Stuart Park the excavation team came from the Otago Anthropological Society, the University of Otago Anthropology Department, the Southland Museum and Comalco. The site revealed Māori pre-European middens and evidence of extensive adze and tool manufacturing. Eleven tonnes of artefacts and material were retrieved from the 14th century site including adzes, hammer-stones and sinkers made from local argillite.

== Causeway accident ==
In 1980, a vehicle with 10 people failed to take a turn on the Tiwai Point causeway, crashing through a barrier and falling into the water. Seven people died, including five who were never recovered.

== Climate ==
Climate data for Tiwai Point (1991–2020 normals, extremes 1970–present)
Month	Jan	Feb	Mar	Apr	May	Jun	Jul	Aug	Sep	Oct	Nov	Dec	Year
Record high °C (°F)	30.2 (86.4)	32.1 (89.8)	28.9 (84.0)	24.2 (75.6)	21.9 (71.4)	21.9 (71.4)	20.2 (68.4)	20.0 (68.0)	23.8 (74.8)	23.7 (74.7)	27.9 (82.2)	29.0 (84.2)	32.1 (89.8)
Mean maximum °C (°F)	26.0 (78.8)	25.4 (77.7)	23.7 (74.7)	20.9 (69.6)	17.6 (63.7)	14.5 (58.1)	14.0 (57.2)	15.7 (60.3)	19.0 (66.2)	20.6 (69.1)	22.3 (72.1)	24.8 (76.6)	27.7 (81.9)
Mean daily maximum °C (°F)	18.0 (64.4)	18.0 (64.4)	16.8 (62.2)	14.8 (58.6)	12.5 (54.5)	10.3 (50.5)	9.9 (49.8)	11.0 (51.8)	12.7 (54.9)	13.8 (56.8)	15.1 (59.2)	17.0 (62.6)	14.2 (57.5)
Daily mean °C (°F)	14.5 (58.1)	14.5 (58.1)	13.2 (55.8)	11.3 (52.3)	9.2 (48.6)	7.1 (44.8)	6.4 (43.5)	7.4 (45.3)	9.0 (48.2)	10.3 (50.5)	11.6 (52.9)	13.4 (56.1)	10.7 (51.2)
Mean daily minimum °C (°F)	10.9 (51.6)	10.9 (51.6)	9.6 (49.3)	7.9 (46.2)	6.0 (42.8)	3.8 (38.8)	2.9 (37.2)	3.8 (38.8)	5.3 (41.5)	6.9 (44.4)	8.2 (46.8)	9.9 (49.8)	7.2 (44.9)
Mean minimum °C (°F)	6.1 (43.0)	6.0 (42.8)	4.5 (40.1)	2.4 (36.3)	0.6 (33.1)	−1.2 (29.8)	−2.1 (28.2)	−1.1 (30.0)	0.3 (32.5)	1.8 (35.2)	3.4 (38.1)	5.0 (41.0)	−2.6 (27.3)
Record low °C (°F)	3.2 (37.8)	2.0 (35.6)	2.3 (36.1)	−0.5 (31.1)	−2.3 (27.9)	−4.3 (24.3)	−5.2 (22.6)	−3.1 (26.4)	−2.2 (28.0)	−0.8 (30.6)	−0.6 (30.9)	0.4 (32.7)	−5.2 (22.6)
Average rainfall mm (inches)	98.8 (3.89)	80.4 (3.17)	89.8 (3.54)	86.0 (3.39)	98.4 (3.87)	93.4 (3.68)	87.9 (3.46)	76.8 (3.02)	85.5 (3.37)	99.4 (3.91)	90.5 (3.56)	86.8 (3.42)	1,073.7 (42.28)
Source: NIWA
