= Bluff Harbour =

Harbour and lagoon in Southland, New Zealand

Coordinates: 46°35′30″S 168°20′00″E

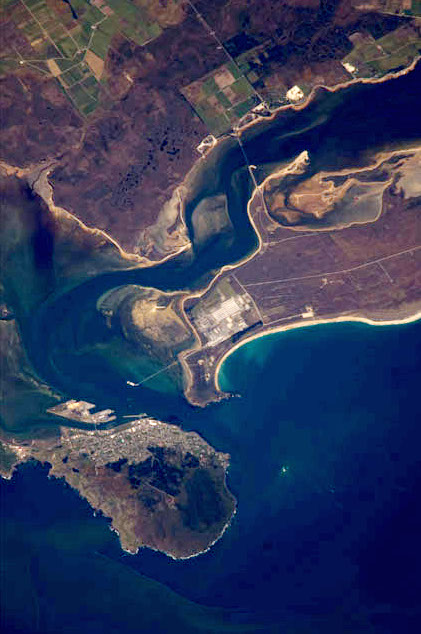
The entrance to Bluff Harbour viewed from the International Space Station in 2008, with Foveaux Strait at bottom. The town of Bluff sits on the north shore of the Bluff promontory, lower left, with the angular form of Island Harbour immediately to its north. Tiwai Point and the entrance to Awarua Bay (top) are to the left

Bluff Harbour is a harbour and lagoon in the South Island of New Zealand, adjacent to the town of Bluff. The main port facilities are located close to the entrance from Foveaux Strait of a large natural inlet which includes a large, low-lying eastern arm, Awarua Bay, immediately to the east of the promontory which gives the town and harbour its name.

== History ==
Bluff is one of New Zealand's earliest continuously occupied European settlements, and has been visited by whalers and sealers since at least 1823. A whaling station was established here in 1836. Bluff Wharf was constructed during the 1860s, and was linked to the nearby city of Invercargill by rail in 1867. As the city's main port, it was a major centre for the export of dairy and meat products in the late 19th and early 20th centuries. The construction of the Tiwai Point Aluminium Smelter in 1971 led to further upgrades in facilities.

A flying boat service operated from the harbour's Ocean Beach in the 1950s and 1960s, both for civilian services and for the RNZAF's patrols of subantarctic waters.

== Port facilities ==
Bluff's port facilities are the southernmost in the South Island, and include the country's southernmost commercial deep water port. The port operates under the commercial name of South Port NZ from a 40-hectare (99-acre) artificial island, Island Harbour, and includes a container terminal. Island Harbour was constructed over the course of the 1950s, and was officially opened in December 1960. A major cargo from the port is alumina from the Tiwai Point Aluminium Smelter, which sits on Tiwai Point, the low-lying eastern shore of the harbour's mouth, directly opposite Island Harbour.

The harbour is also used by Bluff's fishing fleet, mainly smaller vessels and to a large extent centred on Foveaux Strait oyster harvesting. The Bluff oyster is a major New Zealand delicacy.

== Stewart Island ferry service ==
Bluff Harbour is the northern terminus of the Stewart Island ferry, providing a daily service to and from Oban. The ferry journey across Foveaux Strait is about 39 km (21 nmi) long. The first scheduled service across Foveaux Strait began in 1877 for weekly mail delivery, but soon also carried passengers and general cargo. The Bluff Harbour Board and central government provided subsidised ferry services to Stewart Island for 100 years from 1885 through until 1985, when private operators took over the service. The present high speed catamaran service typically takes one hour. As of 2024, the ferry service is operated by the tourism company RealNZ (formerly Real Journeys).

== See also ==
- List of shipwrecks of Southland#Bluff
