= Stirling Point =

New Zealand landmark

Coordinates: 46°36′48″S 168°21′27″E

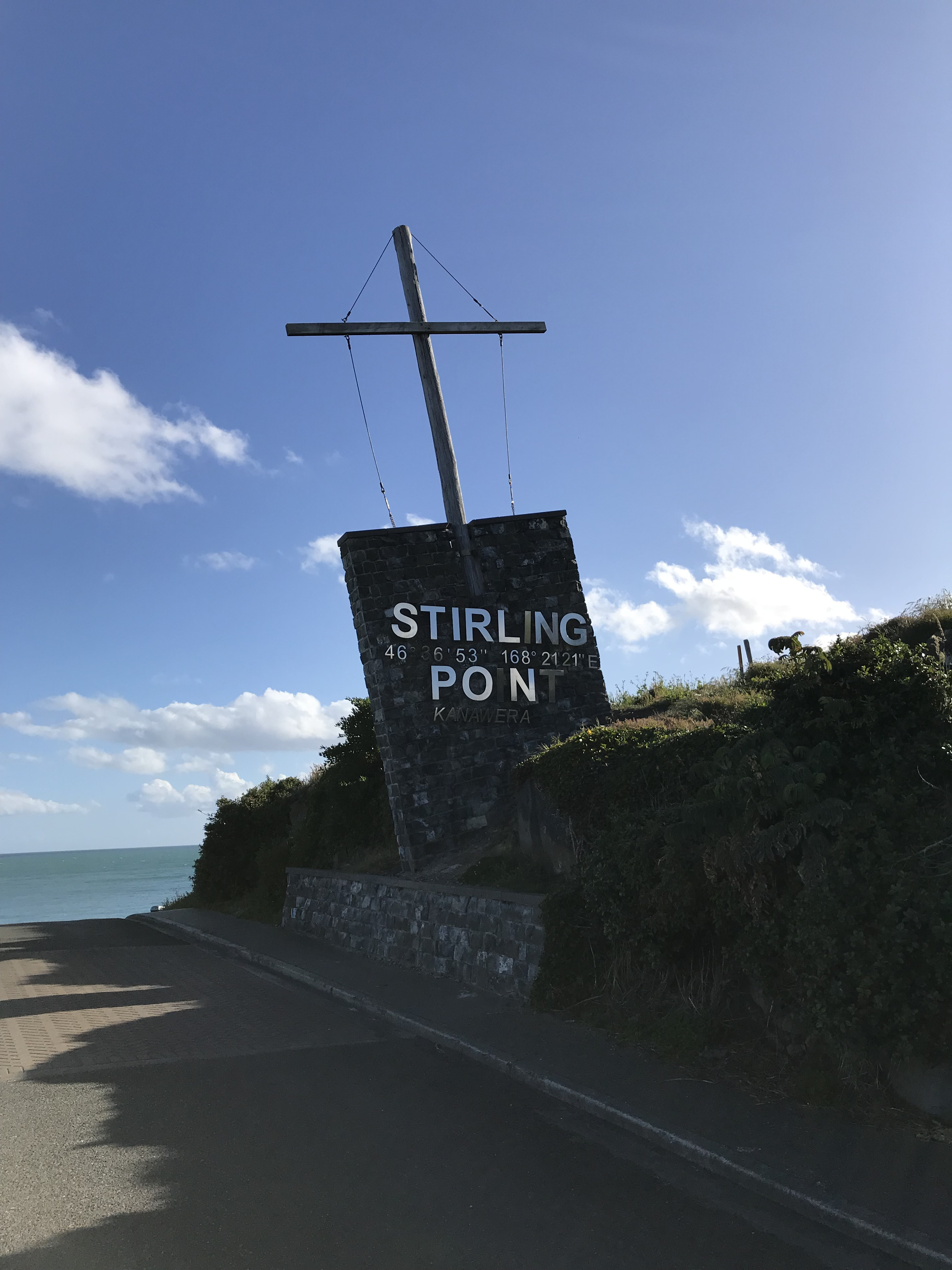
Stirling Point gateway sign

Stirling Point is a landmark at the southern end of the New Zealand in a town called Bluff, New Zealand. It is notable as the southern end of both State Highway 1 and Te Araroa; both these facilities span the length of the country. Stirling Point hosts a signpost with multiple directional signs; it is the most photographed item in Southland. Stirling Point has an anchor chain sculpture which replicates the sculpture on Stewart Island.

== Captain William Stirling ==
The site is named for Captain Stirling (1812–1851) who operated a whaling station for Johnny Jones in this location from 1836 to 1844 when he took on the site's ownership. Stirling, whose real name is believed to be Pankhurst or Pankhirst, was born in Broadstairs, England and ran away to become a seafarer when he was aged 14.

== Stirling Point signpost ==
The Stirling Point signpost was first erected in c. 1960. The original wooden signpost had six destination blades including Dog Island, Ruapuke Island, Wellington, London and the South Pole. After repeated vandalism, a metal post was cemented into place and twelve destination blades were fitted.

Administratively, Bluff is part of Invercargill City and the signpost includes sister cities of Invercargill. The sister-city relationship with Hobart broke down in the late 1990s. The relationship with Kumagaya in Japan was formalised in 1993 and with Suqian in China in 2013. When a Scottish tourist pointed out in 2017 that directions, distances and the coordinates displayed by the signpost were wrong, officials reviewed the setup and confirmed the errors. As part of the corrections implemented in late 2018, Tokyo in Japan was removed from the signpost and replaced with Suqian, but the former sister city Hobart was kept on the sign.

Stirling Point signpost
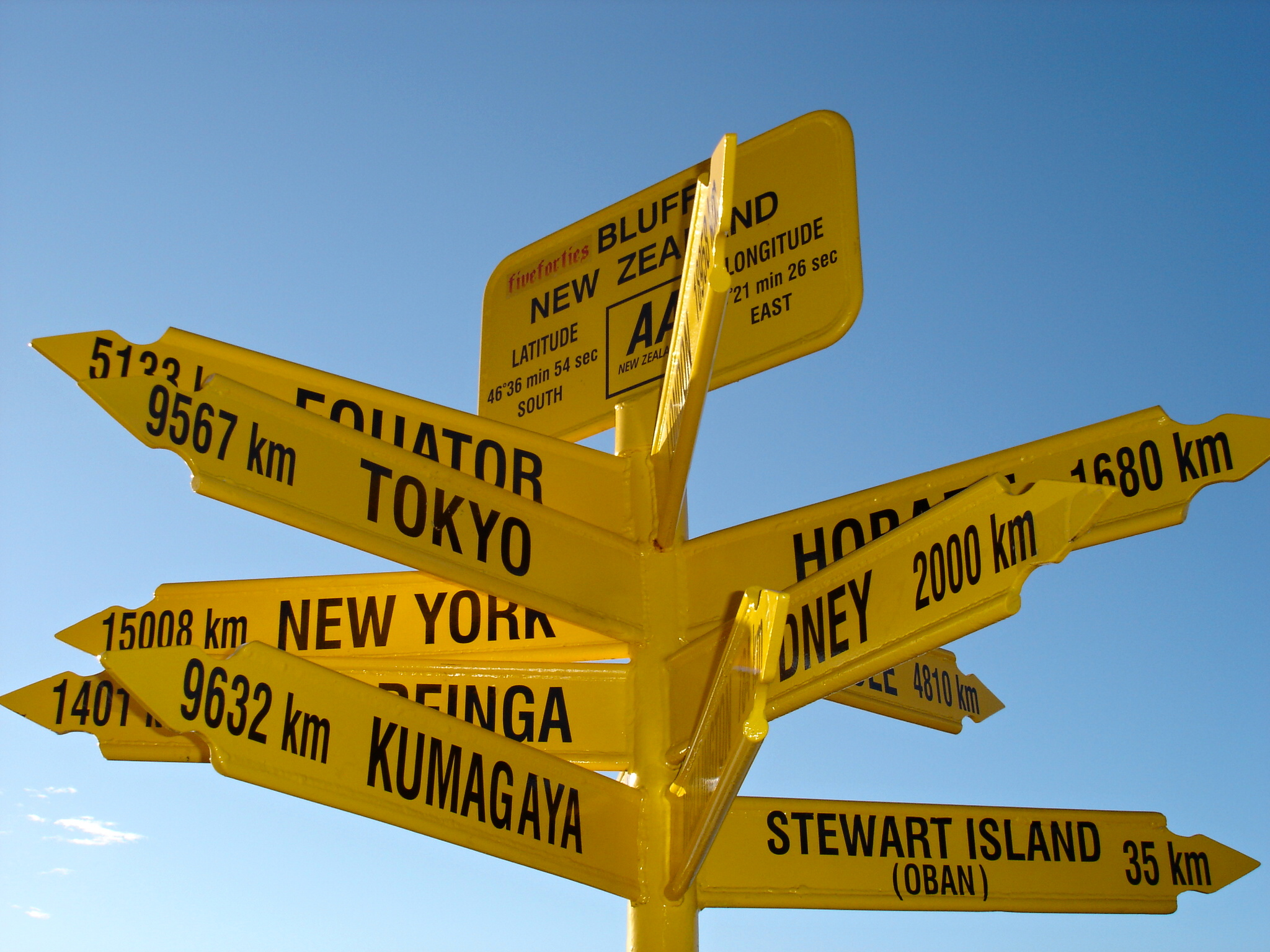
Pre-2018 signpost with incorrect distances and coordinates

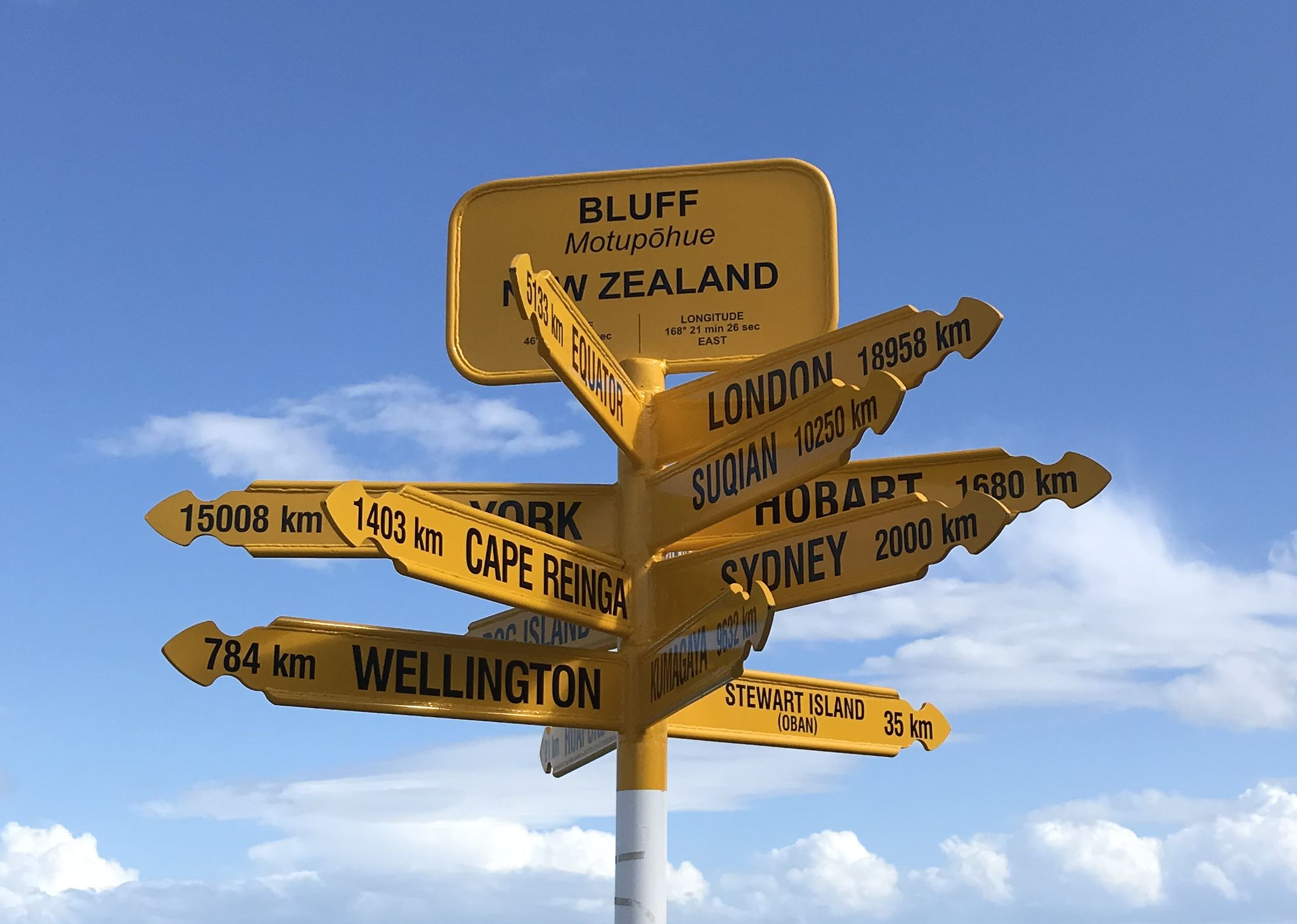
Signpost in late-2018 with information corrected and Suqian added
