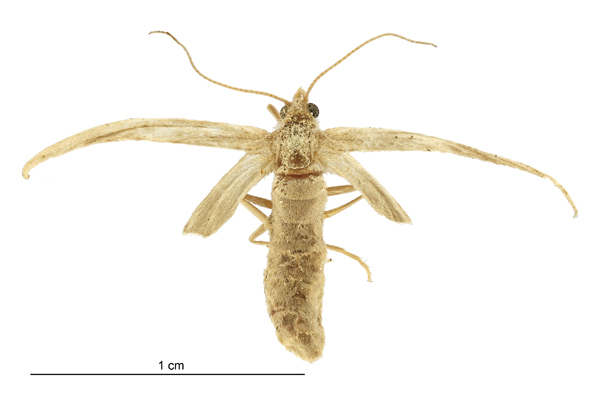
- Female
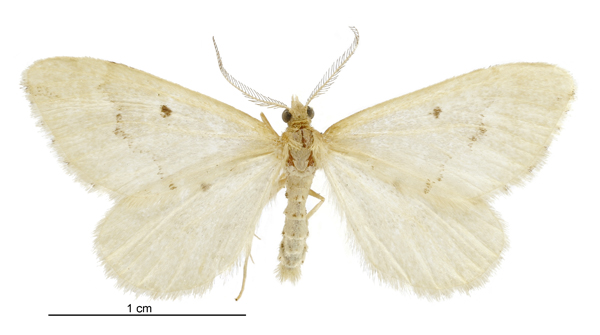
- Male

Scientific classification
- Kingdom: Animalia
- Phylum: Arthropoda
- Clade: Pancrustacea
- Class: Insecta
- Order: Lepidoptera
- Family: Geometridae
- Genus: Asaphodes
- Species: A. oraria

Binomial name
- Asaphodes oraria (Philpott, 1903)

Synonyms
- Xanthorrhoe oraria Philpott, 1903; Xanthorhoe oraria Philpott, 1903; Larentia oraria (Philpott, 1903)

= Asaphodes oraria =

Species of moth

Asaphodes oraria is a species of moth in the family Geometridae. This species is endemic to New Zealand and has been observed in the southern South Island and on Stewart Island / Rakiura. The male is pale yellow coloured and the female has severely reduced wings and is flightless. The habitat of this species is tussock grasslands on coastal sand dunes and in the mountains at elevations of approximately 4,000 ft. The larvae have adapted to feeding on exotic lawn daisy species in the genus Bellis. The adults of this species are on the wing from November to April.

== Taxonomy ==
This species was first described by Alfred Philpott in 1903 and originally named Xanthorrhoe oraria. George Hudson discussed and illustrated this species under the name Xanthorhoe oraria in his 1928 publication The Butterflies and Moths of New Zealand. In 1939 Louis Beethoven Prout placed this species in the genus Larentia. This placement was not accepted by New Zealand taxonomists. In 1971 J. S. Dugdale placed this species within the genus Asaphodes. Dugdale confirmed this placement in 1988. The male holotype, collected at New River, Invercargill, is held at the New Zealand Arthropod Collection.

== Description ==
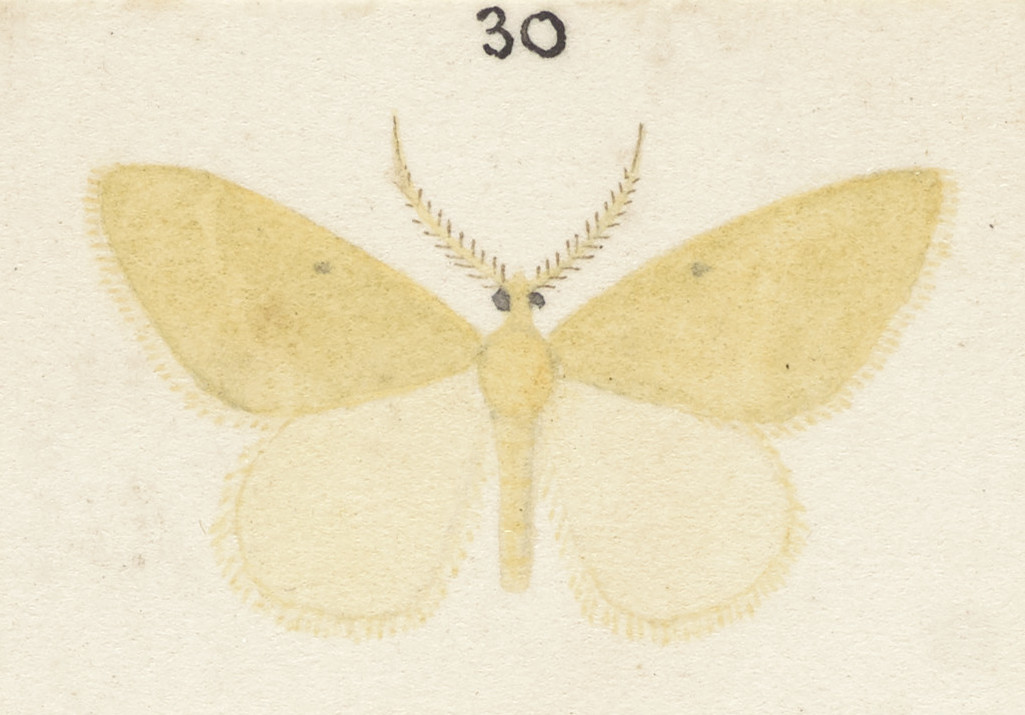
Illustration of male A. oraria by George Hudson.

Philpott described this species as follows:

♂, 20-25 mm. Whole insect pale dull-yellow. In some examples indications of a dark line across fore wings at ⅓, and a more pronounced irregular thin line at ⅔, beyond which the colour is paler, but very few specimens have even these markings. All specimens have, however, a dark spot near costa, before ½. An obscure and dull-looking species differing from other species of the genus in the almost total absence of markings.

The female of the species is semi-apterous and is flightless.

== Distribution ==
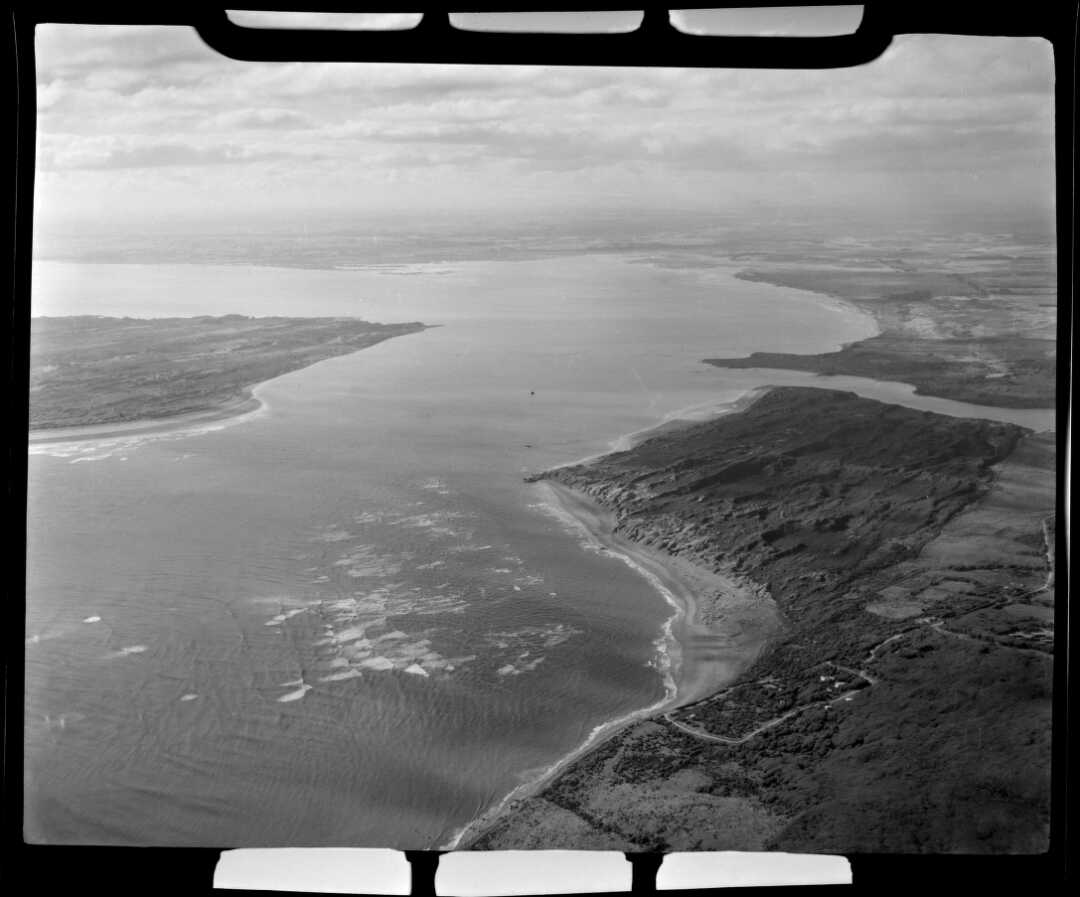
Type locality for this species, New River Estuary, Invercargill.

This species is endemic to New Zealand. This species has been observed in the South Island and Stewart Island including at the type locality of Invercargill, Ben Lomond and Mount Earnslaw / Pikirakatahi in Otago.

== Behaviour ==
The adults of this species are on the wing from November to April.

== Habitat ==
This species inhabits tussock grass on coastal sand dunes and hills. It has also been found in mountainous tussock grass habitat at elevations of approximately 4,000 ft.

== Host species ==
Larvae have been raised on, and has also been observed in the wild feeding on, introduced lawn daisy species within the genus Bellis including Bellis perennis. It has been hypothesised that the native hosts of the larvae of this species are forest floor, wetland, coastal and inter-tussock herbs.
