= Bluff Maritime Museum =

Coordinates: 46.5961°S 168.3317°E

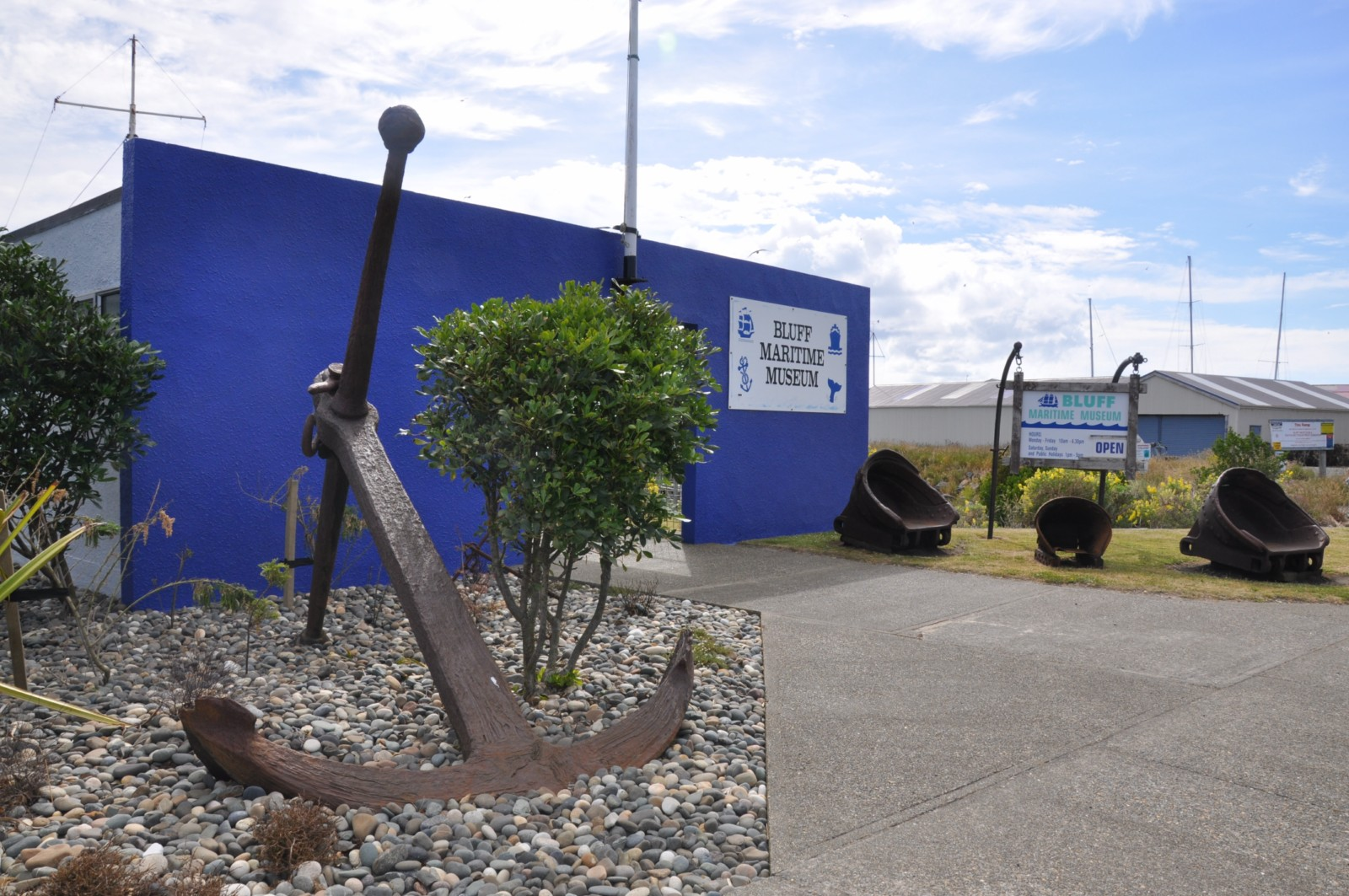

The Bluff Maritime Museum is located in New Zealand's southernmost port of Bluff. The museum is situated on Foreshore Road and contains an extensive collection of Bluff's maritime heritage.

The museum was founded in November 1992, and celebrated its 20th anniversary in early 2012 and early 2013.

Being near the ancient Māori settlement of Omaui and as the oldest European settled community in New Zealand, Bluff's history illustrates the blending of two cultures and the shared community spirit, with the sea remaining as the central focus for many locals.

The museum contains a wide variety of maritime displays, artefacts, miniature models, boats, photographs and a working triple expansion engine. The biggest attraction is a full-sized oystering boat, the Monica, donated by the Jones family. Visitors can climb aboard and explore the entire ship. The museum also exhibits artwork showing scenes of Bluff's early days, when it was officially known as Campbelltown.
