= Lars-Eric Lindblad =

Swedish-American entrepreneur and explorer (1927–1994)

- Born: January 23, 1927; Solna, Sweden
- Died: July 8, 1997 (aged 70)
- Occupations: Entrepreneur, explorer
- Known for: Leading the first tourist expedition to Antarctica

Lars-Eric Lindblad (January 23, 1927 – July 8, 1994) was a Swedish-American entrepreneur and explorer, who pioneered tourism to many remote and exotic parts of the world. He led the first tourist expedition to Antarctica in 1966 in a chartered Argentine navy ship, and for many years operated his own vessel, the MS Lindblad Explorer, in the region. Observers point to the Lindblad Explorer’s 1969 expeditionary cruise to Antarctica as the forerunner to today's sea-based tourism there.

== Biography ==
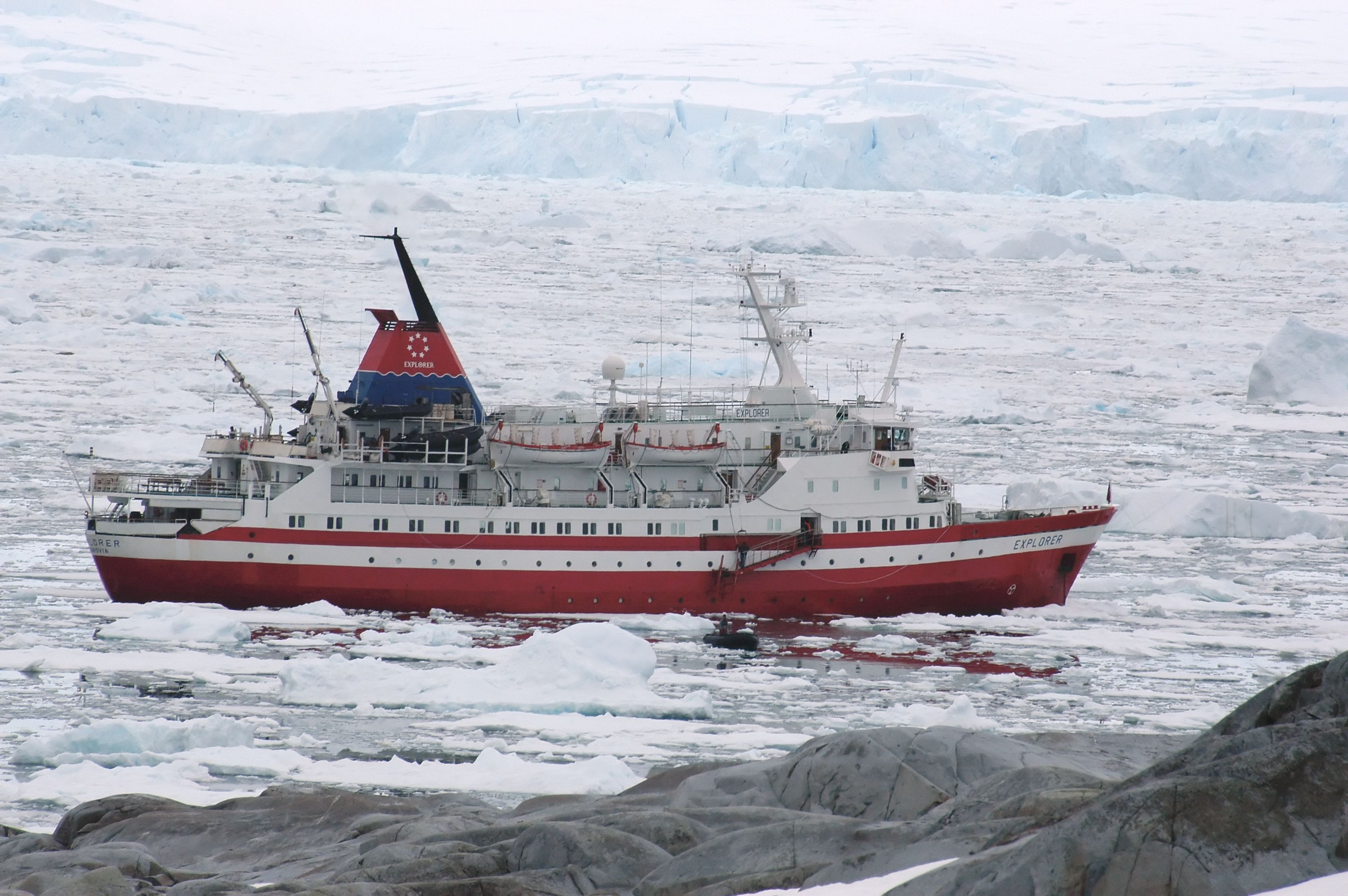
Lars-Eric Lindblad's expeditionary cruise ship, the MS Lindblad Explorer

Lars-Eric Lindblad was born in 1927 in Solna north of Stockholm, Sweden. He immigrated to the United States in 1951 and later became an American citizen. Lindblad pioneered cruising to the Arctic, Tierra del Fuego, the Falkland Islands, but also to places such as the Seychelles and the islands east of Bali. In 1984, he led the first voyage by a tourist ship through the Northwest Passage from Newfoundland over the American continent and via Bering Strait to Yokohama, Japan. The voyage took 40 days and a distance of 8,920 nautical miles (16,520 km) and the adventure was covered by most news media in North America and Europe.

Lindblad was president and chief executive officer of Lindblad Travel in Westport, Connecticut, for more than 30 years. The company introduced tourism in some of the most exotic parts of the globe including cruises to Antarctica, in 1966; to Easter Island and the Galápagos Islands, in 1967, and along the coast of China and Bhutan in 1978. Many of these places had no facilities for visitors in the late 1950s and early 1960s, when Lindblad Travel was in its infancy. In 1972, one of his company's ships, the MV Explorer, ran aground in Antarctica – its passengers, including Lars-Eric Lindblad, were rescued by the Chilean Navy.

Lindblad Travel ceased operations in 1989. In that year, the company was penalized more than $75,000 for violating United States trade embargoes against Vietnam and Cambodia by offering tours there. Lars-Eric Lindblad later said the penalties and legal fees incurred in his dispute with the U.S. Government contributed to the company's going out of business. In an interview in the New York Times when the penalties were levied, Lindblad said he had intentionally violated the sanctions. "I would do it again," he said. "Travel in my opinion is not ordinary trade. Travel is a way of communication. To embargo travel is like burning books or imprisoning journalists." Just three years later in 1992, the embargo against Cambodia was lifted by U.S. President George H. W. Bush, and in February 1994, President Bill Clinton lifted the trade embargo against Vietnam, resulting in a number of American companies starting to offer tours there.

Lindblad was also a noted environmentalist who believed tourism had been responsible for saving many threatened areas. In opening remote and exotic areas of the world to tourism, he became widely recognized as a prominent figure of ecotourism. Lindblad was awarded the Order of the Golden Ark by the Netherlands for services to wildlife conservation, and was in 1987 made a Knight of the Polar Star by the King of Sweden. He also received a number of environmental and cultural awards, served on the council of the World Wildlife Fund and African Wildlife Foundation, and was elected to the Hall of Fame of the American Society of Travel Agents. In 1993, Travel & Leisure magazine named him one of the "top 20 explorers of all time". In 1995, the Advisory Committee on Antarctic Names gave the name Lindblad Cove to a 5-mile wide cove on the Antarctic Peninsula in his honor. His autobiography, Passport to Anywhere with an introduction by the ornithologist Roger Tory Peterson, describes his many adventurous travel experiences.

Lars-Eric Lindblad lived for many years in Wilton, Connecticut. He died of a sudden heart attack in 1994, while on vacation in Stockholm.

== See also ==
- MV Explorer (1969)

== Writings ==
- Lars-Eric Lindblad, Passport to Anywhere: The story of Lars-Eric Lindblad, New York : Times Publishing, 1983. ISBN 978-0-8129-1068-1
