= Bluff, New Zealand =

Town in Southland, New Zealand

Bluff Motupōhue (Māori)
- Town
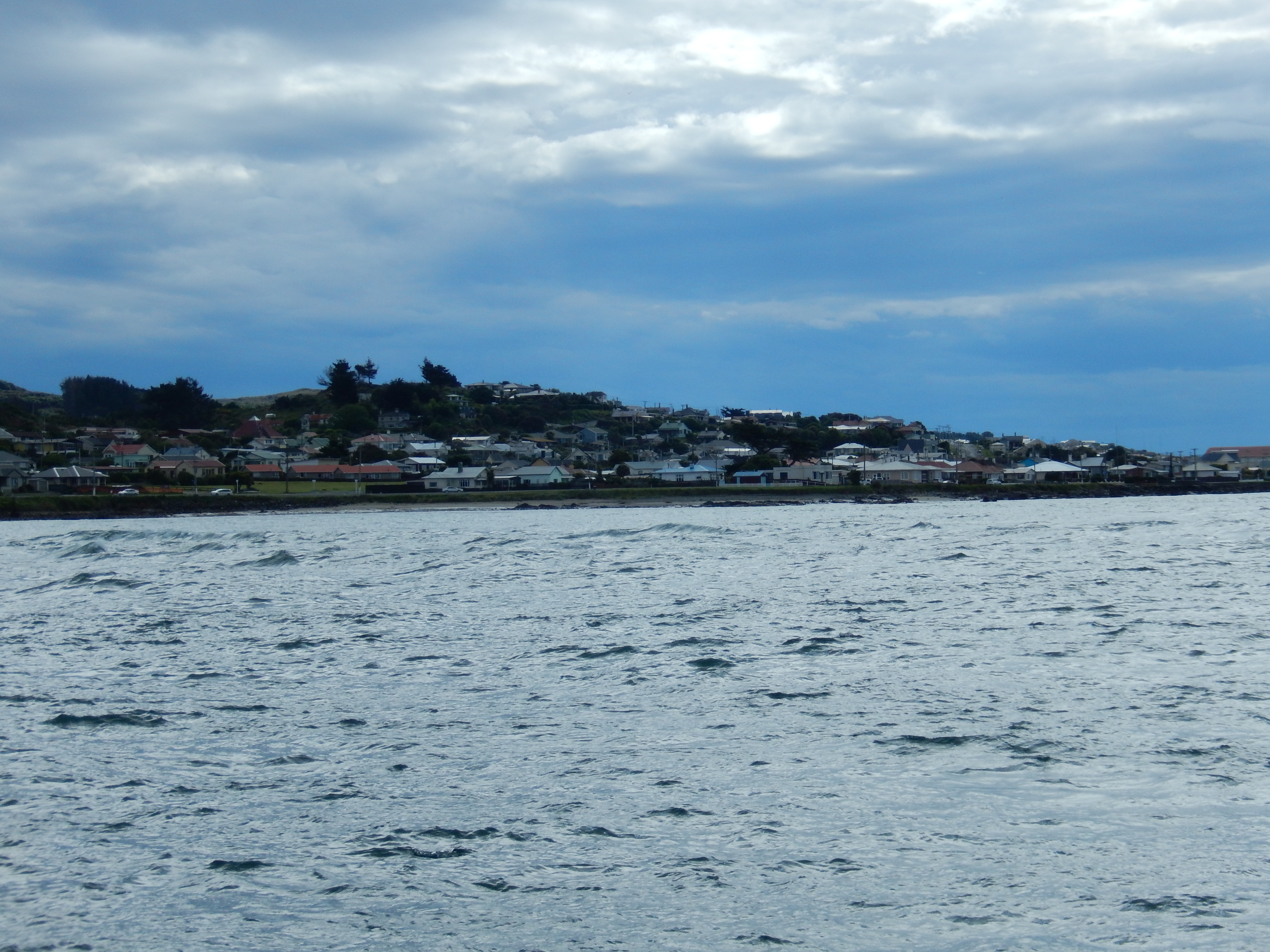
- Bluff from Stewart Island ferry
- Interactive map of Bluff
- Coordinates: 46°36′S 168°20′E
- Country: New Zealand
- Region: Southland Region
- City: Invercargill
- Electorates: Invercargill; Te Tai Tonga (Māori)

Government
  - Regional council: Southland Regional Council
  - Local authority: Invercargill City Council
  - Community board: Bluff Community Board
  - Mayor of Invercargill: Tom Campbell
  - MPs: Penny Simmonds (New Zealand National Party); Mananui Ramsden (New Zealand Labour Party)

Area
  - Total: 10.14 km^{2} (3.92 sq mi)

Population (June 2025)
  - Total: 1,840
  - Density: 181/km^{2} (470/sq mi)
- Time zone: UTC+12 (NZST)
  - Summer (DST): UTC+13 (NZDT)
- Postcode(s): 9814
- Area code: 03

Bluff (Māori: Motupōhue), previously known as Campbelltown, is a town and seaport in the Southland region, on the southern coast of the South Island of New Zealand serving as the main port of Invercargill. It is the southernmost town in mainland New Zealand and, despite Slope Point and Stewart Island being further south, Bluff is colloquially used to refer to the southern extremity of the country (particularly in the phrase "from Cape Reinga to The Bluff"). According to the 2018 census, the resident population was 1,797, a decrease of 6 since 2013.

The Bluff area was one of the earliest areas of New Zealand where a European presence became established. The first ship's crew known to have visited the harbour were from Perseverance which had anchored at Stewart Island in 1813. They were in search of flax trading possibilities, with the first European settlers arriving about 1836 when a whaling station was established by William Stirling.

The town was officially called Campbelltown in 1856, became a borough in 1878, and was renamed Bluff in 1917.

Many of the streets in Bluff are named after rivers in Ireland. These include the streets Blackwater, Shannon, Boyne, Liffey, Barrow, Foyle, Slaney, Bann, Suir, Lee, Bandon and Lagan.

== Geography ==
Bluff is 30 km (20 mi) by road from Invercargill, and the southern terminus of the Bluff Branch, the continuation from Invercargill of the Main South Line. This was one of New Zealand's earliest railways, opening on 5 February 1867.

Bluff is at the end of a peninsula that forms the western side of Bluff Harbour and Awarua Bay, with the port located in the relatively narrow entrance channel. It is on State Highway 1, which terminates one kilometre to the south of the town at Stirling Point. At Stirling Point, a signpost showing the distance and direction to various major cities and locations around the world, including the Equator and the South Pole.

Bluff is dominated by Bluff Hill / Motupōhue (standing at 265 m (870 ft)), which provides some shelter from the prevailing westerly winds. There is a path along the shore through native bush up to this point. The town is named for this bluff, which was known to early whalers as Old Man's Bluff. East across the entry channel from Bluff is Tiwai Point, home to New Zealand's only aluminium smelter and its wharf. Alumina is shipped from Australia and electricity is supplied by the Manapouri Power Station in Fiordland National Park.

A chain sculpture on the coast near Bluff symbolises the Māori belief that Stewart Island is anchored to South Island; a similar sculpture in Rakiura National Park represents the other end of the chain.

=== Climate ===
Like most of New Zealand, Bluff experiences an oceanic climate (Köppen climate classification Cfb). Winters are very mild and only occasionally go below freezing, even though in every month the temperatures had already gotten at least close to it. Likewise, summers are moderately warm and rarely exceed 25 °C, however, even in July and August they already have reached 20 °C. With 32.1 °C, Bluff's highest temperature has been above the one of Auckland Airport.

Climate data for Bluff (Tiwai Point) (1991–2020 normals, extremes 1970–present)
| Month | Jan | Feb | Mar | Apr | May | Jun | Jul | Aug | Sep | Oct | Nov | Dec | Year |
|---|---|---|---|---|---|---|---|---|---|---|---|---|---|
| Record high °C (°F) | 30.2 (86.4) | 32.1 (89.8) | 28.9 (84.0) | 24.2 (75.6) | 21.9 (71.4) | 21.9 (71.4) | 20.2 (68.4) | 20.0 (68.0) | 23.8 (74.8) | 23.7 (74.7) | 27.9 (82.2) | 29.0 (84.2) | 32.1 (89.8) |
| Mean maximum °C (°F) | 26.0 (78.8) | 25.4 (77.7) | 23.7 (74.7) | 20.9 (69.6) | 17.6 (63.7) | 14.5 (58.1) | 14.0 (57.2) | 15.7 (60.3) | 19.0 (66.2) | 20.6 (69.1) | 22.3 (72.1) | 24.8 (76.6) | 27.7 (81.9) |
| Mean daily maximum °C (°F) | 18.0 (64.4) | 18.0 (64.4) | 16.8 (62.2) | 14.8 (58.6) | 12.5 (54.5) | 10.3 (50.5) | 9.9 (49.8) | 11.0 (51.8) | 12.7 (54.9) | 13.8 (56.8) | 15.1 (59.2) | 17.0 (62.6) | 14.2 (57.5) |
| Daily mean °C (°F) | 14.5 (58.1) | 14.5 (58.1) | 13.2 (55.8) | 11.3 (52.3) | 9.2 (48.6) | 7.1 (44.8) | 6.4 (43.5) | 7.4 (45.3) | 9.0 (48.2) | 10.3 (50.5) | 11.6 (52.9) | 13.4 (56.1) | 10.7 (51.2) |
| Mean daily minimum °C (°F) | 10.9 (51.6) | 10.9 (51.6) | 9.6 (49.3) | 7.9 (46.2) | 6.0 (42.8) | 3.8 (38.8) | 2.9 (37.2) | 3.8 (38.8) | 5.3 (41.5) | 6.9 (44.4) | 8.2 (46.8) | 9.9 (49.8) | 7.2 (44.9) |
| Mean minimum °C (°F) | 6.1 (43.0) | 6.0 (42.8) | 4.5 (40.1) | 2.4 (36.3) | 0.6 (33.1) | −1.2 (29.8) | −2.1 (28.2) | −1.1 (30.0) | 0.3 (32.5) | 1.8 (35.2) | 3.4 (38.1) | 5.0 (41.0) | −2.6 (27.3) |
| Record low °C (°F) | 3.2 (37.8) | 2.0 (35.6) | 2.3 (36.1) | −0.5 (31.1) | −2.3 (27.9) | −4.3 (24.3) | −5.2 (22.6) | −3.1 (26.4) | −2.2 (28.0) | −0.8 (30.6) | −0.6 (30.9) | 0.4 (32.7) | −5.2 (22.6) |
| Average rainfall mm (inches) | 98.8 (3.89) | 80.4 (3.17) | 89.8 (3.54) | 86.0 (3.39) | 98.4 (3.87) | 93.4 (3.68) | 87.9 (3.46) | 76.8 (3.02) | 85.5 (3.37) | 99.4 (3.91) | 90.5 (3.56) | 86.8 (3.42) | 1,073.7 (42.28) |

== Demographics ==
Historical population
| Year | Pop. | ±% p.a. |
|---|---|---|
| 2006 | 1,797 | — |
| 2013 | 1,803 | +0.05% |
| 2018 | 1,797 | −0.07% |

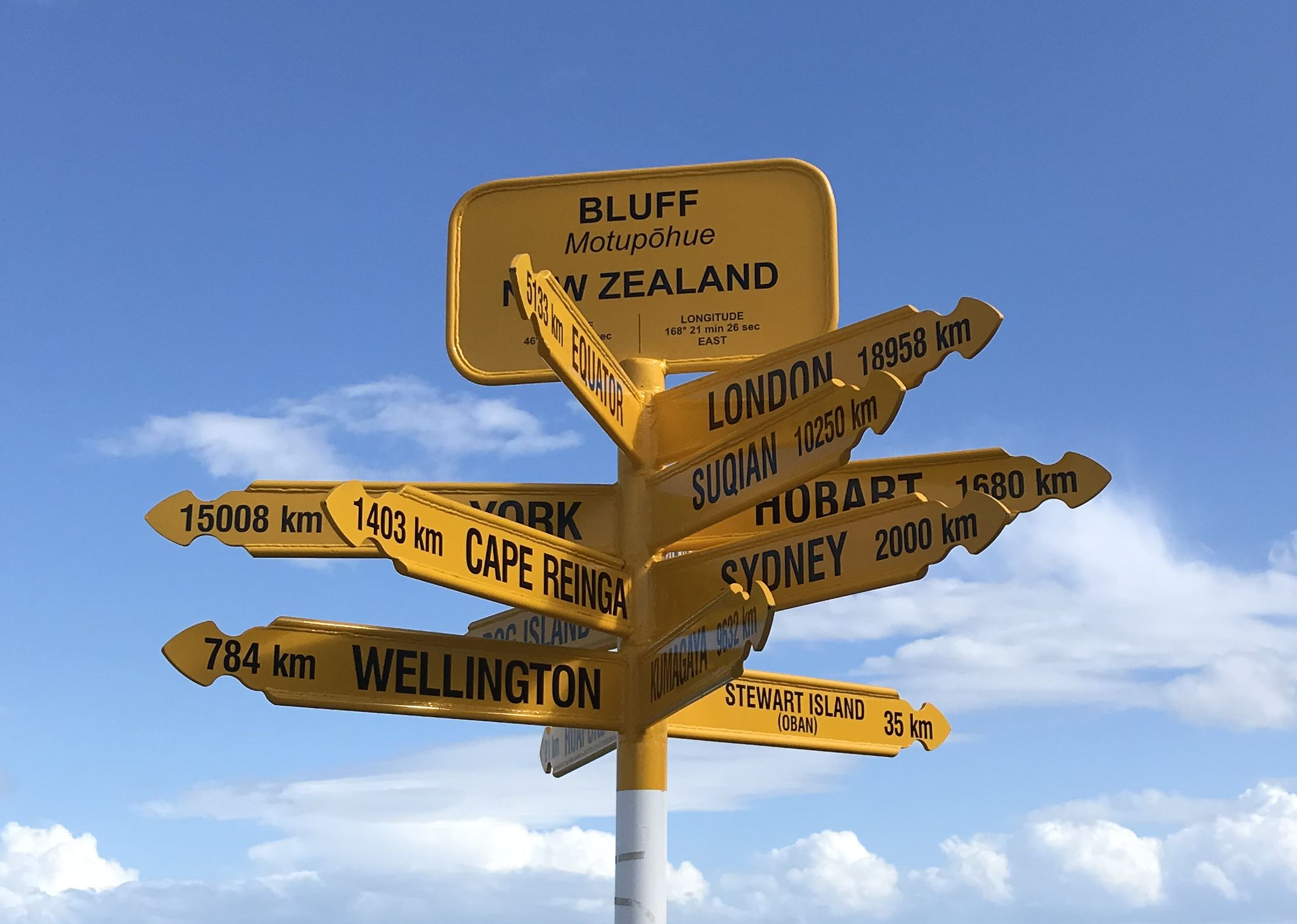
Signpost at Stirling Point, Bluff

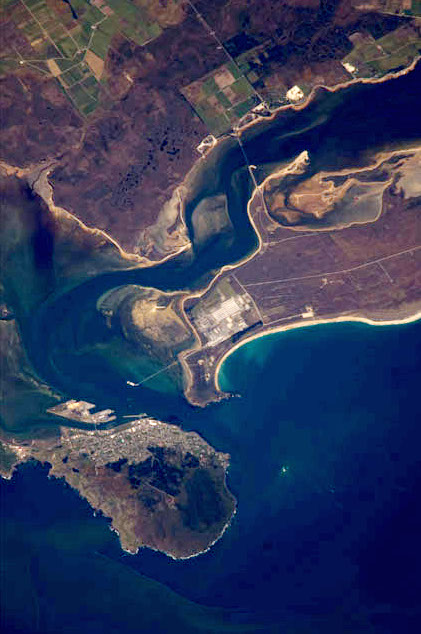
Awarua Plain (top), Tiwai Point (centre) and Bluff (lower left) viewed from the International Space Station in 2008

Bluff covers 10.14 km^{2} (3.92 sq mi) and had an estimated population of 1,840 as of June 2025, with a population density of 181 people per km^{2}.

Bluff had a population of 1,797 at the 2018 New Zealand census, a decrease of 6 people (−0.3%) since the 2013 census, and unchanged since the 2006 census. There were 780 households, comprising 918 males and 879 females, giving a sex ratio of 1.04 males per female. The median age was 47.3 years (compared with 37.4 years nationally), with 330 people (18.4%) aged under 15 years, 228 (12.7%) aged 15 to 29, 858 (47.7%) aged 30 to 64, and 381 (21.2%) aged 65 or older.

Ethnicities were 77.6% European/Pākehā, 46.4% Māori, 6.2% Pasifika, 1.3% Asian, and 1.5% other ethnicities. People may identify with more than one ethnicity. The percentage of people born overseas was 6.0, compared with 27.1% nationally.

Although some people chose not to answer the census question about religious affiliation, 54.9% had no religion, 32.7% were Christian, 1.0% had Māori religious beliefs, 0.2% were Hindu, 0.2% were Muslim, 0.5% were Buddhist and 1.0% had other religions.

Of those at least 15 years old, 102 (7.0%) people had a bachelor's or higher degree, and 528 (36.0%) people had no formal qualifications. The median income was $30,500, compared with $31,800 nationally. 189 people (12.9%) earned over $70,000 compared to 17.2% nationally. The employment status of those at least 15 was that 726 (49.5%) people were employed full-time, 228 (15.5%) were part-time, and 45 (3.1%) were unemployed.

== Economy ==
South Port is the port operating company of the Port of Bluff, and is owned to 66.5% by the Southland Regional Council. A small port in comparison with New Zealand giants like Ports of Auckland or Port of Tauranga, it moves around 2.2 million tonnes of cargo each year, mostly New Zealand coastal reshipment. The Tiwai Point aluminium smelter and fossil fuel exploration activity in the Great South Basin may ensure the future relevance of the port. A recent (2008) weekly container ship service also lifted the volumes.

In July 2020, Rio Tinto announced closure of the aluminium smelter in August 2021, after which discussions were initiated on how to utilise the energy generated in Manapouri.

Bluff Harbour is the terminus for the twice-daily catamaran ferry to Stewart Island / Rakiura, 60 kilometres (37 mi) south across Foveaux Strait. It is the main gateway for New Zealand ships heading down to the Antarctic. The harbour is home to the Foveaux Strait oyster fleet. Bluff oysters are renowned for their succulence and flavour, and are considered a delicacy nationwide, with Bluff holding an annual oyster festival. The oyster quota was severely reduced during the 1990s due to the effects of the toxic protozoan parasite Bonamia exitiosa upon the oyster beds.

The Bluff Branch (formerly the Invercargill-Bluff Railway) was the first railway line in Otago and Southland.

== Culture ==
Te Rau Aroha marae is located at Bluff. It is a marae (meeting ground) for the Awarua Rūnanga branch of Ngāi Tahu, and includes the Tahu Potiki wharenui.

== Attractions ==
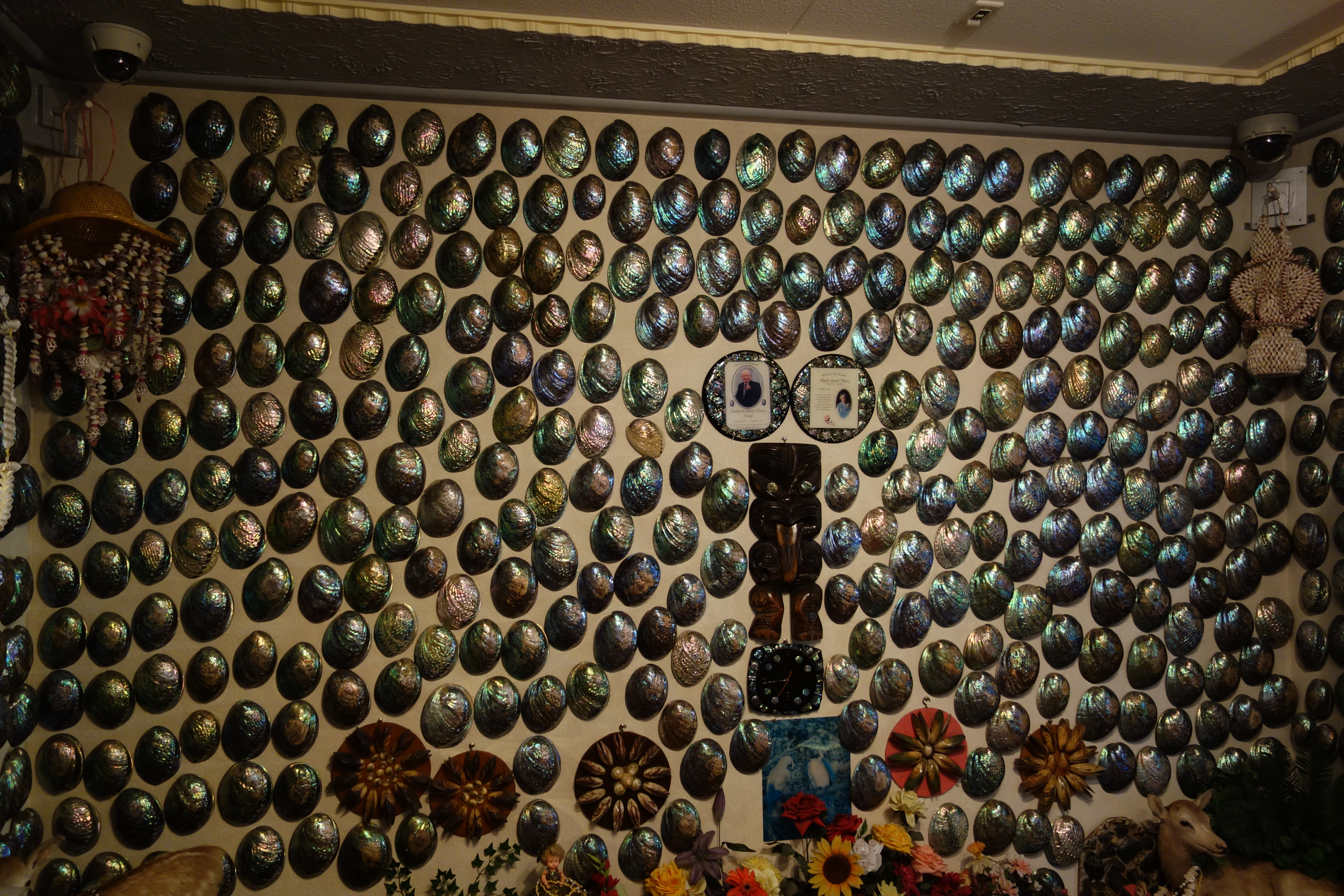
Flutey paua house at Canterbury Museum

The town previously included the Paua House, created by Fred and Myrtle Flutey. This was an ordinary bungalow transformed by having the outside walls totally covered in pāua shells. The interior was also extensively decorated with paua and there is an extensive collection of (often kitsch) paua-decorated ornaments, utensils and trinkets.

The house became a museum after the death of the owners, but was sold and in March 2007 the exhibits removed to Christchurch. It has been on permanent display at the Canterbury Museum since July 2008.

The Bluff Maritime Museum contains an extensive collection of models, boats, artefacts, displays, a working triple expansion engine and a full sized oystering boat, the Monica.

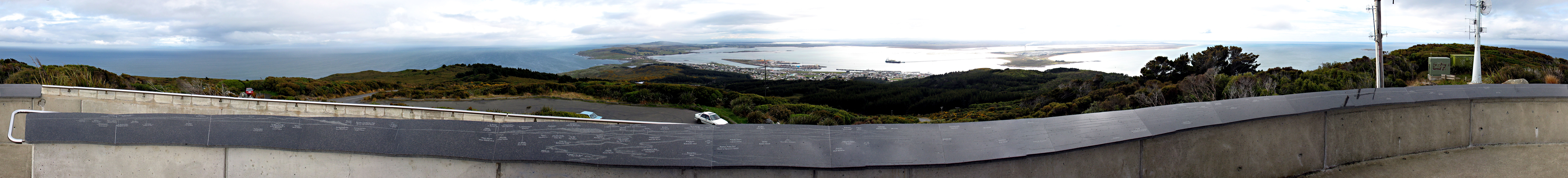
Panorama from the summit of Bluff Hill. The Bluff port is in the centre, and the aluminium smelter in the mid-distance in the centre-right

== Education ==
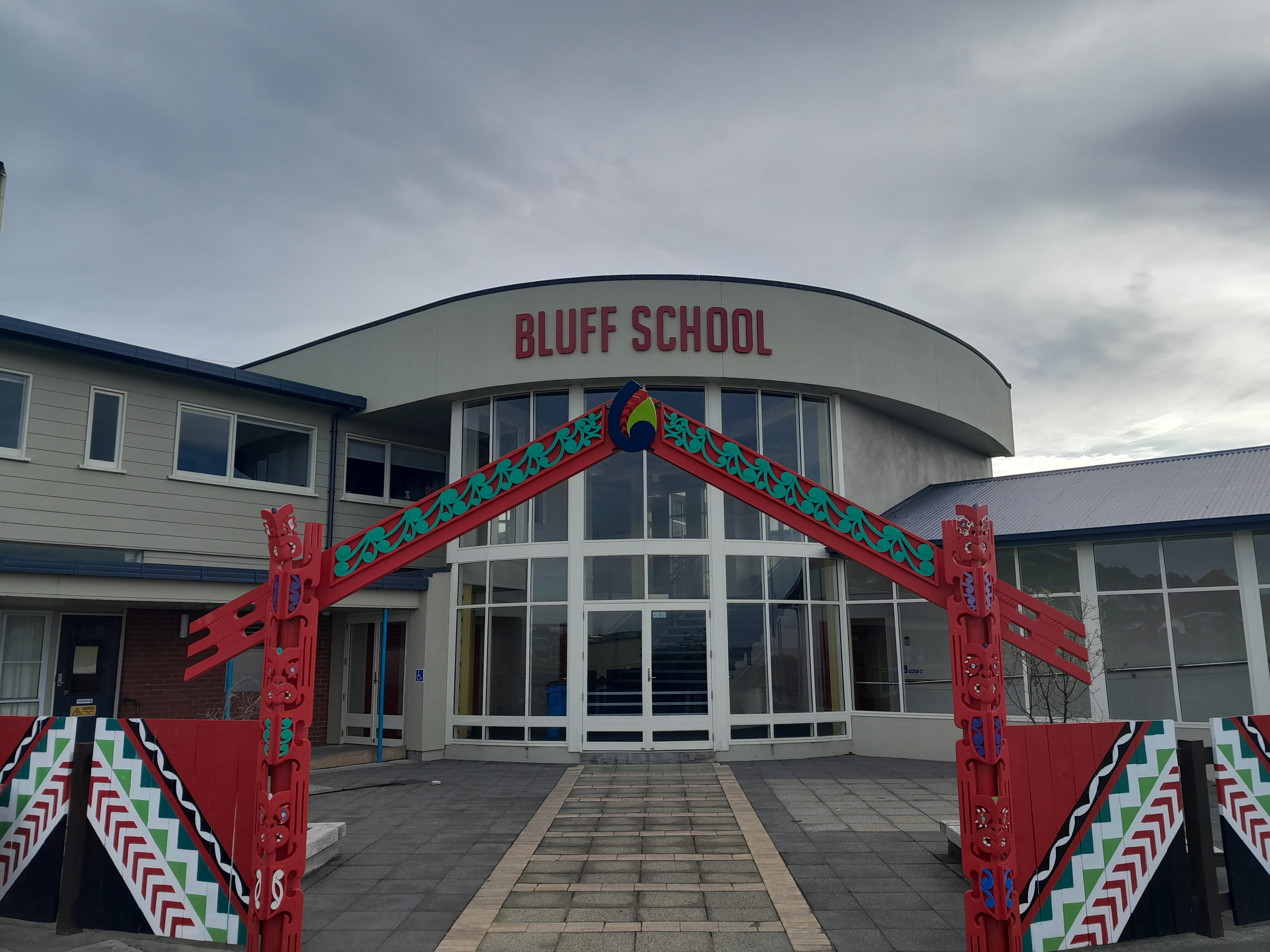
Bluff School (2023)

Bluff School is a state full primary school serving years 1 to 8 with a roll of 112 students as of July 2026. The school opened in 1867.

St Teresa's School is a state-integrated Catholic school serving years 1 to 8 with a roll of 6 students. It has been operating since at least 1901.

== Notable people ==
- Hannah Ward Barron (1829–1898), successful businesswoman and hotel proprietor
- Thomas Francis Doyle (1893–1968), member of the New Zealand Legislative Council
- Joseph George Ward (1856–1930), Mayor of Campbelltown 1881–1886 and 1897–98, MP for Awarua 1887–1919 and for Invercargill 1925–1930, Prime Minister of New Zealand 1906–1912 and 1928–30.
- Dorothy May De Lany (1908–1970), first woman president of a trade union in New Zealand
- Vincent Aubrey Ward (1886–1946), New Zealand businessman and politician
- Donald Cameron Hamilton (1883–1925), New Zealand All Black
- Thomas “Alf” Budd (1922–1989), New Zealand All Black
- Charles “Eddie” Robinson (1927–1983), New Zealand All Black
- Hugh Bannerman (1887–1917), journalist, cricket player and soldier

== Gallery ==
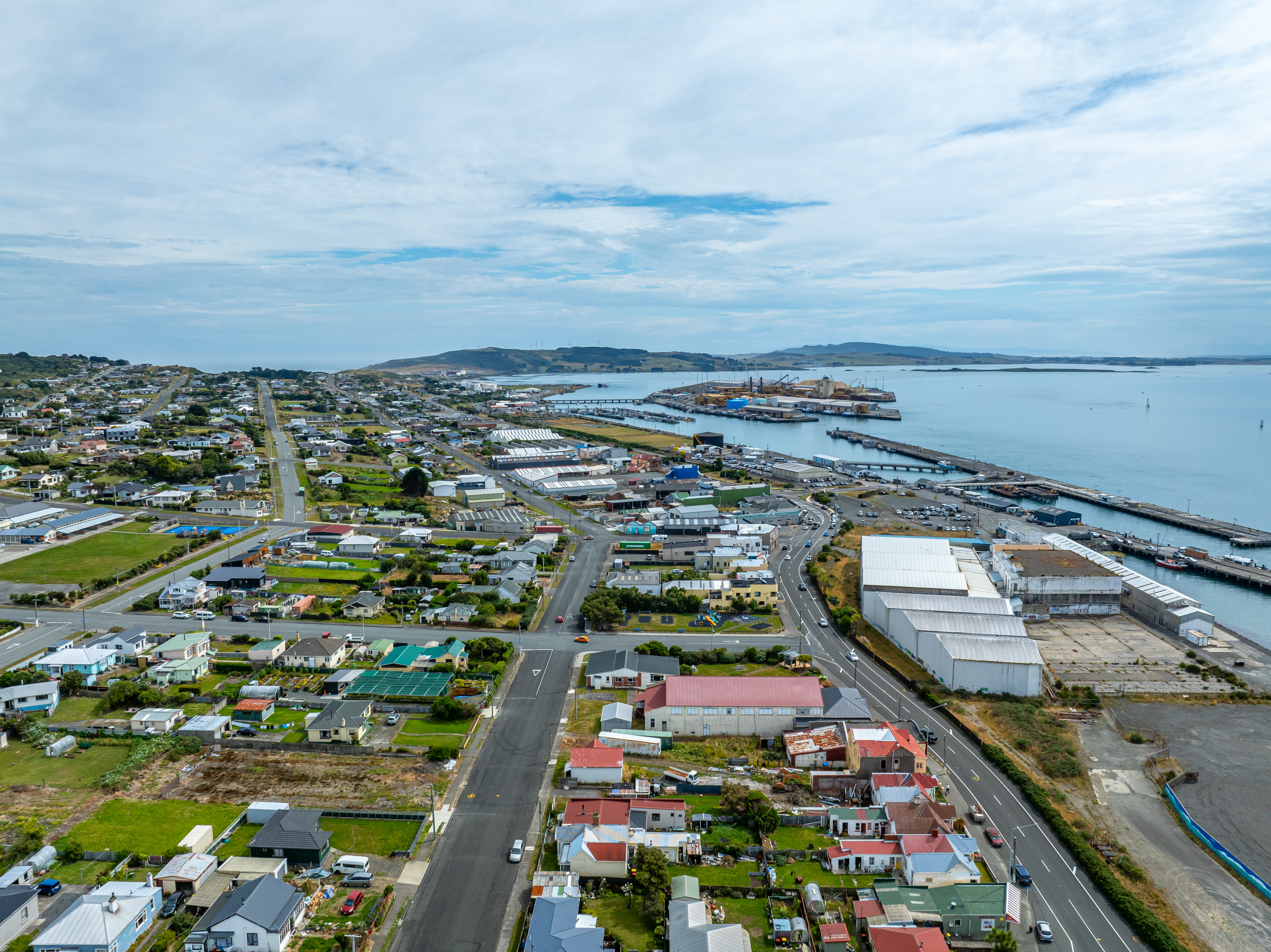
Aerial Bluff

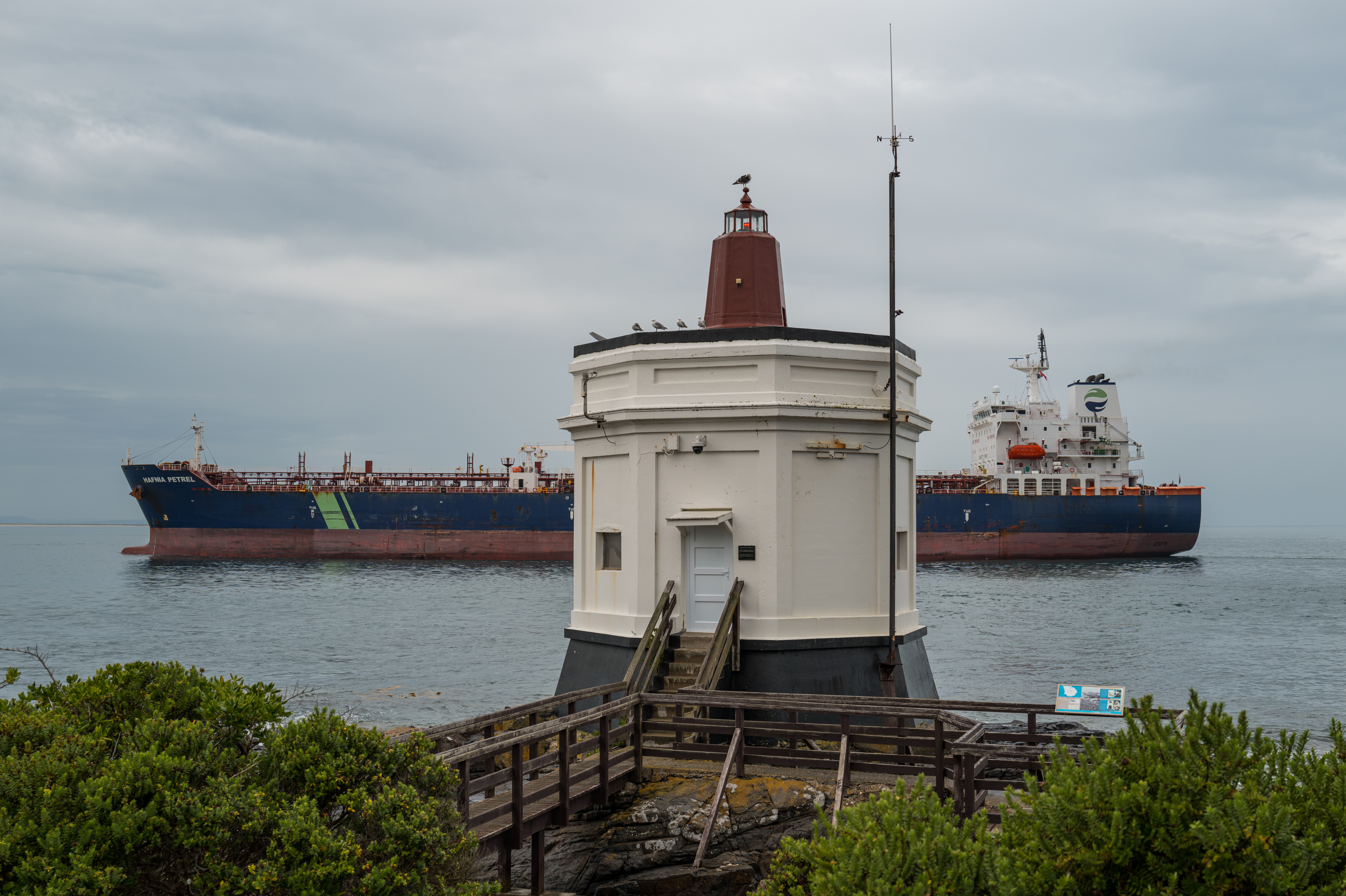
Stirling Point Pilot Station

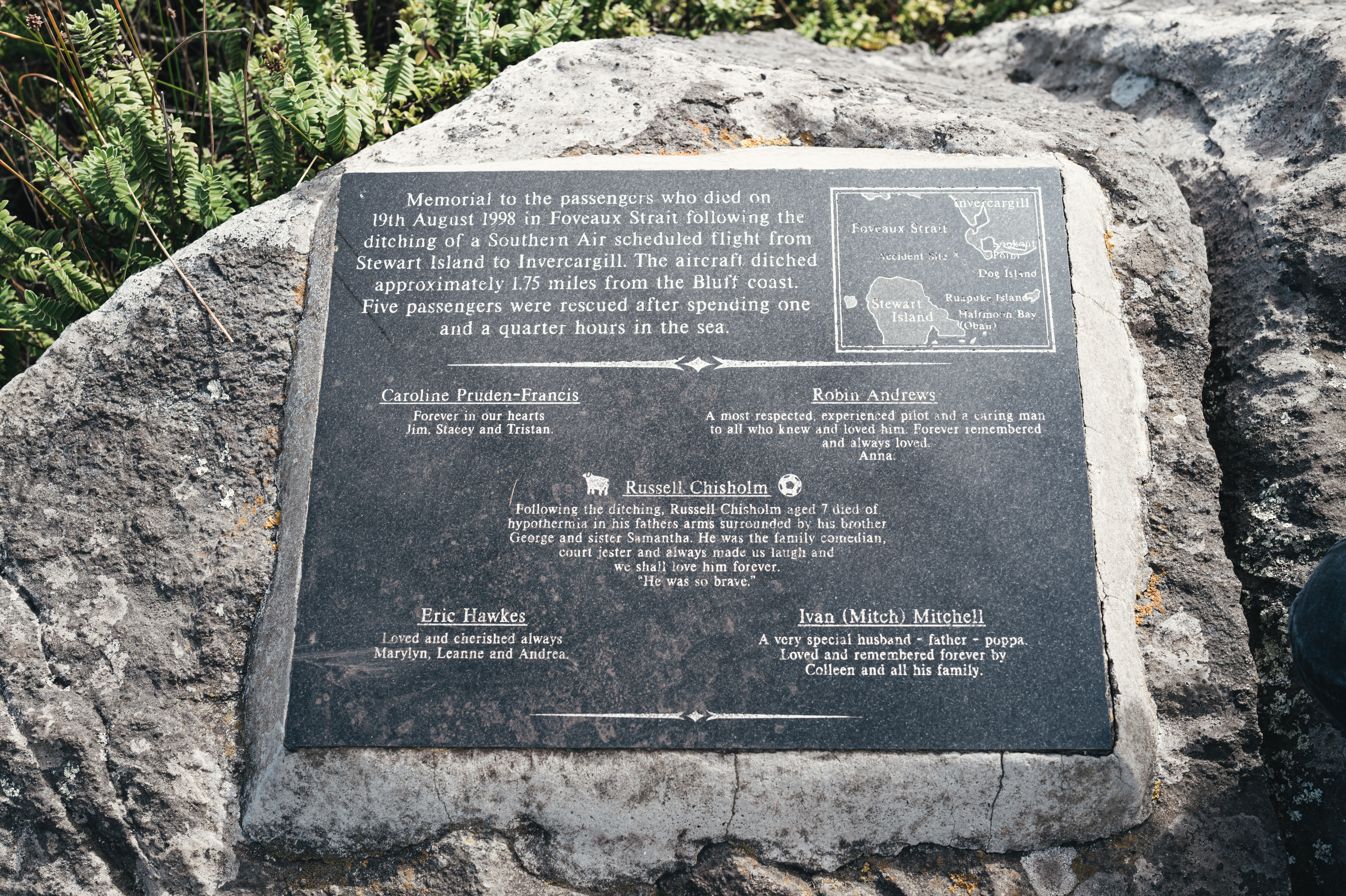
Memorial plaque for the 1998 Foveaux Strait plane crash

== See also ==
- Ocean Beach (Bluff Harbour)
