= Castle Point =

Castle Point may refer to:

- Borough of Castle Point, a district of Essex, England
- Castle Point (UK Parliament constituency)
- Castle Point, Missouri, census-designated place in the United States
- Castle Point, New Jersey, place in the United States
- Castle Point, New York, hamlet in the United States

== See also ==
- Castle Point Anime Convention, held in Secaucus, New Jersey, United States
- Castlepoint, New Zealand settlement
  - Castle Point Lighthouse, near Castlepoint
- Castlepoint Shopping Centre, Bournemouth, Dorset, England
- Castlepoint, a townland in County Cork, Ireland, see List of townlands of the barony of Kerrycurrihy
- Castlepoint, a townland in County Cork, Ireland, see List of townlands of the barony of West Carbery (West Division)
