= Matiu / Somes Island Lighthouse =

Lighthouse in Wellington, New Zealand

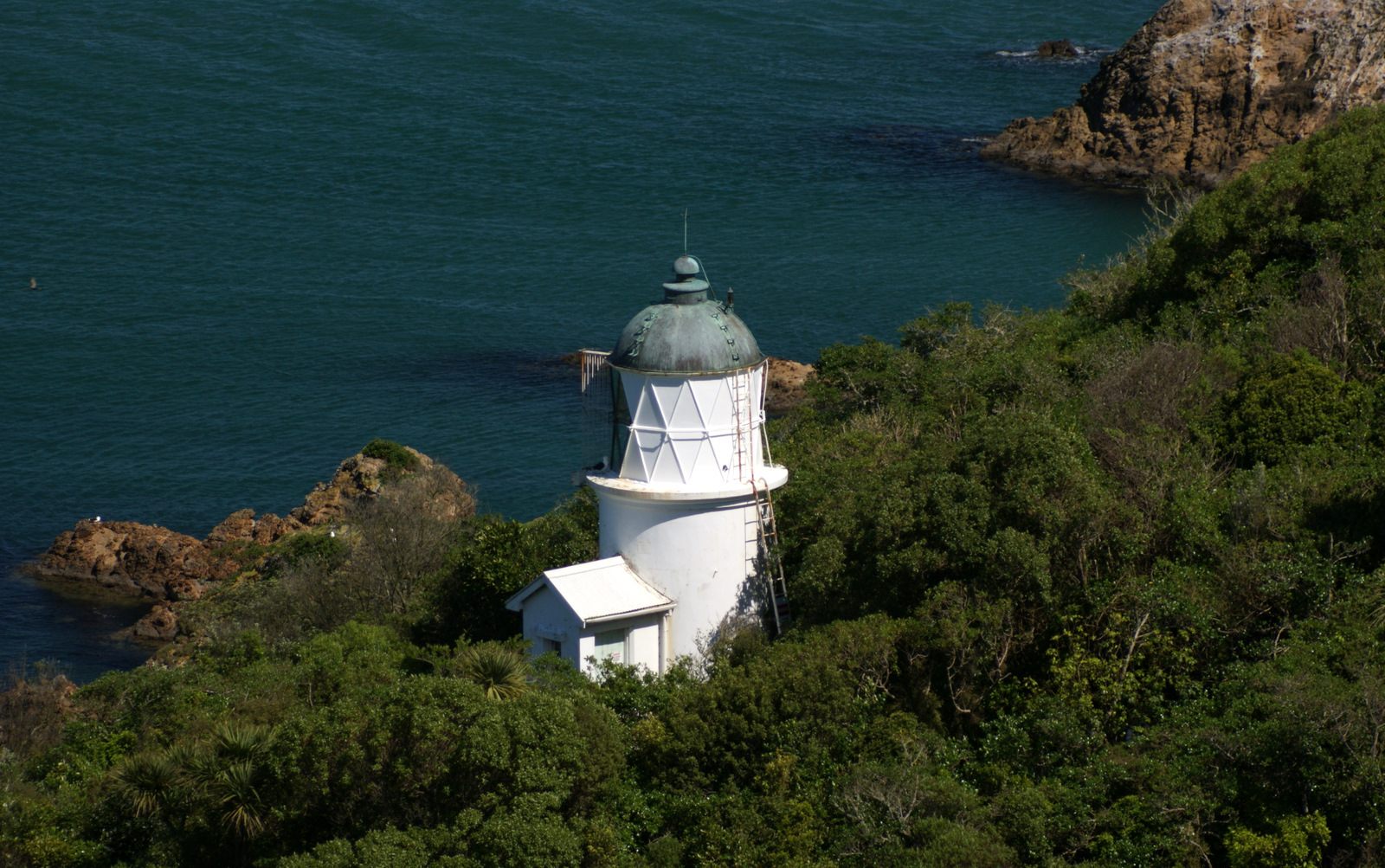
- Location: Matiu / Somes Island, Wellington Region, New Zealand
- Coordinates: 41°15′35″S 174°51′49″E

Tower
- Constructed: 1900
- Construction: brick (tower)
- Automated: 1924
- Height: 9 m (30 ft)
- Shape: round
- Operator: Greater Wellington Regional Council

Light
- First lit: 21 February 1900
- Focal height: 29 m (95 ft)
- Lens: second order Fresnel lens
- Range: 7 nmi (13 km; 8.1 mi)
- Characteristic: LFl(3) WRG 10s
- Original lighthouse
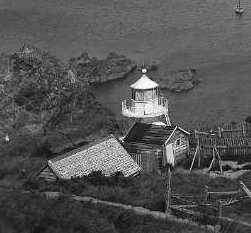
- Constructed: 1866
- Construction: cast iron (tower), brick (foundation)
- Height: 10 ft (3.0 m)
- Shape: octagon
- Power source: rapeseed oil, kerosene
- First lit: 17 February 1866
- Lens: fourth order Fresnel lens

The Matiu / Somes Island lighthouse is a harbour navigation light located in Wellington Harbour, New Zealand. It is a sector light, operating from the southern end of Matiu / Somes Island to mark a safe approach through the harbour navigation channel. The first lighthouse on the site was established in 1866. It was the first inner harbour lighthouse in New Zealand, and one of only eight lighthouses nationwide at that time. However, by 1895 there were multiple complaints that it was inadequate. A replacement lighthouse with a more powerful light was built on an adjacent site and commissioned on 21 February 1900. The light was automated on 1 April 1924 and converted to electricity after 1945. The lighthouse is currently operated and maintained by the Greater Wellington Regional Council.

== The first lighthouse ==
A signal station was established on Somes Island around 1840, but it was not until 1866 that the first lighthouse on the site was erected to aid safe navigation in the harbour. The lighthouse was built upon an octagonal cast iron tower, 10 feet (3.0 m) high, bolted to a brick foundation. The lantern contained a fourth order Fresnel lens, and had a 270 degree illumination angle. The lighthouse served as a sector light, marking a safe approach through the harbour channel, and was fitted with ruby and green glass screens either side of a white beam directed down the channel. The light was first lit on 17 February 1866. The lamp initially burned colza oil until it was converted to kerosene in 1878.

When commissioned it was the first inner harbour lighthouse in New Zealand, and one of only eight lighthouses nationwide at that time.

The lighthouse was originally the responsibility of the Wellington Provincial Council, but was transferred to the Marine Department in 1874, prior to the abolition of provincial government in 1876. By 1895 there were complaints to the Marine Department that the Somes Island light was inadequate. A decision was made to upgrade the Somes Island light from a fourth order to a second order, and a replacement lighthouse apparatus was ordered in 1898.

The original lighthouse was dismantled in 1900 and was later re-installed at Tuhawaiki (Jack's) Point Timaru.

== Replacement in 1900 ==
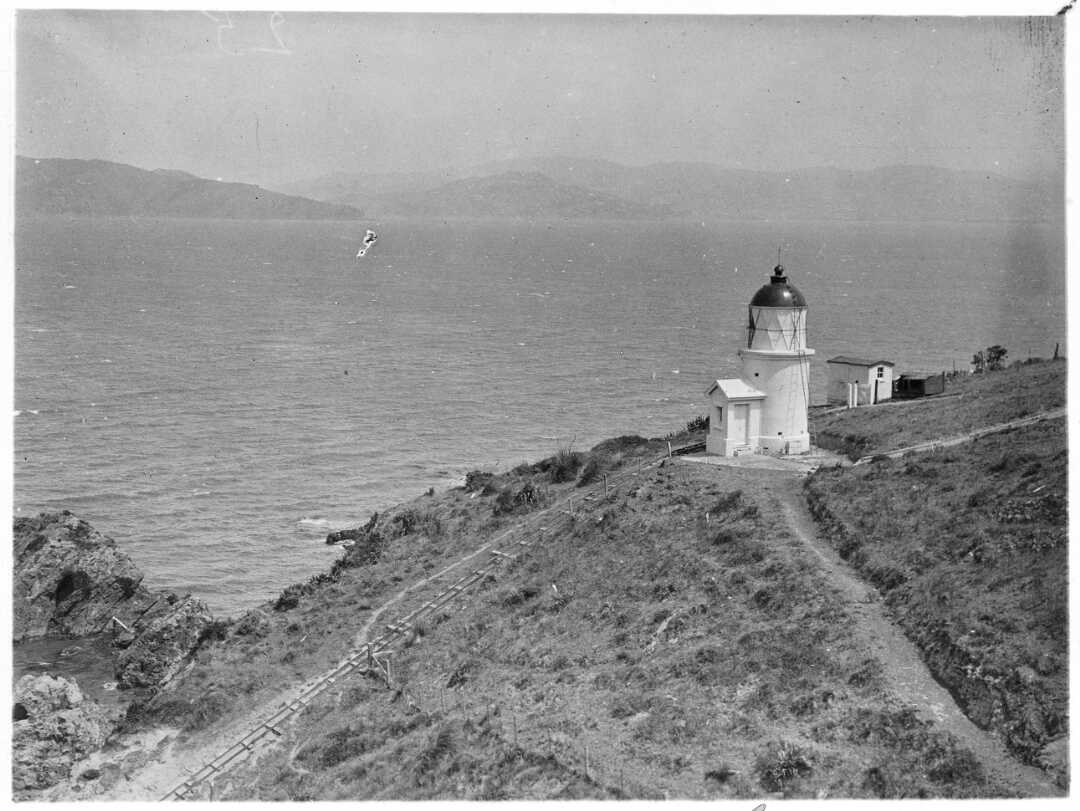
Somes Island lighthouse - in 1915

The replacement lighthouse was built on a circular brick tower adjacent to the existing lighthouse. The design made use of the lantern that had become available from the decommissioning in 1897 of the first Farewell Spit lighthouse. The new Somes Island lighthouse was commissioned on 21 February 1900.

The lighthouse was automated on 1 April 1924 with the installation of a flashing Dalén light supplied by the AGA company. The light used an acetylene burning lamp combined with a solar sensor which automatically operates the light only during darkness. It was converted to an electrical light after 1945.

== Lighthouse operations ==
The first lighthouse keepers were William Lyall (Principal keeper) and David Susan.

In 1912, the management of the station was transferred from the Marine Department to the Wellington Harbour Board, although the Marine Department continued to maintain the light and charge costs to the Board.

The responsibility for ownership and operation of the lighthouse was transferred to the Greater Wellington Regional Council in 1989. The original lighthouse reserve is now part of the Matiu / Somes scientific reserve.
