= Cape Reinga Lighthouse =

Lighthouse in New Zealand

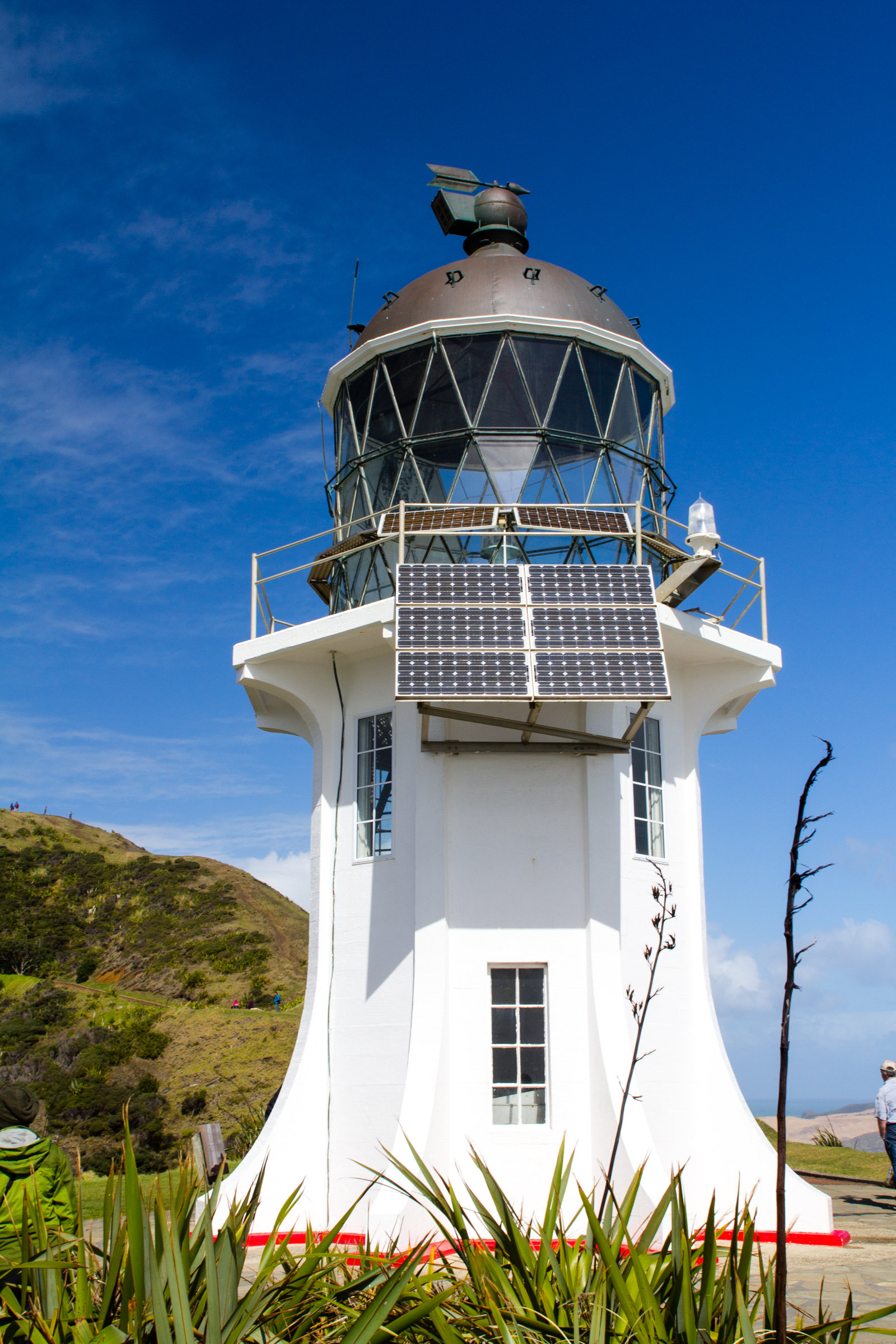
- Location: North Island, Far North District, Northland Region, New Zealand
- Coordinates: 34°25′36″S 172°40′40″E

Tower
- Constructed: 1941
- Construction: concrete (tower)
- Automated: 1987
- Height: 10 m (33 ft)
- Shape: octagon
- Markings: White (tower), black (lantern)
- Power source: solar power
- Operator: Maritime New Zealand

Light
- First lit: 1941
- Focal height: 165 m (541 ft)
- Range: 19 nmi (35 km; 22 mi)
- Characteristic: Fl W 12s

Cape Reinga Lighthouse is a lighthouse at Cape Reinga in the Northland Region of the North Island of New Zealand. It is owned and operated by Maritime New Zealand. The lighthouse is a common New Zealand icon and a popular tourist destination although the lighthouse itself is not open to the public.

== History ==
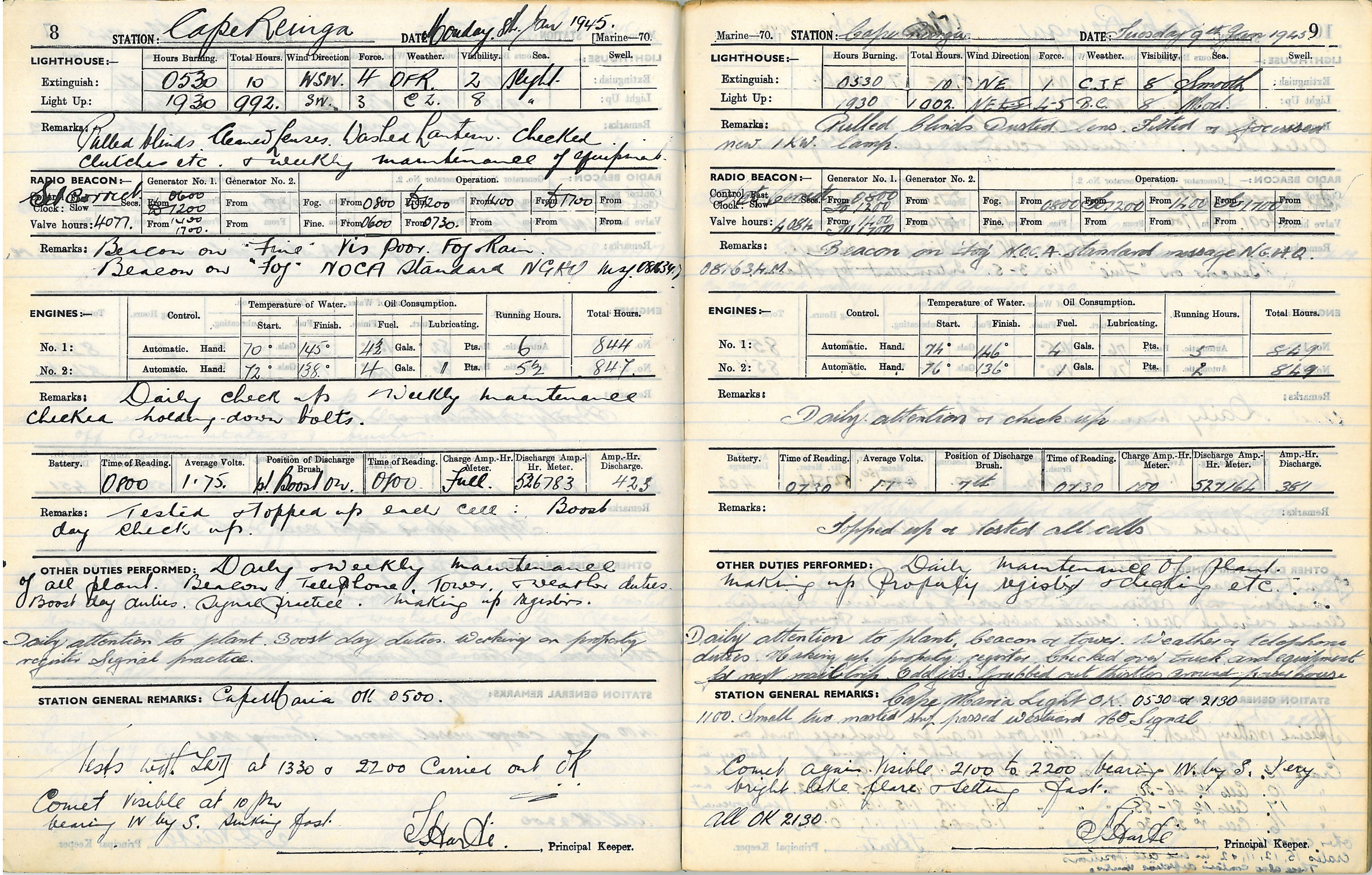
Journal kept by Cape Reinga Lighthouse Keeper (1945)

The lighthouse was built in 1941 and first lit during May of that year. It was the last manned light to be built in New Zealand and replaced the Cape Maria Van Diemen Lighthouse, located on nearby Motuopao Island, which had been built in 1879. Accessing that lighthouse was difficult due to the rough seas in the area, so in 1938, it was decided to move the lighthouse to Cape Reinga for safety reasons. The complete lantern fittings from Motuopao Island were reused at Cape Reinga, though the new lighthouse was fitted with a 1000 watt electrical lamp instead that could be seen for 26 nautical miles (48 km). The lamp was powered by a diesel generator.

In 1987, the lighthouse was fully automated and the lighthouse keepers were withdrawn. The lighthouse is now monitored remotely from Wellington. In May 2000 the original lens and lamp were replaced by a 50 watt beacon. The beacon is powered by batteries that are recharged by solar cells. The beacon flashes every 12 seconds and can be seen for 19 nautical miles (35 km).

== See also ==
- List of lighthouses in New Zealand
