= Cape Egmont Lighthouse =

Lighthouse in New Zealand

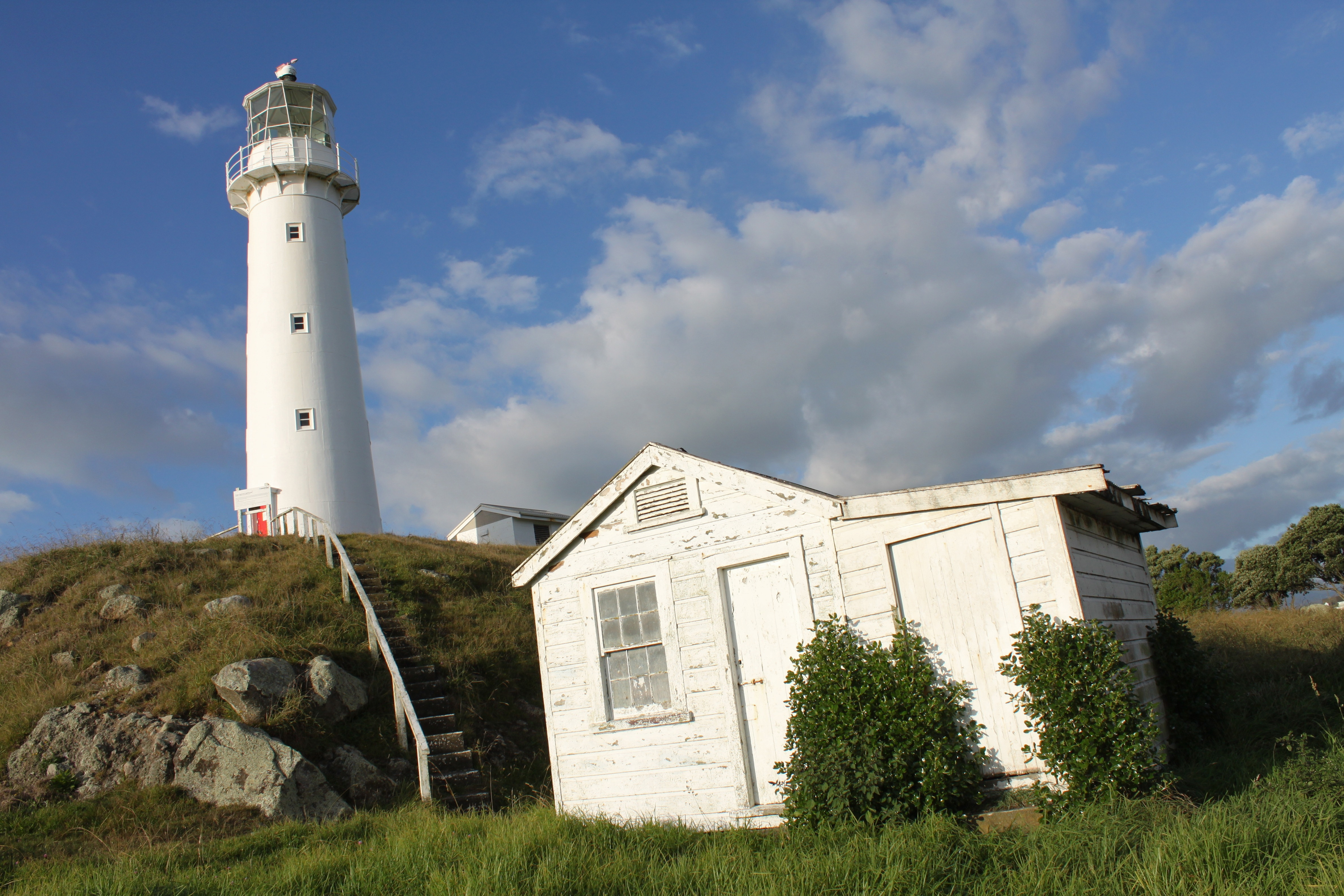
- Cape Egmont Lighthouse
- Location: Cape Egmont, South Taranaki District, Taranaki, New Zealand
- Coordinates: 39°16′34″S 173°45′18″E

Tower
- Constructed: 1881
- Construction: cast iron (tower)
- Automated: 1986
- Height: 20 m (66 ft)
- Shape: cylinder
- Markings: White
- Power source: mains electricity
- Operator: Maritime New Zealand

Light
- Focal height: 33 m (108 ft)
- Range: 19 nmi (35 km; 22 mi)
- Characteristic: Fl W 8s

Heritage New Zealand – Category 2
- Designated: 11 December 2003
- Reference no.: 820

Cape Egmont Lighthouse is a lighthouse at Cape Egmont in the Taranaki Region of the North Island of New Zealand. It is owned and operated by Maritime New Zealand. The light was manufactured by Simpson & Co., Pimlico, London, in 1864 and erected on Mana Island to the north west of Porirua in 1865, but it was sometimes confused with the Pencarrow Head light at the entrance to Wellington Harbour, particularly in bad weather. In 1877 the Mana light was dismantled and moved to Cape Egmont in anticipation of being reinstalled there, but Taranaki Māori refused to cede land for the new lighthouse. Government negotiations with Māori continued until 1881 before a site for the lighthouse was agreed to. A party of 50 men was stationed at the site during construction in case of Māori opposition. The light was activated in August 1881, and was said to be visible from 15 nautical miles away in clear weather. The lighthouse is situated on a small rise or knoll about 240 yards from the high water mark, at the easternmost point of Cape Egmont. It is constructed of pre-cast iron segments on a concrete base.

A new light was installed in the lighthouse in 1929, and the light was electrified in 1951. In 1999 the light was replaced with a modern rotating beacon. The original light was then installed in a replica lighthouse at Warea, several kilometres to the north of the Cape Egmont lighthouse.

The Cape Egmont light was fully automated in 1986.

Cape Egmont Lighthouse is listed as a Historic Place Category 2 by Heritage New Zealand.

== See also ==
- List of lighthouses in New Zealand
