= Cuvier Island Lighthouse =

Lighthouse in New Zealand

Cuvier Island Lighthouse Repanga
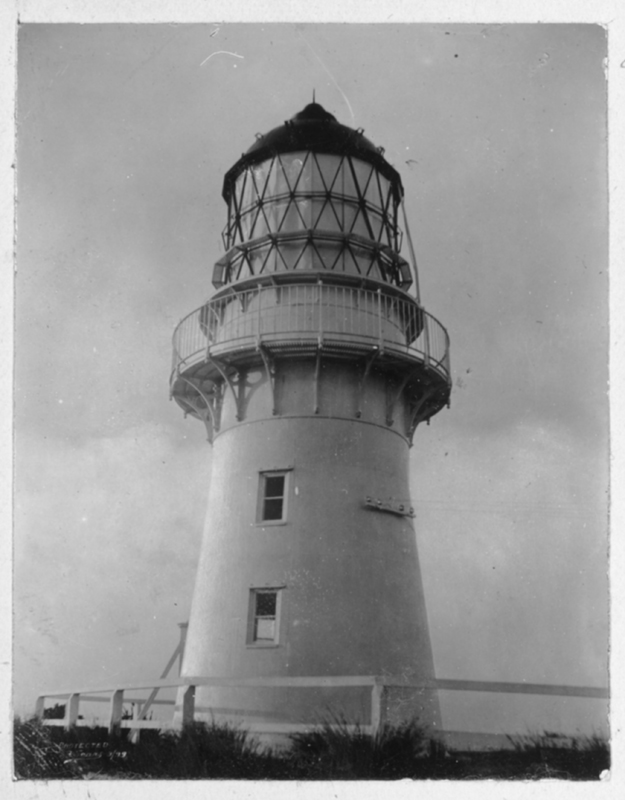
- Location: Cuvier Island; North Island; New Zealand
- Coordinates: 36°26′23.2″S 175°47′10.3″E

Tower
- Constructed: 1889
- Construction: cast iron tower
- Automated: 1982
- Height: 15 metres (49 ft)
- Shape: cylindrical tower with balcony and lantern
- Markings: white tower, black lantern dome
- Power source: solar power
- Operator: Department of Conservation

Light
- First lit: 1889
- Focal height: 119 metres (390 ft)
- Range: 19 nautical miles (35 km; 22 mi)
- Characteristic: Fl W 15s.

Cuvier Island Lighthouse is a lighthouse built in 1889 on Cuvier Island, a small island off the east coast of the North Island of New Zealand. It is the most distant of New Zealand's off-shore lighthouses. It is owned and operated by Maritime New Zealand.

== History ==
From as early as the 1860s, mariners called for a lighthouse at Cuvier Island because it was on the direct course of many ships heading for Auckland, and in 1874 the Marine Department proposed that a light be installed at Cuvier Island. In 1883, the Auckland Chamber of Commerce added its voice to those calling for a lighthouse at either Cuvier Island or Red Mercury Island. In 1884 the Marine Department visited both islands and finally confirmed that it would build a lighthouse at Cuvier Island, the government taking 40 acres of land on the island from its Māori owners "for lighthouse purposes".

The lighthouse was the first one built in New Zealand using cast iron. Arch Hill ironworks in Auckland manufactured the tower, which was constructed of 80 cast iron plates in five tiers and weighed 40 tons. Inside the tower were wrought iron staircases. The completed 30-ft high tower (not including the light) was displayed at the iron works for public inspection before being disassembled for transport to Cuvier Island. The paraffin lantern and associated machinery were imported from Edinburgh, Scotland, and the glass came from Paris, France.

The light began operating on 22 September 1889, and was visible from about 26 nautical miles away in good weather. The lighthouse was deemed a great success, and was said to have the brightest lantern of any lighthouse in New Zealand at the time. Works associated with the lighthouse included three cottages for the lighthouse keepers, stores, a tramway and a landing with a crane.

In 1939 the light was converted from oil to diesel-generated electricity. The last lighthouse keepers left in 1982 when the light was fully automated, and in 1996 it was converted from diesel to solar power. The light is controlled from the Maritime New Zealand headquarters in Wellington. Cuvier Island itself is a wildlife reserve which is managed by the Department of Conservation and is part of an island restoration project.

== See also ==
- List of lighthouses in New Zealand
