= Rangitoto Lighthouse =

Lighthouse in New Zealand

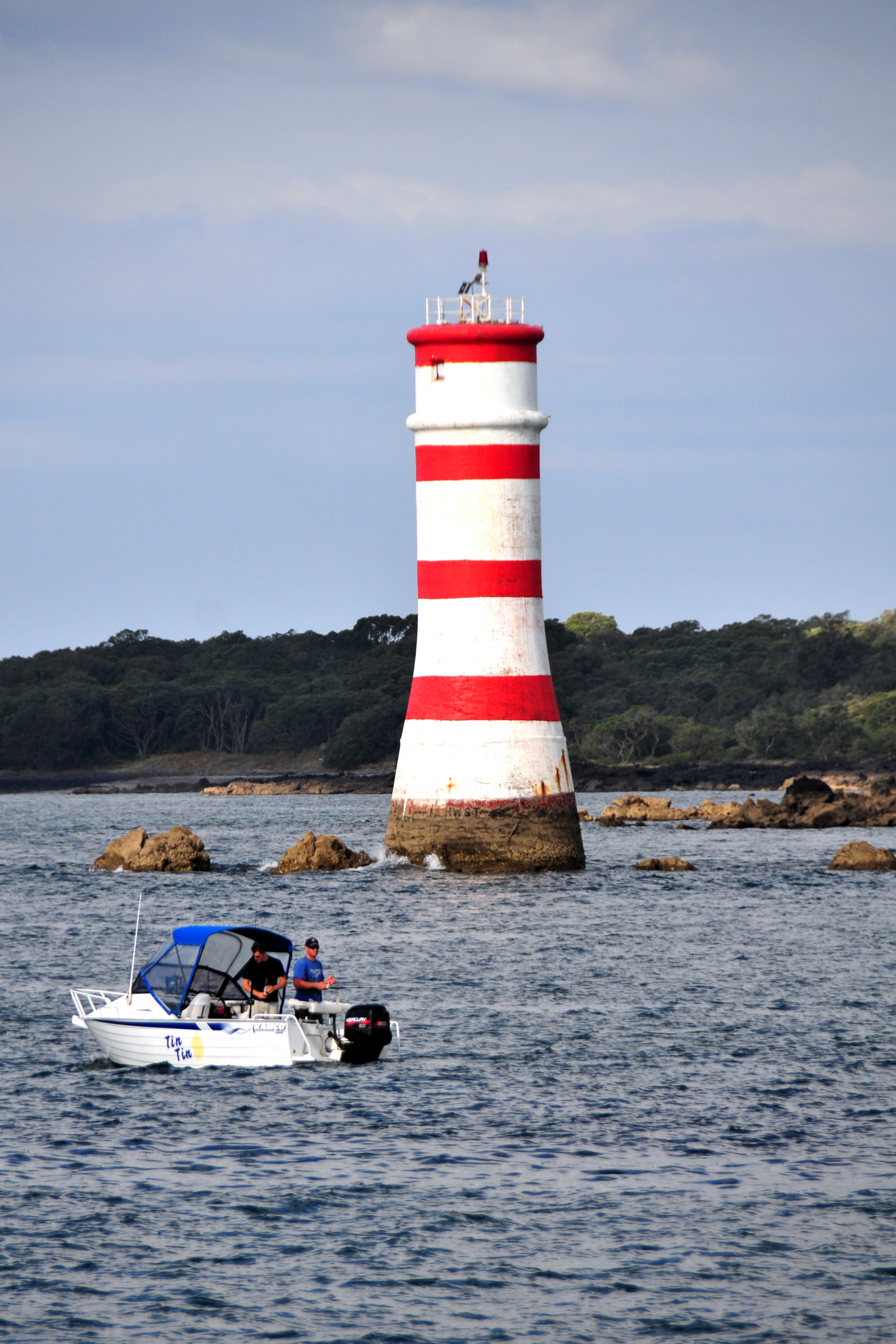
The Rangitoto Lighthouse

Rangitoto Lighthouse (also called Rangitoto Beacon) is a lighthouse off the coast in McKenzie Bay, in Auckland's Hauraki Gulf.

== History ==
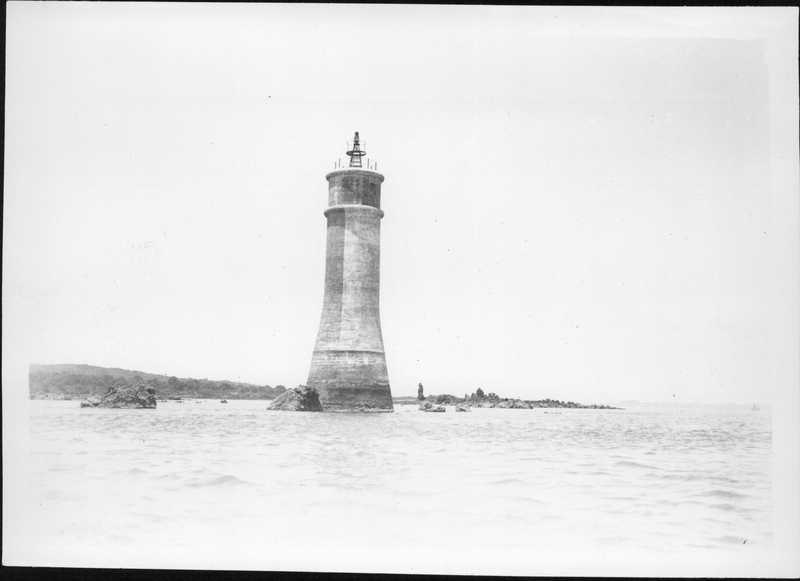
The Rangitoto Beacon in 1908

The lighthouse was built in 1882 and was constructed with cement from Warkworth. In 1905 a light was added for nighttime visibility.

== Description ==
Although not classed officially as a lighthouse by the New Zealand MSA, it does currently flash red every 12 seconds (also known as its character) and can be seen clearly from the southernmost of North Harbour's East Coast Bays. The beacon is red and white in colour, stands at 21 metres (69 feet) tall, and continues to run through solar power. The height of the focal plane is 21 metres (69 feet).

== See also ==
- List of lighthouses in New Zealand
