= List of lighthouses in New Zealand =

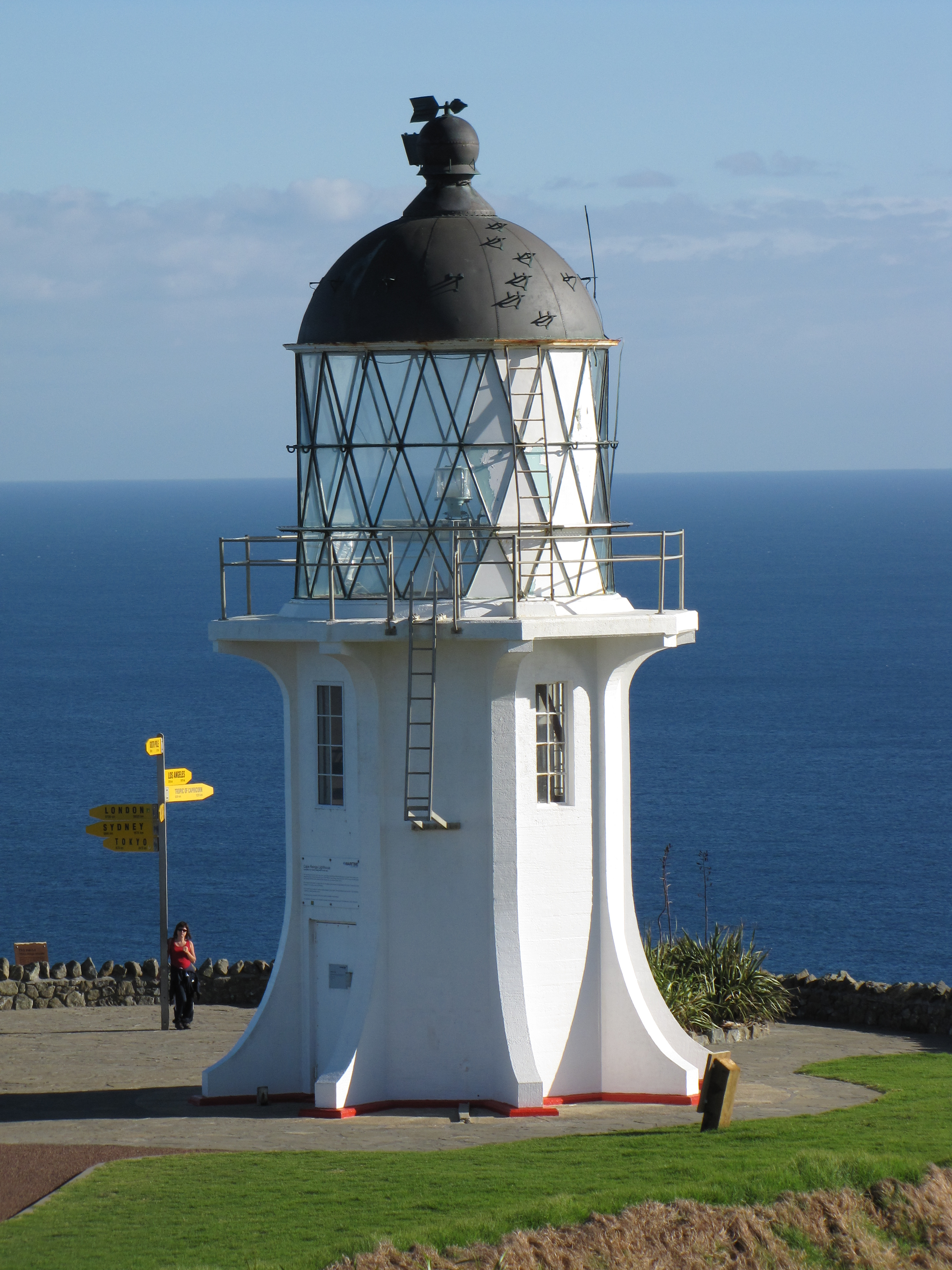
Cape Reinga Lighthouse

This is a list of lighthouses in New Zealand. Maritime New Zealand operates and maintains 23 active lighthouses and 74 light beacons. All of these lighthouses are fully automated and controlled by a central control room in Wellington.

Other lights, such as the Taiaroa Head and Bean Rock lighthouses, are operated by local port authorities. There are also several decommissioned lighthouses not listed below, including the Manukau South Head, Boulder Bank, and Akaroa lighthouses.

Many of New Zealand's earliest lighthouses were designed by marine engineer James Balfour and his successor John Blackett.

The New Zealand Nautical Almanac lists all of New Zealand's active lighthouses and lights, along with their locations, characteristics and ranges.

== North Island ==
Name	Coordinates	Year completed	Tower height	Status
Baring Head	41°25′S 174°52′E	1935	12m	Active
Cape Brett	35°10′S 174°20′E	1910	13m	Decommissioned
Bean Rock	36°50′S 174°50′E	1871	15m	Active
Cape Egmont	39°17′S 173°45′E	1881	20m	Active
Cape Palliser	41°37′S 175°17′E	1897	18m	Active
Cape Reinga	34°26′S 172°41′E	1941	10m	Active
Castle Point	40°54′S 176°14′E	1913	23m	Active
Cuvier Island	36°26′S 175°47′E	1889	15m	Active
East Cape	37°41′S 178°33′E	1900	14m	Active
Karori Rock	41°20'38"S 174°39'7"E	1915	16.5m	Decommissioned
Mokohinau Island	35°54′S 175°07′E	1883	14m	Active
Pencarrow Head	41°21′S 174°51′E	1859	11.5m	Decommissioned
Rangitoto	36°46′54″S 174°49′20″E	1905	21m	Active
Tiritiri Matangi	36°36′S 174°54′E	1865	20m	Active
Tongue Point			44m	Active

== South Island ==
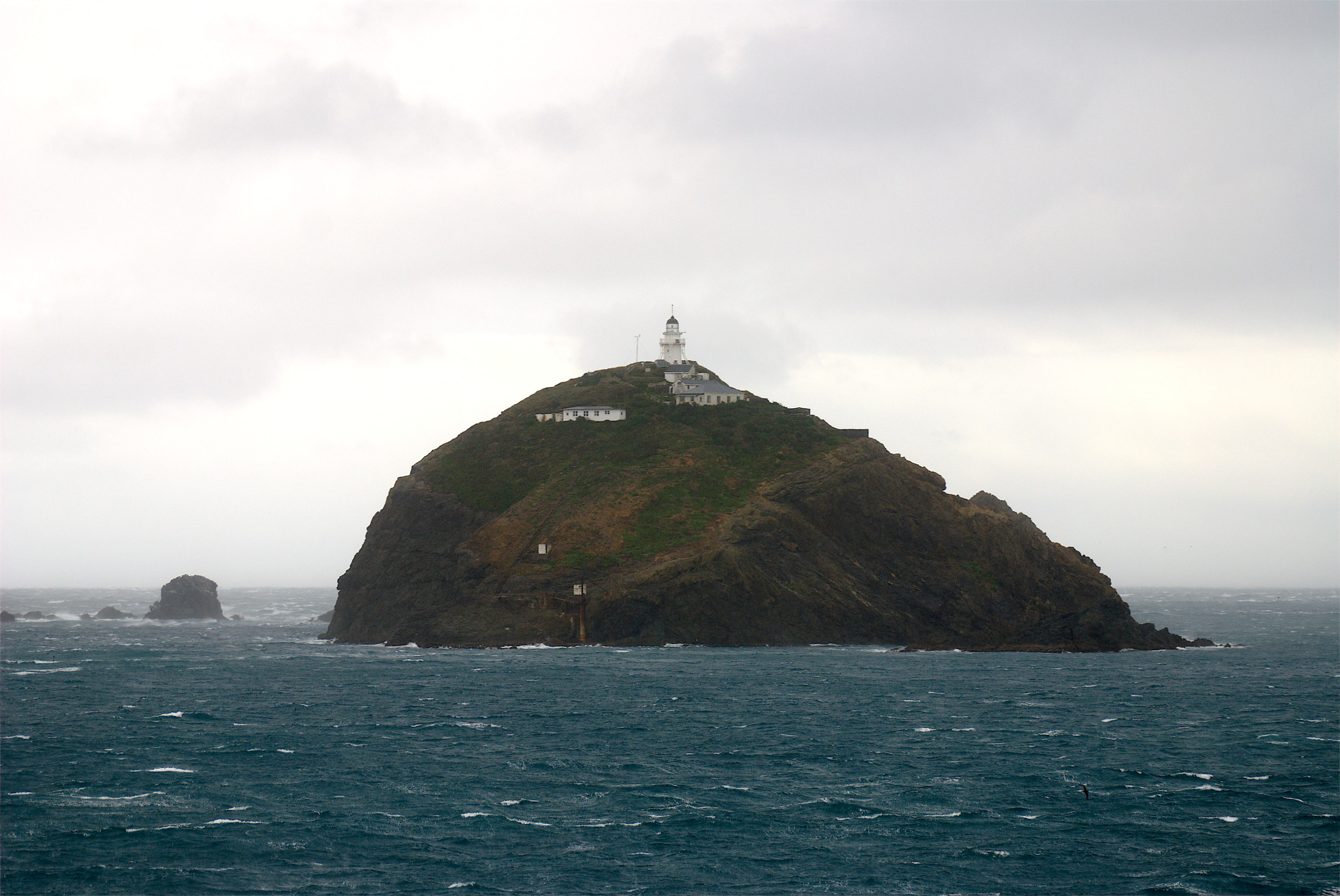
Brothers Island

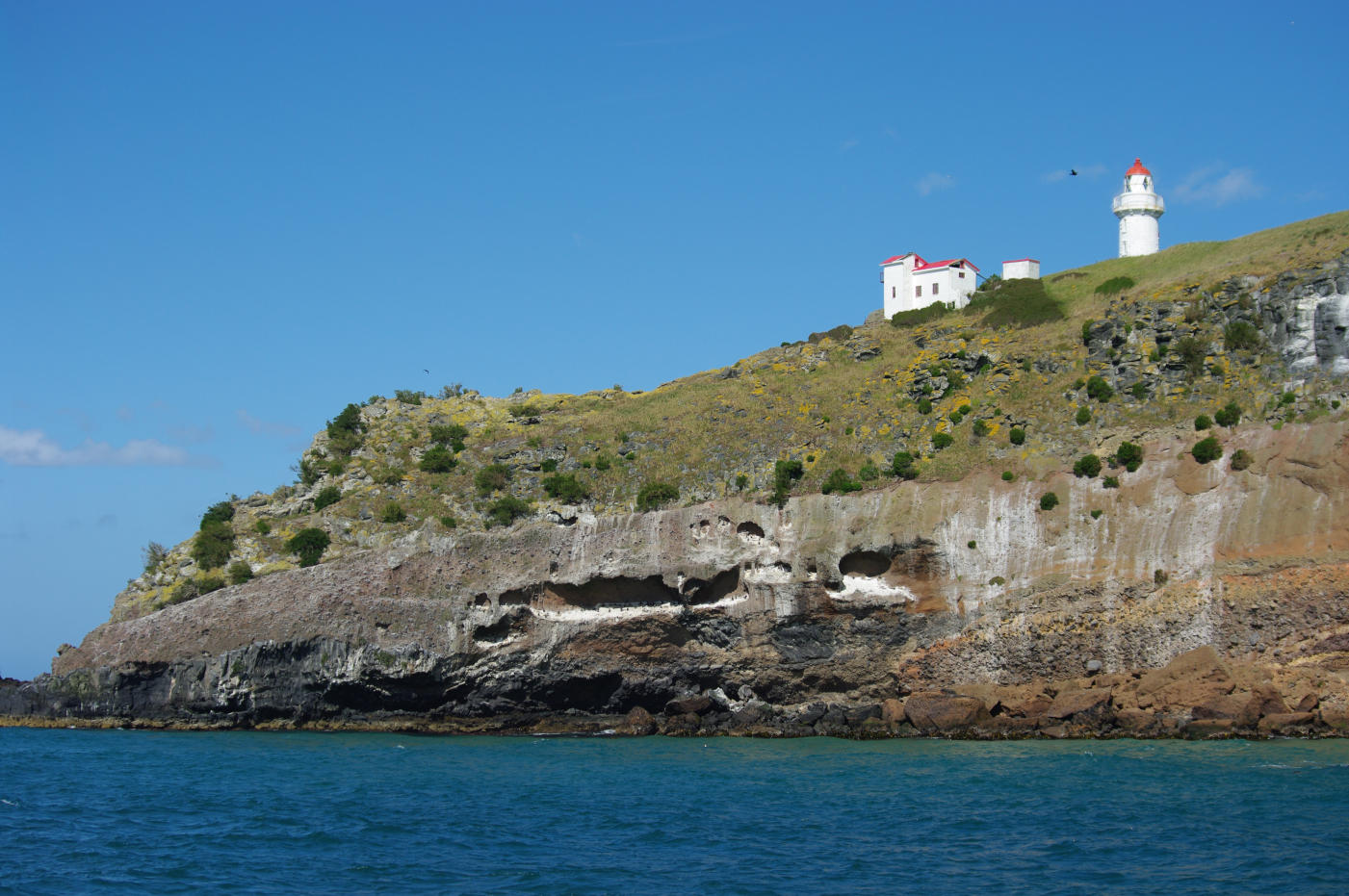
Tairaoa Head

Name	Coordinates	Year completed	Tower height	Status
Brothers Island	41°06′S 174°26′E	1877	12m	Active
French Pass	40°55′S 173°50′E	1884	3m	Active
Stephens Island	40°40′S 174°00′E	1894	15m	Active
Farewell Spit	40°33′S 173°00′E	1870	27m	Active
Kahurangi Point	40°47′S 172°13′E	1903	18m	Active
Cape Campbell	41°44′S 174°17′E	1870	22m	Active
Cape Foulwind	41°45′S 171°28′E	1876	9m	Active
Tuhawaiki Point	44°27′S 171°16′E	1904	9m	Active
Taiaroa Head	45°46′25″S 170°44′42.7″E	1865	12m	Active
Katiki Point	45°24′S 170°52′E	1878	8m	Active
Nugget Point	46°27′S 169°49′E	1870	9.4m	Active
Waipapa Point	46°40′S 168°51′E	1884	13m	Active
Dog Island	46°39′S 168°25′E	1865	37m	Active
Centre Island	46°28′S 167°51′E	1878	12m	Active
Puysegur Point	46°10′S 166°36′E	1879	5m	Active

== See also ==
- Lists of lighthouses and lightvessels
