= Waipapa Point Lighthouse =

Lighthouse in New Zealand

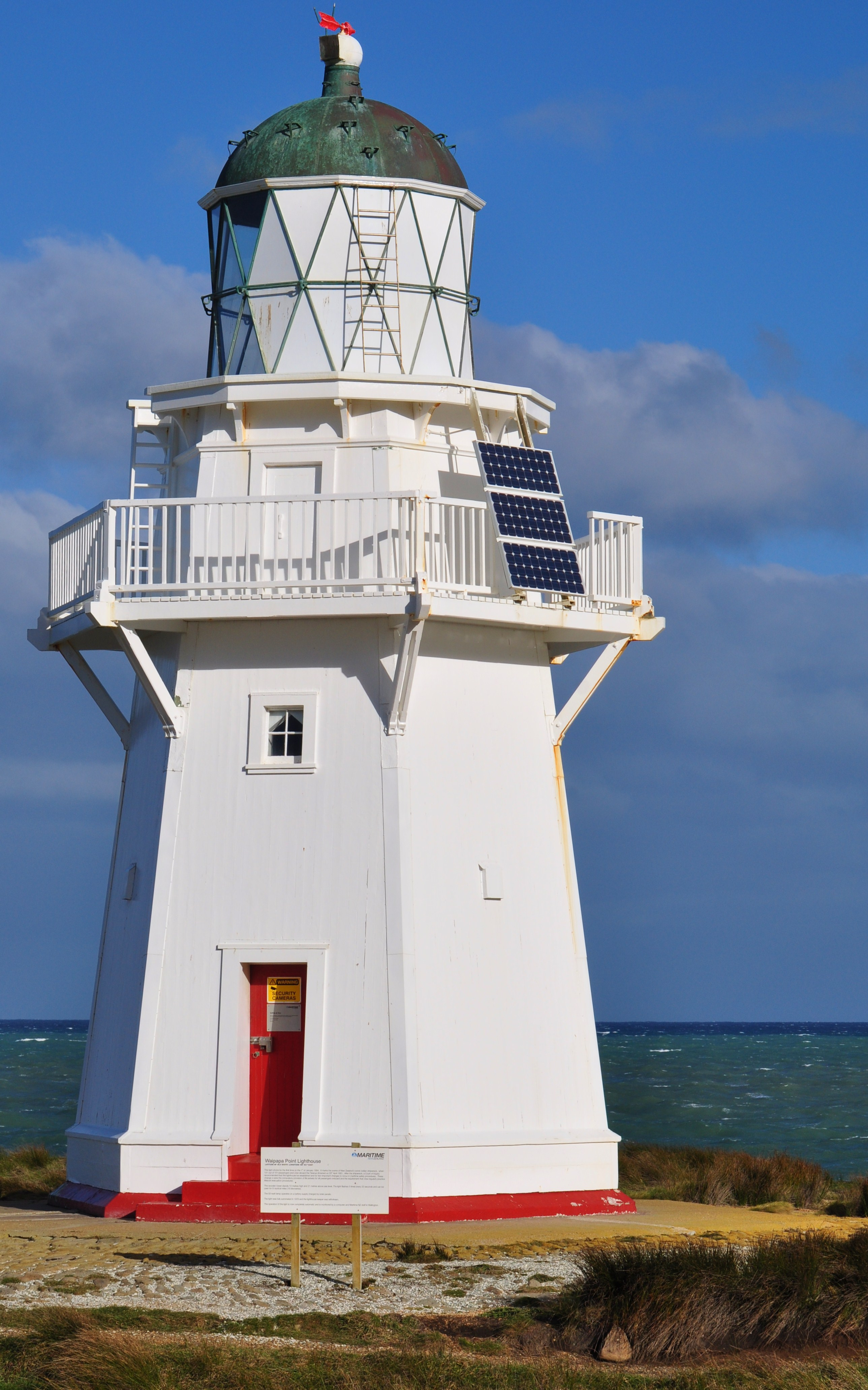
- Location: Waipapa Point; South Island; New Zealand
- Coordinates: 46°39′36″S 168°50′49″E

Tower
- Constructed: 1883
- Construction: wooden tower
- Automated: 1975
- Height: 13 metres (43 ft)
- Shape: hexagonal tower with balcony and lantern
- Markings: white tower, red trim, grey lantern dome
- Power source: solar power
- Operator: Maritime New Zealand

Light
- First lit: 1884
- Focal height: 21 metres (69 ft)
- Range: 9 nautical miles (17 km; 10 mi)
- Characteristic: Fl(5) W 20s.

Heritage New Zealand – Category 1
- Designated: 26 June 2009
- Reference no.: 7785

Waipapa Point Lighthouse is a lighthouse located at Waipapa Point, Southland, New Zealand. It was first lit on 1 January 1884.

On 29 April 1881, the passenger steamer Tararua was wrecked on a reef off Waipapa Point, and 131 people drowned. Sixty-four of the victims were buried at Waipapa Point in a burial ground known as the Tararua Acre. A Court of Inquiry held after the disaster made several recommendations, one of which was that a lighthouse should be built at Waipapa Point.

A site was selected, and construction of the lighthouse and homes for three lighthouse keepers began in December 1882. A second order flashing white light was ordered from England. The lighthouse was designed by the government's marine engineer John Blackett and was the second-to-last wooden lighthouse constructed in New Zealand (the last was the Kaipara North Head Lighthouse). The 13m high tower is hexagonal and double-skinned, made of kauri and totara with rock ballast filling the space between the inner and outer walls.

On 4 August 1883, while the lighthouse was still under construction, the Rotomahana struck the reef in the same spot as the Tararua had done. This prompted criticism of the length of time it was taking to build the lighthouse. The light was lit for the first time on 1 January 1884.

In 1943 the light was converted to electricity and connected to the National Grid. In 1976, the last lighthouse keeper left when the light was automated, and the lighthouse keeper's house and associated buildings and sheds were then demolished. The light was converted to solar power in 1988.

Restoration work conducted in 2008 ensured that the lighthouse was weatherproof and secure from vandalism. The lighthouse and Tararua Acre are designated as a Historic Place Category 1 by Heritage New Zealand.

== See also ==
- List of lighthouses in New Zealand
