= Castle Point Lighthouse =

Lighthouse in New Zealand

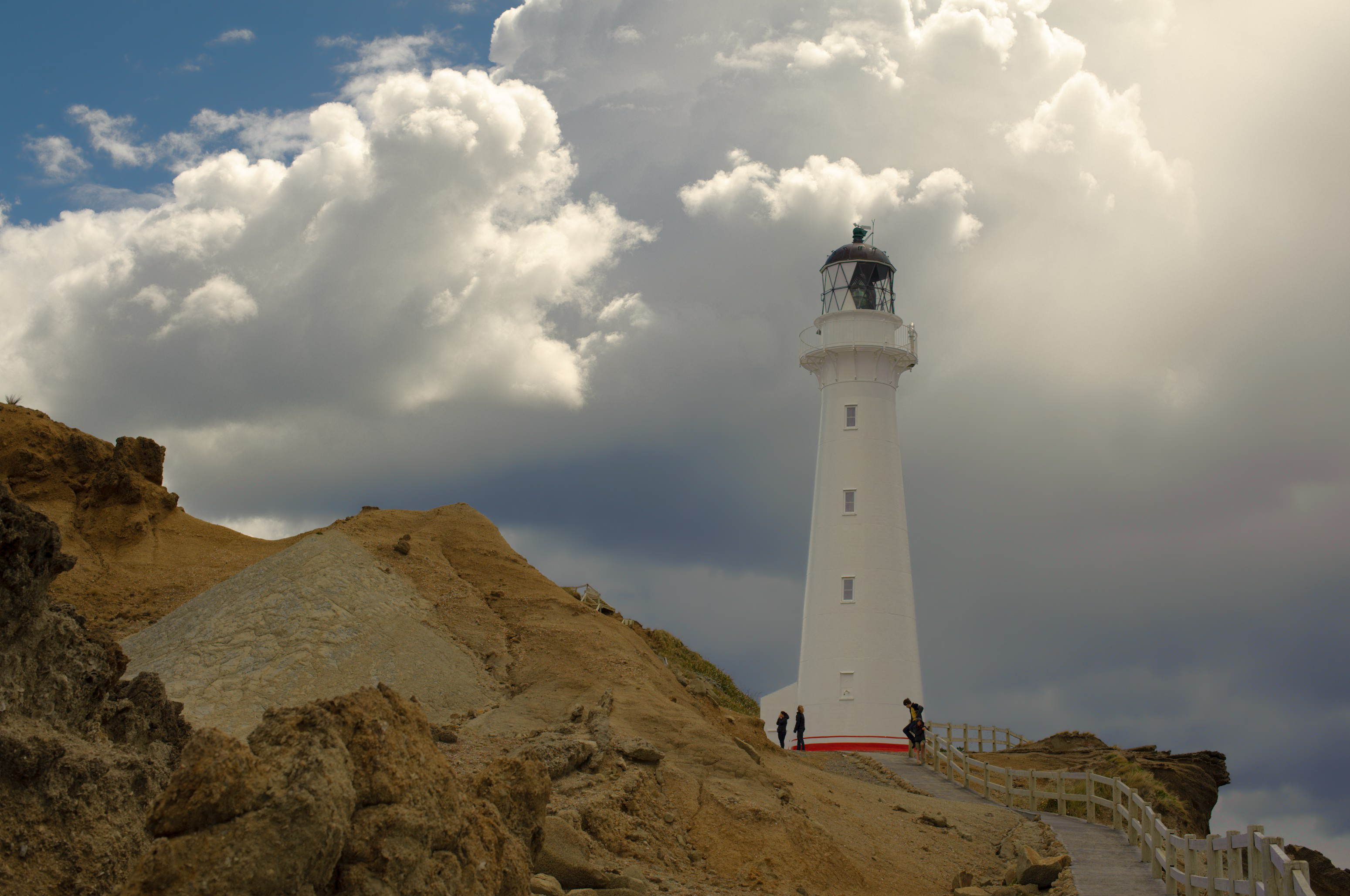
- Location: Castlepoint; North Island; New Zealand
- Coordinates: 40°54′01.5″S 176°13′53.2″E

Tower
- Constructed: 1913
- Foundation: concrete
- Construction: cast iron tower
- Automated: 1988
- Height: 23 metres (75 ft)
- Shape: tapered cylindrical tower with balcony and lantern
- Markings: white tower, gray lantern dome
- Power source: mains electricity
- Operator: Maritime New Zealand

Light
- First lit: 1913
- Focal height: 52 metres (171 ft)
- Lens: 2nd order catadiopteric
- Range: 26 nautical miles (48 km; 30 mi)
- Characteristic: Fl (3) W 30s.

Castle Point Lighthouse, located near the village of Castlepoint in the Wellington Region of the North Island of New Zealand, is the North Island's tallest lighthouse standing 52 metres above sea level and is one of only two left in New Zealand still lit by the original rotating fresnel lens. It is owned and operated by Maritime New Zealand.

== History ==
The light was built in 1913 and was originally fuelled by oil. It was officially lit for the first time on Sunday 12 January 1913, sending out a triple flash every 45 seconds that could be seen for 35 kilometres. In 1954 the oil lamp was replaced with an electric incandescent lamp powered by a local diesel generator. This was subsequently replaced by a connection to the mains grid in 1961. The nearby Castlepoint beach is popular with holiday makers and the lighthouse itself became a popular tourist attraction, acquiring the nickname "The Holiday Light".

The light was fully automated in 1988 and is monitored 24/7 by Maritime NZ in Wellington.

== See also ==
- List of lighthouses in New Zealand
