= Cuvier Island =

Island in New Zealand

Repanga (Māori)
- Location within New Zealand

Geography
- Coordinates: 36°26′S 175°46′E
- Area: 1.95 km^{2} (0.75 sq mi)
- Highest elevation: 214 m (702 ft)

Administration
- New Zealand

Cuvier Island is a small uninhabited island off the east coast of the North Island of New Zealand. It lies on the seaward end of the Colville Channel, 15 km (9.3 mi) north of the Mercury Islands and approximately 23 km (14 mi) south-east of Great Barrier Island. The 195 ha (480 acres) island is a wildlife sanctuary, managed by the Department of Conservation and is the subject of an ongoing island restoration project to eliminate non-native mammals and restore the original ecosystem. It is also the location of the Cuvier Island Lighthouse which was constructed in 1889 and the wreck of the old HMNZS Philomel which was scuttled near the island on 6 August 1949 after decommissioning and being stripped of useful equipment. As part of the Treaty of Waitangi settlement process the island will be vested to Ngāti Maru, Ngāti Tamaterā, Ngaati Whanaunga and Ngāti Hei who will vest it back seven days later to the Crown for the public.

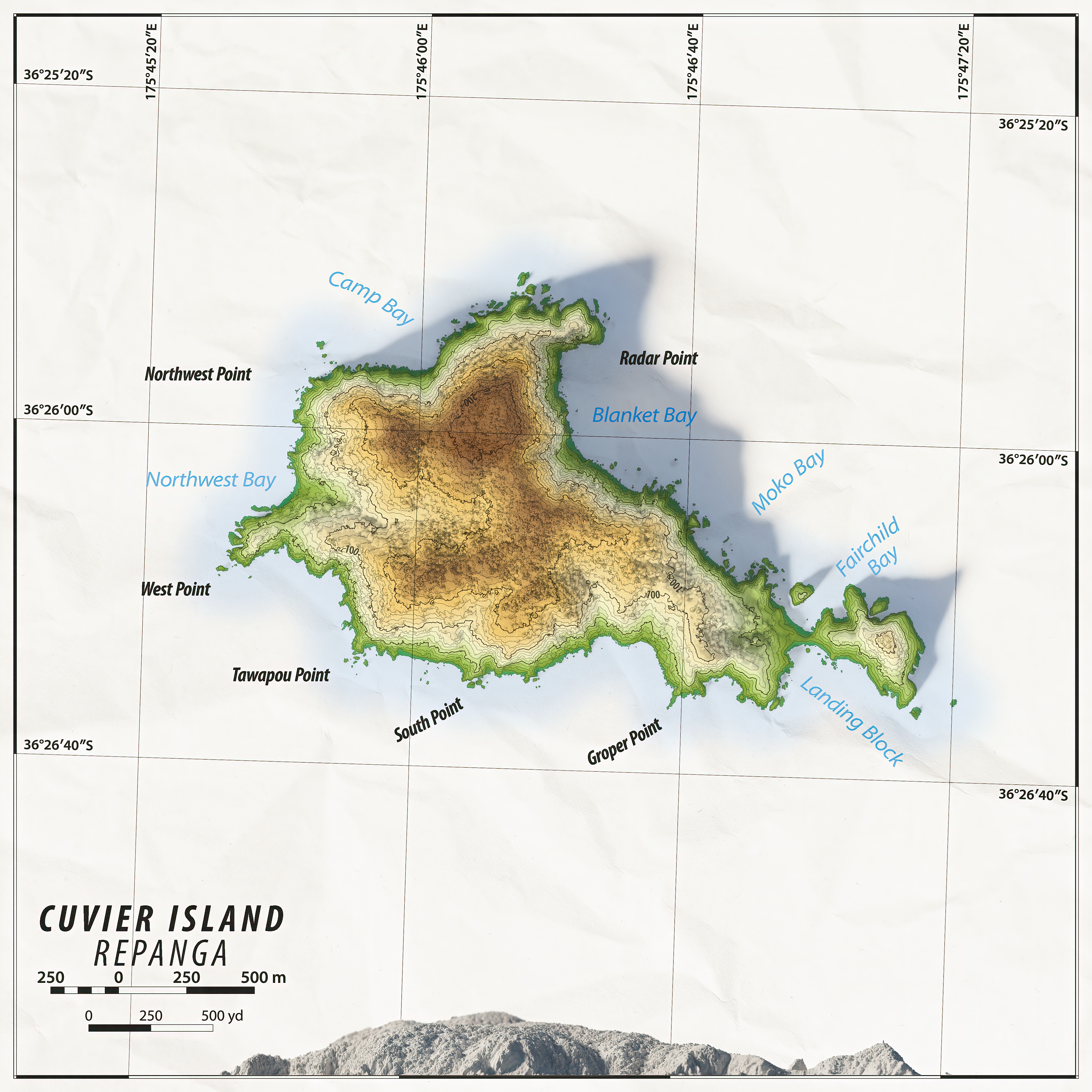
Topographic map of Cuvier Island

== Geology ==
The island is the remains of an igneous intrusion of the Coromandel Volcanic Zone, which formed during the Miocene between 17 and 16 million years ago.

== Important Bird Area ==
The island has been identified as an Important Bird Area by BirdLife International because of its small breeding colony of vulnerable Pycroft's petrels.

== Name ==
The Māori name of the island is Repanga. The name Cuvier was given by D'Urville, naming it after Baron Cuvier.

== See also ==
- New Zealand outlying islands
- List of islands of New Zealand
- List of islands
- Desert island
