= Bean Rock Lighthouse =

Lighthouse in New Zealand

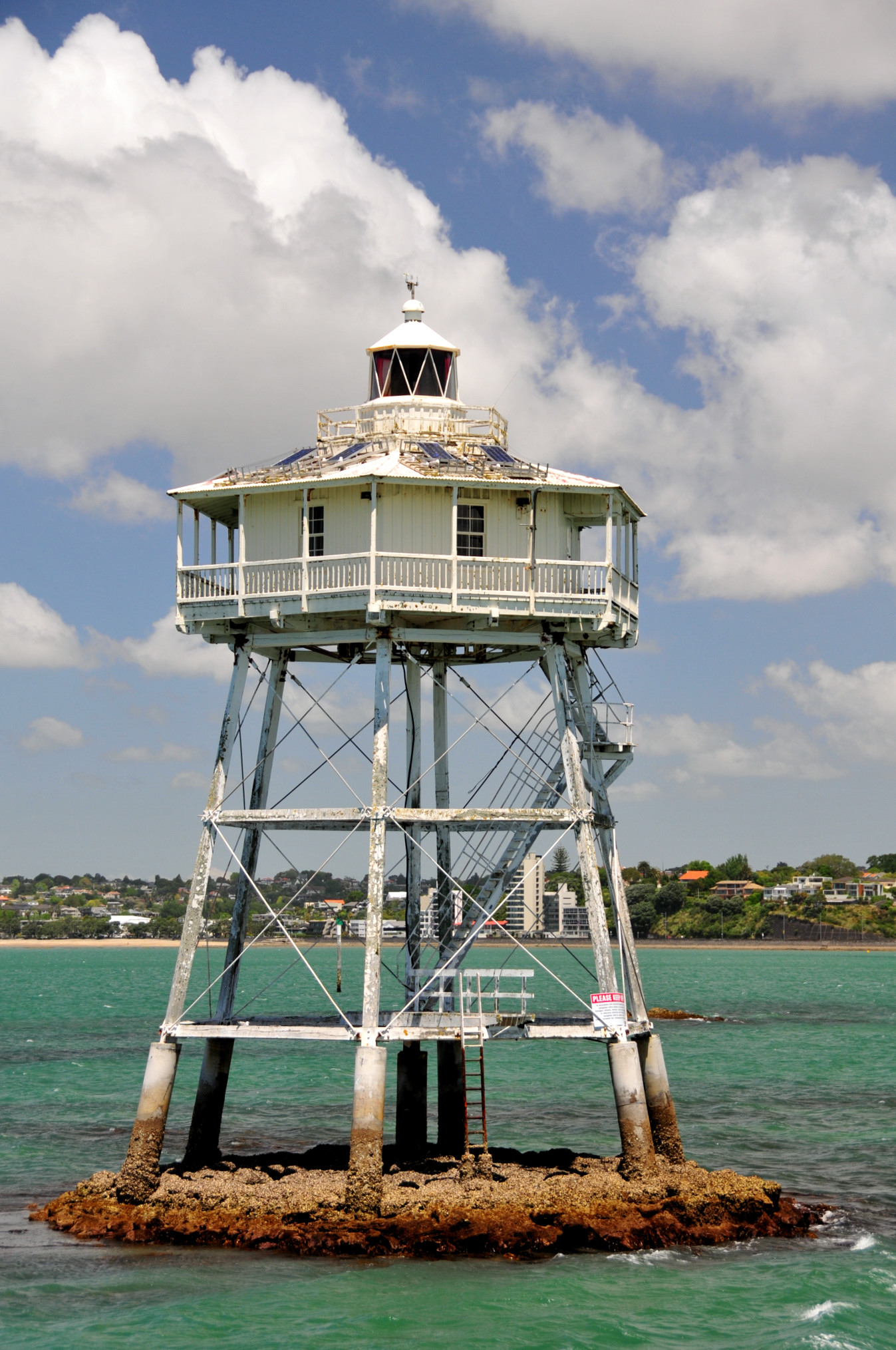
- Bean Rock in 2010
- Location: Waitemata Harbour; Auckland; New Zealand
- Coordinates: 36°50′00″S 174°49′52″E

Tower
- Constructed: 1871
- Construction: timber legs, hexagonal wooden cottage
- Automated: 1912
- Height: 15 m (49 ft)
- Markings: white
- Power source: solar power
- Operator: Ports of Auckland

Light
- First lit: 24 July 1871
- Focal height: 15 m (49 ft)
- Range: 14 nmi (26 km; 16 mi) (white), 11 nmi (20 km; 13 mi) (red)
- Characteristic: Fl WR 8s, Fl(3) WR 8s

Heritage New Zealand – Category 1
- Designated: 21 September 1989
- Reference no.: 3295

Bean Rock Lighthouse is a lighthouse situated at the end of a reef in the Waitematā Harbour in Auckland, New Zealand. It is the only remaining example in New Zealand of a wooden cottage-style lighthouse, and it is one of only a few remaining worldwide. It is also the oldest wooden lighthouse and only wave-washed tower in New Zealand. It is owned, operated and maintained by Ports of Auckland.

== History ==
The rocks were named Te Toka-o-Kapetaua by Māori, after Te Patukirikiri ancestor Kapetaua was abandoned on the rocks by his brother-in-law Tarakumukumu. The European name, Bean Rock, was chosen in 1840, and named after Royal Navy Lieutenant P.C.D. Bean of HMS Herald, the master of the ship that carried out the first harbour survey of the Waitematā after the founding of the township of Auckland.

Bean Rock lighthouse was built c. 1870 at a cost of 3,000 pounds and was first lit on 24 July 1871, using a kerosene lamp of 350 candlepower. The location had been recommended by James Balfour and he did the early conceptual design work but was drowned in an accident before the design was completed. His design work was finished by James Stewart.

Bean Rock was inhabited by lighthouse keepers and their families until 1912, when it was automated and the keepers were withdrawn. The lighthouse keeper from 1909 to 1911, James Anderson, kept in contact with his family by sending Morse code messages by torch-light to his son who lived in Devonport. In 1936, cable was laid from the Ōrākei wharf to the lighthouse and the light was run by electricity. At the time, the beacon had a distinctive signalling sequence and a coloured light display to indicate the correct course to shipping in the channel.

By the 1980s, the lighthouse was in poor condition due to corroded iron fittings and rotting kauri beams. Because of this, the Auckland Harbour Board decided that the lighthouse should be replaced with a religious sculpture or other significant piece of artwork. The board later decided to keep the lighthouse due to the historical significance, and began to restore the structure. In 1985, the lighthouse was restored, with new timber legs being sunk into new concrete foundations. In the mid-1990s, the lighthouse was converted to solar power and synchronised with an automatic foghorn.

Bean Rock lighthouse is listed under the Historic Places Act by Heritage New Zealand as a Category I Historic Place (number 3295). As it is a working lighthouse, it is not open to the public.

== Gallery ==
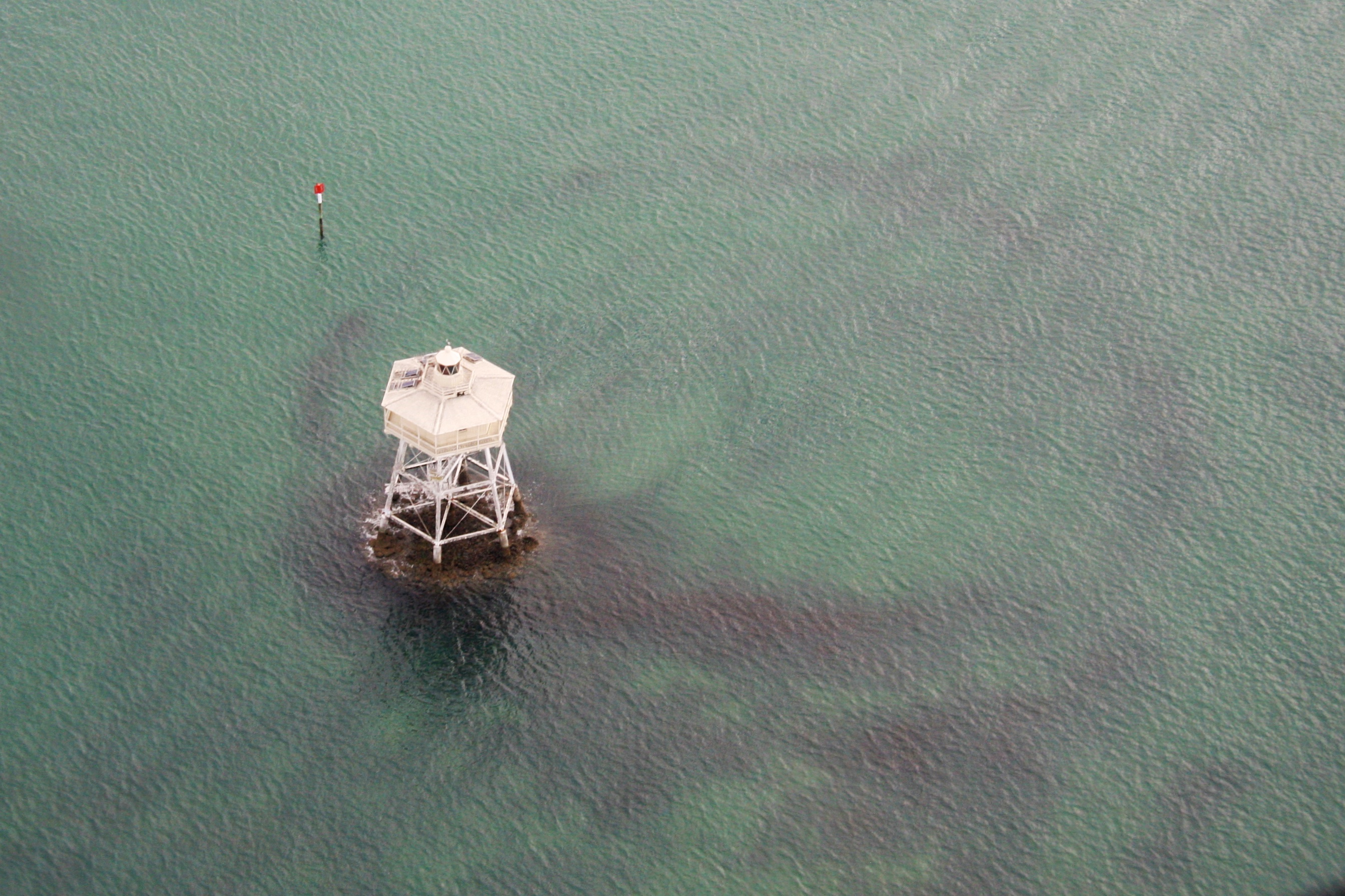
Aerial view of the lighthouse

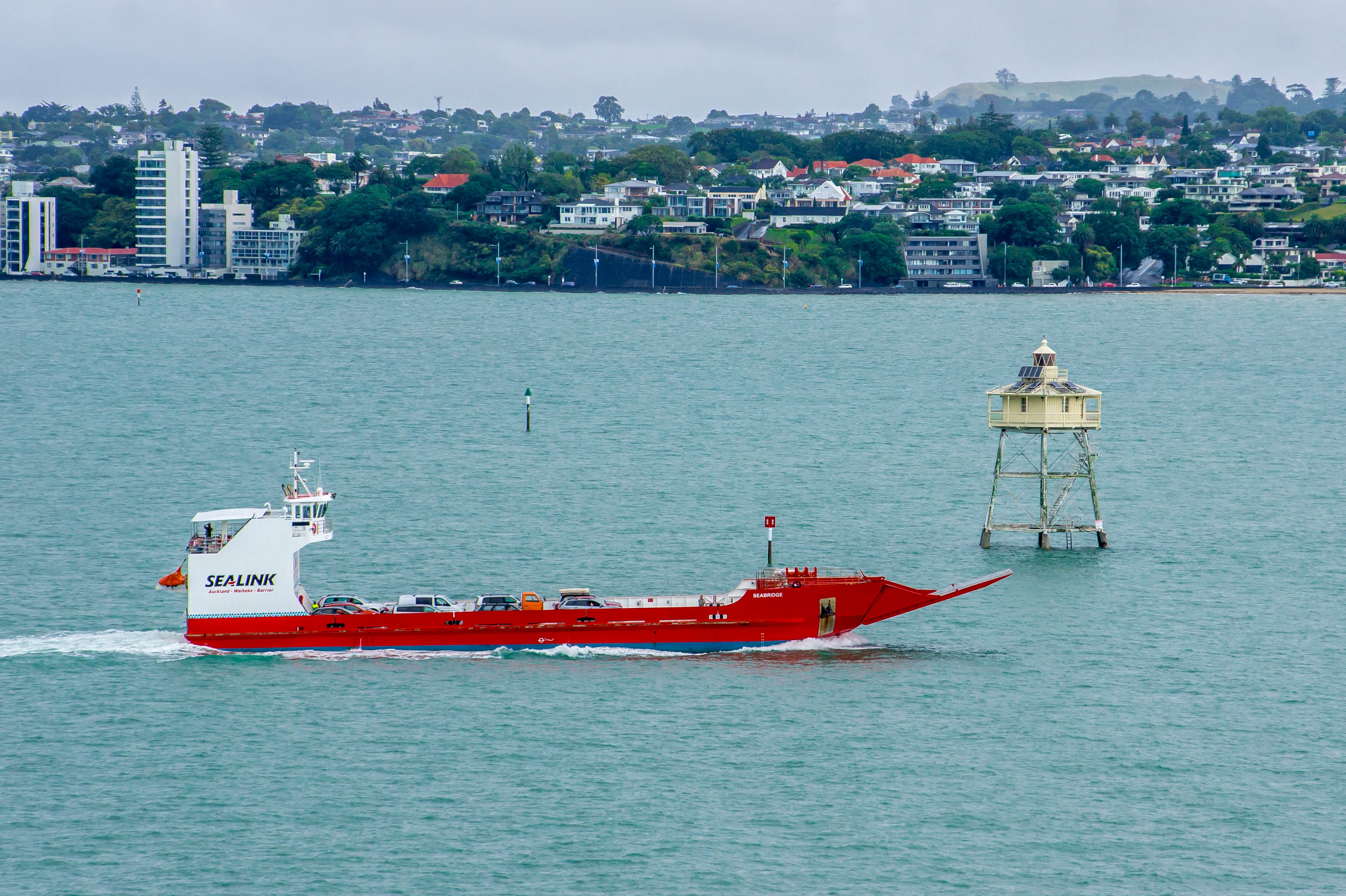
Bean Rock lighthouse with Mission Bay in the background

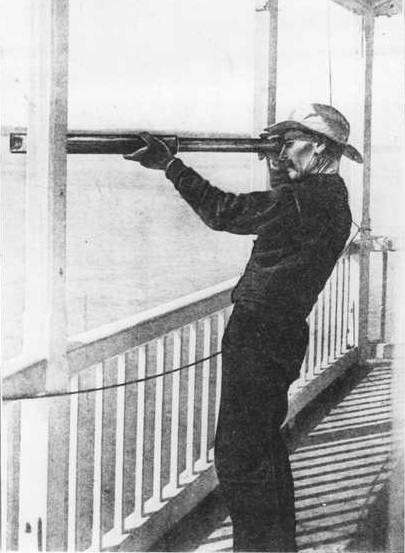
Lighthouse keeper James Anderson in 1910

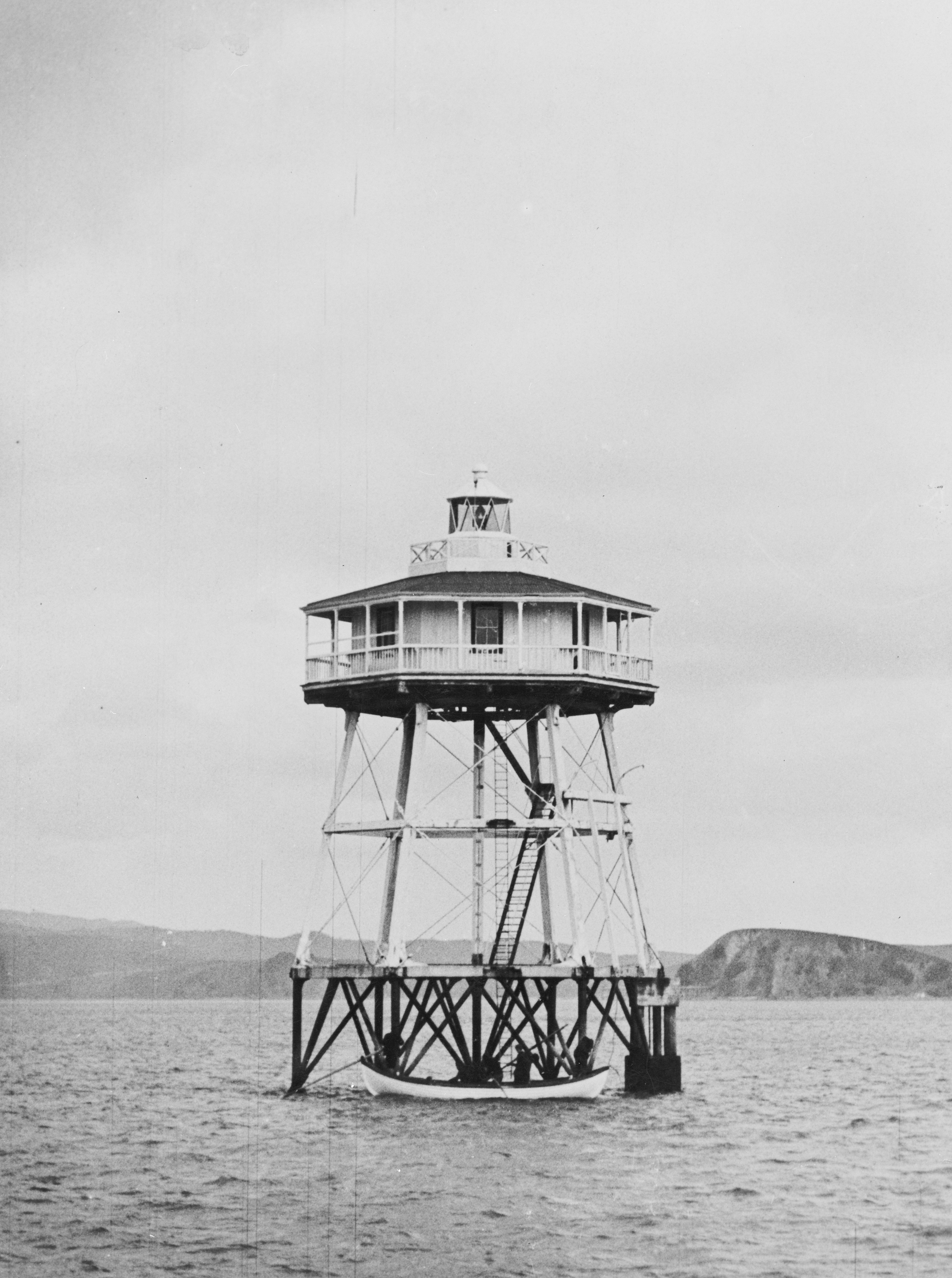
The former Ponui Passage Lighthouse, near Ponui Island, had the same design as Bean Rock lighthouse and was also completed in 1871

== See also ==
- List of lighthouses in New Zealand
