= Royal New Zealand Coastguard =

Primary marine search and rescue organisation in New Zealand

Coastguard Tautiaki Moana
- Nickname: Coastguard
- Formation: 1976
- Type: Charitable organisation
- Purpose: Maritime search and rescue
- Headquarters: Level 2; 3 Solent Street; Mechanics Bay; Auckland; New Zealand
- Region served: New Zealand
- Chief Executive Officer: Carl McOnie
- Staff: 100+ paid staff
- Volunteers: 2,000+ active volunteers
- Website: www.coastguard.nz

The Royal New Zealand Coastguard (informally Coastguard) is the primary civilian marine search and rescue organisation for New Zealand. Unlike a number of other countries, the organisation is a non-governmental, civilian charitable organisation, with no enforcement powers. Uniformed agencies of the New Zealand government, including the police, Maritime New Zealand and customs, manage New Zealand's maritime law enforcement and border control. Coastguard in New Zealand is instead dedicated to search and rescue, education and community engagement.

== History ==
Sea rescue services have existed in some shape or form in New Zealand since at least 1861, but it was not until the 1970s that the modern Coastguard was formed.

=== 1970s ===
- Following tragic events such as the Wahine disaster, various local groups that had been operating separately recognised a need for a unified, national organisation and so they formed the "New Zealand Coastguard Federation" in 1976.
- Units began offering training and education to local boaties in an effort to reduce incidents since at least 1979.

=== 1980s ===
- Radio communications are introduced and play a large part in assisting with search and rescue events.
- Name changes to "Royal New Zealand Coastguard Federation" in 1986 as the charity is granted royal patronage, with Prince Charles as the Patron.

=== 1990s ===
- First Air Patrol unit is introduced in 1991 which means that for the first time in New Zealand survivors would be able to be seen from the sky as a part of Coastguard search and rescue incidents.
- "Nowcasting" service was introduced in Auckland in 1992. This was different from simply broadcasting a forecast as weather measuring instruments had also been installed. This was later rolled out through the rest of the country.

=== 2000s ===
- Dropped "Federation" from the name in 2005.
- Began charging a call-out rate per-hour to non-members in 2006.
- Calls were made for government funding in 2007.
- Law changes were passed in 2008 requiring Auckland councils to provide funding for, among other things, including Coastguard Northern Region. For more info, see Auckland Regional Amenities Funding Act 2008.
- On July 1, 2020, Coastguard's four regional entities and the national office merged.
- On August 14, 2021, Coastguard was gifted an ingoa Māori, ‘Tautiaki Moana’ by Te Arawa iwi at Te Papaiouru Marae in Rotorua.

== Organisation ==
Coastguard in New Zealand is a civilian charity made up of volunteers and staff, with 63 volunteer units located around the country.

=== Incident types ===
The type of incident will influence a number of factors, such as who is in control of the incident and who will pay for the incident. Other organisations may also become involved in an incident including:

- New Zealand Defence Force
- Fire and Emergency New Zealand
- NZ Land Search & Rescue
- Civil Aviation Authority

==== Category 1 (New Zealand Police) ====
Some examples of a Category 1 incident are:

- Person on-board vessel is overdue
- Death near shore
- Usually on-land or within a few miles of the shore

Typically require the use of local personnel and resources and can be carried out efficiently and effectively at the local level.

==== Category 2 (Rescue Coordination Centre New Zealand) ====
Some examples of a Category 2 incident are:

- Marine EPIRB (beacon) activated
- Plane crash
- May be coordinated internationally or several miles off the shore

==== Coastguard non-emergency assistance ====
Coastguard also provides non-urgent assistance within 12 nautical miles of the coast and 30 miles of a Coastguard unit, such as breakdown assistance, at no additional cost to members. Coastguard membership is $150 per year (as of 2025). However, this non-urgent assistance is chargeable for non-members. The current rate is $350 per hour (from the time the rescue vessel leaves the dock until the time it arrives back). The costs incurred for emergency services provided by Coastguard are covered by Police or Rescue Coordination Centre, not the person in distress.

=== Vision, mission and strategic goals ===
Coastguard's vision is that “with our support, everyone can enjoy Aotearoa’s New Zealand’s waters safely and with confidence”, with the mission of “saving lives on the water.”

Across Coastguard's three pillars – Search and Rescue, Communications and Education & Community Engagement, the organisation has three key strategic goals:

1. Having the right people, in the right place to respond to a call from help.
2. Giving our people the support they need to enable them to focus on the mission.
3. Having the right tools and equipment to complete the mission safely and effectively.

== Personnel ==
Volunteers largely make up the organisation, alongside paid staff. In 2024, there was 2,000+ volunteers and 100+ paid staff. Volunteers undertake a large number of different roles within units, both on-shore and as SAR crew.

=== Becoming a volunteer ===
Many Coastguard units require volunteers. Interested people can apply on the dedicated Coastguard recruitment website. Applicants need to pass a "police vet". This is more stringent than just a regular criminal convictions check as crew may work with vulnerable people.

=== SAR Crew ===
Units require people to attend search and rescue events as they may arise.

==== Rescue Vessel Crew ====
Involves being a crew member on board a Coastguard Rescue Vessel (CRV). There are many roles on board, including helmsperson, navigator / radio operator, observer and skipper.

==== Air Patrol Crew ====
Involves being an air observer or tactical officer. The air patrol typically involves small planes.

==== Shore Crew ====
These roles involve contributing to a Unit by applying skills in administration, organising, planning, repairs, working with figures, social media, or general support, both on and off the water during rescue missions.

==== Radio Operator ====
Communicates with vessels on the water, including rescues vessels (as well as the public). This role requires the crew member to hold a Maritime VHF Radio Operator Certificate. The role involves logging trip reports from water users, communicating vital information over marine radio, handling public calls for marine emergencies and on-water assistance, providing a communication link between Coastguard shore teams and on-water rescue crews, and working closely with other agencies like the Police, Ambulance, Fire, and the local Harbourmaster.

==== Incident Controller ====
Coordinates search and rescues operations. The role is suited to someone who has previous people management experience. This role is especially important when working with other agencies, in which case the Coordinated Information Management System (CIMS) is used.

== Equipment ==
=== Boats ===
Sumner Lifeboat, part of the Sumner Unit based in Sumner, Christchurch

All units operate small, medium and large marine rescue vessels, mostly over nine metres but depending on the place they could have smaller vessels. They are specially equipped with rescue equipment, such as:

- Life rings
- Medical Kit
- Oxygen Kit
- Defibrillators
- Boat hooks
- Throw bags
- Radar, compass and GPS

=== Aircraft ===
Today two Air Patrol units exist under the Coastguard banner presently, Auckland Air Patrol and Northland Air Patrol, both operating their own Cessna 182 dedicated to Coastguard service. Together, they responded to 53 calls for assistance and assisted 96 people in 2023/24. Previously an Air Patrol existed in the South Island. This has now been disestablished due to a lack of funding. Assistance is still able to be provided in the event of an emergency to the South Island but this is now typically provided by helicopters based out of Christchurch.

=== Uniforms ===
Crew members are provided with a distinctive red uniform that is suitable for challenging marine conditions. Some of the clothing includes:

- Wet weather jacket
- Overalls
- Life jacket
- Sea boots
- Marine grab bag (backpack)

== Services ==
=== Marine VHF radio ===
A number of services are provided by Coastguard via. marine VHF radio. The person operating the VHF radio is required to hold a Maritime VHF Radio Operator Certificate (unless they are under supervision by someone who holds one or they are making an emergency call). To contact Coastguard you can call them on Coastguard Radio on a VHF radio, refer to their website. All emergency calls should be made on marine VHF channel 16. The channel is monitored by the Rescue Coordination Centre New Zealand and the Coastguard Operations Centres. Nearby vessels are also encouraged to listen on the channel for any distress calls.

==== Marine Weather ====
Provides up-to-date marine weather for all of New Zealand. This is also known as "nowcasting". The channels used for the Marine Weather service are available on the Coastguard website.

==== Trip Reports and Bar Crossing ====
Provides ability to lodge a trip report. It is a good idea to do a trip report when departing on the water and when crossing a bar. You should always remember to close your trip report when you arrive back safely or when you cross the bar. In the event that an alarm is raised, search and rescue teams will have information available to assist them with the rescue. The channels used for the Trip Reports service are available on the Coastguard website. The information collected includes:

- Boat name and callsign
- Where you are travelling to
- Number of People on board (POB)
- When you plan to arrive

=== Education ===
Coastguard is the leading provider of boating courses throughout New Zealand, offering courses to suit all abilities, types of boating and training pathways. Many courses are offered with a number being NZQA-accredited. Some of the most popular courses include:

- Day Skipper
- Boatmaster
- Maritime VHF Radio Operator Certificate
- Maritime Restricted Radio Operator Certificate (MRROC)

More information is available on the Coastguard website.

=== Free Coastguard App ===
Available on platforms such as Android and iOS, there is a free Coastguard application available to download, this application can give you access to be able to log a trip with Coastguard without having to call Coastguard Radio over the phone or on the VHF radio. It can also give the weather information for your local area and give you other information such as Coastguard Radio map. It also can provide tidal information and allow you to plot locations on a map for memory, for an example fishing spots, etc.

=== Old4New lifejacket upgrade programme ===
As part of a water safety campaign, Coastguard conducts a programme where old, and oftentimes unserviceable, lifejackets can be replaced at a lower cost than the retail price. More information is available on the Old4New website.

== Statistics ==
=== Financials ===
In the 2023/24 financial year, Coastguard received $30m in income and had $30.7m in expenses.

==== Income ($30m in 2023/24) ====
- 49% Grants
- 18% Membership
- 10% Lottery ticket sales
- 9% Donations received
- 6% Interest received & other income
- 4% Regional grants
- 4% Examination fees

==== Expenses ($30.7m in 2023/24) ====
- Search & rescue 83.02%
- Communications 4.59%
- Education & community engagement 12.39%

=== Volunteer statistics ===
Year	Number of volunteers	Volunteer hours	Incidents responded to	People brought home safely
2024	2048	303048	2867	7196
2023	2001	273269	2596	6300
2022	1963	261000	3298	7939
2021	1978	291402	3553	8618
2020	2109	276309	2995	6054
2019	1988	291482	2899	6774
2018	2042	291235	3037	6951
2017	2052	309367	2702	6797
2016	2235	308733	2475	6489
2015	2240	302453	2646	6828
2014	2326	315234	2849	7334
2013	2432	307445	3127	7088
2012	2398	363108	3339	6634
2011	2224	348356	3337	6996

== In the media ==
=== 2016 ===
- Coastguard rescues drunks from island after party of 500 gets out of hand
- "Boat capsizes off Northland coast". The New Zealand Herald. Archived from the original on 3 January 2017.
- Pair rescued from troubled boat listing in darkness on Lake Taupo

=== 2020 ===
- Six rescued by Coastguard after waka ama breaks apart in Northland | Newshub

=== 2021 ===
- "Kayaker saved after incident on Whanganui River". The New Zealand Herald.

=== 2022 ===
- Coastguard NZ warns boaties to ensure they are up to date with changing sea conditions | RNZ News
- "Five fishermen rescued near Kawau Island after boat capsizes". The New Zealand Herald.
- "Father and son survive hours in the water after boat capsizes in Firth of Thames, lives saved by lifejackets". The New Zealand Herald.

=== 2023 ===
- Trio rescued from boat amid 'adverse' winds, swells off Hawke's Bay (1news.co.nz)
- "Coastguard Maketū rescues two from water following jetski capsize". The New Zealand Herald.
- "Man rescued after being swept overboard when large wave hit chartered fishing boat near Raglan". newshub.co.nz. Archived from the original on 4 January 2024.

=== 2024 ===
- "Three men rescued from abandoned boat near Hen and Chicken islands, Whangārei". The New Zealand Herald.
- "Riverton boat tragedy: Coastguard volunteer says survivor plucked from capsized boat, deceased trapped under vessel". The New Zealand Herald.
- 'We’re really sorry': Coastguard skipper on attempted rescue of 3 fishermen (1news.co.nz)

== See also ==
- Rescue Coordination Centre New Zealand
- Maritime New Zealand
