= Cape Egmont =

Point in New Zealand

- Cape
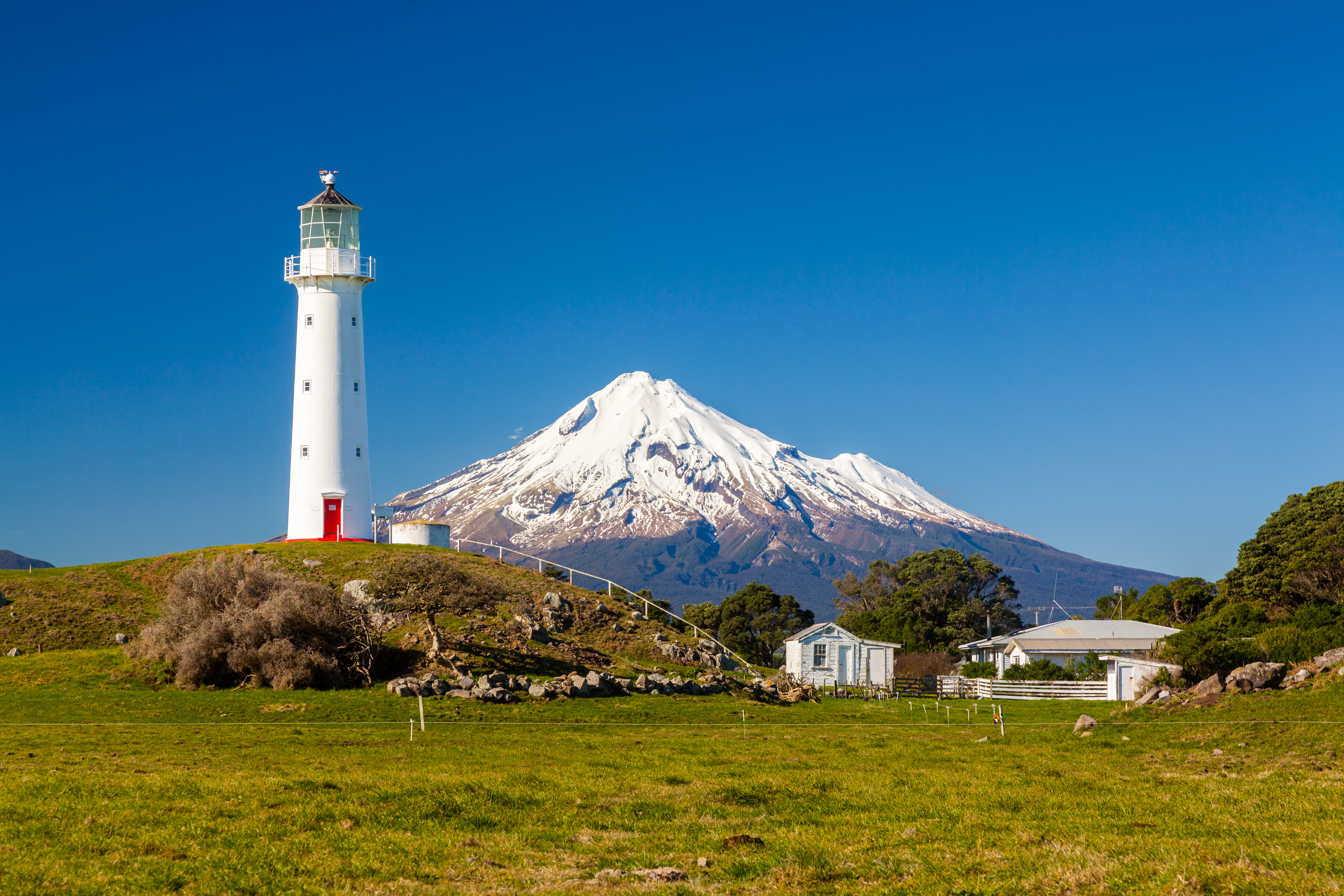
- Cape Egmont Lighthouse with Mount Taranaki in the background
- Interactive map of Cape Egmont
- Location: 39°16′46″S 173°45′07″E
- Water bodies: North Taranaki Bight, South Taranaki Bight

Cape Egmont, splitting Northern and Southern Taranaki Bights, is the westernmost point of Taranaki, on the west coast of New Zealand's North Island. It is located close to the volcanic cone of Mount Taranaki or Mount Egmont.

It was named Kaap Pieter Boreel by Dutch explorer Abel Tasman in 1642, but renamed Cape Egmont after Earl of Egmont, by British explorer James Cook in 1769. Tasman did not sight Mount Taranaki, due to bad visibility, but Cook did, and after naming the mountain Mount Egmont, bestowed the same name on the promontory, which became the enduring name.

In July 1862, Kapoaiaia near Cape Egmont was the site of a hui between 600 members of Taranaki, Ngāti Ruanui, Ngā Rauru and Whanganui Māori iwi, discussing the First Taranaki War (1860–1861). There, it was agreed that the lands East and West of New Plymouth (Tataraimaka, Kaipopo, Waitaha and Waitara) were Māori lands, and that any attempt by European settlers to create a road south of Waireka Hill would be considered an act of war.

The Cape Egmont Lighthouse was originally constructed on Mana Island near Porirua but was relocated to Cape Egmont in 1877.

== Climate ==
Climate data for Cape Egmont (1981–2010)
Month	Jan	Feb	Mar	Apr	May	Jun	Jul	Aug	Sep	Oct	Nov	Dec	Year
Mean daily maximum °C (°F)	21.3 (70.3)	21.7 (71.1)	20.7 (69.3)	18.5 (65.3)	16.4 (61.5)	14.3 (57.7)	13.7 (56.7)	14.0 (57.2)	15.2 (59.4)	16.5 (61.7)	17.7 (63.9)	20.1 (68.2)	17.5 (63.5)
Daily mean °C (°F)	18.0 (64.4)	18.1 (64.6)	16.8 (62.2)	15.0 (59.0)	13.3 (55.9)	11.2 (52.2)	10.4 (50.7)	10.9 (51.6)	12.0 (53.6)	13.3 (55.9)	14.3 (57.7)	16.7 (62.1)	14.2 (57.5)
Mean daily minimum °C (°F)	14.6 (58.3)	14.5 (58.1)	12.9 (55.2)	11.6 (52.9)	10.2 (50.4)	8.1 (46.6)	7.0 (44.6)	7.7 (45.9)	8.8 (47.8)	10.0 (50.0)	11.0 (51.8)	13.3 (55.9)	10.8 (51.5)
Average rainfall mm (inches)	96.6 (3.80)	82.6 (3.25)	108.0 (4.25)	128.0 (5.04)	133.3 (5.25)	138.6 (5.46)	160.9 (6.33)	130.0 (5.12)	121.6 (4.79)	111.1 (4.37)	84.0 (3.31)	115.0 (4.53)	1,409.7 (55.5)
Source: NIWA (rain 1971–2000)
