= Maritime Transport Act 1994 =

Act of Parliament in New Zealand

New Zealand Parliament
- Long title: An Act— (a) To continue the Maritime Safety Authority of New Zealand; and (b) To enable the implementation of New Zealand's obligations under international maritime agreements; and (c) To ensure that participants in the maritime transport system are responsible for their actions; and (d) To consolidate and amend maritime transport law; and (e) [Repealed] (f) To protect the marine environment; and (g) To continue, or enable, the implementation of obligations on New Zealand under various international conventions relating to pollution of the marine environment Paragraph (e) was repealed, as from 5 May 2003, by section 33(1)(a) Health and Safety in Employment Amendment Act 2002 (2002 No 86)
- Royal assent: 17 November 1994
- Commenced: 17 November 1994
- Status: Current legislation

The Maritime Transport Act 1994 defines the statutory powers of Maritime New Zealand.
