= Tuhawaiki Point Lighthouse =

Lighthouse in New Zealand

Tuhawaiki Point Lighthouse Jack's Point Lighthouse
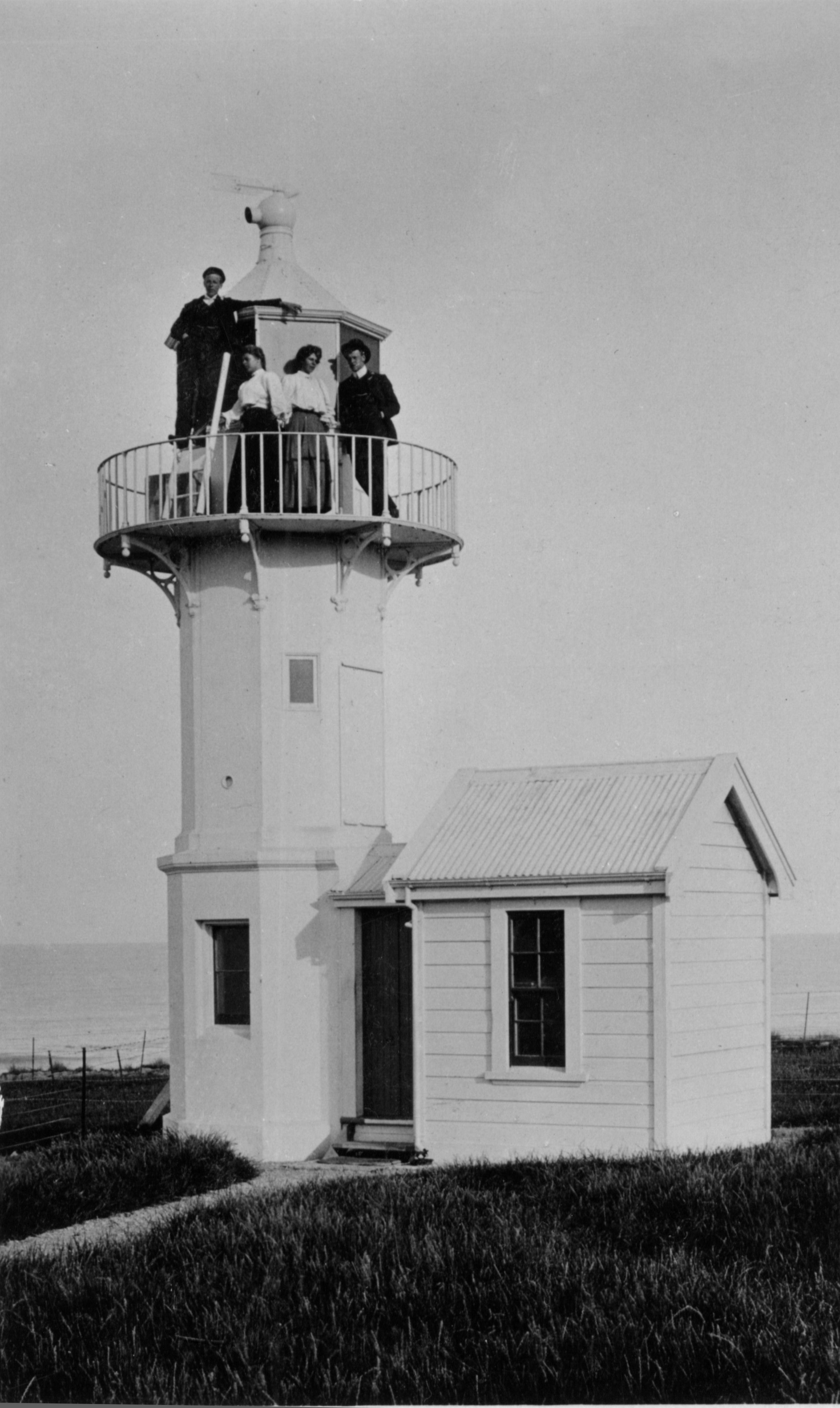
- Tuhawaiki Point light house at Jack's Point, Timaru, NZ, approx. 1904
- Location: Jack's Point; Timaru; New Zealand
- Coordinates: 44°26′34.8″S 171°15′38.0″E

Tower
- Constructed: 1866 (first)
- Construction: cast iron tower
- Automated: 1930
- Height: 9 metres (30 ft)
- Shape: octagonal tower with balcony and lantern
- Markings: white tower and lantern
- Power source: mains electricity
- Operator: Maritime New Zealand

Light
- First lit: 1903 (current)
- Focal height: 29 metres (95 ft) above sea level
- Range: 9 nautical miles (17 km; 10 mi)
- Characteristic: Fl W 10s.

The Tuhawaiki Point Lighthouse or Jack's Point Lighthouse stands near to Timaru at the east coast of the South Island of New Zealand.

== Geography ==
The lighthouse stands at Jack's Point 5 kilometres (3.1 mi) south of Timaru. It can be reached via New Zealand State Highway 1 from the small settlement Scarborough. Approx 40 metres (130 ft) further landwards passes the South Island Main Trunk Railway the building.

== Name ==
The place is named after the Māori chief Hone (Jack) Tūhawaiki, who belonged to the Ngāi Tahu tribe.

== History ==
The lighthouse was installed in 1903 at its current location, when it replaced the insufficient beacon of Timaru harbour. It had been built in 1866 from cast iron and was used until 1900 on Somes Island in Wellington Harbour, until a new tower was built there. It was automated one year after being relocated and since 1930 it was operated without staff. It is still being used.

== See also ==
- List of lighthouses in New Zealand
