= Castle Point, New York =

- Hamlet
- Location within New York Location within the United States
- Coordinates: 41°32′46″N 73°57′34″W
- Country: United States
- State: New York
- County: Dutchess
- Elevation: 177 ft (54 m)
- Time zone: UTC-5 (Eastern (EST))
  - Summer (DST): UTC-4 (EDT)
- ZIP code: 12511
- Area code: 845
- GNIS feature ID: 945995

Castle Point is a hamlet in Dutchess County, New York, United States. The community is 2.9 miles (4.7 km) north of Beacon. Castle Point has a post office with ZIP code 12511.
