= Farewell Spit Lighthouse =

Lighthouse in New Zealand

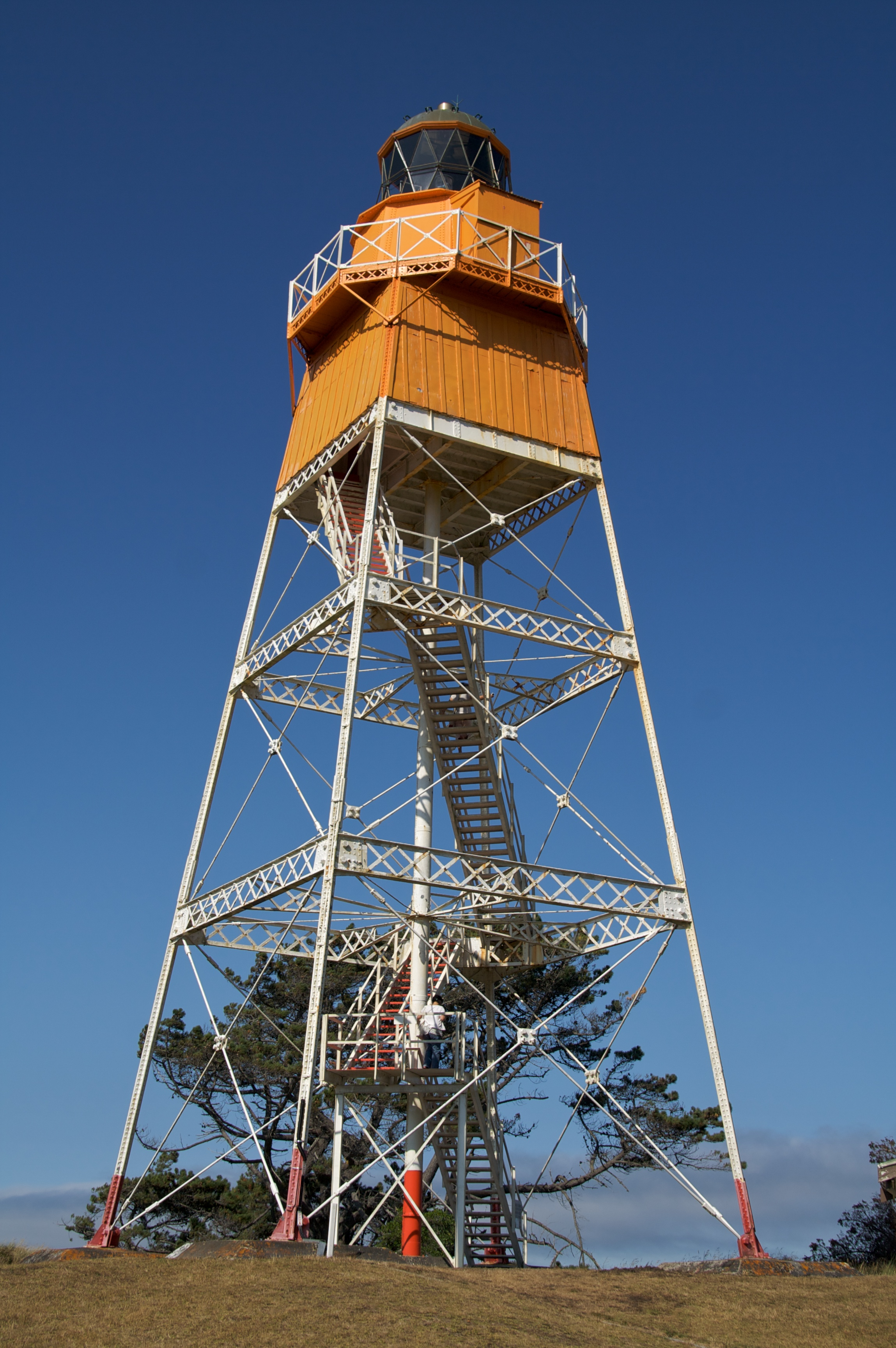
- Location: Farewell Spit, Tasman District, New Zealand
- Coordinates: 40°32′46″S 173°00′34″E

Tower
- Constructed: 1896
- Construction: metal (artificial physical structure)
- Automated: 1984
- Height: 27 m (89 ft)
- Markings: Grey (tower), orange (top)
- Power source: solar power

Light
- First lit: 19 January 1897
- Focal height: 30 m (98 ft)
- Lens: second order Fresnel lens
- Light source: rotating LED beacon
- Range: 19 nmi (35 km; 22 mi) (red)
- Characteristic: Fl WR 15s
- Original lighthouse
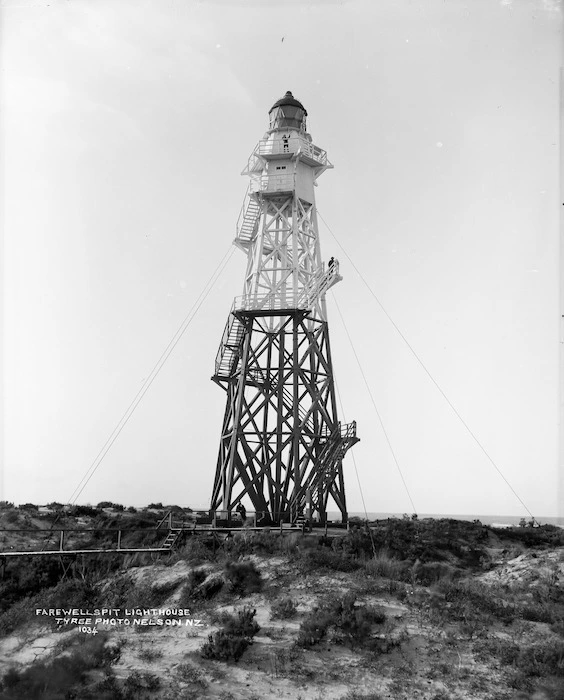
- Constructed: 1870
- Construction: lumber
- Height: 34.4 m (113 ft)
- Markings: White (tower)
- First lit: 17 June 1870
- Deactivated: 17 January 1897
- Focal height: 36.6 m (120 ft)
- Lens: second order Fresnel lens
- Range: 17 nmi (31 km; 20 mi)
- Characteristic: Fl WR 60s

The Farewell Spit Lighthouse is located at the end of New Zealand's longest sand spit in Golden Bay / Mohua, near the northern tip of the South Island. It guides vessels entering Cook Strait from the west and south. The LED rotating beacon flashes white or red, once every 15 seconds. It has a range of 19 nautical miles (35 km; 22 mi). Red is shown to warn approaching vessels of extensive shoaling. Standing 27 metres (89 ft) tall, the tower needs to be taller than the support structures of most lighthouses built on cliffs or headlands, because the sand foundations it is built upon are almost at sea level. The tower is constructed of an open steel lattice to withstand abrasive sand and salt-laden winds.

== History ==
The drifting sand dunes of Farewell Spit are low lying and interspersed with fresh water lagoons, with an extensive shoal area on the southern side. The need for a lighthouse to warn mariners was identified in 1856, in the days of early European settlement, in response to a growing number of stranding and wrecks. An initial proposal was made for a floating lighthouse, moored 2 miles (3.2 km) off the end of the spit. In 1866, there were protests about government delays in establishing a lighthouse on Farewell Spit. Eventually, under the direction of James Balfour, Colonial Marine Engineer and Superintendent of Lighthouses, a design was prepared for a lighthouse to be built at Bush End Point, near the end of the sandspit. The first lighthouse was constructed on a wooden lattice tower in 1870. However, it was no match for the abrasive sand and salt-laden winds. Tenders were called in December 1894 for a replacement steel lattice tower, and a new lighthouse was commissioned in January 1897.

The original oil-burning lamp was converted to a 1000-watt electric lamp in 1954, and the diesel power supply replaced by a buried mains electricity cable along the spit in 1966. The original lamp was changed to a modern rotating beacon with a 50-watt tungsten halogen bulb in 1999. In 2019, the lighthouse was converted to solar power, and the mains supply disconnected.

The spit was a barren and uninviting place to be a lighthouse keeper. Sand got into everything. The lighthouse sits on a low vegetated dune; an oasis surrounded by an ever-changing landscape, reshaped by incessant wind and tide. Early attempts at gardening were swamped during exceptional high tides, or plants were eaten by marauding weka.

Since being de-manned and automated in 1984, the keepers' houses are used by the Department of Conservation and tour groups.

The keepers include:

- Alexander Greenlees McKinlay (2nd assistant, 1871–1872)
- James Nelson (c. 1870s)
- Robert Leighton (c. 1916)
- Hugh Jamieson (1946–1949)

In 2016, structural repairs were made to the tower and it was given a major repaint. All materials for the work, including 10 storeys of scaffolding, paint, and the water required for blasting and surface preparation had to be transported along the sandspit to the site.

== Access ==
The lighthouse is located approximately 27 kilometres (17 mi) along the sand spit. Farewell Spit / Onetahua is a wildlife sanctuary run by the Department of Conservation. The area is an important bird nesting area, especially for Australasian gannet. It is closed to casual visitors, and public access to the lighthouse site is restricted to people on an organised tour. The public is not permitted to climb the lighthouse structure.

== Operations ==
The lighthouse is operated by Maritime New Zealand. With a focal height of 30 metres (98 ft) above sea level, the light can be seen for 19 nautical miles (35 km; 22 mi). Its characteristic is either a white or red flash every fifteen seconds, depending on where you view it from. It is a sector light. The red flashes warn a vessel it is in a danger of hitting the shoal. The white sector shines from 113° to 299° and 333° to 110°; the red from 299° to 333°.

== Depiction on postage stamps ==
The Farewell Spit Lighthouse was featured on a 10-cent postage stamp issued in 1969 in conjunction with the centenary of the New Zealand Government Life Insurance Office.

== Gallery ==
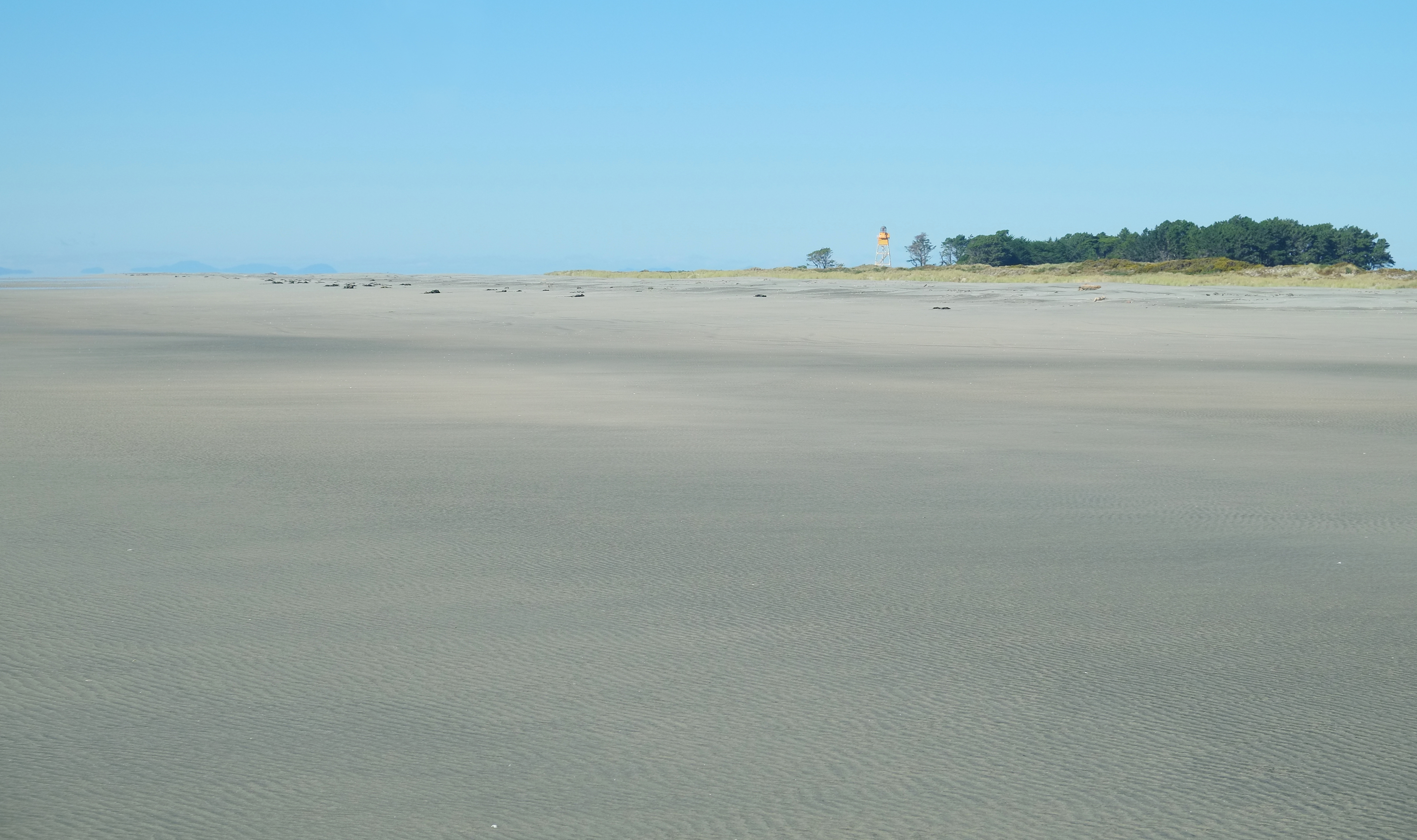
Exposed to sand and salt-laden winds

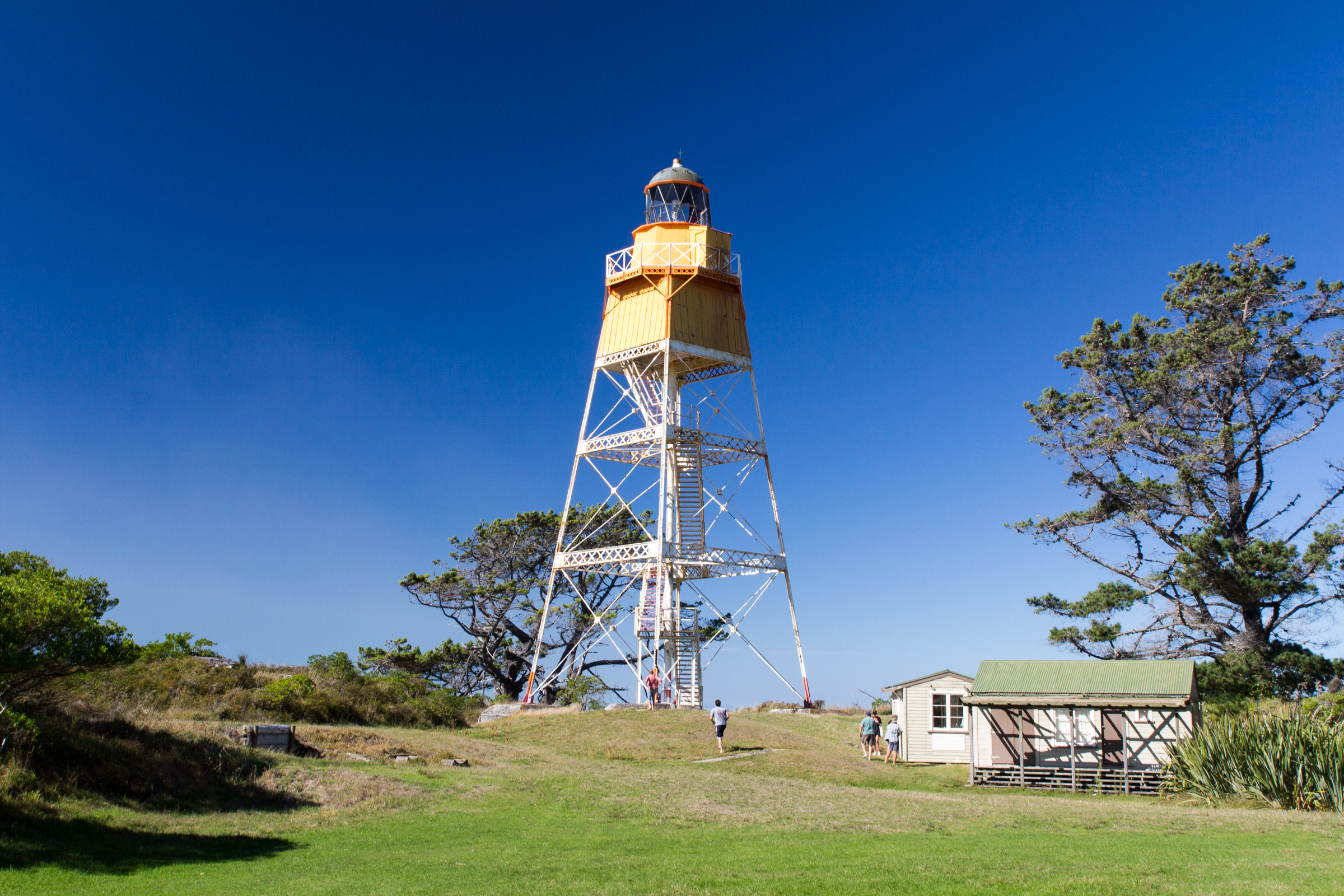
Some of the keepers' houses

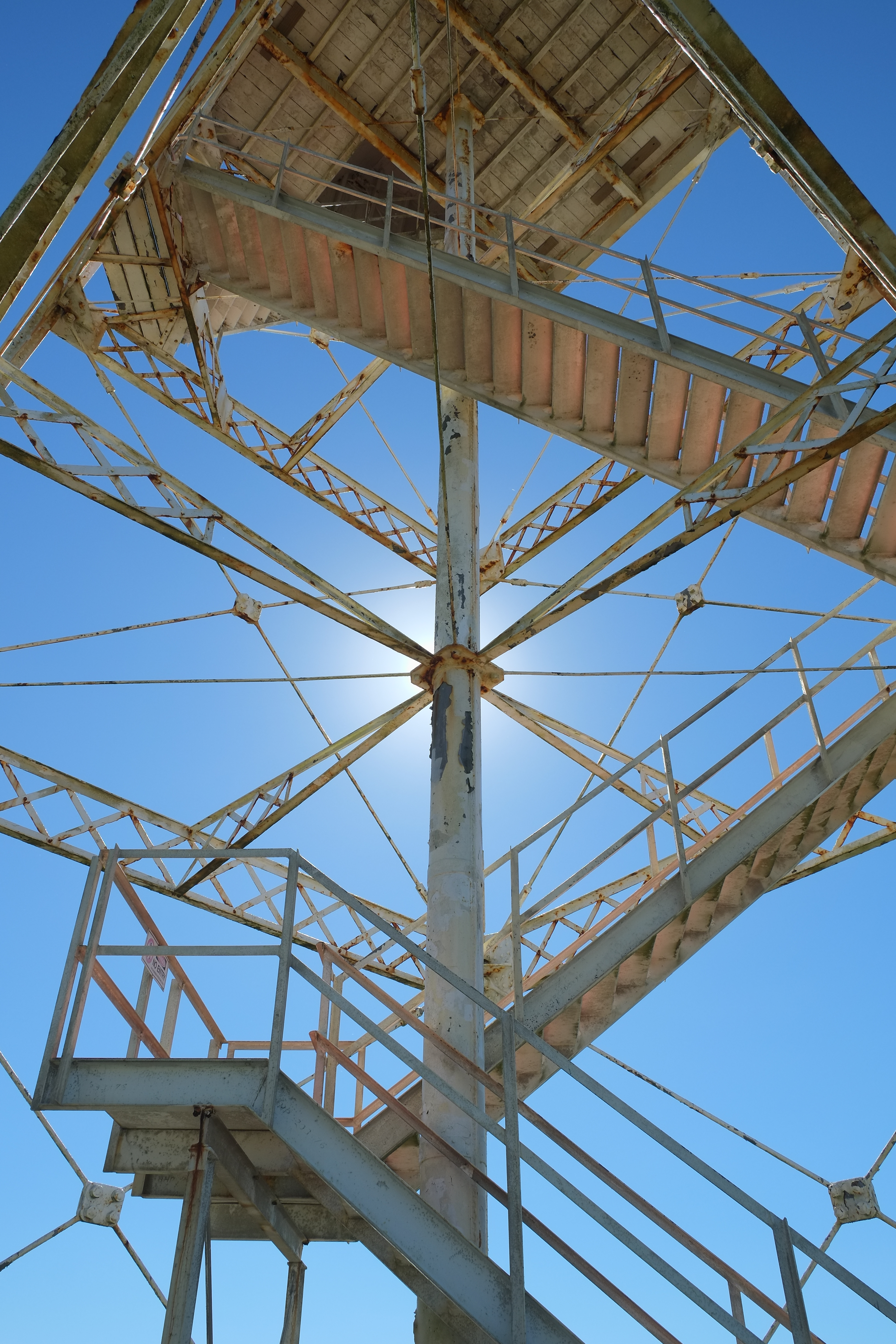
Open lattice structure

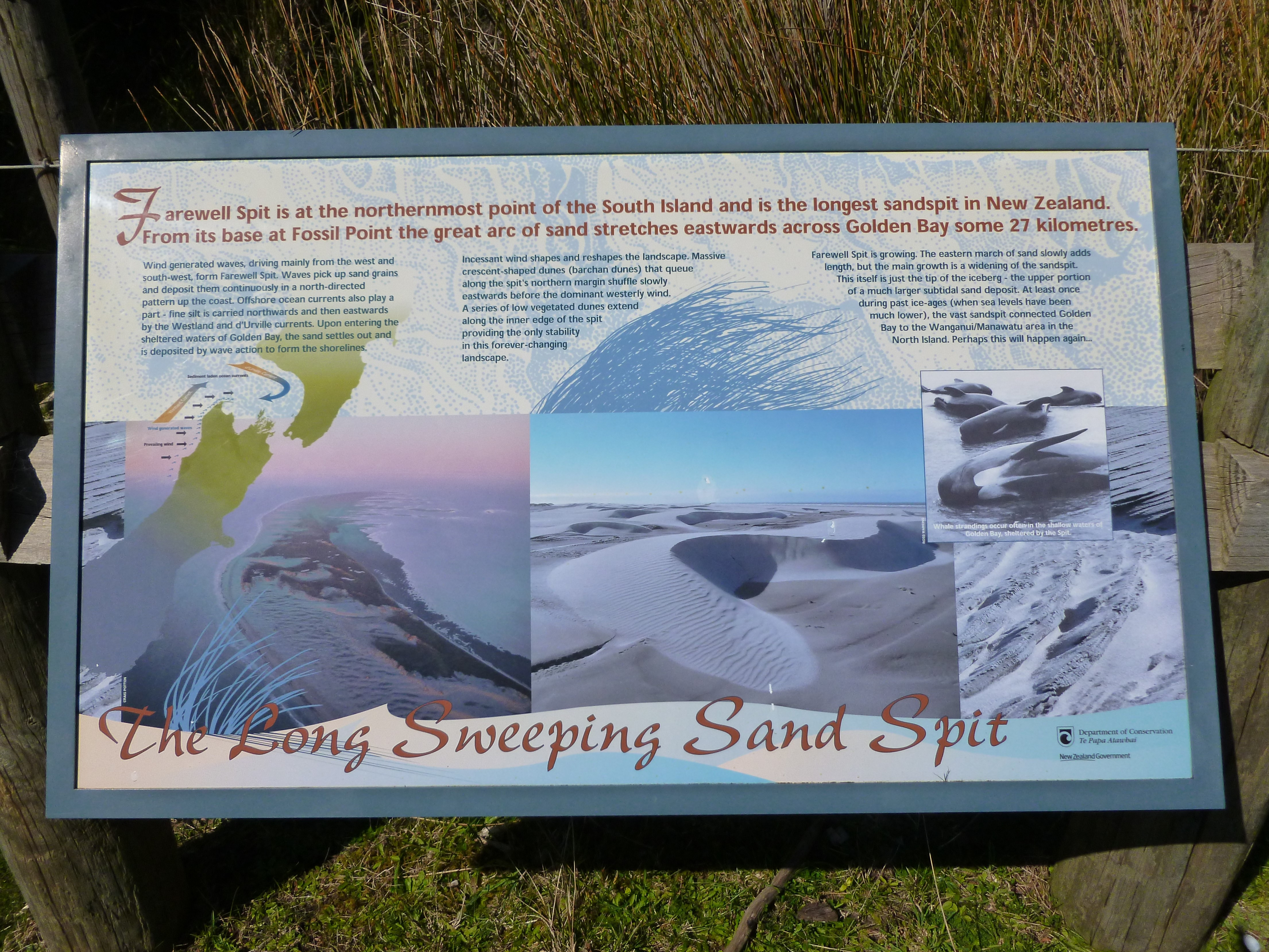
