= Maritime New Zealand =

Maritime safety authority of New Zealand

- Logo of Maritime New Zealand

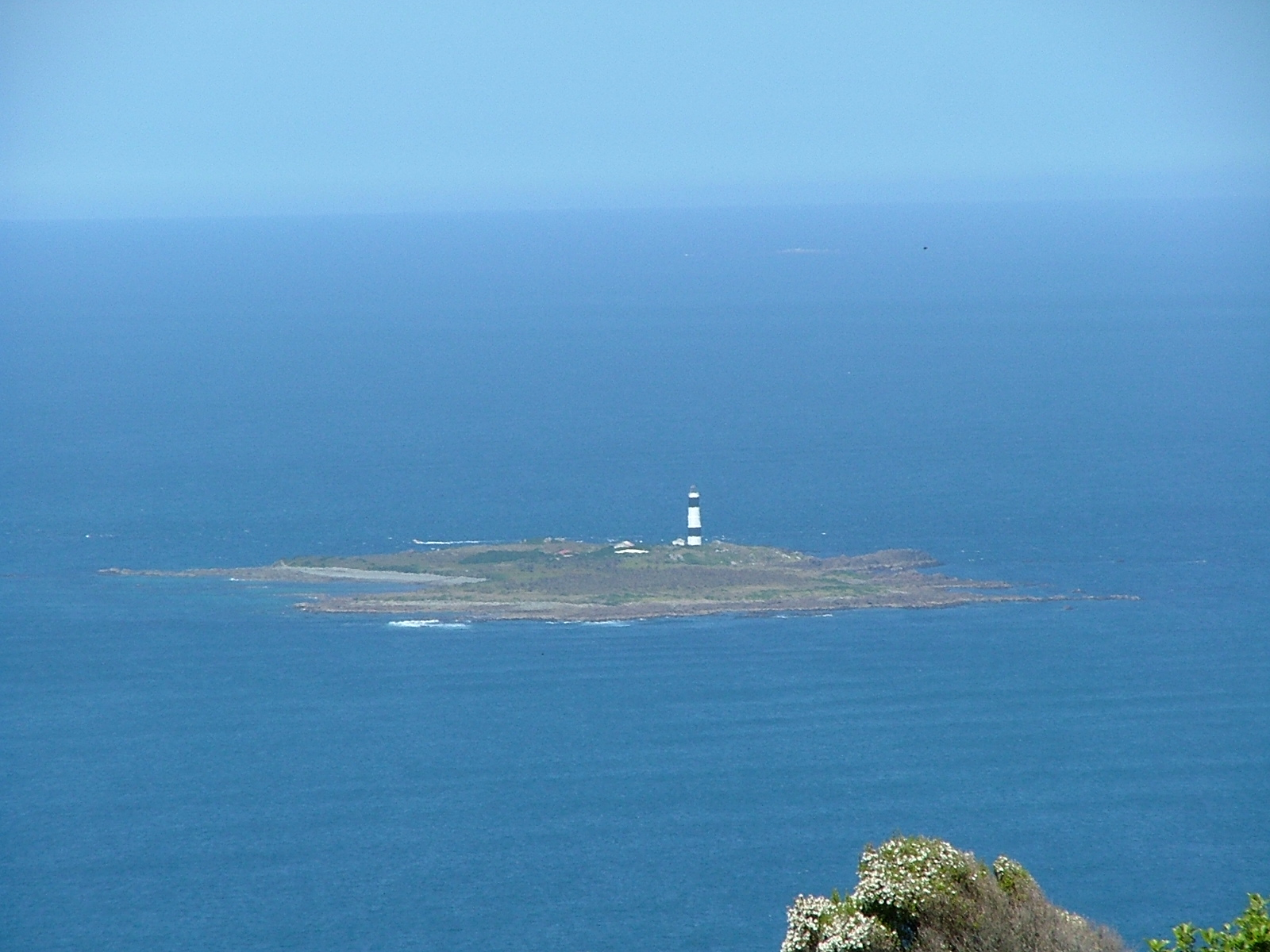
- Dog Island off the coast of the South Island

Agency overview
- Formed: 1993
- Jurisdiction: Government of New Zealand
- Headquarters: Level 11, Optimation House, 1 Grey Street, Wellington; 41.284860°S 174.776588°E
- Employees: 190
- Annual budget: $36 million NZD
- Agency executive: Keith Manch, Chief Executive
- Parent agency: Ministry of Transport
- Website: www.maritimenz.govt.nz

Maritime New Zealand (New Zealand Maritime Safety Authority) is a Crown entity and also a state maritime safety authority responsible for protecting the maritime transport sequence and marine environment within New Zealand and maintaining safety and security.

They define their vision as: "a maritime environment with minimum deaths, accidents, incidents and pollution as part of an integrated and sustainable transport system".

Maritime New Zealand also provides guidance and advice about Seafarer Certifications.

== History ==
A maritime authority called the Marine Board was originally established in 1862 and controlled by the Customs Department until near the end of the nineteenth century, when it was renamed the Marine Department.

In 1907, the Marine Department acquired the 805 ton Royal Navy gun boat HMS Sparrow. This was converted into a training ship and renamed NZS Amokura. Over the next 14 years 527 boys trained in Amokura, 25 of them going on to naval service and most of the others into the merchant marine.

In 1972, the Marine Department was absorbed into the Ministry of Transport. In 1993 a Crown entity was established and called the Maritime Safety Authority before being subsequently rebranded as Maritime New Zealand in July 2005.

== Current structure ==
As of 2017, the entity employed approximately 190 staff. It is managed by a five-member board appointed by the responsible minister (Minister of Transport) under the Maritime Transport Act 1994. One of its key responsibilities is the operation and maintenance of the lighthouses around New Zealand's coastline.

== Operations ==
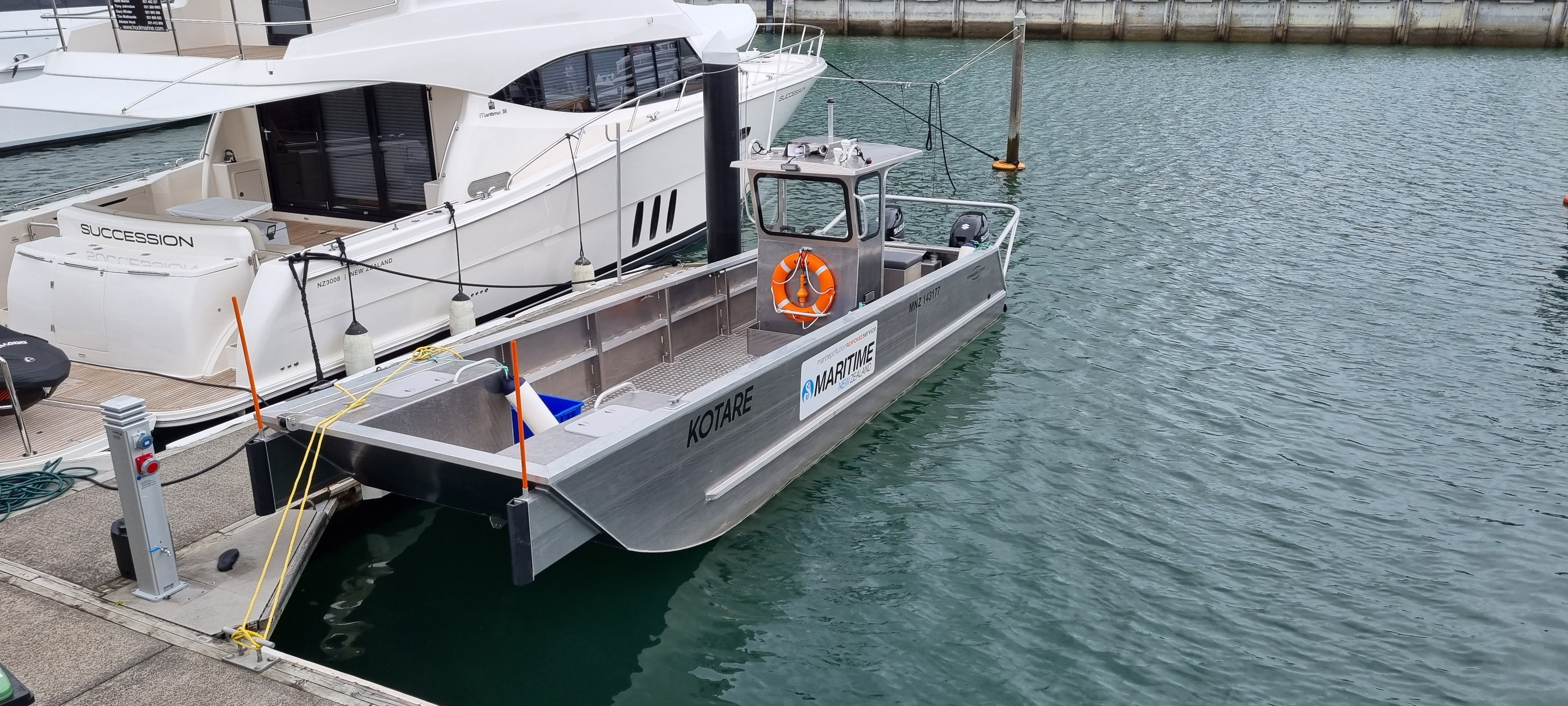
Kōtare, one of several pollution and oil spill response boats

Maritime NZ operates the Marine Pollution Response Service, which consists of 20 warehouses across New Zealand and a small fleet of trailer boats, to respond to oil spills and marine pollution disasters. Most of the equipment is stored at their headquarters in Te Atatū Peninsula, Auckland.

== See also ==
- Royal New Zealand Coastguard
- Surf Life Saving New Zealand
