= Dog Island Lighthouse =

Lighthouse at Foveaux Strait, New Zealand

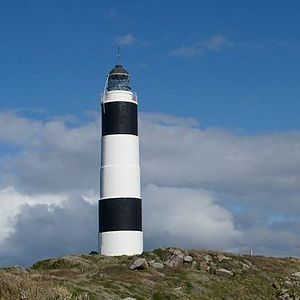
- The Dog Island Lighthouse in 2011 with its distinctive stripes
- Location: Dog Island, Foveaux Strait, New Zealand
- Coordinates: 46°39′07″S 168°24′38″E

Tower
- Constructed: 1865
- Construction: stone tower
- Automated: 1989
- Height: 36 metres (118 ft)
- Shape: cylindrical tower with balcony and lantern
- Markings: white tower with two black bands, black lantern dome
- Power source: solar power
- Operator: Maritime New Zealand

Light
- Focal height: 46 metres (151 ft)
- Range: 19 nautical miles (35 km; 22 mi)
- Characteristic: FI W 10s.

Heritage New Zealand – Category 1
- Designated: 22 November 1984
- Reference no.: 395

The Dog Island Lighthouse on Dog Island in Foveaux Strait is New Zealand's tallest lighthouse, and one of its oldest. It is notable for its masonry construction, and is a work example by an engineer who was prominent at the time. The lighthouse employed the first revolving beam in New Zealand, and the unique original light apparatus was in use for 60 years. Dog Island Lighthouse is one of the most distinct lighthouses in New Zealand, with only two others having stripes painted on them for better visibility at daytime. The lighthouse is registered by Heritage New Zealand as a Category I structure, and the adjacent lighthouse keepers cottage has a Category II registration. Originally operated by three lighthouse keepers, the structure has since 1989 been remote controlled from Maritime New Zealand's Wellington office, with Dog Island since having been uninhabited. Dog Island Lighthouse has twice featured on New Zealand stamps.

== Background ==
It was clear that a lighthouse was needed in Foveaux Strait, but there were long discussions in the 1860s where to place it. Captains with local experience were asked for their opinion, and they suggested possible sites on Centre Island, Ruapuke Island, Stewart Island, Solander Islands, and Dog Island. The latter was chosen as Southland's first site for a lighthouse; the recommendation was made by the Invercargill Harbour Master to James Alexander Robertson Menzies, the first Superintendent of the Southland Province. The Harbour Master's rationale was that the island was dangerous, as "it is very low and not seen till close upon it". At the time, the Southland Province had just split from Otago Province, and both provincial governments were involved. There was confusion over who would take ownership of the situation, and in the end, the central government assumed responsibility for the construction of all lighthouses throughout the colony.

== Construction ==
James Balfour, at the time marine engineer to the Otago Provincial Council and later to the Colonial Government of New Zealand, was commissioned during 1863 to design the lighthouse. Balfour ordered the lighthouse equipment and the light apparatus from the renowned Edinburgh lighthouse designer Alan Stevenson. Balfour had trained under Stevenson's brothers David and Thomas Stevenson. In 1848, Balfour's older sister Maggie had married Thomas Stevenson, hence the Stevensons were his brothers-in-law.

The equipment arrived on the ship City Of Dunedin from Glasgow in Port Chalmers on 3 September 1863, and the light apparatus arrived via the ship Resolute on 17 March 1864. The light apparatus for the Taiaroa Head lighthouse also arrived on the Resolute.

Dog Island is low-lying and rocky, and its highest (natural) point is about 15 metres (49 ft) above sea level. Calculations showed that the lighthouse would have to be some 110 feet (34 m) tall if built on the highest point to be effective. An investigation showed that there was enough rock that could be quarried on the island for the structure, and that it would be too expensive to build such a tall tower from steel.

The tower designed by Balfour was 36 metres (118 ft) tall. It had a diameter of 6.6 metres (22 ft) at its base, and 5.0 metres (16.4 ft) below the balcony. The lantern was placed at a height of 30.5 metres (100 ft). Two dwellings, also designed by Balfour, were constructed for the lighthouse keepers and their families. The total cost came to £10,480-12s-8d, which was significantly more than the average cost of between £4,000 and £6,000 at the time. The light apparatus was specifically designed for the remoteness of the location. Instead of the usual central burner system with one lamp, sixteen lamps were used arranged in four, each with their own mirror behind it. The lamps were mounted on a frame with a square base that completed a revolution powered by a massive clockwork every two minutes, thus achieving a beam every 30 seconds. The reason behind the arrangement was redundancy; even if one of the lamps failed, the other three pointing in the same direction would still produce a, albeit somewhat weaker, beam. The light mechanism was also reasonably simple to repair should the need arise. It was the first revolving light apparatus in New Zealand.

== History ==
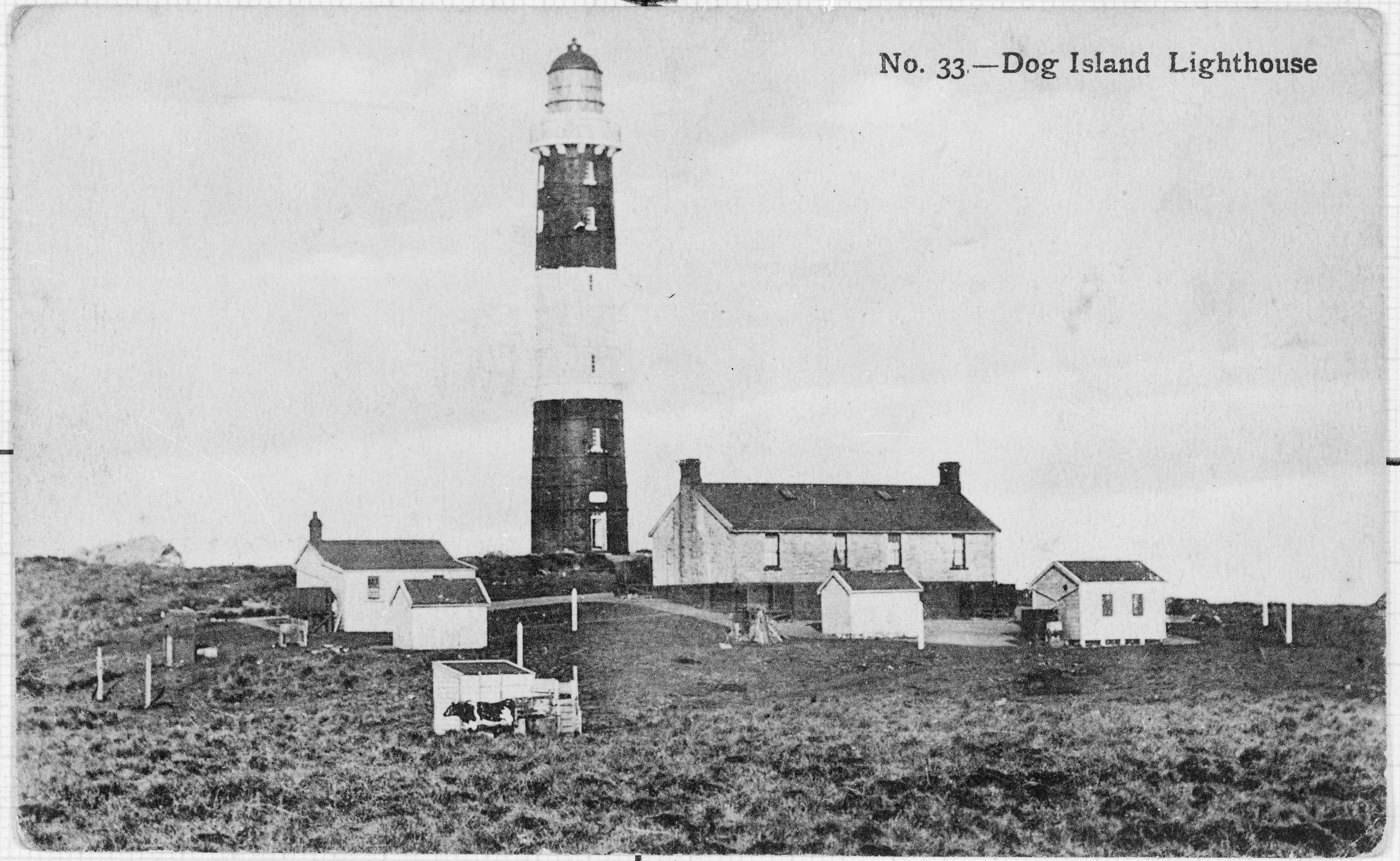
Dog Island Lighthouse in the early 1900s

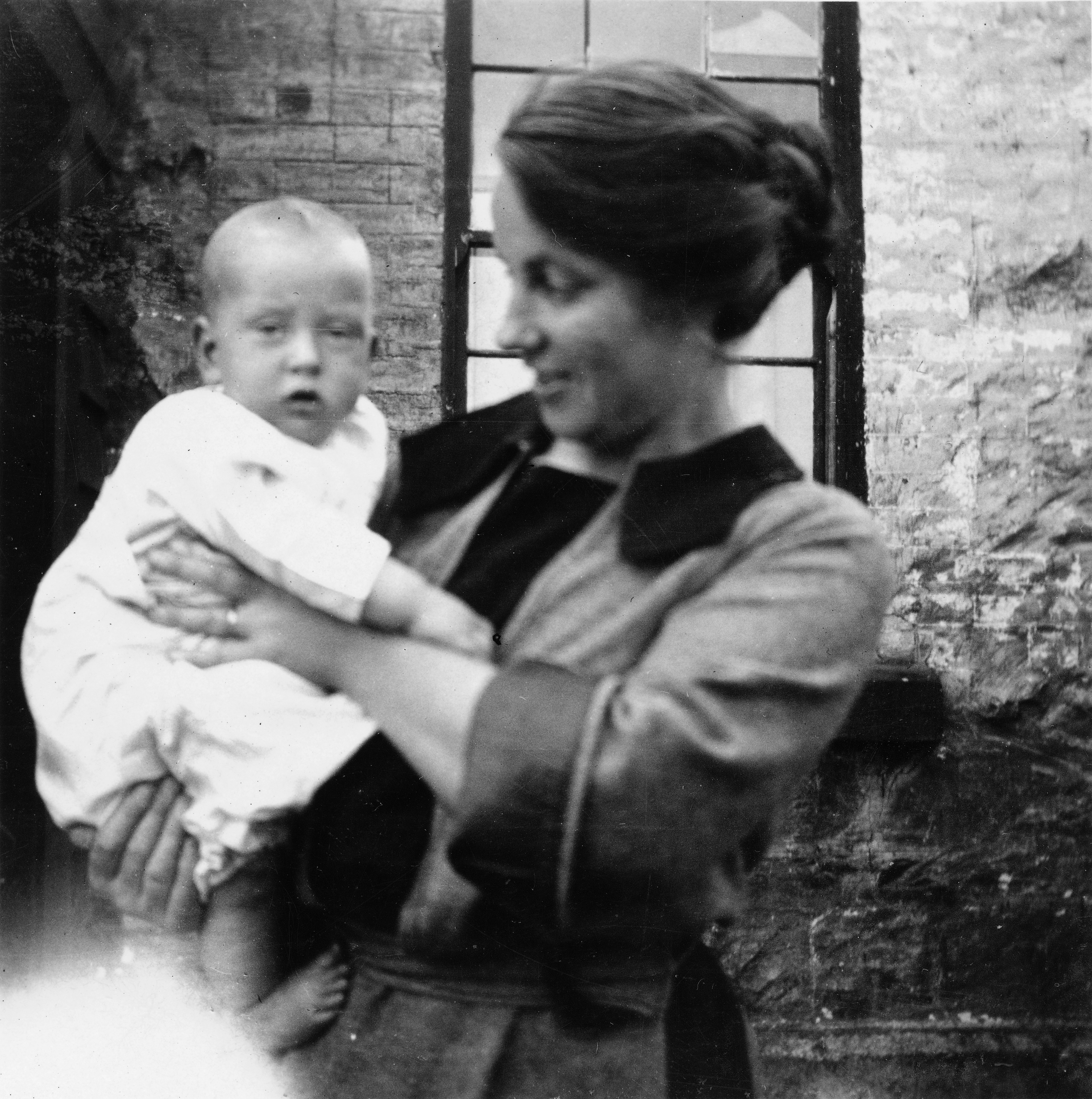
Dog Island Lighthouse keeper's wife and baby in 1924

The lighthouse was first operated on 5 August 1865. Within a year of its construction, it was noted that the tower oscillated in high winds much more than other towers. Due to weak peaty subsoils, the tower took on a slight lean. During storms, the tower leaked severely and it was feared that this would strengthen the mortar between the stones. Weak mortar was scraped out in 1867 and replaced with Portland cement. At the same time, the tower was painted with a large white stripe in the middle, with the remainder painted in black, both to make the tower more visible during daylight, but also to further waterproof the structure. This colour scheme has remained ever since.

In 1871, a crack appeared at the base of the tower and the Marine Engineer of the day ordered immediate strengthening. This was carried out with strong hardwood and wrought iron bands. This work, significantly hindered by bad weather, cost £978-4s-3d. By 1916, it was decided that major strengthening was necessary again, as the cement grout was failing. Plans drawn up then and amended two years later saw a reinforced concrete skin of 2 feet (0.61 m) in thickness being applied to the outside up to just below the balcony, and an internal 6 inches (150 mm) reinforced concrete lining up to the fourth floor. The tower was repainted in its previous colour scheme.

The burners for the lights were changed from colza oil to paraffin oil in 1876. The original system was in use for 60 years, and in 1925, the optical apparatus was upgraded to a second order dioptric lens with an incandescent oil burner. This changed the light output to three flashes in quick succession every 30 seconds. A diesel electric plant was installed in 1954, and electrical operation of the beam started in October of that year. The diesel generator was replaced in 1970. In September 1999, the light was replaced again, this time with a rotating beacon, with a 35-watt halogen bulb as the light source. The energy comes from solar panels and a battery bank.

A third dwelling for lighthouse keepers was built in 1884. The three original dwellings were in a poor state by the 1920s and two houses with six rooms each were built for the families; at the same time, the two original cottages became storage sheds. A new house was built in 1979 for the by then single lighthouse keeper.

There were originally three lighthouse keepers with their families on the island. The initial rotating light mechanism had to be wound up hourly, and in 1883, the principal lighthouse keeper died when he fell down the central shaft trying to attach weights to the mechanism. In 1977, the number of lighthouse keepers were reduced from two to one due to operational improvements. There was a Committee of Inquiry into lighthouse automation in 1981 and the Dog Island site was one of nine sites throughout New Zealand that was to remain staffed; in this case, it was due to its remoteness, and its ability to help with search and rescue in the area. In August 1989, Dog Island was fully automated and the last permanent lighthouse keeper in New Zealand was withdrawn from service. The lighthouse is remote controlled from Maritime New Zealand's Wellington office.

Despite the lighthouse, the steamer SS Waikouaiti ran aground on Dog Island on 28 November 1939 during dense fog and was wrecked.

== Stamps ==
Dog Island Lighthouse has twice featured on New Zealand stamps. In 1969, the New Zealand Government Life Insurance Department (better known as Government Life) issued five stamps showing lighthouses, (Note: Government Life was established in 1869 and since an unprecedented decision in 1890 could issue its own stamps for its correspondence. Government Life has always used lighthouses on its stamps, but mostly stylised. The organisation is now called Tower Insurance.) with the highest denomination (15c) depicting the Dog Island Lighthouse. In 2009, New Zealand Post issued five stamps commemorating the 150th anniversary of New Zealand's oldest lighthouse at Pencarrow Head; the Dog Island Lighthouse was included with a $1 value.

== Today ==
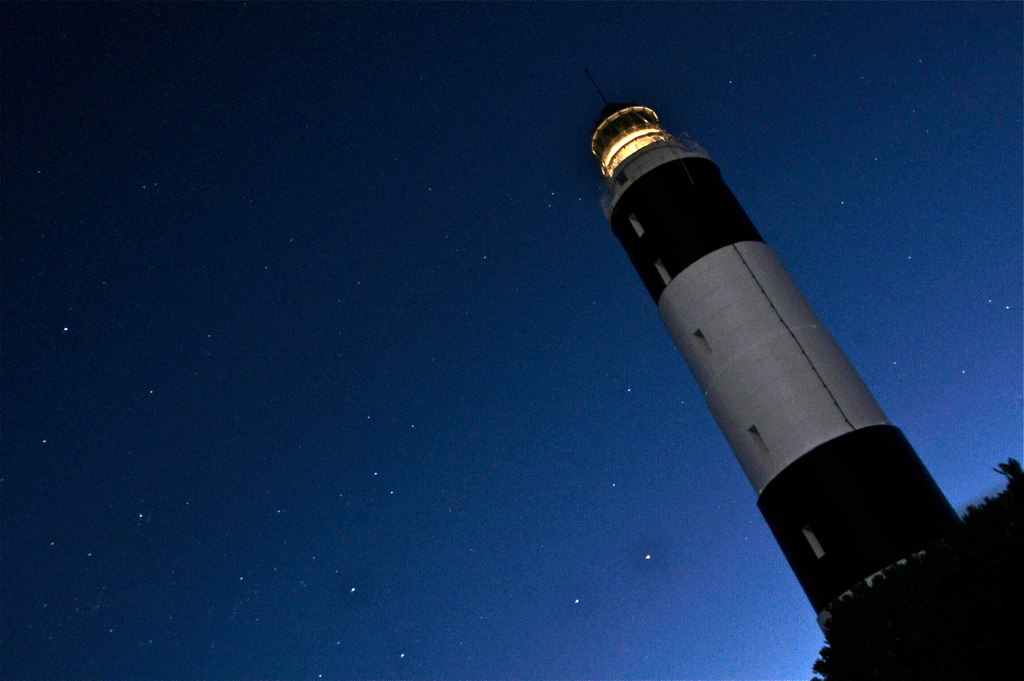

The lighthouse was automated in 1989, and the island has since been uninhabited. The lighthouse is the tallest lighthouse in New Zealand, and one of its oldest. Due to its black and white stripes, it might be one of New Zealand's most distinctive lighthouses. There are only two other lighthouses in New Zealand of similar appearance; Cape Campbell Lighthouse also has black and white stripes, whilst Cape Palliser Lighthouse has red and white stripes. The lens from 1925 is on display at the Museum of Wellington City & Sea on Jervois Quay in Wellington, on loan from Maritime New Zealand. The 1865 rotating mechanism can be seen at the Bluff Maritime Museum.

There is no public access to Dog Island or to the lighthouse. The lighthouse is being maintained by Maritime New Zealand.

=== Heritage registrations ===
The lighthouse keepers cottage was registered by the New Zealand Historic Places Trust (now Heritage New Zealand) on 24 November 1983 as a Category II structure, with registration number 2562. On 22 November 1984, the Dog Island Lighthouse was registered as a Category I structure, with registration number 395. The lighthouse is significant for its height, its age, and the relatively rare use of masonry for such a structure. It is also an example of the work of an engineer who was prominent at his time.

== See also ==
- List of lighthouses in New Zealand
