= SS Taiaroa (1875) =

Steamship built in 1875 that operated in New Zealand

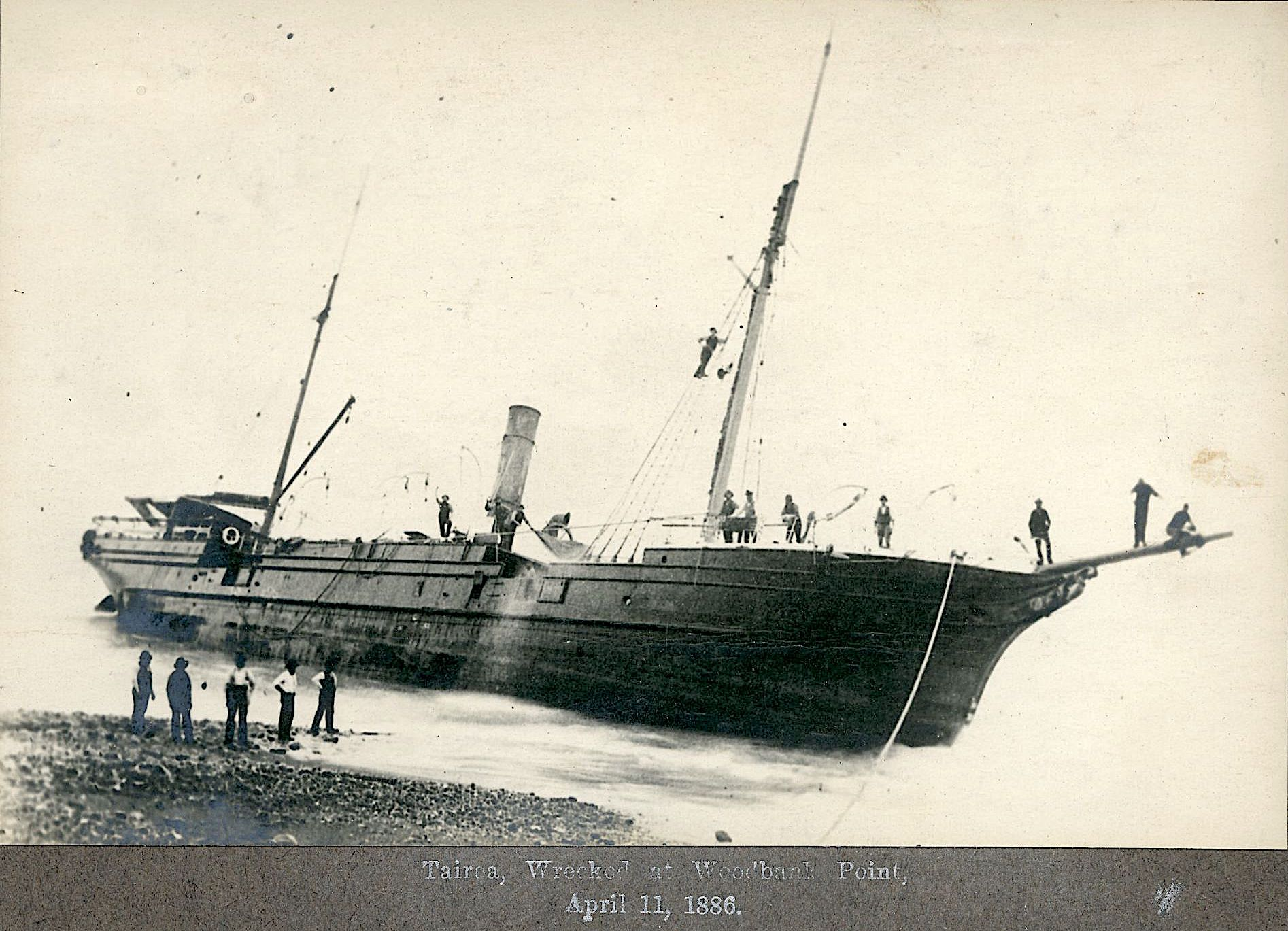
- Taiaroa wreck on the beach

History
- Name: SS Taiaroa
- Owner: Albion Shipping Company, Glasgow (1875-1879); Union Steamship Co. of New Zealand Ltd., Dunedin (1879-1886)
- Builder: A. & J. Inglis, Glasgow
- Yard number: 123
- Launched: 17 August 1875
- Fate: Grounded on 11 April 1886, total loss

General characteristics
- Tonnage: 438 gross register tons (GRT); 228 net register tons (NRT)
- Length: 189.3 ft (57.7 m)
- Beam: 23.2 ft (7.1 m)
- Depth: 12.6 ft (3.8 m)
- Installed power: 110 nhp

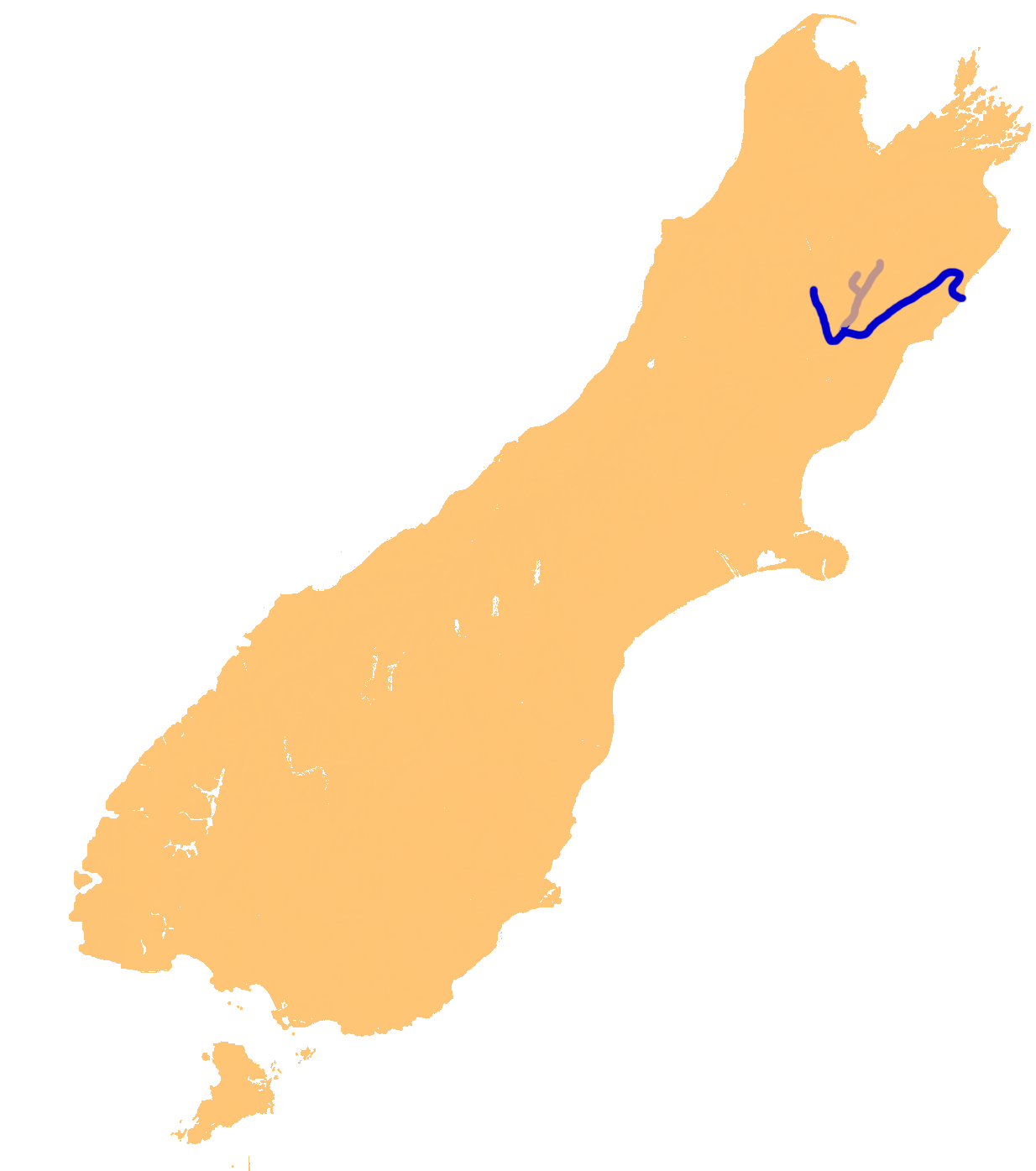
Clarence River

The SS Taiaroa was 228 ton Union Steam ship coaster that grounded near the Waiau Toa / Clarence River on 11 April 1886. Thirty six people, 15 passengers and 21 crew, total lost their lives when they abandoned the boat after it had grounded.

== Construction ==
The Taiaroa was schooner rigged and had a 438 gross tonnage and 228 tons net. She was built in 1875 at Glasgow by A. & J. Inglis for Patrick Henderson and Co, later Shaw-Savill and Albion Company. In 1876 she was sold to the Union Steam Shipping Company. The Taiaroa was powered by a 110 hp engines. She was 189 ft 3in long, 23 ft 2in beam, and her hold was 12 ft 6in deep. She was able to take 90 passengers.

== Maiden voyage ==
She sailed from Glasgow on 18 September 1875 under Captain Robert Gilpin. Gilpin died on 3 November, two days after she left Cape Town. The Chief Officer Joanness Spiegelthar took command. On 3 December she called at Hobart to coal. Reaching the Otago Coast on 10 December she stranded on the Old Man Rocks adjacent to Dog Island. That same day she was towed off by SS Express and arrived at Port Chalmers the following day.

== Union Steam Ship Co ==
Patrick Henderson and Co had become of the Albion Shipping Company and she was used as a coaster between Port Chalmers and Timaru under Captain James Stewart. In 1876 the Union Steam Ship Company purchased her and put Captain John Pietersen in charge. She was used mainly for coastal shipping but did undertake one voyage to Fiji.

== Grounding ==
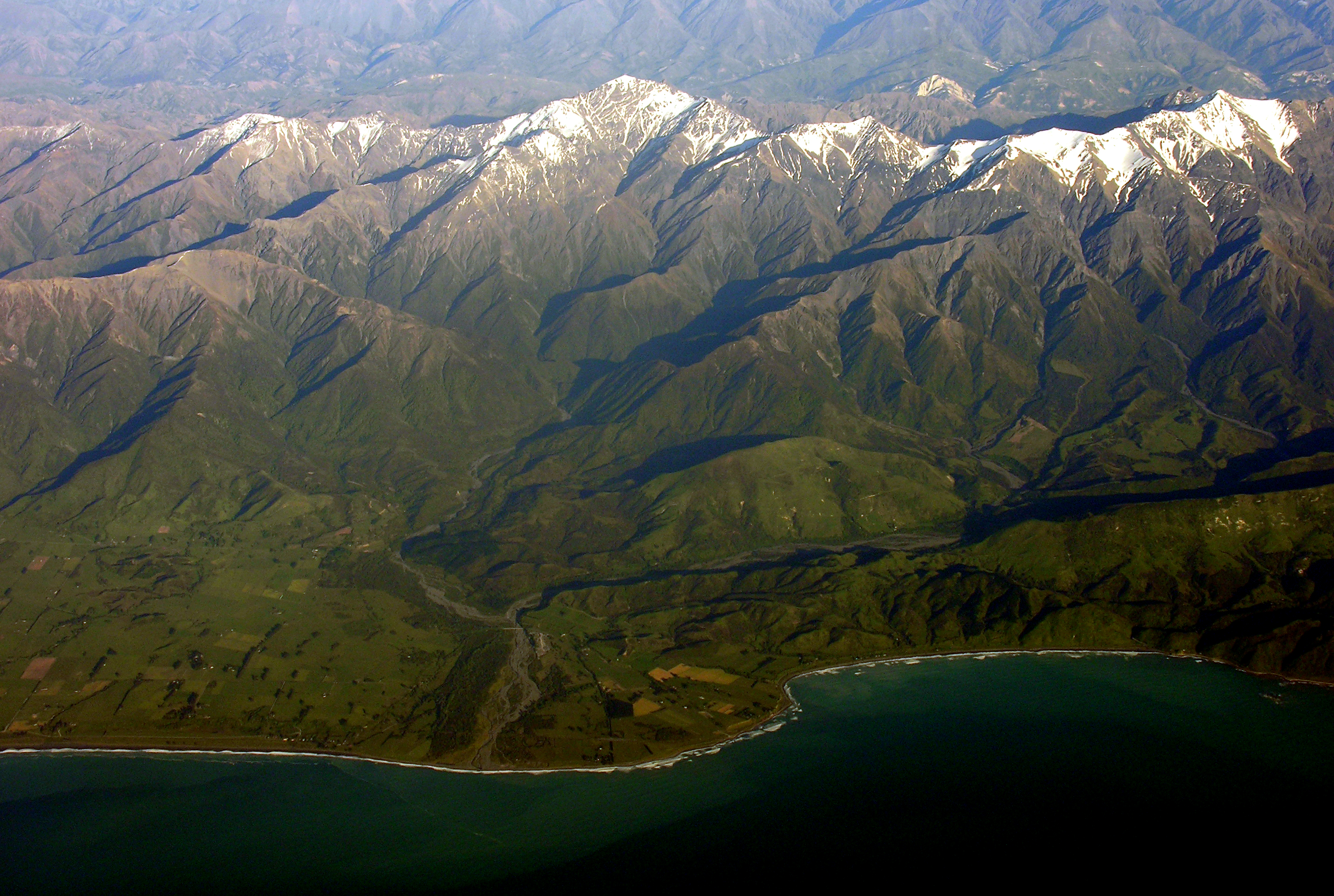
Clarence River mouth

At the time of her loss on 11 April 1886 she had 21 passengers and 29 crew on board. The Taiaroa had sailed from Wellington at 11:35 am that day and was going via Lyttelton to Port Chalmers.

From Wellington to Cape Campbell the wind was a strong north westerly. At 3pm the wind swung round suddenly to a very strong south-easterly with heavy rain and fog. The captain was on deck until 6.30pm. At about 7pm the mate advised the Captain that he could see land on the port bow. The captain returned to the bridge stopping the vessel and then going full speed astern. At about 7:30pm she grounded 50 yards from shore half a mile north of Waipapa Point near the Clarence River mouth. She was traveling at about 8-10 knots at the time. The weather was still bad with driving rain and rough seas. The outline of the hills by the coast were just visible in the dark.

The chief engineer advised the Captain that the Taiaroa was making water. Life belts were handed out to all the passengers and crew. An unsuccessful attempt was made to get a line ashore. The Captain ordered all to the four life boats, the intent being to wait until light and then make for the beach. The boats were attached by lines astern but three soon capsized in the heavy sea. A rocket was sent up and a blue light burned to show the position of the beach. Most of those thrown from the capsizing lift boats were drowned having been overcome by the cold. Had they all remained on board they would most likely have all survived.

== Rescue ==
Two passengers, Sergeant Grant of the Artillery Corp and Gilbert Hutton, reached the shore. They went to T W Trolove's Kekerangu station and raised the alarm at about 6am. The Penguin was sent from Wellington and the Wanaka from Lyttelton. The Captain's boat landed at the Wairau Bar and those on board were taken to Blenheim, arriving at 7:30am on the 12th. When Trolove and his men reached the location of the grounded steamer they found it abandoned. Three miles to its north they found bodies washed up on the shore.

== Cargo ==
The Taiaroa was carrying 50 sacks barley, 50 boxes soap, 2 cases by Thompson, Shannon and Co, 1 case from Nelson and eight bags of mail six Wellington and two from Nelson. Seven of the mailbags were recovered and the surviving cargo sold at auction by the insurance companies.

== Salvage ==
At 7am on 13 April the Penguin from Wellington arrived at the wreck and found the Wakatu and Wanaka from Lyttelton had just arrived. The ship's papers and some of the passengers belongings were retrieved from the Taiaroa by the Penguin. By low tide, in the afternoon, the Taiaroa was within 10 yards of the shore. John Harboard's monkey and Mrs Fitzgerald's cat were rescued from her by three Clarence bridge workmen. By the 19th most of the passengers luggage had been removed from the boat.

The ship was surveyed by Captain Williams for the Union Company and due to the damage it had sustained was abandoned to the underwriters. She broke in two on 22 April. An attempt was made to salvage the engines in May 1886.

== Deaths ==
In total 15 passengers and 21 crew lost their lives. Those who died were:

=== Passengers ===
- Mrs G G FitzGerald - wife of the editor of the Timaru Herald and owner of the cat found on board
- Mrs Jessie Game (or Fraser)
- William Ward, torpedo instructor
- Robert H. Vallance - bootmaker and well known racing man
- Erskine Galbraith
- George Hawker (or Hawkins)
- George Smith - magsman, had been attending the recent race meeting
- James Ferguson (or Murray) - lately on a station at Taranaki, who was going to Timaru to visit his brother
- Mr Murray, aged 55 - found on body was a birth certificate for 1860. He was on his way from Nelson to Lyttelton to meet his brother, W.S. Murray, not so long from Home
- John Harboard - magsman, had been attending the recent race meeting and owner of the monkey found on board
- E Bray
- Mr Wigley - from Wellington
- Alexander Martin - from Wellington was on his way home to Nairn, Scotland
- Mrs Gibbs - a saloon passenger
- Mr Edwards - a partner with Mr Lee of the Crown Hotel Temuka

=== Officers ===
- Robert Boyle Monkman, chief officer (identified by the papers found on his body)
- James Powell, second officer
- T Stratford, second engineer
- R Spooner - purser and son of G Spooner, Milton
- F (D or W H ) Hill - lamp trimmer (married)
- R Unwin - lamp trimmer or fireman (married)

=== Able Seamen ===
- J Jones
- E (R) McMillan - single
- Peter Hansen (or Hanes) - single
- John (William) McPhee - fireman (married)
- George McDonagh - 23 years old
- Rober Irvine - 45-year-old fireman
- J Hunter - trimmer
- R Williams - trimmer
- R Williamson (or A B)
- Robert Morrison - fireman (single)

=== Stewards ===
- T Delany
- R Bathgate
- Mrs M.A. Brown - stewardess
- G Gallichin - chief cook
- William Harris Kellan - second cook. 21 years old from Oamaru

== Survivors ==
The surviving passengers were:

- Sergeant Grant, A C Torpedo Corps
- Constable William Henry McQuartier - Permanent Torpedo Corps
- Robert Henderson
- John Harper - of Christchurch was a coach-driver on the Ferry Road
- Gilbert Hutton - Torpedo Corps of Wellington
- Thomas Olliver

The surviving crew were:

- George Thomson - captain
- Samuel Dalrymple - chief engineer
- Joseph Fielder - chief steward (married) - he died in his second shipwreck, when the Ohau foundered in 1899
- Duncan Campbell - second steward [Duncan Cameron]
- William Tain (or Cain) - donkey man (donkey engine driver) (married)
- James West (or Webb) - carpenter (single)
- John Mackay, A.B.
- William Quinn (or Quin) - ship boy
- William Kane - fireman, married

Most of those who died were buried at the Kekerangu cemetery. The exceptions were the first mate who was buried in Blenheim and the Chief Officer and the Fireman who were taken to Dunedin on the Omapere buried there. A passenger, Mr Vallance, was buried at Flaxbourne.

== Court of Enquiry ==
The Court of Enquiry commenced on 17 April under Mr Stratford, RM and Captain Morris, Nautical Assessor. It sat until 13 May. The Court found that the vessel was navigated safely up to the wind change at 3.30pm. Proper practice would have been to alter course as the ship had a light load. In addition, as the ship was on a lee shore with the wind and sea increasing, sounding should have been taken and these would have informed Captain Thomson that the ship was too close inshore. Thomson was considered negligent in failing to look at the compass and ignorant of his responsibility. Because of this his certificate was cancelled with the proviso because of his handling of the grounding that it be reissued after he served regularly at sea as mate. Costs of 16s 10d were charged against Thomson.

== Remnants ==
The Kaikōura Museum has photographs of the Taiaroa before she was wrecked and on the beach at Waipapa Point. The museum also has the cabin of the ship which is going to be restored. Inside the cabin was to be a folder with articles on the disaster, passengers, and vessel.
