= Foveaux Strait =

Strait separating the South and Stewart Islands of New Zealand

- Te Ara-a-Kiwa (Māori)
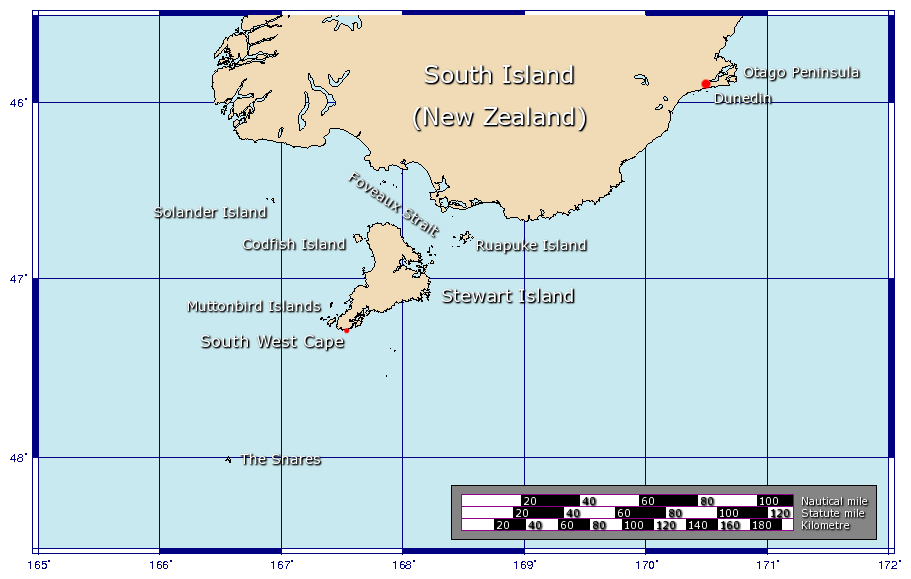

- Foveaux Strait separates the South Island and Stewart Island of New Zealand. Foveaux Strait (Oceania)
- Coordinates: 46.67°S 168.18°E
- Surface area: 2,460 square kilometres (950 sq mi)

Foveaux Strait (/foʊvoʊ/ FOH-voh; Māori: Te Ara-a-Kiwa, lit. 'the Path of Kiwa') is a strait that separates Stewart Island from the South Island of New Zealand. The width of the strait ranges from about 23 to 53 km (14 to 33 mi), and the depth varies between 18 and 46 m (59 and 151 ft). The earliest known chart of the strait was prepared by American sealer, Owen Folger Smith from a whaleboat of the sealing brig Union in 1804.

The passage was named Foveaux Strait in March 1809, after Joseph Foveaux, the Lieutenant-Governor of New South Wales in Australia. Ferry services across Foveaux Strait began in 1877 and continue to operate regularly between Bluff Harbour and Oban. The strait has been described as "one of the roughest and most unpredictable stretches of water in the world". Severe weather and sea conditions in the strait have contributed to multiple shipwrecks and fatalities. One of these losses was the wreck of the SS Tararua in 1881—the worst maritime disaster for civilian vessels in New Zealand's history, with 131 fatalities. There are currently no formal definitions of the eastern and western boundaries of the strait.

The waters of Foveaux Strait are the main location in New Zealand for dredging for Bluff oysters. There are a large number of small islands in the strait, including Ruapuke Island and the northern Muttonbird Islands. These islands are locations for muttonbirding—the harvest by Rakiura Māori of sooty shearwater (or tītī) chicks. New Zealand fur seals in the region were hunted in major seal hunting operations in the early 1800s until populations were severely depleted, and whaling was a major industry over the 40-year period from 1844 to 1885.

Foveaux Strait is known for its biodiversity, particularly seabirds and marine mammals. The region has significant populations of seven species of globally threatened seabirds, including yellow-eyed penguins. Multiple areas of coastline, islands and open sea within the strait have been recognised as Important Bird and Biodiversity Areas. Some marine mammals are resident in the strait throughout the year, while others, such as baleen whales, pass through in winter and spring on migration. The wider region also has small populations of nationally endangered dolphins, including Hector's dolphin. The Catlins Coast Marine Mammal Sanctuary lies mostly within the strait.

== Geography ==
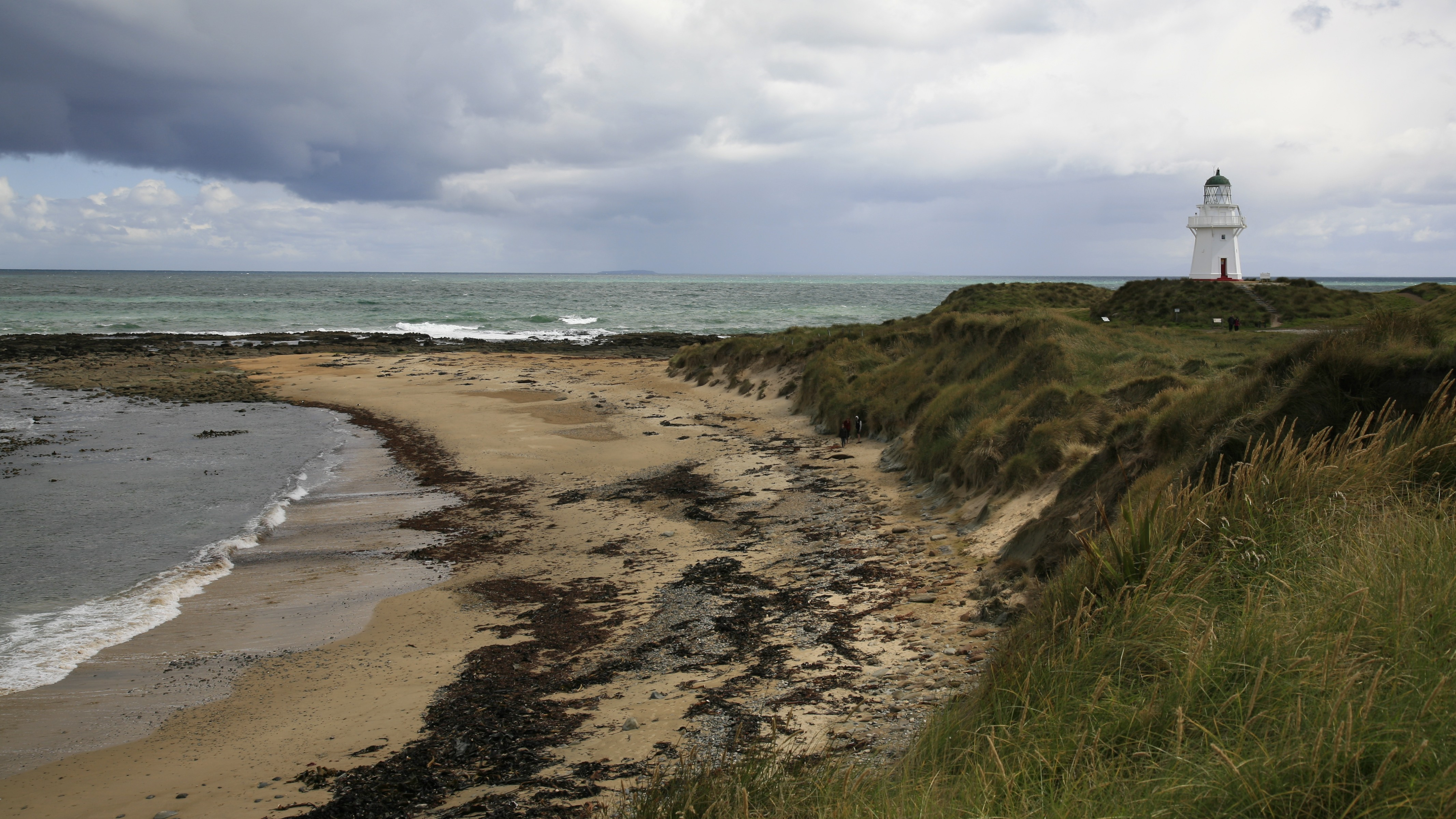
Some sources set Waipapa Point as the Foveaux Strait's boundary

=== Scope ===
Foveaux Strait is a seaway separating Stewart Island (Rakiura) from the South Island (Te Wai Pounamu) in New Zealand. The width of the strait ranges from about 23 to 53 km (14 to 33 mi). There is no formal definition of the eastern and western boundaries of the strait—different sources set the eastern boundary of the strait at Waipapa Point, or alternatively further east at Waikawa Harbour. The western boundary has been defined as a line at 167° 43'E, or further west at Sand Hill Point. Depending on the definition of eastern and western boundaries, the area of the strait is approximately 2,460 km^{2} (950 sq mi).

=== Physical geography and climate ===
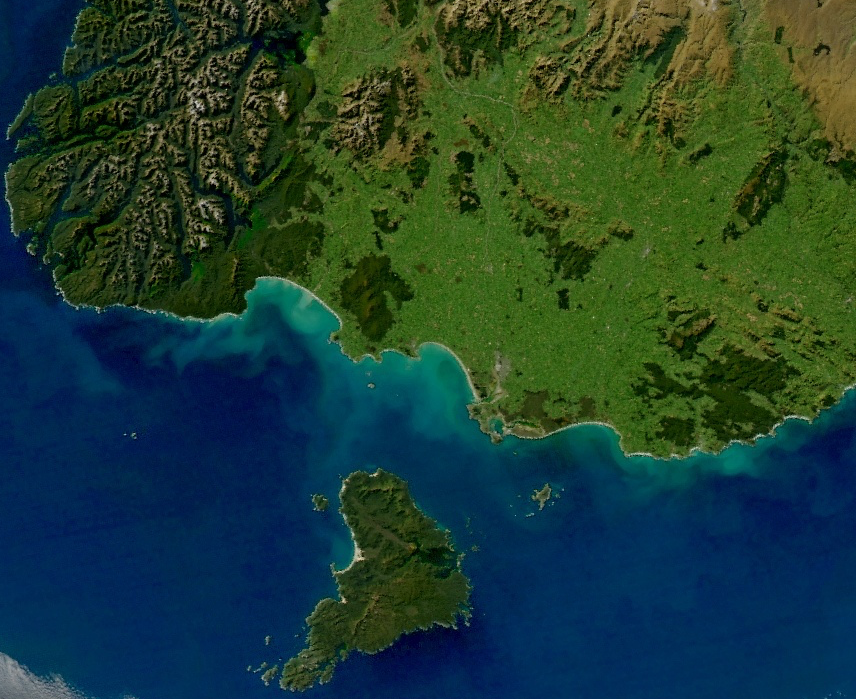
Aerial view of Stewart Island and Southland separated by the strait

There are a large number of small islands in the strait, including Raratoka Island, Dog Island, the Muttonbird Islands and Ruapuke Island. The Solander Islands lie to the west; they are outside of the area usually defined as Foveaux Strait. Major landforms on the northern coast of the strait include three large bays, Te Waewae Bay, Oreti Beach, Toetoes Bay and Bluff Harbour.

During the Last Glacial Period when sea levels were at least 100 m (330 ft) lower than current levels, the South Island and Stewart Island were connected by a coastal plain. This claim is also supported by the gravel patterns in the strait, which are distinguishable by petrographis analyses of the pebbles, that confirm the existence of dryland. After sea levels began to rise 7,000 years ago, Foveaux Strait was created between the two islands. The sea floor in the strait slopes towards the west, increasing in depth from around 18 to 46 m (59 to 151 ft). The sea floor is mostly flat with patches of coarse pebble and an upfault of bedrock close to sea level, near Te Waewae Bay. Small amounts of Stiracolpus symmetricus shells and fine sands lie nearby, which occur of the mouths of some rivers, salinities in the strait is constantly low, particularly near the river mouths of the southern coastline of the Southland, such as the Waiau River.

The climate of the Foveaux Strait region is severe by New Zealand standards with daily average temperatures of around 14 °C in summer, and 5.3 °C in winter. The annual average rainfall is more than 1,100 millimetres (43 in) and there are around 100 windy days per year. Gale force winds are common in Foveaux Strait, with a frequency that is second only to Cook Strait.

== Sea conditions ==
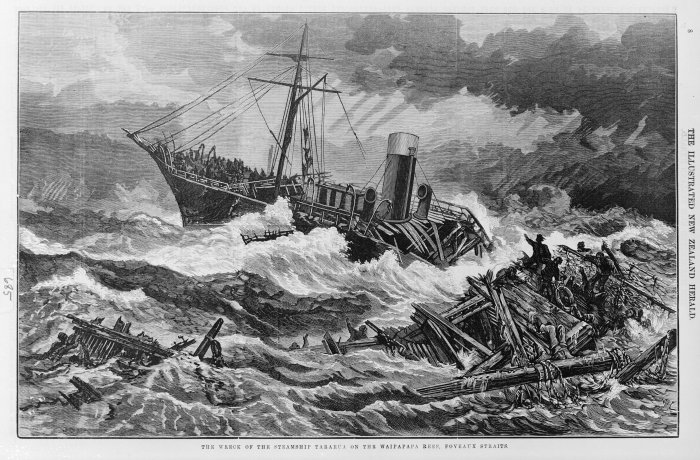
Wreck of the SS Tarurua, near Waipapa Point

The sea conditions and tidal currents in Foveaux Strait are influenced by the sub-tropical convergence zone (STCZ). This is a frontal zone between subantarctic waters to the south, and subtropical waters to the north. The southern boundary of the STCZ lies at around 46 °S, and runs eastwards from Tasmania. It gives rise to the Southland Current that flows from the continental shelf west of Stewart Island, through Foveaux Strait and then north along the coast of the South Island. The Southland Current carries a mixture of sub-tropical water and some sub-antarctic waters from the Australasian region, and it has a major influence on ocean conditions in Foveaux Strait and the south-east coast of the South Island.

Foveaux Strait has been described as "one of the roughest and most unpredictable stretches of water in the world". Strong westerly winds regularly blow through the strait of up to 130 km (81 mi) an hour, frequently creating swells with an average height of over 3 m (9.8 ft) and occasionally over 10 m (33 ft). The tidal stream in the strait can flow at speeds of 80 cm (31 in) per second and up to 120 cm (47 in) per second during spring tides. In 1850 the survey vessel HMS Acheron was caught in a gale in Foveaux Strait that lasted for five days. The vessel took shelter at Ruapuke Island, but Captain John Lort Stokes reported: "All this time the sea resembled a huge boiling cauldron, hissing and roaring, whilst its break over the numerous reefs by which the vessel was encompassed had an appearance awfully impressive when seen in the gloom of approaching night". Many whaling ships used Port William on the northwest coast of Steward Island as shelter when there was strong westerlies or severe sea conditions in Foveaux Strait.

The French navigator Jules de Blosseville on board a French expeditionary vessel Coquille, was the first person to describe the strait in detail. He wrote in 1823: "Whirlpools are frequently to be met with and the position is one of great peril when the direction of the waves is contrary to that of the wind". Blosseville also compared Foveaux Strait with Bass Strait, writing that currents were "much stronger", with the most dangerous being between Raratoka Island and the South Island, where "the flow and ebb rush through with a speed of as much as 5–6 miles (8.0–9.7 km) per hour). The combination of wind, tides and seafloor topography in Foveaux Strait can lead to steep waves, dangerous overfalls and tidal rips. Sea conditions are rough when fresh winds blow in the opposite direction to a strong tidal flow. In 2009, following several accident investigations, Maritime New Zealand arranged for warning notes to be added to charts of the area.

== Toponymy ==
The Māori name for the strait is Te Ara a Kiwa, meaning the pathway of Kiwa. A less common alternative Māori name for the strait is Te Ara a Kewa. There are numerous stories in Māori mythology about the origin of the names. In one account, Kiwa became exhausted from crossing the isthmus which connected Murihiku (Southland) and Rakiura. He asked the whale Kewa to chew through the isthmus to create a waterway, so he could travel to Rakiura using a waka.

The earliest known chart of the strait was prepared by an American sealer, Owen Folger Smith. Smith charted the strait from the whaleboat of the sealing brig Union (out of New York) in 1804; on his 1806 chart, he named it Smith's Strait. Smith's chart was given to Governor of New South Wales, Philip Gidley King, who did not make it public, even though he was duty bound to communicate all hydrographic discoveries to the Admiralty. Later in 1806, another American vessel, the Favorite, collected large amounts of sealskin from the area before continuing its journey to Sydney through the strait, leading to the passage being referred to as "Favorite's Strait" by some early maps and American logbooks.

Captain John Grono named the strait Foveaux Strait in March 1809 after his friend Joseph Foveaux, Lieutenant-Governor of New South Wales. His vessel Governor Bligh struck a rock in the strait, but suffered little damage. He described the strait as being about 36 to 40 miles (58 to 64 km) in width, and "with very dangerous navigation from the numerous rocks, shoals and little islands, with which it is crowded". The sealing brig Pegasus, commanded by Eber Bunker, ran aground in the strait in 1809, and in the report on the grounding in The Sydney Gazette, the strait was called Foveaux Strait.

In 1824, one Captain Kent of the Elizabeth Henrietta attempted to rename the strait to "Tees Strait", but was unsuccessful. A more recent proposal, in 1968, for the strait to be renamed to "Kupe Strait", was also unsuccessful.

== History ==
=== Māori settlement ===
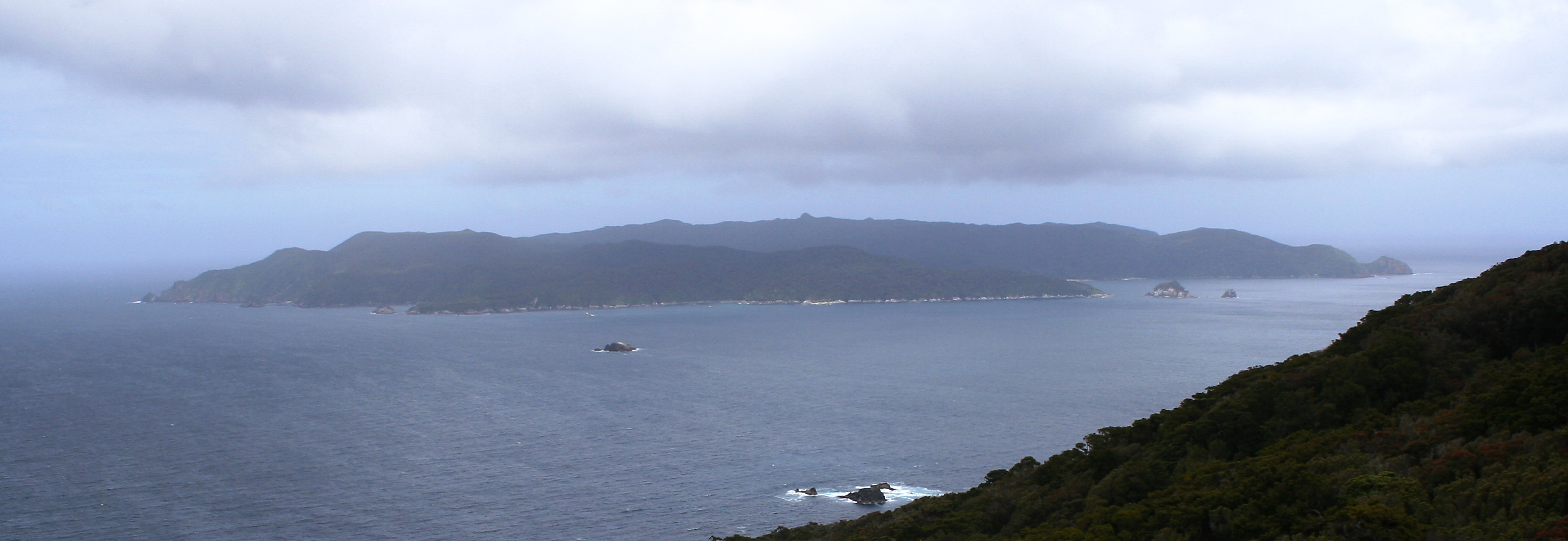
Codfish Island (Whenua Hou)

Paterson Inlet (Whaka A Te Wera)

In Māori oral tradition, their history in the Southland region is traced to the arrival of two chiefs, Rākaihautū and Tamatea. Rākaihautū is a tīpuna (ancestor) of the Waitaha people, and was the captain of the Uruao waka (canoe). The waka Tākitimu, captained by Tamatea, was wrecked near Te Waewae Bay on the shores of what is now called Foveaux Strait. In the traditional account, the Tākitimu Mountains in Southland are the overturned hull of the canoe. The name given to the lower parts of the South Island was Murihiku, a name that is loosely translated as 'the tail end' of the land.

Murihiku Māori were mostly hunter-gatherers who settled around Foveaux Strait including coastal settlements such as Bluff and Riverton, moving between inland areas and the coast, including the shores and islands of the strait. They established permanent settlements on Ruapuke Island in Foveaux Strait, and on the South Island coastline at Aparima (Riverton), Awarua (Bluff) and Waikawa. The ocean provided food year round, and tītī (mutton birds) were taken from islands off Rakiura. Groups would move inland to fish and catch eels in the rivers between late winter and into summer. In the autumn, they hunted birds including weka, kākā, takahē, kererū, and kākāpō.

Significant Māori settlements existed in the Foveaux Strait area, most notably on Ruapuke Island. It was the location of a major Ngāi Tahu settlement in the nineteenth century and was the home to southern rangatira, Tūhawaiki. He was the first of the southern chiefs to sign the Treaty of Waitangi. Ruapuke was an important site for two of the country's earliest industries, the harvesting of harakeke (flax) and fur seal skins.

The pre-colonial population is estimated at 350 Māori on the northern side of the strait, spread between the modern-day settlement of Bluff and Ruapuke Island. Stewart Island had about 85 Māori, primarily occupying Horseshoe Bay and an area referred to as Te Wehi-a-Te-Wera, a narrow peninsula of the entrance of Paterson Inlet.

In the early 19th century, Honekai, a Māori chief in the Foveaux Strait region, declared that Ngāi Tahu women and European sealers could stay together in Whenua Hou, 3 km (1.9 mi) west Stewart Island, under his protection, making it one of New Zealand's first multiracial communities. The island had previously been known as Kanawera, after a prominent Kāti Māmoe chief.

=== Cook's passage around Stewart Island ===
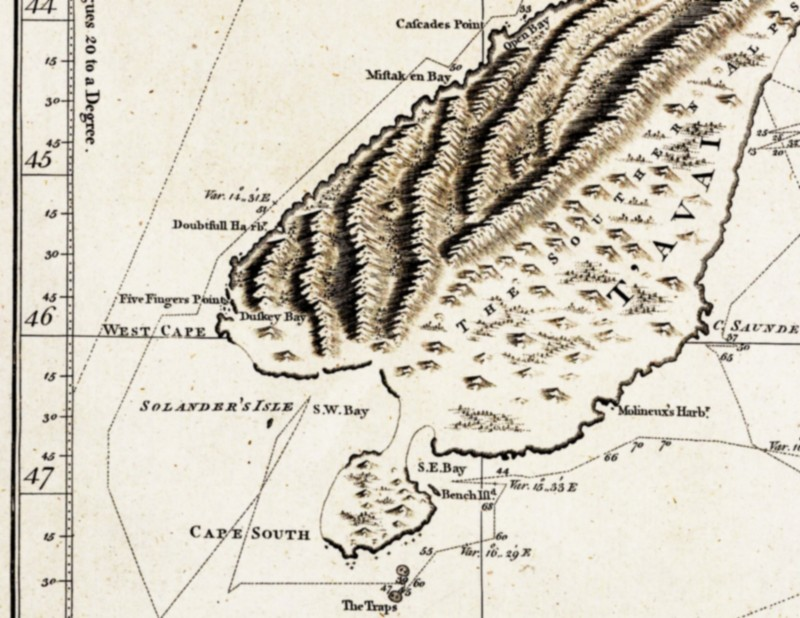
Cook believed that Stewart Island was connected to the South Island. This error was not corrected until 1804 when American sealer Owen Folger Smith charted the strait.

In March 1770, Captain James Cook, a British explorer, circumnavigated the South Island on HMS Endeavour during his first voyage to New Zealand. He passed around the southern tip of Stewart Island during this voyage, and sighted the area of Foveaux Strait, but did not record the presence of a passage. It is also possible that Cook genuinely made an error, as his focus was on finding the southern extent of New Zealand, and conditions were unfavourable for more closely exploring the possible strait.

=== Sealing ===
Māori living around Foveaux Strait hunted seals for food, and used seal skin for clothing and seal teeth for fishing hooks. The first Europeans known to have hunted seals in Southland were the crew of James Cook's vessel, HMS Resolution, during her stay in Dusky Sound in 1773. An Australian-based commercial sealing gang was dropped off in Dusky Sound in 1792 to gather seal skins. However, new opportunities for sealing in Bass Strait made New Zealand less attractive, and there was little further seal hunting by Europeans until renewed activity at Dusky Sound in 1803. Between 1805 and 1808, there were large scale seal hunting campaigns in the Antipodes Islands, Bounty Island and the Auckland Islands. From around 1808, sealing took place around Foveaux Strait. In one voyage to the strait from their base at Port Jackson (Sydney) in September 1808, the Governor Bligh, captained by John Grono, returned with 10,000 skins. Some sealing gangs spent months or years in the region and there was increased contact and trade between sealers and Māori living in the area. In one incident, a sealing gang was dropped off from the brig Fox onto Solander Island. They were left there for over four years until being picked up by the Perseverance in 1813. A few sealers took up living with Māori, and some earned high status through marriage to the daughters of chiefs. From around 1810 onwards, the seal colonies around Foveaux Strait were so depleted that large scale commercial sealing was no longer economically viable.

=== Whaling ===
Over the 40-year period 1844–1885, there were at least 187 separate visits by whaling ships to Foveaux Strait, with a peak from 1856 to 1862. An estimated 600 sperm whales were killed. Numerous shore-based whaling stations operated along the coastline of the strait. The western entrance of the Foveaux Strait (near the Solander Islands) was formerly described as "one of the world's prime sperm whale fishing ground".

=== Shipwrecks ===
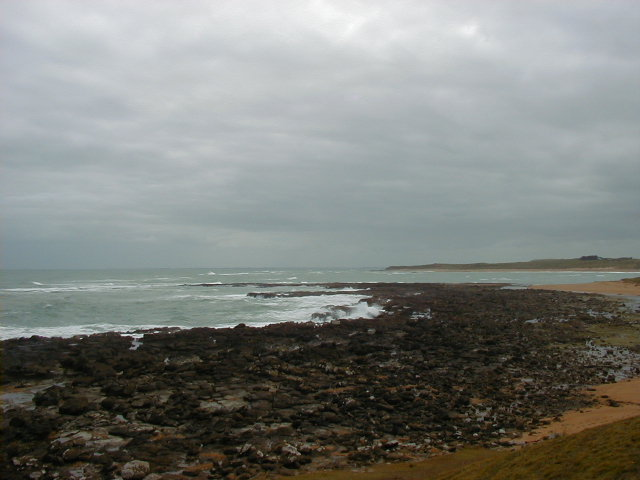
Rough sea at Waipapa Point

There is a long history of shipwrecks and vessels capsizing in Foveaux Strait. The worst incident was on 29 April 1881, when the SS Tararua struck Otara reef 13 km (8.1 mi) off Waipapa Point. Of the ship's 151 passengers, only 20 survived. This incident is the worst maritime disaster for civilian vessels in New Zealand's history. The disaster led to the establishment of a lighthouse at Waipapa Point. Serious incidents with multiple fatalities have continued into the 21st century, and the Bluff Coastguard is often called upon to assist vessels in distress in Foveaux Strait.

=== Lighthouses ===
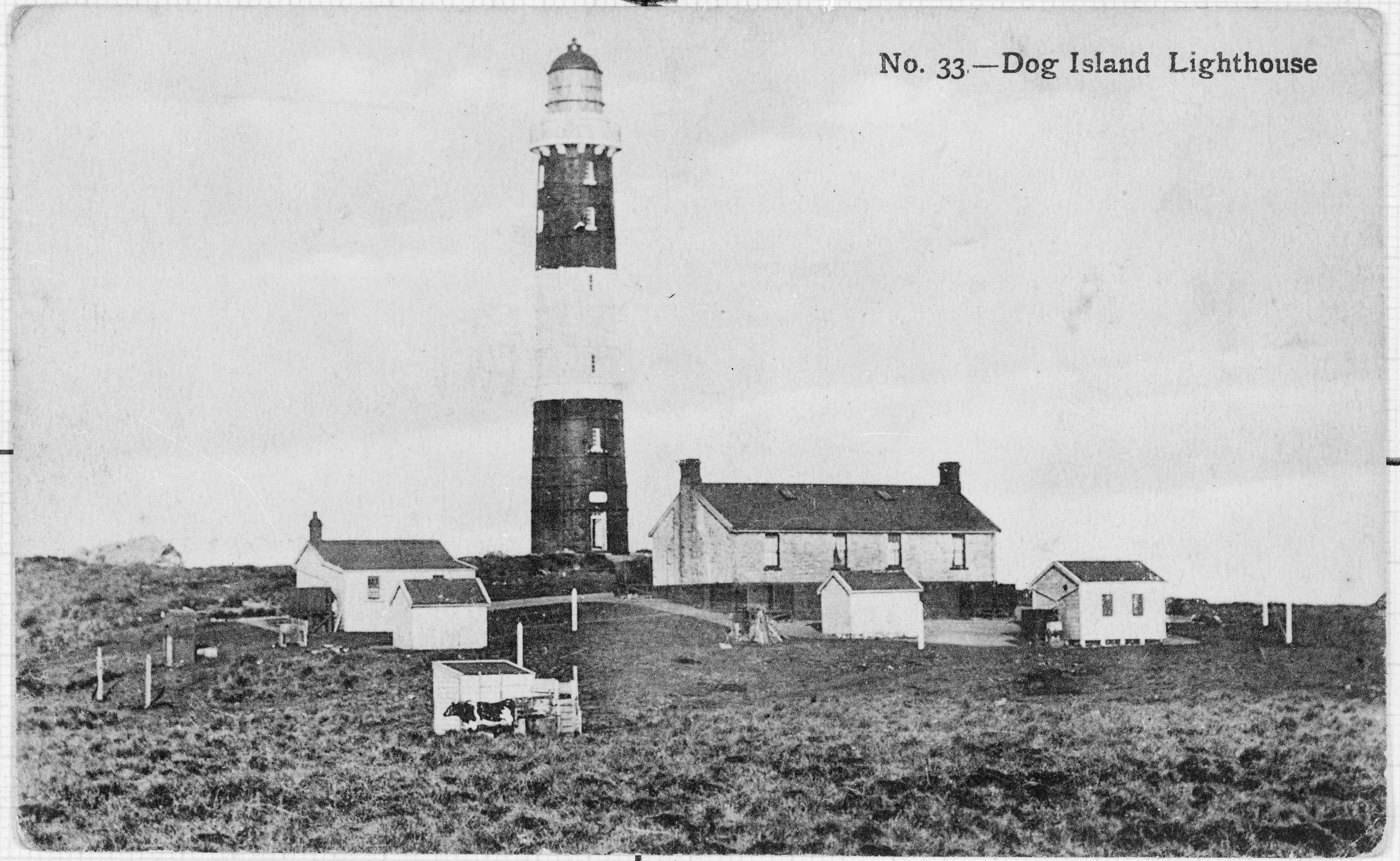
Dog Island Lighthouse in the early 1900s

From the early days of European settlement it was clear that a lighthouse was needed in Foveaux Strait. However, there were protracted debates in the 1860s about where one would be located. Captains with local experience were asked for their opinion, and they suggested possible sites on Raratoka Island, Ruapuke Island, Stewart Island, Solander Islands, and Dog Island. Captain Thomas Robertson visited Dog Island in 1863 and stated that the north-eastern edge of the island was an ideal place for a boat harbour, Robertson spoke with a local Māori chief, Tōpi Pātuki, assured Captain Robertson that there was a good water supply on the island. Later, it was chosen as Southland's first site for a lighthouse; the recommendation was made by the Invercargill Harbour Master to James Menzies, the first Superintendent of the Southland Province.

A lighthouse was also constructed on Raratoka Island (also known as Centre Island). In 1853, the island was purchased from Māori. The lighthouse tower was built from kauri timber and is 12 m (39 ft) tall and started operations from 1878. The most remote lighthouse in Southland is the Puysegur Point Lighthouse at the northwest point of the entrance to Foveaux Strait, overlooking the Tasman Sea. Operation of the light at Puysegur Point began in 1879. A further lighthouse at Waipapa Point was established in January 1884 after the sinking of SS Tararua. It is 13.4 m (44 ft) tall and was built from kauri and tōtara timber.

== Biodiversity ==
=== Seabirds ===
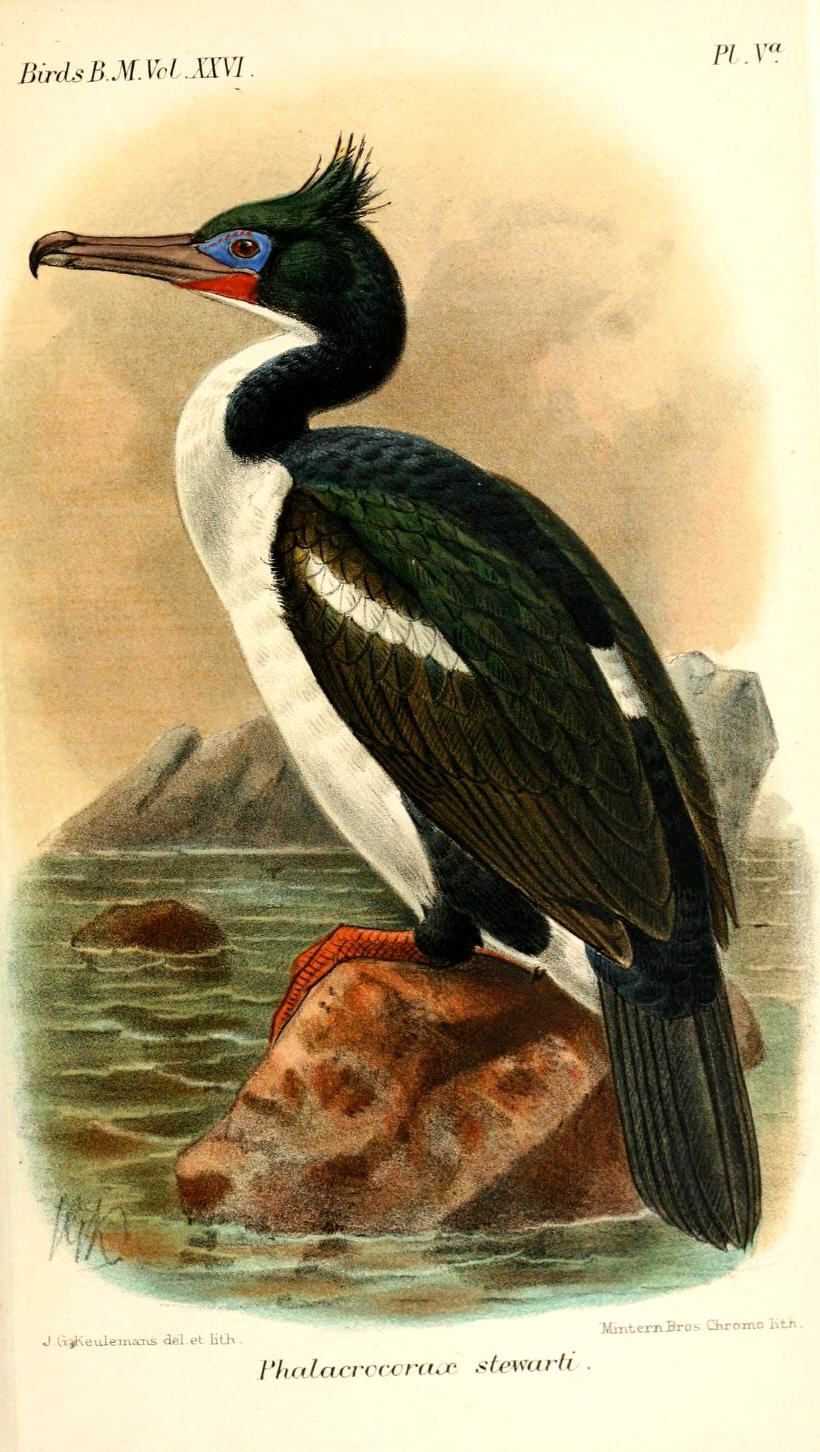
Painting of the Foveaux shag from Catalogue of the Birds in the British Museum, 1897

New Zealand has been described as the seabird capital of the world because of the large number of seabird species that breed on its territory, and the high diversity of species, including albatross, penguins, petrels and shags. Foveaux Strait is one of the key locations in New Zealand for seabirds and seabird conservation. A wide array of seabirds have been recorded in the strait, including approximately 54 different species in various families: penguins (4 species), albatrosses and mollymawks (7 species), shearwaters, petrels, and prions (25 species), gannets and shags (6 species), skuas, gulls and terns (12 species). Most notable among the penguins are the strait's population of yellow-eyed penguins.

Multiple areas in the Foveaux Strait region have been recognised as an Important Bird and Biodiversity Area (IBA) by BirdLife International. These IBAs are characterised by a large number of globally threatened seabird species, or by being locations where more than 1% of the global population of a species may be found.

The Rakiura (offshore) Important Bird Area (IBA) was designated in 2014. It covers an area of 7,811 km^{2} (3,016 sq mi) of ocean including all of Foveaux Strait, and large areas offshore from Stewart Island. The Rakiura (offshore) IBA recognises that the region has significant populations of seven species of globally threatened birds meeting the IBA criteria: Fiordland penguin, yellow-eyed penguin, northern royal albatross, Cook's petrel, mottled petrel, sooty shearwater, and the endemic Foveaux shag.

Multiple locations on islands in Foveaux Strait or the coastline of the strait have also been recognised as Important Bird Areas (IBAs). These include Bluff Harbour Awarua Bay, Fife Rock, North Coast Rakiura, northern Tītī / Muttonbird Islands, Omaui Island Oreti Estuary, Raratoka Island, and Ruapuke. The Solander Islands to the west of Foveaux Strait are another terrestrial IBA. The "trigger species" for the coastal and island IBA sites include most of the species also listed for the Rakiura (offshore) IBA; the terrestrial IBA sites recognise breeding colonies on land. The species with the largest numbers in the region is the sooty shearwater, with an estimated population of between 100,000 and 500,000 birds on the northern Tītī / Muttonbird Islands alone.

==== Muttonbirding ====
The northern Tītī / Muttonbird Islands in Foveaux Strait are one of the main locations around Stewart Island for the annual cultural harvest of chicks of tītī (sooty shearwater) by Rakiura Māori. In 2018, muttonbirders expressed concern about the impact of increasing populations of New Zealand fur seal on the annual harvest.

=== Marine mammals ===
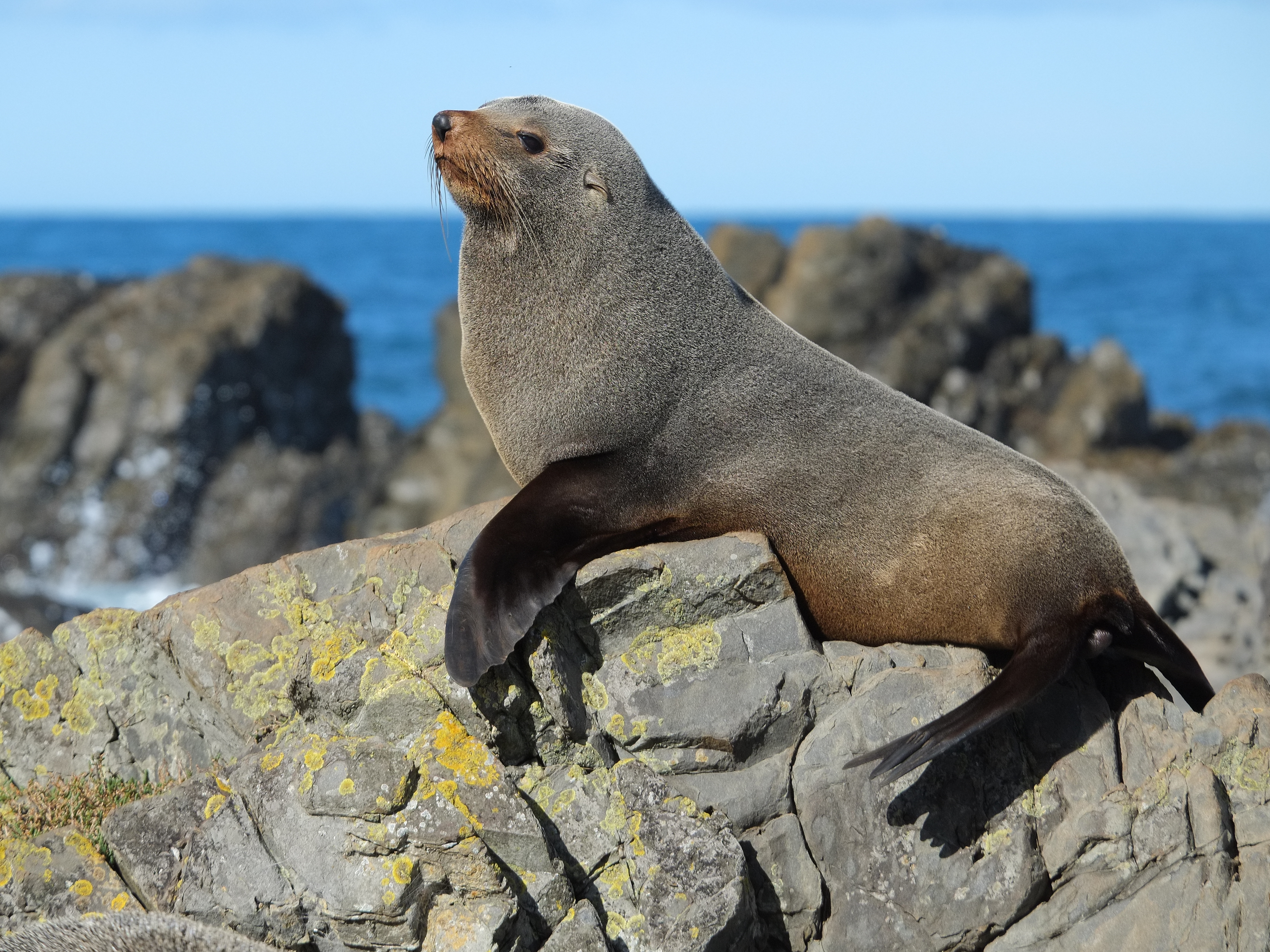
New Zealand fur seals are a common sight in the strait

Approximately 50 species of cetaceans (porpoises, dolphins and whales) and pinnipeds (sea lions and seals) are found in New Zealand waters. Of these, at least 24 species of cetacean, and four species of pinniped have been observed in the Foveaux Strait region. Some are resident throughout the year, while others, such as baleen whales, pass through Foveaux Strait in winter and spring on migration. Species of whale observed in the strait include orca, humpback whales and southern right whales. The strait is a mating area for southern right whales during winter. The wider Southland region also has small populations of nationally endangered dolphins including bottlenose and Hector's dolphin. A breeding colony of the endangered New Zealand sea lion has recently established at the southern end of Stewart Island. The New Zealand fur seal is present year-round in significant numbers. On land, sea lions are generally found on sandy beaches, but fur seals are more likely to be found on rocky shorelines.

==== Catlins Coast Marine Mammal Sanctuary ====
Marine mammals in New Zealand waters are protected under the Marine Mammals Protection Act. Additional protection has been provided in some areas with the establishment of marine mammal sanctuaries. One of these is Catlins Coast Marine Mammal Sanctuary established in 2008 that lies mostly within the area of Foveaux Strait. Seismic surveying is strictly limited in this sanctuary, and seabed mining is prohibited. The sanctuary extends from a line north of Ruapuke Island eastwards to the Brothers Point east of Waikawa Harbour.

In 2020, all of Foveaux Strait, and a large area surrounding all of Stewart Island was designated as the Rakiura Stewart Island and Te Ara a Kiwa IMMA by the international Marine Mammals Protected Areas Taskforce.

=== Insects ===
The Foveaux wētā (Deinacrida carinata) is a species of giant wētā that is endemic to New Zealand and is currently restricted to a few offshore predator-free islands including Herekopare Island in the Muttonbird Islands group in Foveaux Strait. Another endemic insect in the region is the Foveaux looper moth (Asaphodes frivola) which is a critically endangered moth, occurring in a very narrow and specialised habitat at just two small coastal sites near Invercargill, it occurs along a small area of the Southland coast, in fragmented strips of short tussock grassland right next to shell or gravel beaches.

== Fishing and aquaculture ==
=== Commercial fishing ===
The Foveaux Strait region has a nationally significant fishery for Bluff oysters and blue cod. Around half of total New Zealand catch of blue cod comes from Stewart Island or Foveaux Strait. The fish is generally caught in cod pots. The wider Southland region is also a major commercial fishery for crayfish (known elsewhere as rock lobster or spiny lobster) and pāua (known elsewhere as abalone).

=== Bluff oyster fishery ===
Bluff oysters are considered a delicacy in New Zealand, particularly in the southern parts of the country. Oysters found in Foveaux Strait are also found around other parts of New Zealand. However, only in Foveaux Strait are the quantities of Bluff oyster sufficient to sustain a commercial fishery. It is one of the oldest industries in New Zealand. The Bluff oyster fishery is nationally significant and provides socio-economic benefit to neighbouring settlements. The oysters are harvested by a fleet of dredging boats—mostly operating from Bluff Harbour—between March and August each year. Oystering began on Stewart Island in the 1860s, and gradually moved into the strait with the discovery of larger oyster beds there in 1879. The oyster quota was severely reduced in recent years due to the effects of phytoplankton variability on the oyster beds, and the effects of toxic protozoan parasites such as Bonamia ostreae. These issues led to a rāhui being placed by local iwi in 2021.

=== Customary fisheries management areas ===
Under the Treaty of Waitangi, tangata whenua (people of the land), are guaranteed customary fishing rights. For the Foveaux Strait region, these rights are protected by regulations that provide for areas of traditional fishing grounds to be declared as a mātaitai reserve, where tangata whenua are guardians and may issue bylaws, and commercial fishing is not normally permitted. Mātaitai reserves within Foveaux Strait include:

- Kaihuka (inshore waters surrounding Kaihuka Island in the northern Tītī / Muttonbird Islands group)
- Motupōhue (an inshore area around the Bluff peninsula)
- Oreti (an inshore area along Oreti Beach)
- Ōmāui (an inshore area around the Ōmāui headland northwest of Bluff)
- Ōtara (an inshore area north of Waipapa Point)
- Pikomamaku (a section of inshore waters around Pikomamaku (Women's Island), in the northern Tītī / Muttonbird Islands group)

In 2023, whānau associated with Ruapuke Island applied for a mātaitai reserve surrounding the island, in response to excessive harvesting by recreational fishers that has caused a decline in the local stocks of finfish and shellfish.

=== Aquaculture ===
A land-based aquaculture facility operates at Ocean Beach near Bluff, on the shores of Foveaux Strait. It has large tanks, and uses water from the strait to raise popular New Zealand species including hāpuku, kingfish, whitebait and pāua. The facility was developed from 2018 using a collection of buildings that were originally a large abattoir and meat processing factory that closed in 1991. In May 2021, a seafood company owned by Ngāi Tahu applied for consents to establish salmon farms in Foveaux Strait. The proposal covered an area of 2,500 hectares (6,200 acres), located 2 to 6 km (1.2 to 3.7 mi) off the north–east coast of Stewart Island. The consent application was reviewed by an independent panel under "fast-track" legislation and was declined in August 2023, based on the likely environmental impact.

== Transport ==
=== Ferry services ===
Foveaux Strait ferry crossing

The ferry journey across Foveaux Strait between Bluff Harbour on the South Island and Oban in Stewart Island is about 39 km (21 nmi) long. The first scheduled service across Foveaux Strait began in 1877 for weekly mail delivery, but soon also carried passengers and general cargo. The Bluff Harbour Board and central government provided subsidised ferry services to Stewart Island for 100 years from 1885 through until 1985, when private operators took over the service. The present high speed catamaran service typically takes one hour. As of 2024, the ferry service is operated by the tourism company RealNZ (formerly Real Journeys).

=== Shipping ===
A wide range of vessels travel through Foveaux Strait, ranging from small fishing vessels through to cruise ships, large cargo ships and tankers. Vessels travelling between international ports may pass through Foveaux Strait based on the rights of innocent passage defined in the United Nations Convention on the Law of the Sea. Most vessels transiting through the strait pass to the north of Ruapuke Island.

For transport of freight between Bluff and Oban, the ferry service carries light freight, and Rakiura Shipping provides a general freight service.

=== Air services ===
Stewart Island Flights provides air services across Foveaux Strait between Invercargill Airport and Ryan's Creek Aerodrome on Stewart Island. Their aircraft also land on the sand at Mason Bay, Doughboy Bay, and West Ruggedy Beach.

In 1950, a licence was granted to Amphibian Airways to operate an air service between Invercargill and Stewart Island. The inaugural flight to Half Moon Bay was made on 20 March 1951, with plans for a weekly service. In March 1979, the island's only airstrip was opened at Ryan's Creek above Oban. Services from Invercargill were provided using Nomad and Britten-Norman Islander aircraft. In 1998, a Southern Air Cessna ditched into Foveaux Strait on a trip from Stewart Island to Invercargill after losing power to both engines, resulting in five deaths.

== Swimming ==
Few people have swum across the Foveaux Strait, mostly due to the unpredictable weather conditions and great white sharks residing in the area. The strait crossing distance is roughly 30 km (19 mi). The first known person to swim across the strait was John van Leeuwen, who completed it on 7 February 1963 in a time of 13 hours 40 minutes. The first woman to swim the strait was New Zealander Meda McKenzie who completed the crossing on 20 March 1979.
