= Cape Palliser Lighthouse =

Lighthouse in New Zealand

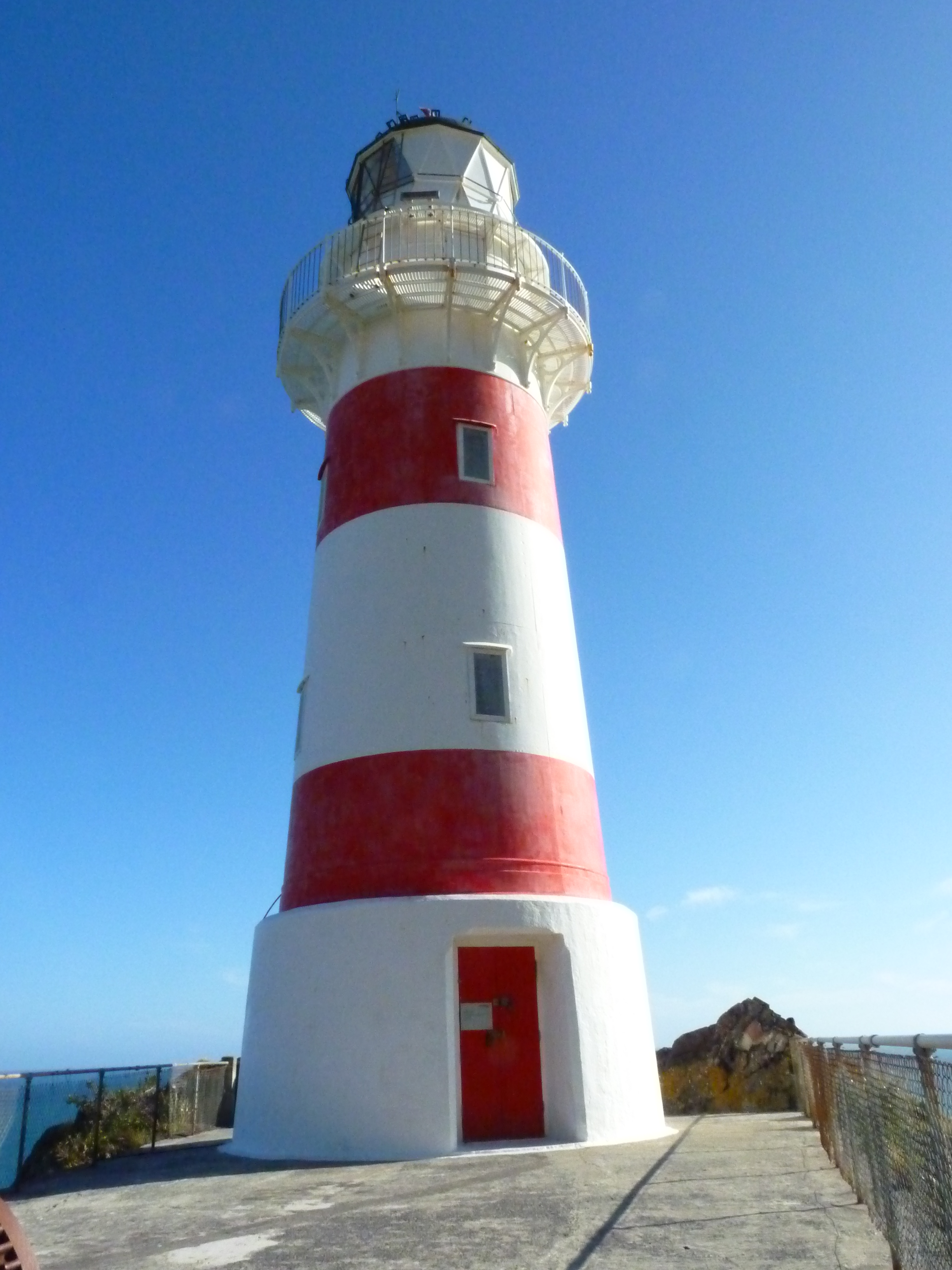
- Location: Cape Palliser; North Island; New Zealand
- Coordinates: 41°36′42.9″S 175°17′23.8″E

Tower
- Constructed: 1897
- Construction: cast iron tower
- Automated: 1986
- Height: 18 metres (59 ft)
- Shape: cylindrical tower with balcony and lantern
- Markings: white and red horizontal bands tower, white lantern, black lantern dome
- Power source: mains electricity
- Operator: Maritime New Zealand

Light
- Focal height: 78 metres (256 ft)
- Lens: second order Fresnel lens
- Range: 26 nautical miles (48 km; 30 mi)
- Characteristic: FL(2) W 20s

Cape Palliser Lighthouse is a lighthouse at Cape Palliser in the Wellington region of the North Island of New Zealand. It is owned and operated by Maritime New Zealand.

The light was built in 1897 and was originally fuelled by oil. In 1954 the oil lamp was replaced with an electric one powered by a local diesel generator. This was subsequently replaced by a connection to the mains grid in 1967, although a diesel generator is retained for emergency power. The light was fully automated in 1986 and is now managed from a control room in Wellington.

The base of the lighthouse is reached via a staircase with 258 steps, up a 58-metre-high cliff. This staircase – built in 1912 – replaced a dangerous dirt track.

Cape Palliser lighthouse is one of three New Zealand lighthouses with a distinct striped paint scheme; the other two are Dog Island Lighthouse and Cape Campbell Lighthouse, which both have black and white stripes.

== See also ==
- List of lighthouses in New Zealand
