= Dog Island (New Zealand) =

Island in New Zealand

Māori: Motu Piu
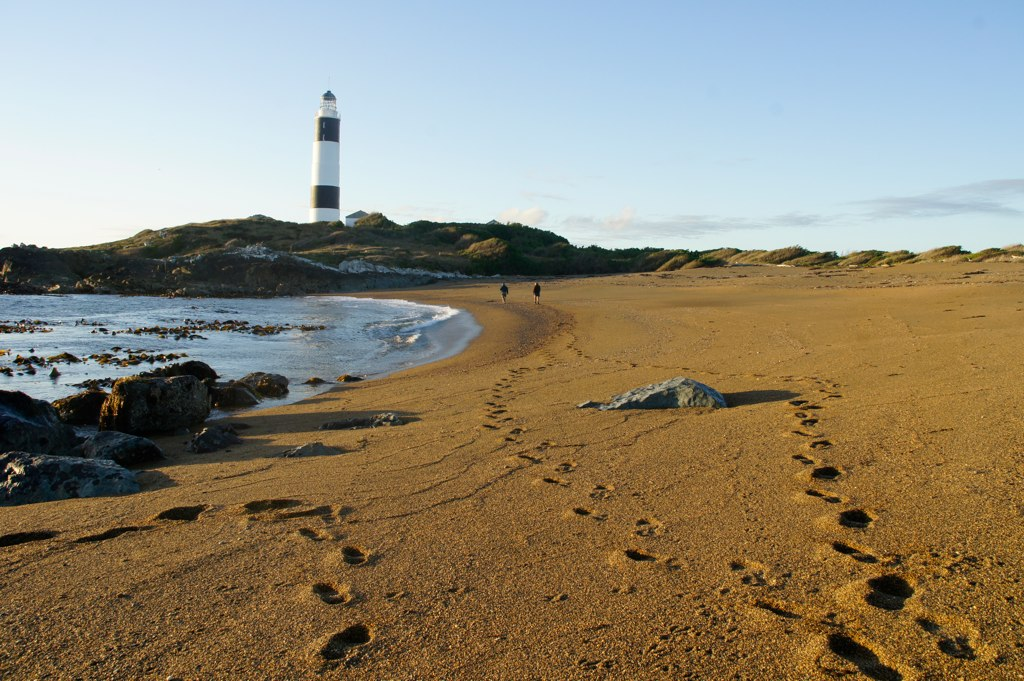
- View of a beach and the lighthouse of Dog Island

- Location within New Zealand

Geography
- Location: Foveaux Strait
- Coordinates: 46°39′00″S 168°24′30″E
- Total islands: 1
- Area: 0.11 km^{2} (0.042 sq mi)
- Highest elevation: 15 m (49 ft)

Administration
- New Zealand

Demographics
- Population: 0

Dog Island (Motu Piu in Māori) is located in Foveaux Strait some 5 kilometres (3.1 mi) from Bluff, New Zealand. It holds New Zealand's tallest lighthouse and since the maritime structure was fully automated in 1989, the island has been uninhabited.

== Etymology ==
The name of the island is thought to be descriptive, with the shape of the island appearing like a dog, and the reef on the north-west corner of the island being locally known as the Dog's Tongue. The Māori name (motu: island, and piu: to swing) refers to Māori legend of a large pounamu turning into this island.

== Geography ==
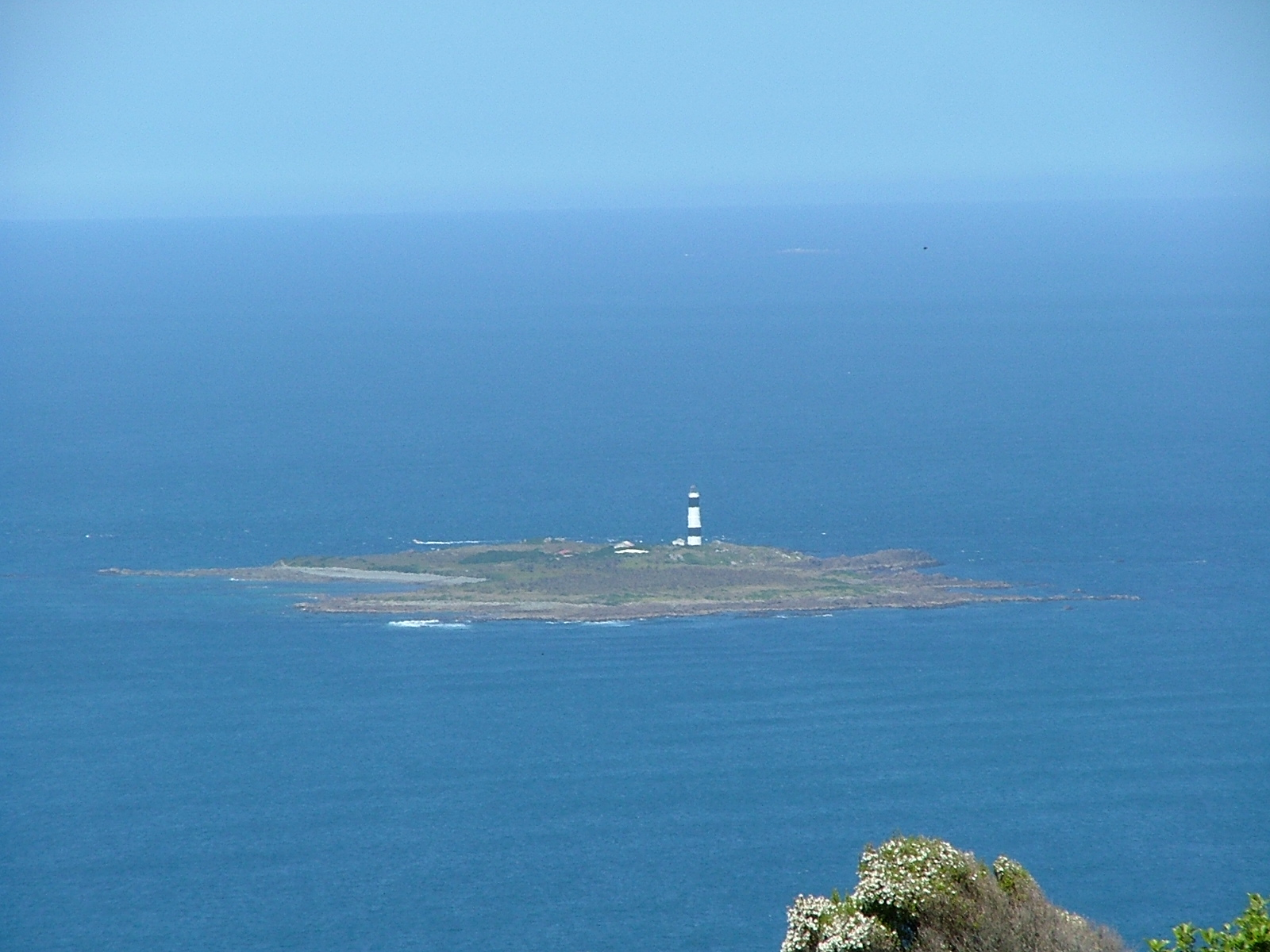
Dog Island as seen from Bluff Hill

Dog Island is low-lying and rocky, and its highest (natural) point is about 15 metres (49 ft) above sea level. The size of the island is 28 acres (0.11 km^{2}).

== Dog Island Lighthouse ==
After long discussions, the island was chosen as Southland's first site for a lighthouse; the recommendation was made by the Invercargill Harbour Master to James Alexander Robertson Menzies, the first Superintendent of the Southland Province. The lighthouse was designed by James Balfour, at the time marine engineer to the Otago Provincial Council and later to the Colonial Government of New Zealand, at a total height of 36 metres (118 ft); due to the low-lying nature of the island, the lighthouse had to be quite tall to be effective.

The lighthouse on Dog Island was first operated in August 1865. There were originally three lighthouse keepers with their families on the island. The initial rotating light mechanism had to be wound up hourly, and in 1883, the principal lighthouse keeper died when he fell down the central shaft trying to attach weights to the mechanism. Later, only one keeper lived on the island with his family. The lighthouse was automated in 1989, and the island has since been uninhabited. The lighthouse is the tallest lighthouse in New Zealand, and one of its oldest. Due to its black and white stripes, it might be one of New Zealand's most distinctive lighthouses. The lighthouse is registered by Heritage New Zealand as a Category I structure, with registration number 395.

Despite the lighthouse, the steamer SS Waikouaiti ran aground on 28 November 1939 during dense fog and was wrecked.

Due to its remote location, children could not attend school on the mainland, and supplies arrived by ship every three months. A landing strip was built so that fortnightly supplies could arrive by plane.

== Today ==
There is no public access to Dog Island, but it can be seen from Bluff on a clear day. A Dog Island Motu Piu Charitable Trust has formed to work on heritage preservation and public education. As the island is free of introduced mammalian predators, the trust also plans to reintroduce native species such as tuatara, kiwi and Sooty shearwater to the island. Sarah Dowie, Member of Parliament for the Invercargill electorate, is the current deputy chair of the trust. The trust's work was recognised in 2012 in the inaugural Environment and Conservation Awards. Cetaceans such as southern right whales can be spotted around the island during migration seasons.

== See also ==
- Desert island
- List of islands
