= Kiwa (mythology) =

Several male legends in Māori mythology

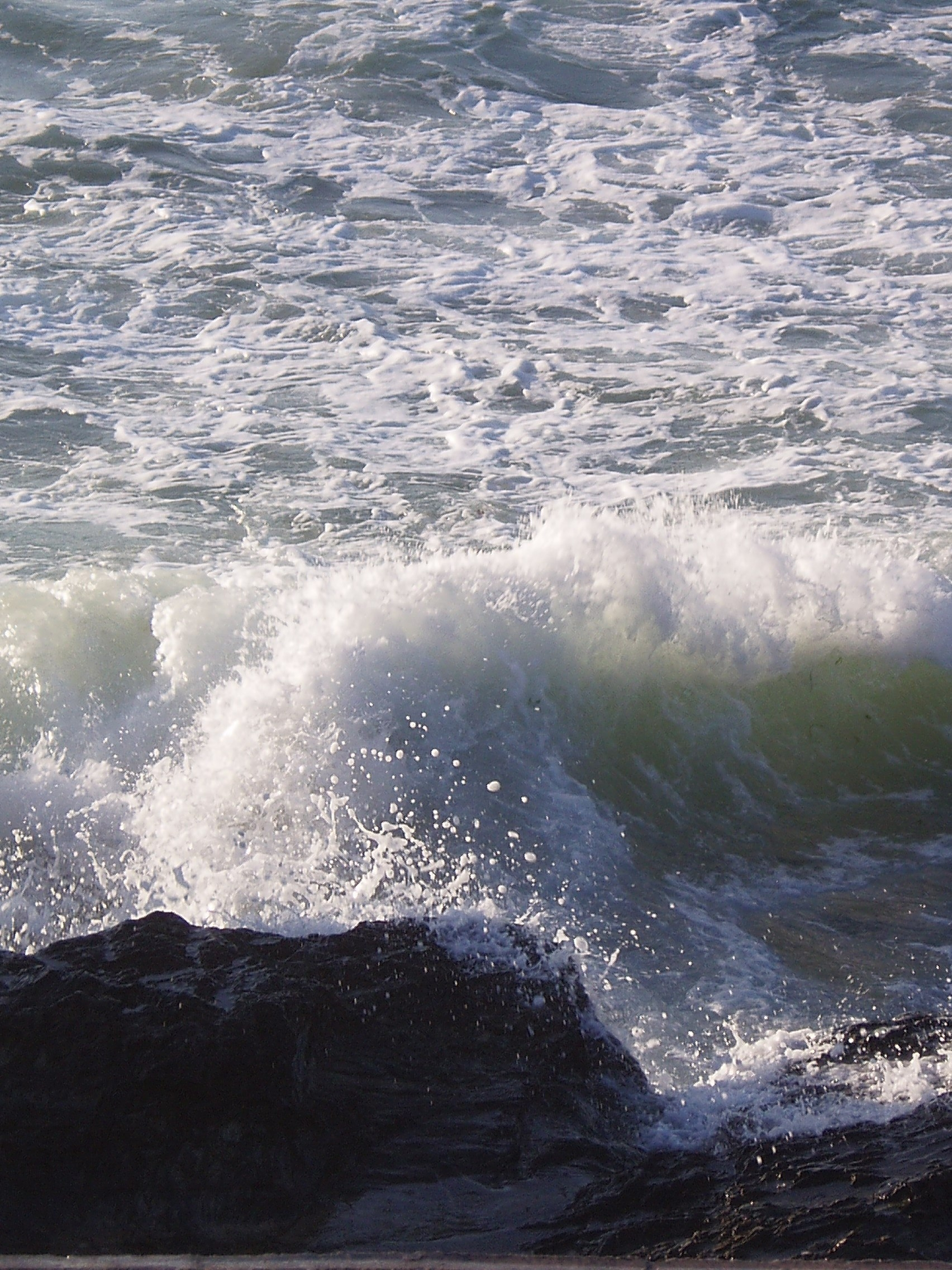
Waves of Hinemoana are eroding the land

Kiwa is one of several male divine guardians of the ocean in the traditions of some Māori iwi tribes of the East Coast of the North Island of New Zealand.

A poetic name for the Pacific Ocean is Te moana nui a Kiwa (The great ocean of Kiwa). Kiwa's first wife, in some of these traditions, was Parawhenuamea, ancestor of streams that flow from the land to the sea and of fresh water generally. Kiwa's second wife was Hinemoana (Ocean woman), a personification of the sea. Kiwa and Hinemoana had a number of children.

== Children ==
The names and numbers of their children vary in different accounts. One version names ten children and for most of these, gives details about the creatures they gave rise to:

1. Pipihura, ancestor of the cockle.
2. Te Uru-kahikahika, source of eels, lampreys and frostfish.
3. Wharerimu, ancestor of seaweed.
4. Hine-tapiritia, ancestor of certain molluscs and oysters.
5. Te Raengawha, origin of sea urchins, as well as various fishes.
6. Te Kiri-pakapaka, origin of the snapper and the gurnard.
7. Whatu-maomao, whose offspring include the grouper, the kingfish, and the kahawai.
8. Te Kohurangi
9. Kapuwai
10. Kaiwahawera, ancestor of the octopus.

Others say that Kiwa is the brother of Hinemoana, or her guardian. Some Māori tribes have stories in which Hinemoana is married to Rangi, the god of the sky. This causes jealousy on the part of Papa, the earth mother, another of Rangi's wives. The enmity between Hinemoana and Papa is shown in the way the sea is constantly attacking and eroding the land. In other areas of New Zealand, traditions about the guardians of the sea and the origin of its creatures were very different. For instance in the Mataatua canoe area, (the eastern Bay of Plenty) it appears that Hinemoana was unknown; their traditions concern a female deity named Wainui (Great Water) instead.

== Shellfish family Kiwaidae ==
The shellfish family Kiwaidae are named after 'Kiwa, the goddess of shellfish in Polynesian Mythology'. This description of Kiwa is inaccurate, given that Māori sources all agree that Kiwa is a male guardian of the sea.
