= Raratoka Island =

Island in Foveaux Strait, New Zealand

- Interactive map of Raratoka Island

Geography
- Location: Foveaux Strait, Southland Region
- Coordinates: 46.433°S 167.858°E
- Area: 86 ha (210 acres)

Administration
- New Zealand

Demographics
- Population: 0

Raratoka Island (also known as Centre Island) is a small island of 86 hectares (210 acres) in Foveaux Strait off the coast of Stewart Island / Rakiura, New Zealand. It is located 25 kilometres (16 mi) north of Stewart island's northernmost point, Black Rock Point, and 15 kilometres (9.3 mi) southwest of the Southland town of Riverton on the South Island mainland. Several small reefs surround the island, notably Escape Reefs, 5 kilometres (3.1 mi) to the east, and Hapuka Rock, 2 kilometres (1.2 mi) to the southwest.

The island was named by Māori after the island of Rarotonga, and is the Southern Māori form of the same word, meaning "beneath the south" or "south wind".

Raratoka Island is used as an island sanctuary, with the Department of Conservation releasing 15 captive-bred birds in 2006 after eradicating the population of Polynesian rats. The island contains a lighthouse and a small airstrip.
