= Cape Campbell =

Cape Campbell Māori: Te Rae-o-te-kōhaka
- Cape
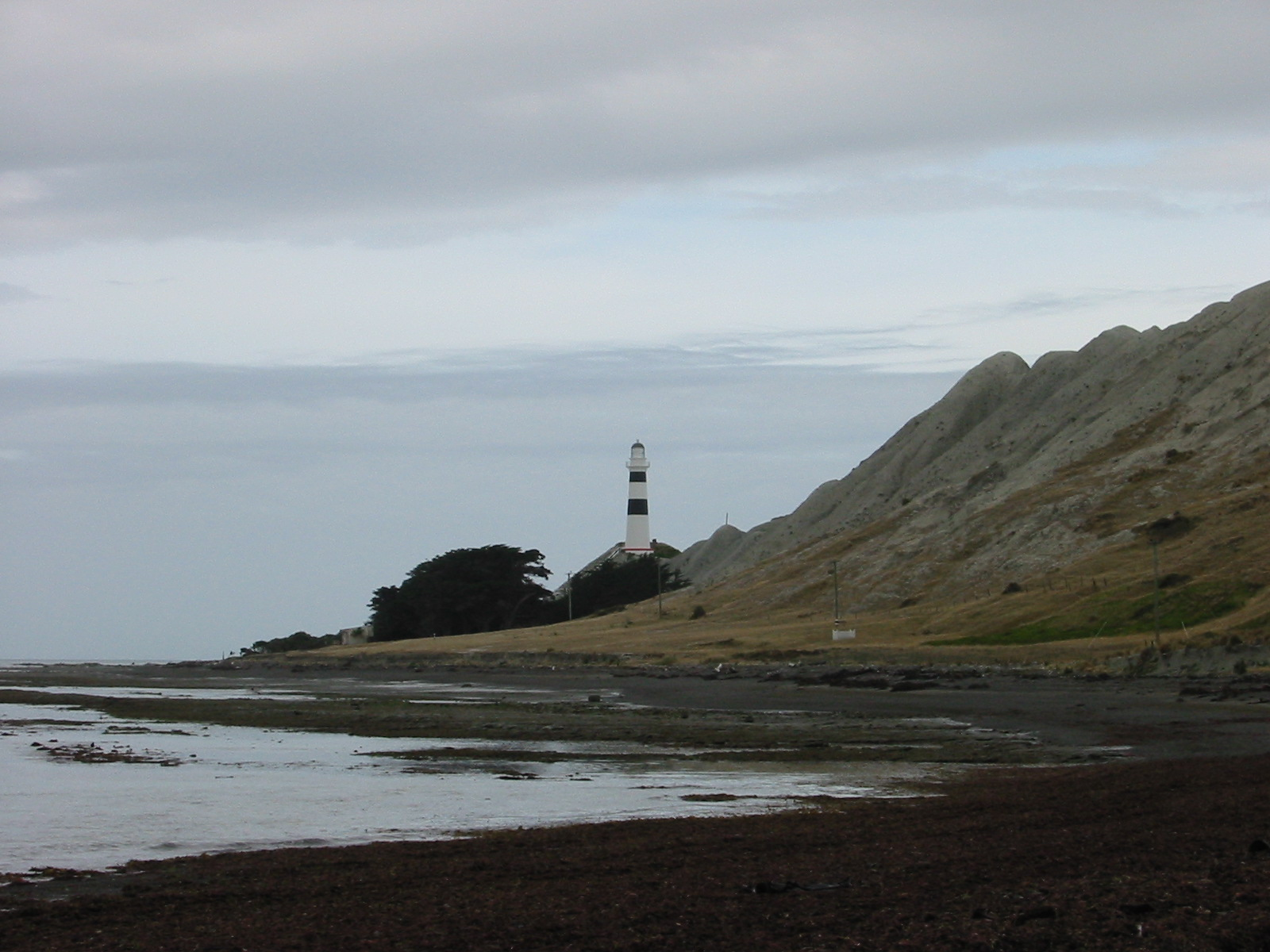

- Location within New Zealand
- Coordinates: 41.726°S 174.2760°E

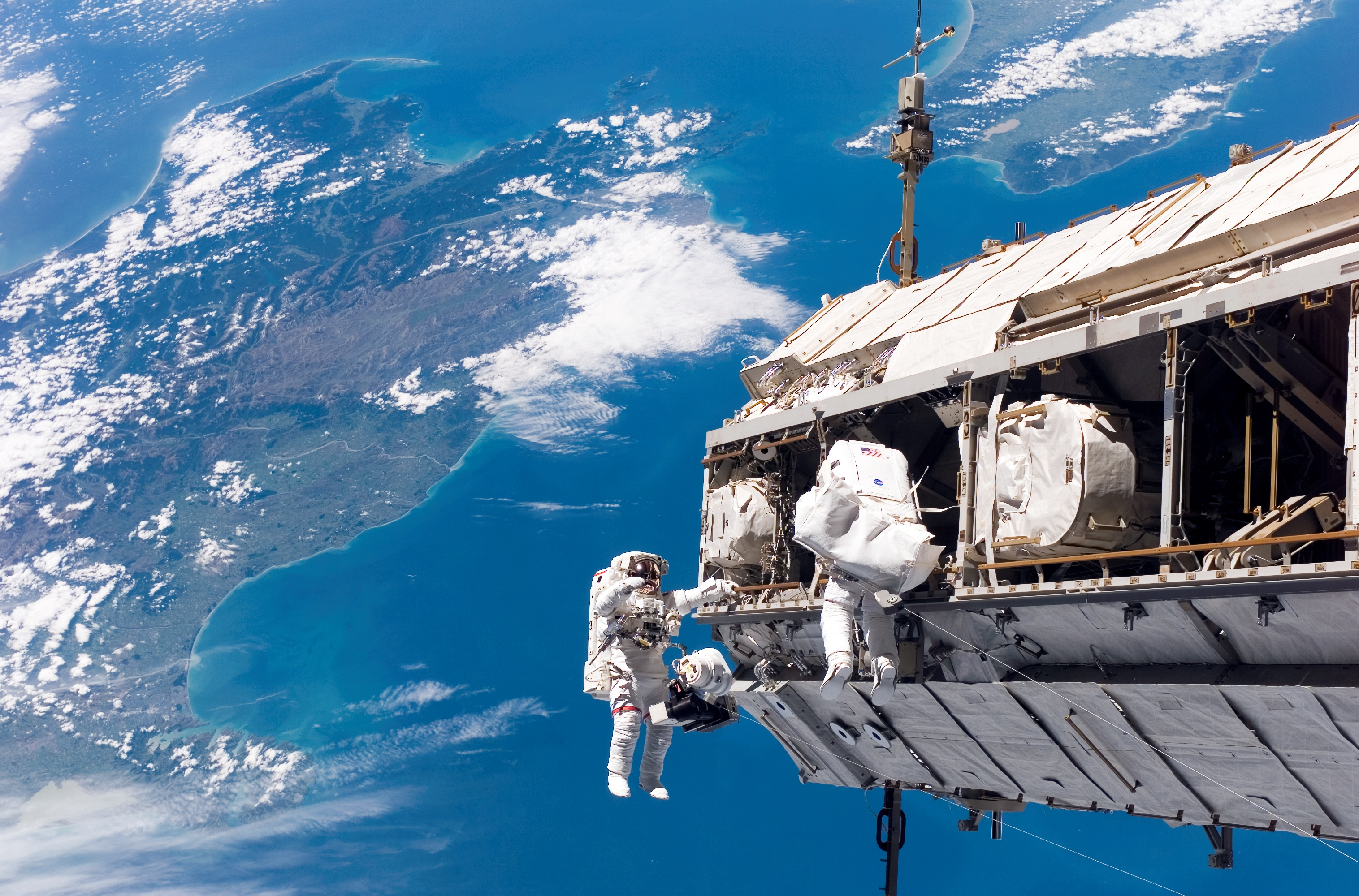
A different perspective on Cape Campbell from STS 116 travelling overhead during December 2006

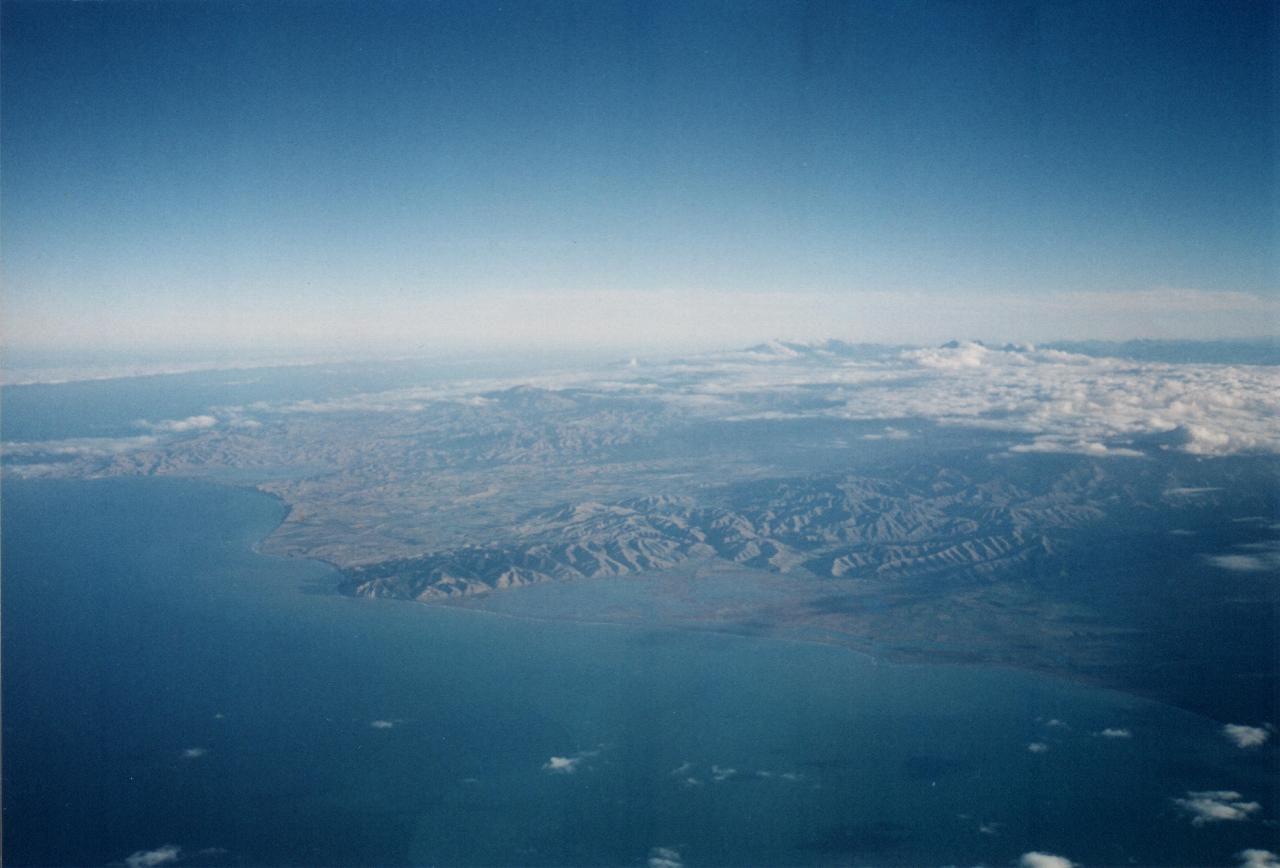
View of Cape Campbell South Island New Zealand

Cape Campbell (Māori: Te Rae-o-te-kōhaka) is in Marlborough, New Zealand, on the northeastern coast of the South Island. It lies at the southern end of Clifford Bay, 15 kilometres (9 mi) northeast of Ward, and 42 kilometres (26 mi) southeast of Blenheim. Cape Campbell lies close to the salt works at Lake Grassmere / Kapara Te Hau.

It is the third-easternmost point of the South Island, at a longitude of about 174^{o}16.5' East. (The two easternmost points are West Head (it is the western shore of the opening to Tory Channel / Kura Te Au - the opposing shore being on Arapaoa Island), and Cape Jackson (between the entrances to Queen Charlotte Sound and Port Gore), both at a longitude of 174^{o}19' east.)

It was named by Captain James Cook after Captain (later Vice-Admiral) John Campbell, who had been a strong supporter of Cook's as Observer for the Royal Society.

The cape was chosen as the location for a lighthouse following several wrecks in the area, including that of the Alexander in 1858 in which one person drowned. The first lighthouse on the cape was lit in 1870, however the construction was soon found to be faulty and a replacement was built in 1905. The Cape Campbell Lighthouse continued to be staffed until 1986, when it was fully automated.

== Climate ==
Climate data for Cape Campbell (1991–2020)
Month	Jan	Feb	Mar	Apr	May	Jun	Jul	Aug	Sep	Oct	Nov	Dec	Year
Mean daily maximum °C (°F)	18.8 (65.8)	18.8 (65.8)	17.7 (63.9)	15.9 (60.6)	14.2 (57.6)	12.3 (54.1)	11.4 (52.5)	11.8 (53.2)	13.1 (55.6)	14.5 (58.1)	15.8 (60.4)	17.5 (63.5)	15.2 (59.3)
Daily mean °C (°F)	16.4 (61.5)	16.6 (61.9)	15.5 (59.9)	13.8 (56.8)	12.2 (54.0)	10.2 (50.4)	9.4 (48.9)	9.8 (49.6)	11.0 (51.8)	12.1 (53.8)	13.4 (56.1)	15.2 (59.4)	13.0 (55.3)
Mean daily minimum °C (°F)	14.1 (57.4)	14.3 (57.7)	13.4 (56.1)	11.7 (53.1)	10.1 (50.2)	8.1 (46.6)	7.4 (45.3)	7.7 (45.9)	8.8 (47.8)	9.8 (49.6)	11.1 (52.0)	12.9 (55.2)	10.8 (51.4)
Average rainfall mm (inches)	41.5 (1.63)	37.0 (1.46)	37.1 (1.46)	36.8 (1.45)	46.9 (1.85)	63.1 (2.48)	59.1 (2.33)	44.7 (1.76)	44.2 (1.74)	39.2 (1.54)	36.2 (1.43)	40.3 (1.59)	526.1 (20.72)
Source: NIWA
