= Cape Campbell Lighthouse =

Lighthouse in New Zealand

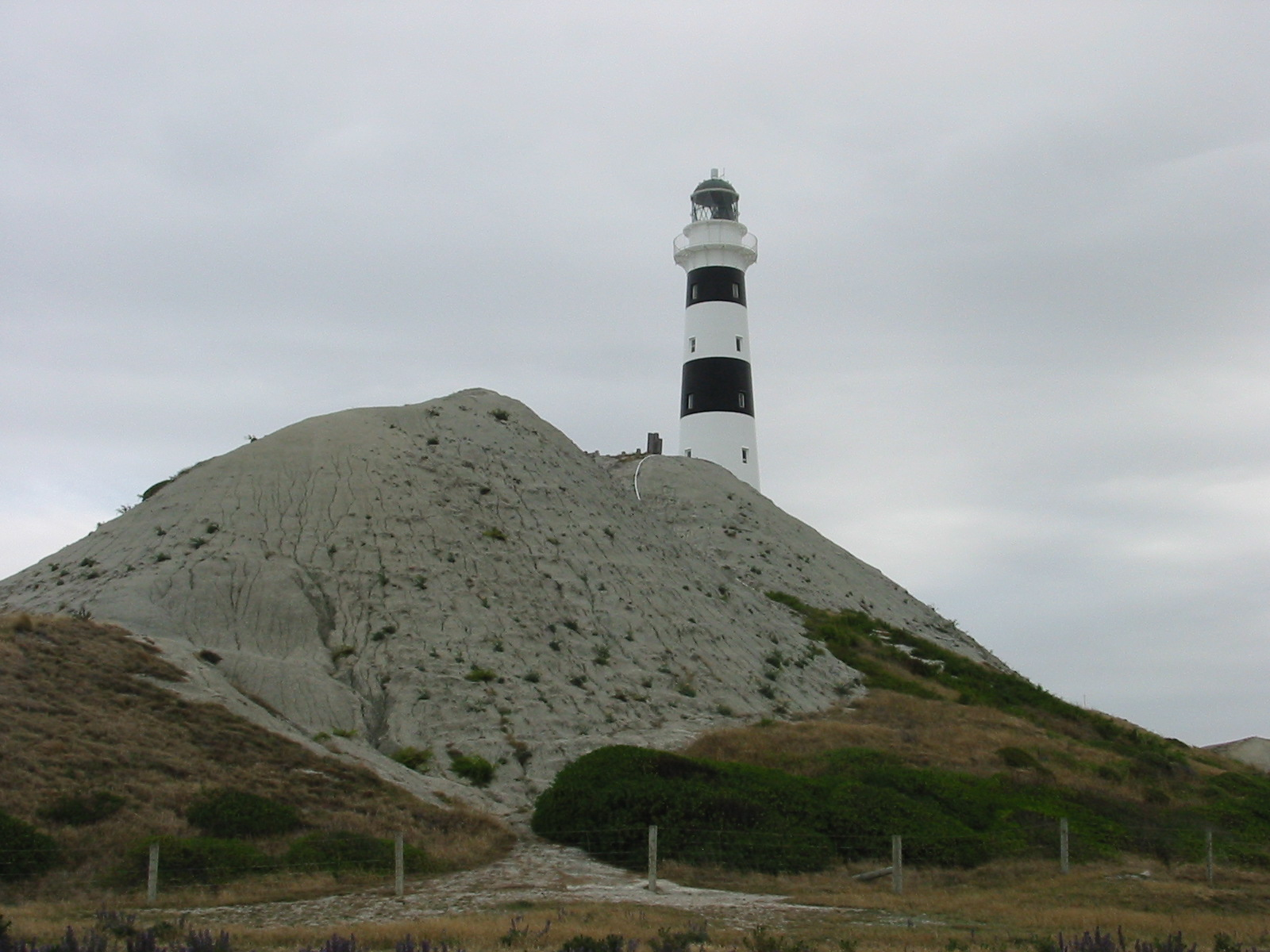
- Location: Cape Campbell; South Island; New Zealand
- Coordinates: 41°43′39.37″S 174°16′31.30″E

Tower
- Constructed: 1870 (first)
- Construction: cast iron tower
- Automated: 1986
- Height: 22 metres (72 ft)
- Shape: cylindrical tower with balcony and lantern
- Markings: white and black horizontal bands tower
- Power source: mains electricity
- Operator: Maritime New Zealand

Light
- First lit: 1905 (current)
- Focal height: 47 metres (154 ft)
- Range: 19 nautical miles (35 km; 22 mi)
- Characteristic: Fl W 15s

Cape Campbell Lighthouse is a lighthouse at Cape Campbell in the Marlborough region of the South Island of New Zealand. It is owned and operated by Maritime New Zealand. The original lighthouse at this site was first lit on 1 August 1870. However, this lighthouse was constructed of timber, and in 1898 these timbers were found to be decaying. This led to the construction of the current cast iron tower, which began operating in October 1905.

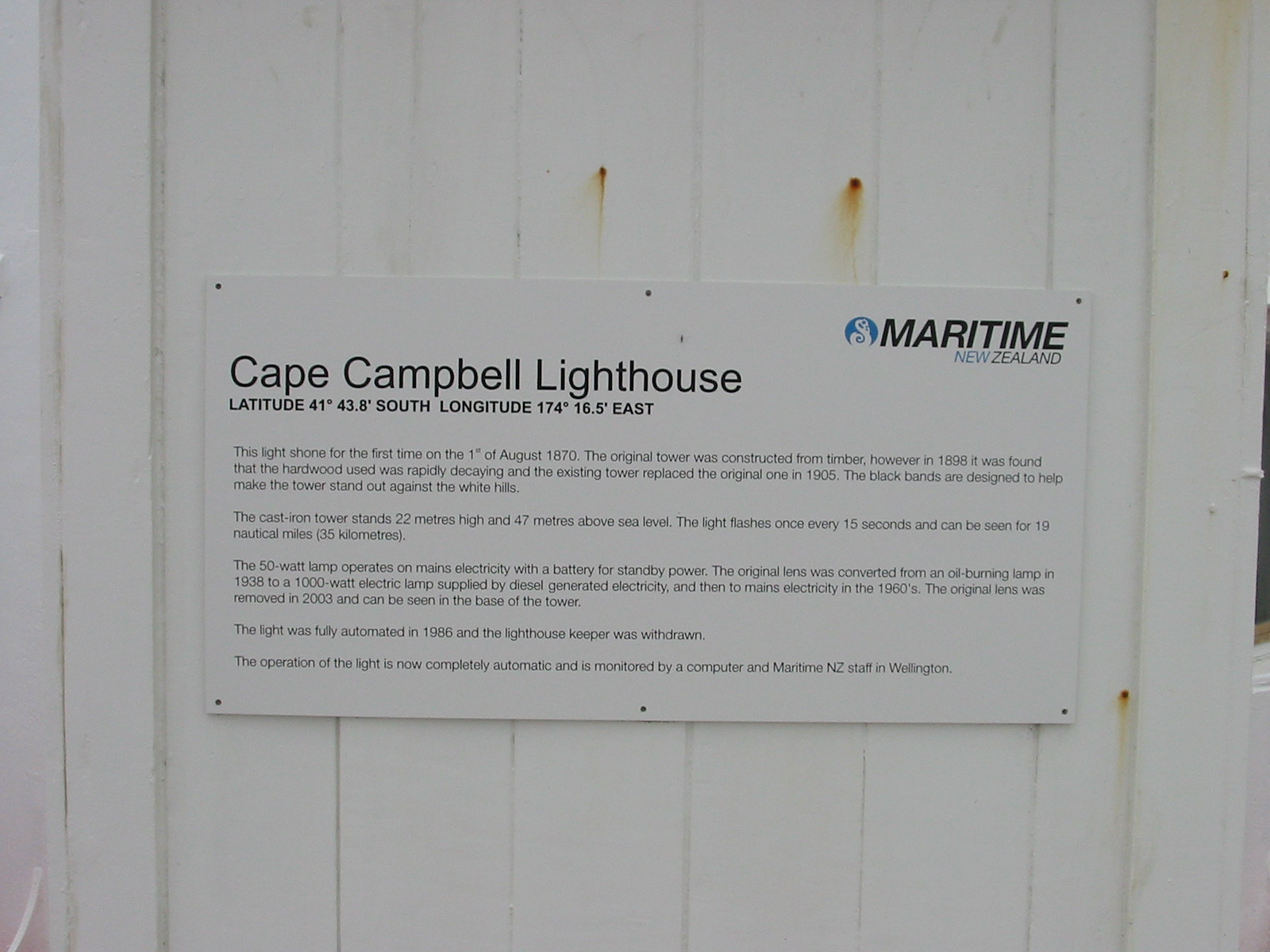
Information plaque on the Cape Campbell Lighthouse

The light was originally fuelled by oil. In 1938 the oil lamp was replaced with an electric one powered by a local diesel generator. This was subsequently replaced by a connection to the mains grid in the 1960s. The light was fully automated in 1986 and is now managed from a control room in Wellington.

It featured in the 2016 film The Light Between Oceans.

== See also ==
- List of lighthouses in New Zealand
