= James Balfour (engineer) =

- Born: 2 June 1831; Colinton, Scotland
- Died: 19 December 1869 (aged 38); Timaru Harbour, New Zealand
- Spouse: Christina Simson
- Relatives: James Balfour (great-grandfather); Robert Whytt (great-grandfather); George William Balfour (brother)
- Engineering career
- Employer: Otago Province
- Projects: Dog Island Lighthouse

James Melville Balfour (2 June 1831 – 19 December 1869) was a Scottish-born New Zealand marine engineer. He is best remembered for the network of lighthouses that he designed. Balfour was a highly energetic man, who despite drowning after only six years in the country, has left a list of projects either designed or constructed by him. He was initially employed by the Otago Provincial Council before his appointment by the Government of New Zealand as the colonial marine engineer.

== Early life and family ==
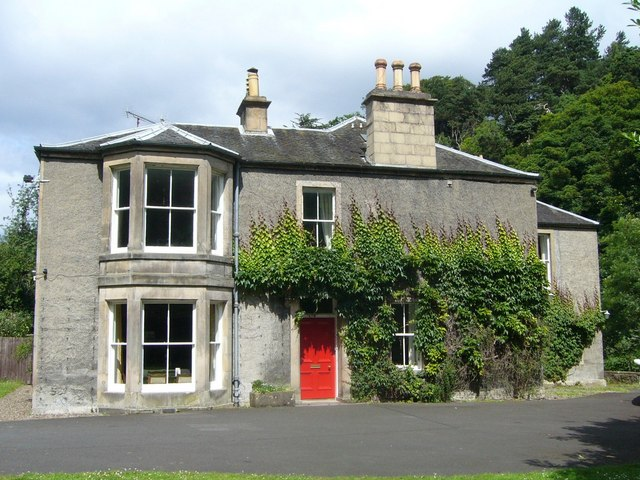
Colinton manse

Balfour was born in the manse of Colinton Parish Church south-west of Edinburgh, Scotland on 2 June 1831. He was the youngest son of Rev. Lewis Balfour (1777–1860), D.D., who for 37 years was minister for the Colinton parish. The philosopher James Balfour was his father's paternal grandfather, and the physician Robert Whytt was his father's maternal grandfather. His father had married Anne Mackintosh on 24 February 1806. Among his siblings were the physician and heart specialist George William Balfour (1823–1903), and Margaret Isabella "Maggie" Balfour (1829–1897) who in 1848 married the lighthouse builder Thomas Stevenson. They were the parents of the author Robert Louis Stevenson.

He received his education at Edinburgh High School and the University of Edinburgh. He studied civil engineering and for his training, he attended workshops in Scotland and, to study optics, in Germany. He did an apprenticeship with famous lighthouse builders, the brothers Thomas and David Stevenson, Thomas being his sister's husband, and he worked in the lighthouse department of the firm.

Balfour married Christina Simson and their only child, Marie Clothilde Balfour, was born in 1862. She married her first cousin James Craig Balfour, the son of Balfour's brother George.

== Career in New Zealand ==
The Balfour family arrived in Port Chalmers on board the Sir Ralph Abercromby on 14 September 1863. Both Balfour and his friend and colleague, Thomas Paterson, had accepted appointments by the Otago Provincial Council for engineering positions. Balfour came as a marine engineer, while Paterson was a bridge, railway and road engineer. Paterson was half a year older than Balfour, and they had attended the same school in Edinburgh. Balfour brought with him from Scotland the lamp equipment he had designed for the proposed lighthouses at Cape Saunders and Taiaroa Head.

Balfour is described as having had "enormous energy", and within half a year, he had commenced a large number of projects. His contract with the provincial council was terminated at the end of 1866 (it is not clear whether this was Balfour's choice), and he then became colonial marine engineer on appointment by the government in Wellington.

== Death ==
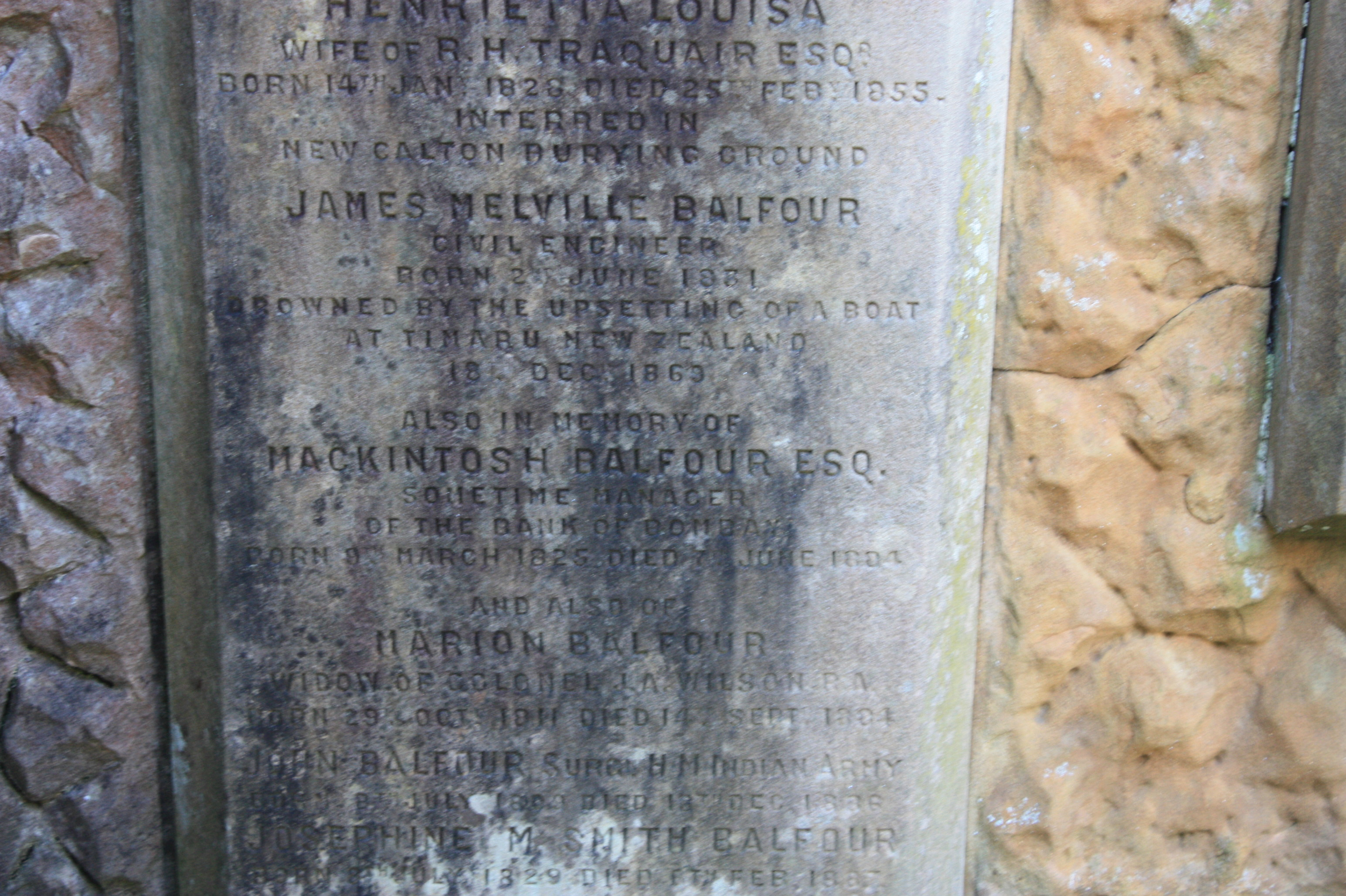
Memorial to James Melville Balfour in the Balfour vault, Colinton churchyard

Balfour's friend Paterson drowned in mid-December 1869 when his coach overturned while crossing the Kakanui River. Upon hearing of his friend's death, Balfour made immediate arrangements to travel to his funeral. On 19 December 1869, eight passengers transferred by whale boat from Timaru Harbour during heavy sea to the SS Maori, which was anchored some distance offshore. The whale boat got into trouble, but the passengers could be transferred into a life boat sent by the SS Maori. A wave washed the lifeboat against the SS Maori, and caused it to overturn. Two of the passengers drowned, including Balfour.

Balfour's name is listed on the wall of the family vault in Colinton.

Balfour was a leading engineer, and it was expected that he would eventually have succeeded John Blackett as Engineer-in-Chief of the Public Works Department.

== List of projects ==
Below is a list of lighthouses either designed by Balfour, or designed and supervised. Some of these are registered by Heritage New Zealand (formerly known as the New Zealand Historic Places Trust).

Photo	Name of lighthouse	Location	Coordinates	Description	Date lit	Heritage registration
	Taiaroa Head Lighthouse	Taiaroa Head, Otago Peninsula	45°46′25.89″S 170°43′44.43″E	One of Balfour's first priorities was the design of this lighthouse to give safe passage to Port Chalmers. Oldest operational lighthouse in the South Island.	2 January 1865	Category 1; number 2220
	Dog Island Lighthouse	Dog Island in Foveaux Strait	46.65190°S 168.4105°E	Another priority project for Balfour to provide safe passage through Foveaux Strait and to Bluff Harbour. Tallest lighthouse in the country, and one of the most distinctive. Operational.	5 August 1865	Category 1; number 395
	Farewell Spit Lighthouse	Farewell Spit	40.546064°S 173.009474°E	Designed by Balfour and under construction when he died, Farewell Spit lighthouse was a navigational help to address frequent groundings at this low-lying but long sandbank. The open-frame timber tower was replaced with an adjacent iron structure in 1897. Operational.	17 June 1870	Not registered
	Nugget Point Lighthouse	Nugget Point on The Catlins coast	46.448133°S 169.816933°E	Designed by Balfour and under construction when he died, Nugget Point lighthouse was needed for safe passage to Port Molyneux situated at the mouth of the Clutha River, then a busy port. Operational.	4 July 1870	Not registered
	Cape Campbell Lighthouse	Cape Campbell, Marlborough Region	41.727604°S 174.275378°E	Designed by Balfour and under construction when he died, Cape Campbell lighthouse was needed as a navigational help. The wooden tower did not hold up well, and the decaying structure was replaced in 1905. Operational.	1 August 1870	Not registered
	Ponui Passage Lighthouse	between Ponui Island and Pakihi Island in the Hauraki Gulf	36.900389°S 175.182761°E	One of two wave-washed lighthouses built in New Zealand. Balfour recommended the location and provided a conceptual design, with James Stewart undertaking the detailed design. Prior to the removal of the lighthouse keeper's cottage in 1938, the structure was very similar in appearance to the Bean Rock Lighthouse. Since demolished and replaced with a beacon.	1871	Demolished
	Bean Rock Lighthouse	on a reef at the entrance of Waitemata Harbour	36.833284°S 174.831127°E	One of two wave-washed lighthouses built in New Zealand. Balfour recommended the location and provided a conceptual design, with James Stewart undertaking the detailed design. Operational.	24 July 1871	Category 1; number 3295
	Cape Saunders Lighthouse	at Matakitaki Point near Cape Saunders on Otago Peninsula	45.881022°S 170.728579°E	Originally planned by Balfour to be built at Cape Saunders, after many delays it was designed by John Blackett for nearby Matakitaki Point. Replaced in 2006 with an aluminium tower.	1 January 1880	Not registered

== Commemoration ==
The name of a small town in Southland originally known as Longridge was changed to Balfour to avoid confusion other New Zealand localities of that name. It is uncertain whether the new name refers to an employee of the Waimea Company who lived locally, or the provincial engineer.

When Eleanor Catton started working on her novel The Luminaries, she used the Papers Past website of the National Library of New Zealand to find suitable names for her characters, set during the time of the West Coast gold rush (1864–1867). Balfour was active on the West Coast during that time, and it is assumed that Catton adopted his surname for the character of the shipping agent Thomas Balfour, who represents Sagittarius in the Man Booker Prize-winning novel.

== Notes and references ==
=== References ===
Books

- Lee, Sidney, ed. (1912). "Balfour, George William" . Dictionary of National Biography (2nd supplement). Vol. 1. London: Smith, Elder & Co.
- Reed, A. W. (2010). Peter Dowling (ed.). Place Names of New Zealand. Rosedale, North Shore: Raupo. ISBN 978-0-14-320410-7.
- Scholefield, Guy, ed. (1940). A Dictionary of New Zealand Biography : A–L (PDF). Vol. I. Wellington: Department of Internal Affairs. Archived (PDF) from the original on 9 March 2012.

Newspapers

- "Port Chalmers". Otago Daily Times. No. 542. 14 September 1863.
- "Sad Accident at Timaru". The Press. Vol. XV, no. 2084. 20 December 1869.
- "Fatal Accidents in the South". Daily Southern Cross. Vol. XXV, no. 3851. 24 December 1869.
- "The Late Mr Balfour". The Star. No. 503. 29 December 1869.
- Mussen, Deidre (26 March 2013). "Catton's novel brings old family links to life". The Press.

Websites

- Aspden, R J. "Balfour, James Melville". Institution of Professional Engineers New Zealand. Archived from the original on 1 December 2017.
- Beaglehole, Helen (9 July 2013). "Lighthouses – A national system". Te Ara: The Encyclopedia of New Zealand.
- James, Dr. Maureen. "Marie Clothilde Balfour – Biography". Telling History.
- "James Melville Balfour". Grace's Guide.
- "Thomas Paterson (1830–1869)". Grace's Guide.
- Phillips, Mark. "New Zealand Lighthouses". newzealandlighthouses.com.

- "Bean Rock Lighthouse (1871)". 30 December 2009.
- "Cape Campbell (1870) (1905)". 28 November 2009.
- "Cape Saunders (1880)". Archived from the original on 15 January 2015.
- "Dog Island (1865)". 29 December 2009. Archived from the original on 16 December 2014.
- "Farewell Spit (1869)". 18 June 2011. Archived from the original on 16 October 2018.
- "Nugget Point (1870)".
- "Ponui Passage (1871)". 12 December 2009.
- "Taiaroa Head (1865)". 5 February 2011.

- Whitehouse, Olwyn. "Shipping News 1863". rootsweb. New Zealand Bound.
