= Roger French =

Roger French may refer to:

- Roger Kenneth French (1938–2002), English medical historian
- Roger H. French, American materials scientist and engineer
