= Neil McVicar =

Neil McVicar may refer to:

- Neil McVicar (politician)
- Neil McVicar (minister)
