= James Balfour (philosopher) =

Scottish lawyer and philosopher

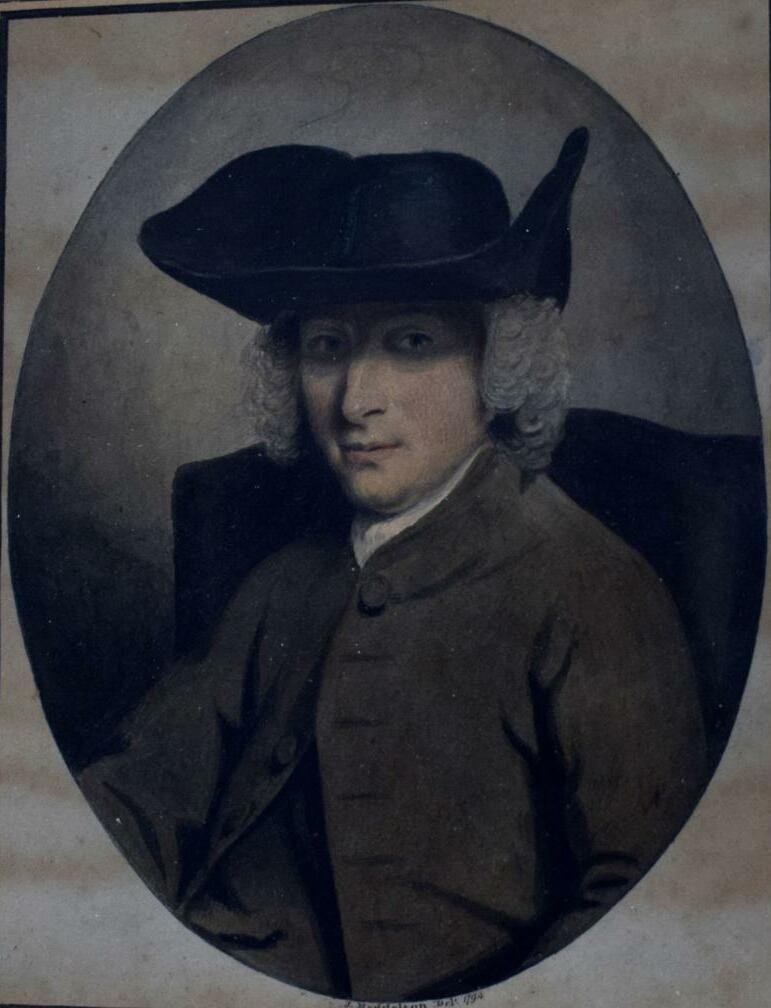
- portrait by J. Middleton
- Born: 20 August 1705
- Died: 6 March 1795 (aged 89)
- Spouse(s): Cecilia Helen Elphinstone
- Children: 4
- Relatives: John Balfour, Louisa Balfour, Helen Balfour, Bridget Balfour

James Balfour of Pilrig JP (20 August 1705 – 6 March 1795) was a Scottish advocate and philosopher.

== Life ==
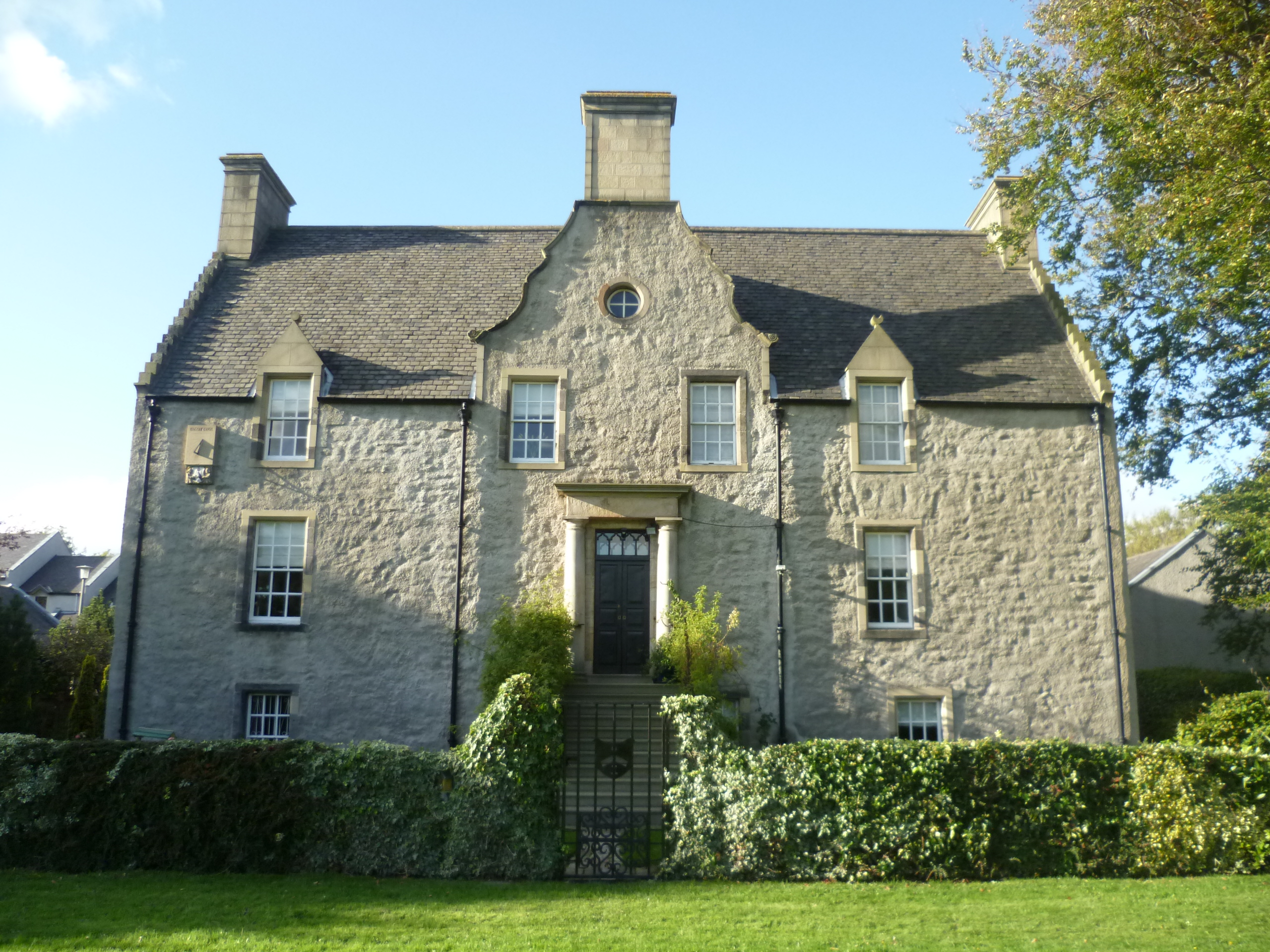
Pilrig House

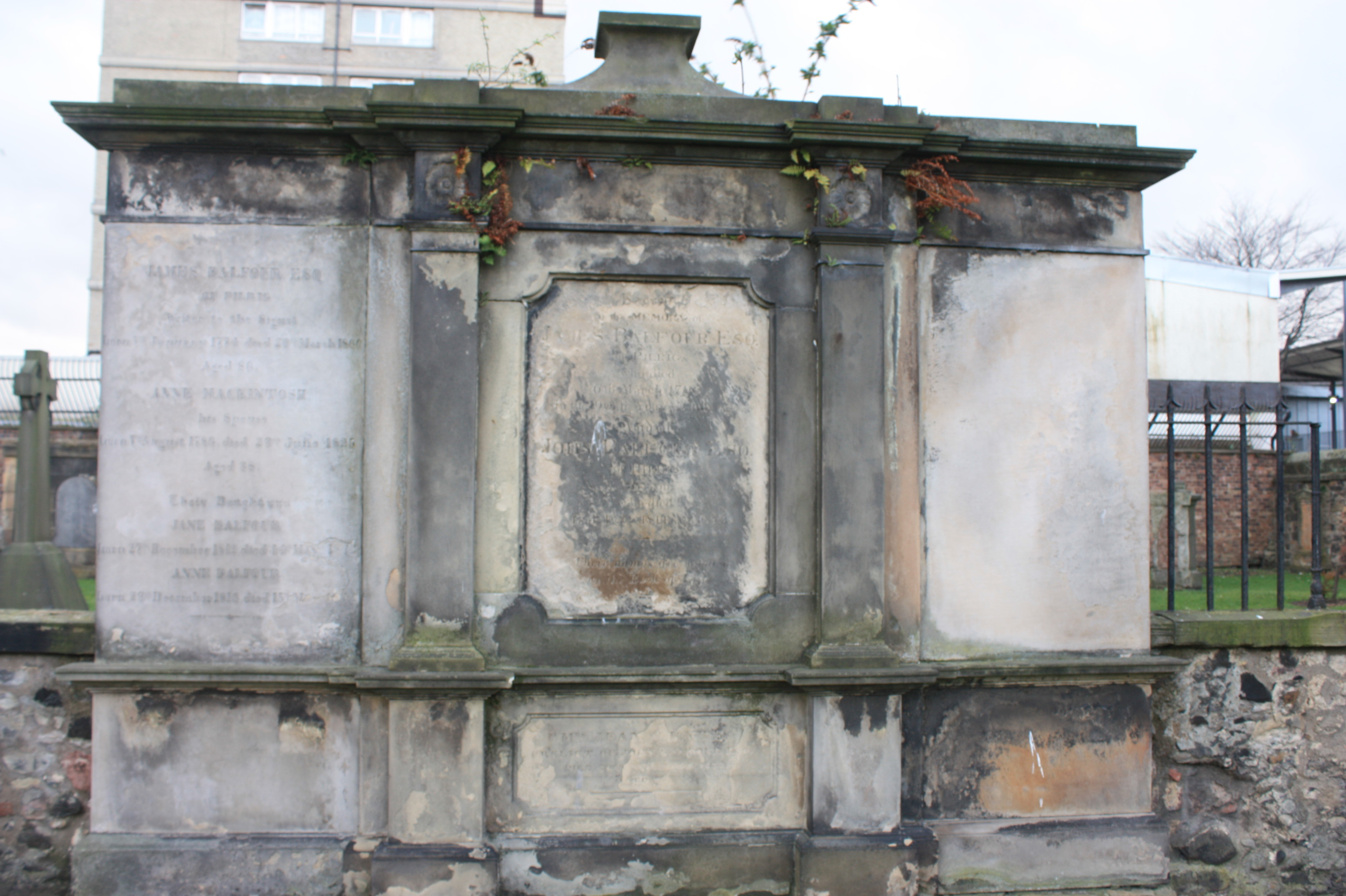
The grave of James Balfour, South Leith Churchyard, Edinburgh

He was born on 20 August 1705 at Pilrig House, midway between Leith and Edinburgh. He was one of the 16 children of Louisa Hamilton and her husband, the Edinburgh merchant James Balfour (1681–1737). His father had acquired the estate of Pilrig from the Gilbert family, which had lost a fortune investing in the Darien Expedition, and built the current Pilrig House around 1705.

After studying law at the University of Edinburgh and the University of Leyden, he was called to the Scottish bar as an advocate.

He held the offices of treasurer to the Faculty of Advocates and sheriff-substitute of the county of Edinburgh. In 1754 he was appointed to the chair of Professor of Moral Philosophy in the University of Edinburgh, and in 1764 transferred to that of Professor of Public Law.

In 1775 he is still listed as living in Pilrig House, having inherited the property on the death of his father.

He was Secretary to the Edinburgh Company of Golfers, and belonged to both the Edinburgh and Leith Golf Courses. In this role he would have been involved in the establishment of the original rules of golf in 1777.

He died on 6 March 1795. He is buried in the graveyard of South Leith Parish Church.

== Works ==
He was the author of three philosophical books:

- A Delineation of the Nature and Obligation of Morality, with Reflexions upon Mr. Hume's book entitled An Inquiry concerning the Principles of Morals. This book was published anonymously, the first edition in 1753, the second in 1763.
- Philosophical Essays, published anonymously in 1768.
- Philosophical Dissertations, published in 1782 under the author's name.

James McCosh, in his work on the Scottish Philosophy, says of him:

He sets out (in his "Delineation") with the principle that private happiness must be the chief end and object of every man's pursuit; shows how the good of others affords the greatest happiness; and then, to sanction natural conscience, he calls in the authority of God, who must approve of what promotes the greatest happiness. This theory does not give morality 'a sufficiently deep foundation in the constitution of man on the character of God, and could not have stood against the assaults of Hume. ... In his "Philosophical Essays" he wrote against Hume and Lord Kaimes, and in defence of active power and liberty. Like all active opponents of the new scepticism he felt it necessary to oppose the favourite theory of Locke, that all our ideas are derived from sensation and reflexion.

== Family ==
In 1737 he married Cecilia Helen Elphinstone (1705–1780), daughter of Sir John Elphinstone. They had one daughter, Mary Cecelia, and three sons, James, John, and Lewis. Mary married William Gibson and was mother to James Gibson-Craig who was created a baronet in 1831.

His brother Robert Balfour (born 1706) was a local entrepreneur, running a soapworks in Leith and operating a stagecoach from Edinburgh to Leith.

Balfour's mother was a Miss Hamilton, of Airdrie, great-grandaunt of the late Sir William Hamilton, 9th Baronet, professor of logic and metaphysics in the University of Edinburgh 1836–1856. His eldest sister married Gavin Hamilton, bookseller and publisher in Edinburgh (also, it is believed, a member of the Airdrie family), whose eldest son was Robert Hamilton, professor of mathematics in Marischal College and University, Aberdeen, author of a treatise on the national debt. The brothers George William Balfour and James Balfour were great-grandsons, the former a heart specialist in Scotland, and the latter a marine engineer in New Zealand.

He was the grandfather to Rev Lewis Balfour and the great-great-grandfather of Robert Louis Stevenson. It is noteworthy that Stevenson's christened name was Robert Lewis Balfour Stevenson, in deference to his ancestral family.

His grandson Elphinstone Balfour was a bookseller on the Royal Mile.

His granddaughter Margaret Balfour married Rev John Paul, minister of St Cuthbert's Church, Edinburgh and Moderator of the General Assembly in 1847.

In 1737 his sister Bridget Balfour (d. 1764) married Rev Neil McVicar, minister of St Cuthbert's Church, Edinburgh.

In 1750 his niece Helen Balfour, married rev Thomas Scott, minister of South Leith Parish Church.
