= Marie Clothilde Balfour =

British writer (1862–1931)

- Born: 20 October 1862; Edinburgh
- Died: September 1931 (aged 68); London
- Occupations: Writer, folklorist
- Father: James Balfour
- Relatives: Robert Louis Stevenson (cousin); George William Balfour (uncle and father-in-law); Thomas Stevenson (uncle)

Marie Clothilde Balfour (20 October 1862 – September 1931) was a British writer, translator, and folklorist. She wrote three novels, stories, and plays; translated poetry and a French Revolution-era memoir; collected folk stories and songs; and edited two volumes of letters from her aunt.

== Early life and education ==
Balfour was born in Edinburgh, the daughter of James Balfour, a noted engineer, and Christina Simson Balfour (later Nicholson). Writer Robert Louis Stevenson was her first cousin. She spent her early years in New Zealand while her father was working there; when he died in 1869, she returned to Scotland with her mother.

== Publications ==
Balfour wrote three novels, translated a French Revolution-era memoir, and edited two volumes of letters from her aunt, Margaret Isabella Balfour Stevenson, sent during her travels with her son in Polynesia. She also wrote plays and stories, and collected folklore from Northumberland and Lincolnshire. "From time to time doubts have been expressed about the authenticity of the tales that Marie Clothilde Balfour said she had collected," notes one scholar, because the tales she published were especially strange, and she certainly added her own literary flourishes.

- "Legends of the Lincolnshire Cars" (Folk-Lore, Vol. II, 1891, a series of articles)
- White Sand (1896, novel)
- Maris Stella (1896, novel)
- "Sub Tegmine Fagi" (The Yellow Book, Volume X, July 1896, short story)
- The Fall of the Sparrow (1897, novel)
- "Saint Joseph and Mary, from a French folk song" (The Yellow Book, Volume XII, January 1897, poem translated by Balfour)
- From Saranac to the Marquesas and beyond; being letters written by Mrs. M. I. Stevenson during 1887–88, to her sister, Jane Whyte Balfour (1903, edited by Balfour)
- Examples of printed folk-lore concerning Northumberland (1904, collected folksongs)
- Memoirs of Mlle des Écherolles, being sidelights on the Reign of Terror (1904, translated by Balfour)
- Mrs. M. I. Stevenson, Letters from Samoa, 1891–1895 (1906, edited by Balfour)

== Personal life ==
Balfour married her first cousin, physician James Craig Balfour; they had a daughter, Marie Margaret Melville Balfour, who also became a writer. Balfour's husband died in 1907, and she died in London in 1931.
