= William Johnston (minister) =

Scottish priest (1921–2005)

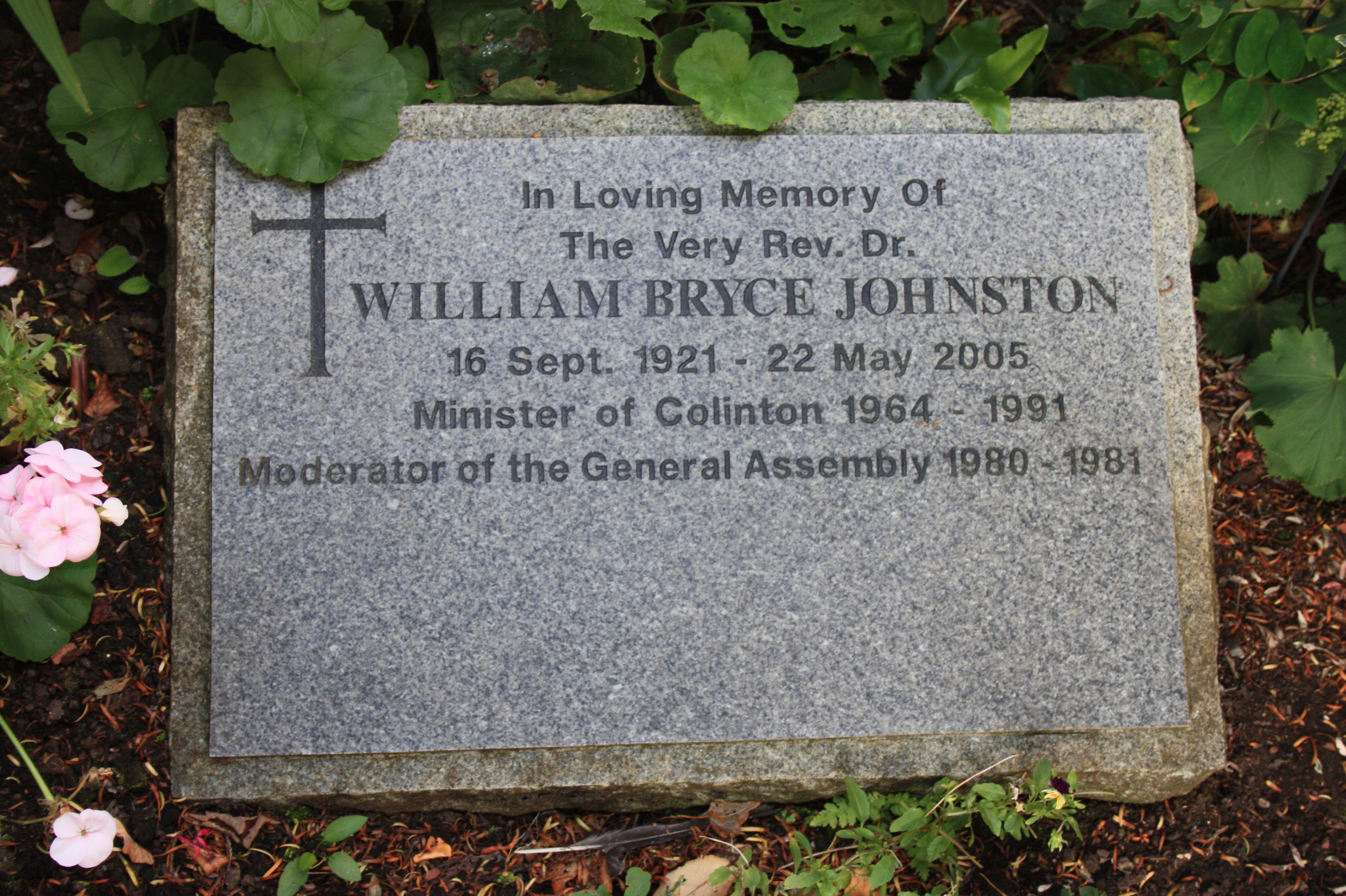
The grave of William Bryce Johnston, Colinton Churchyard

William Bryce Johnston, (16 September 1921 – 22 May 2005) was a Church of Scotland minister, most notably Moderator of the General Assembly of the Church of Scotland from 1980 until 1981.

He was Executive Committee Chairman of the British Council of Churches.

== Life ==
He was born on 16 September 1921, in Edinburgh, to William B. Johnston, a civil servant, and his wife, Isabel W. Highley.

He was educated at George Watson’s College. He then studied Classics and Divinity at the University of Edinburgh and New College Edinburgh.

He was ordained as a Chaplain to HM Forces in 1945. Initially acting as Chaplain to the Kings Own Scottish Borderers he later transferred to the highly unusual role as Chaplain to the captured German prisoners of war in Scotland, having special efforts to relieve the plight of the German chaplains captured (who were treated as normal soldiers).

He was the Minister at Bo’ness from 1949 to 1954; Greenock from 1955 to 1964; and Colinton Parish Church from 1964 to 1991. At Greenock he was involved with work at Greenock women's prison. A frequent religious broadcaster he was a regular contributor to "Good Morning Scotland".

In 1975, he represented Scotland at the Assembly of the World Council of Churches in Nairobi.

His year as Moderator included a trip to Jerusalem to mark the 50th anniversary of the building of the Scottish church there.

He was an Honorary Chaplain to the Queen from 1991.

He died on 22 May 2005 and was interred in the south side grounds of Colinton Church.

== Family ==
In 1947 he married Ruth Cowley, daughter of Rev Cowley, whom he met in post-war Germany. They had one son and two daughters.
