= Lewis Balfour =

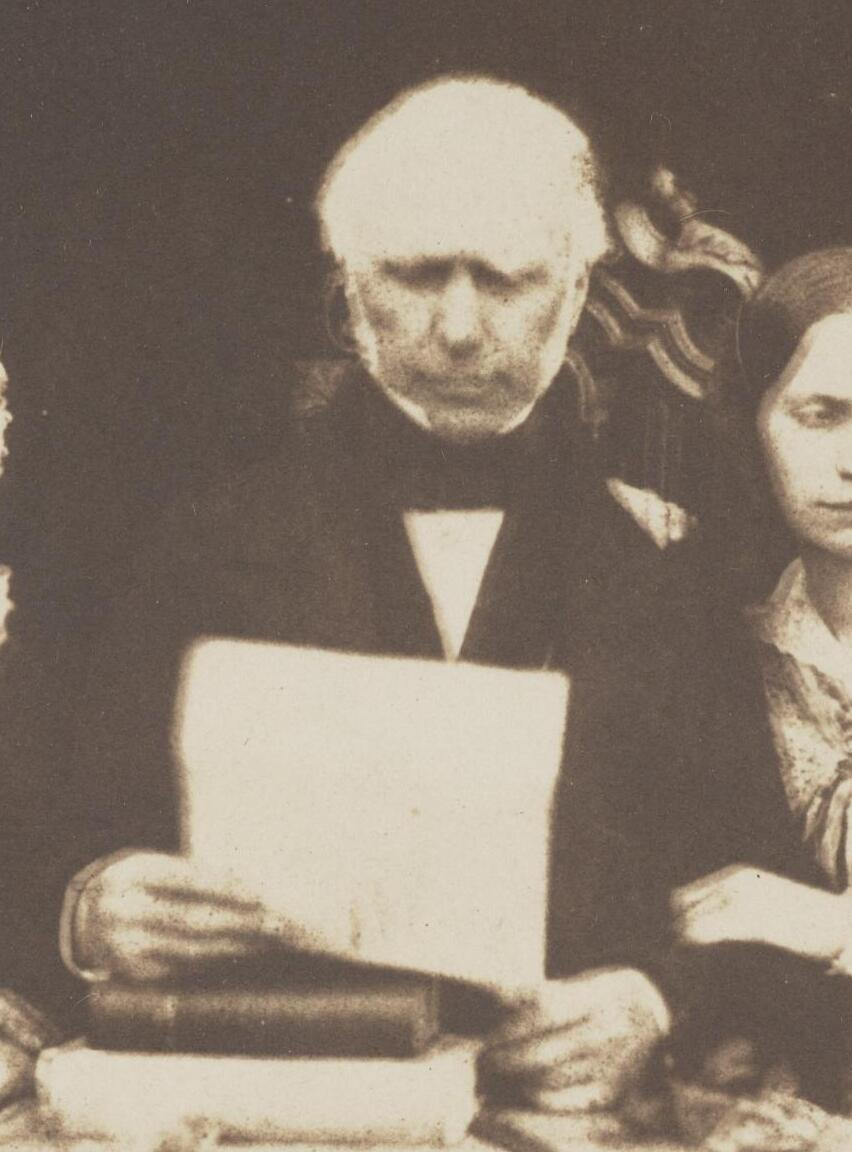
- Born: 30 August 1777
- Died: 24 April 1860 (aged 82)
- Spouse(s): Henrietta Scott Smith
- Children: James Balfour, Matilde Margaret Isabella Stevenson, Mackintosh Balfour, Marion Balfour, George William Balfour
- Parent(s): John Balfour, 3rd of Pilrig; Jean Whytt
- Relatives: James Balfour, 4th of Pilrig

Lewis Balfour (1777–1860) was a Scottish Church of Scotland minister and grandfather to the author Robert Louis Stevenson.

== Life ==
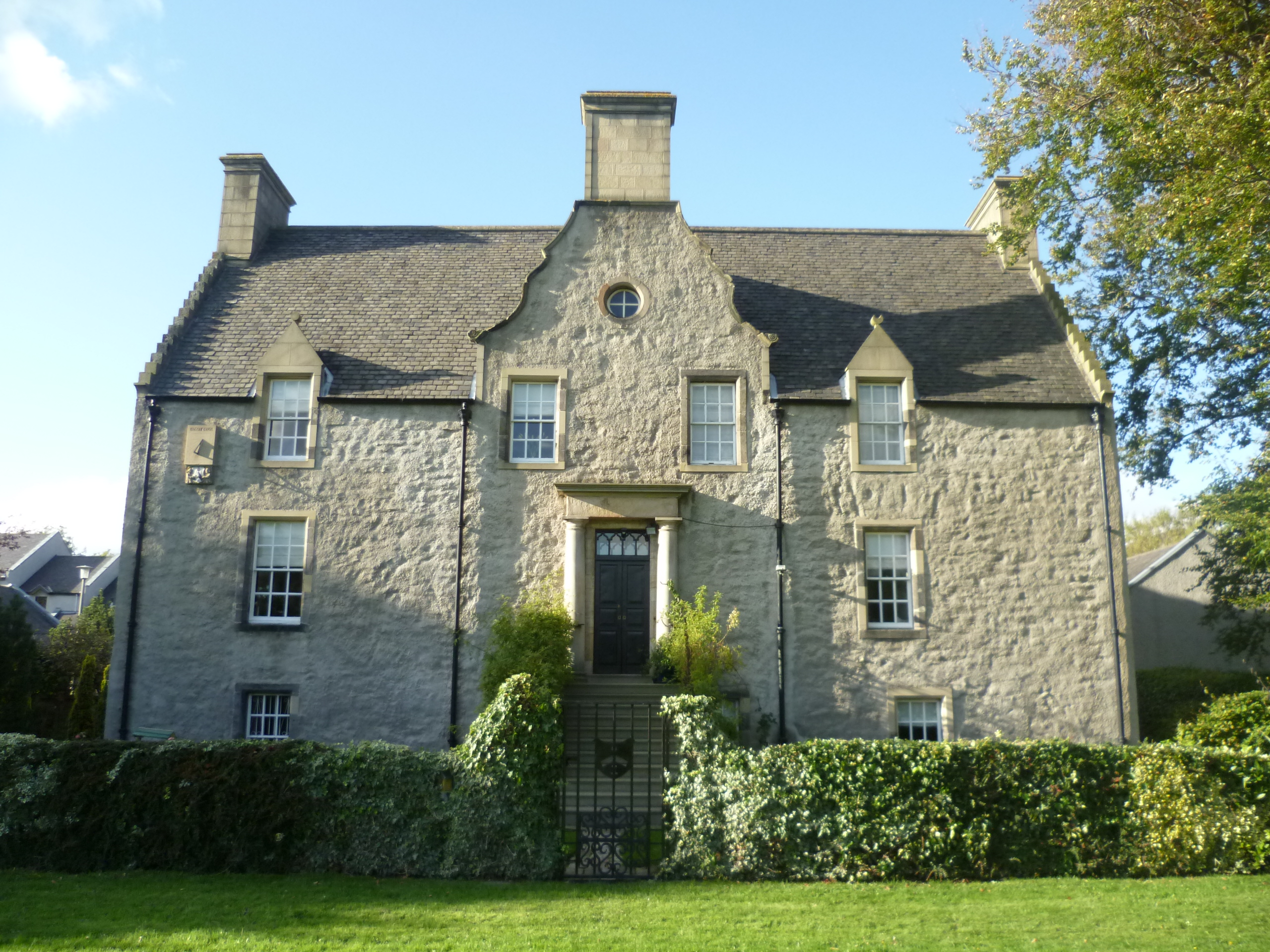
Pilrig House

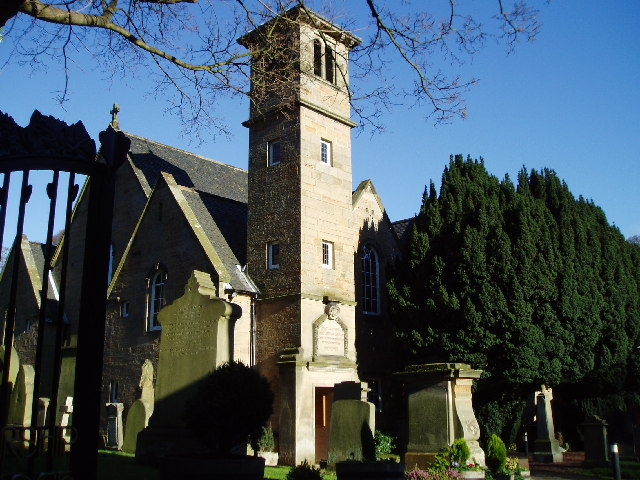
Colinton Church

Balfour was born on 30 August 1777 at Pilrig House between Edinburgh and Leith, the son of Jean Whytt (1750–1833) and John Balfour of Pilrig (1740–1814). His mother was from Bennochy Lodge near Kirkcaldy, Fife, the daughter of Dr Robert Whytt, Professor of Medicine at the University of Edinburgh and his father was the son of James Balfour. He was christened on 14 May 1777 in South Leith Parish Church.

Lewis was educated at the High School in Edinburgh then studied divinity at the University of Edinburgh. He was licensed to preach by the Church of Scotland in 1805 and in August 1806 he was ordained as minister of Sorn.

In 1823 James, Earl of Lauderdale, acted as his patron and in 1824 he was translated to Colinton parish south-west of Edinburgh and remained there for the rest of his life. From 1850 onwards his young grandson Robert Louis Stevenson was a frequent visitor.

His position as minister of Colinton was filled by Rev Dr William Lockhart of Denny.

== Family ==
On 26 April 1808, he married Henrietta Scott Smith (born 1787), the third daughter of the Rev. Dr George Smith (1748–1823), minister of Galston. They were married at the manse in Galston.

Their thirteen children included the engineer James Balfour, the physician George William Balfour and Margaret Isabella Balfour. Margaret married the lighthouse engineer Thomas Stevenson and was the mother of the author Robert Louis Stevenson. Their daughter Henrietta Louisa Balfour (1822–1853), married R. H. Traquair, uncle of naturalist and palaeontologist Ramsay Traquair. Their sons Lewis Balfour (1817–1870) was a merchant in Calcutta, and Mackintosh Balfour (1825–1894) was a manager in the Bank of Bombay.

R. L. Stevenson's book A Child's Garden of Verses remembers his summers at Colinton manse.

The 1851 census records two grandchildren living at Colinton Manse, Lewis Balfour (born 1842, India, died 1873), and John Boyle (born 1841, India).

He died at Colinton manse on 24 April 1860. He was predeceased by his wife Henrietta who also died at the manse on 13 March 1844. Balfour is buried in an open vault on the north side of Colinton Parish Church, between James Gillespie and Admiral John Inglis.

== Family tree ==
Lewis Balfour family tree

James Balfour (philosopher)	Robert Whytt
John Balfour of Pilrig	Jean Whytt
Rev Lewis Balfour	Henrietta Scott Smith
James Melville Balfour	George William Balfour	Margaret Isabella Balfour	Thomas Stevenson (engineer)
Robert Louis Stevenson

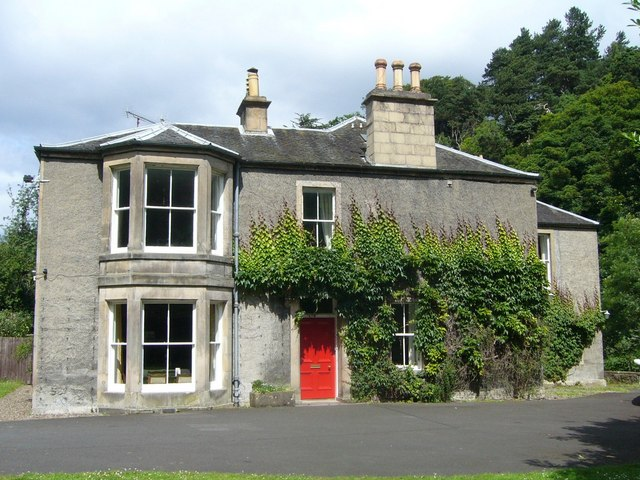
Colinton manse

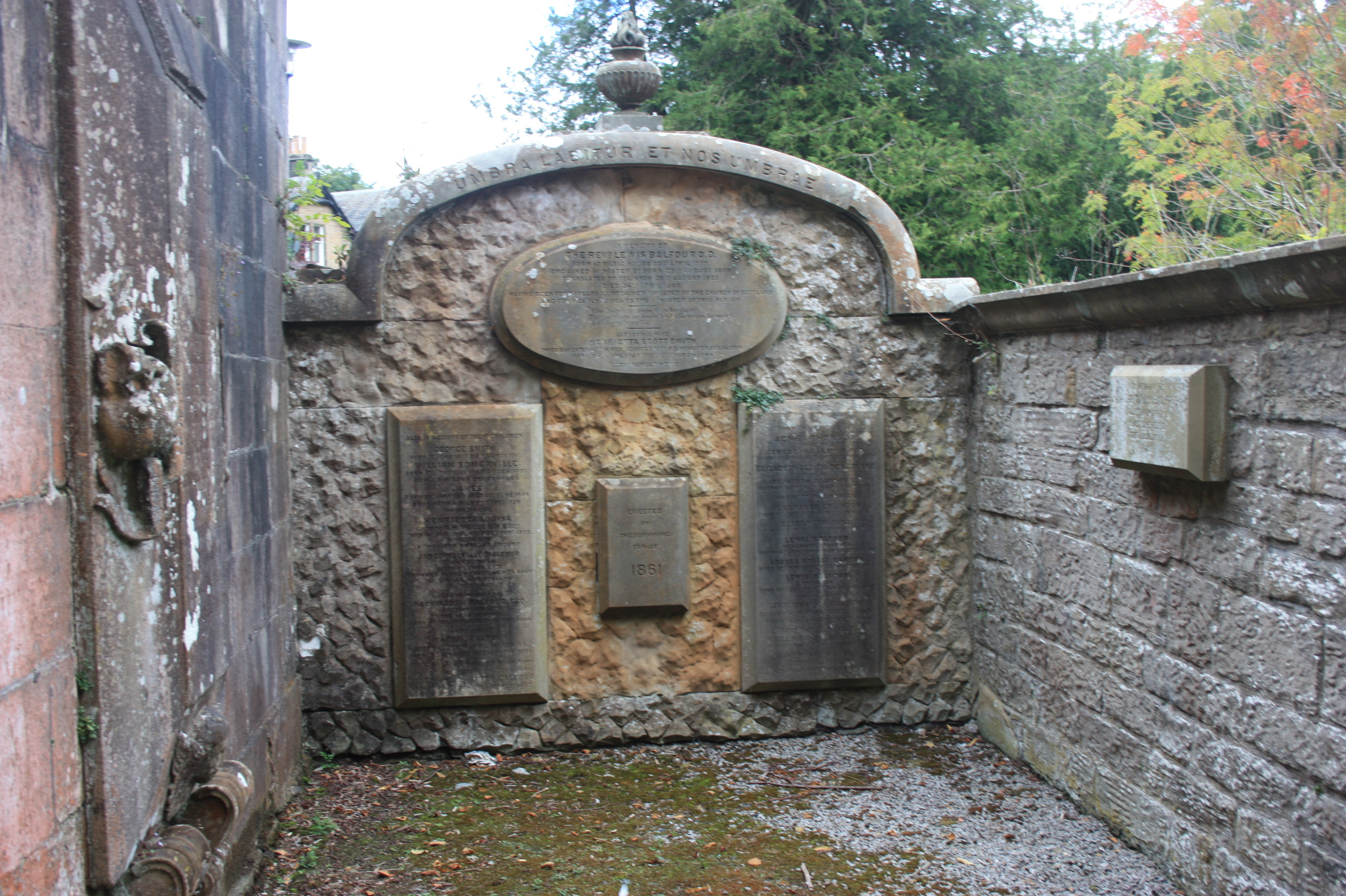
The grave of Rev Lewis Balfour, Colinton churchyard

== Artistic recognition ==
A family photographic portrait is held in the Scottish National Portrait Gallery.

== Publications ==
- Sermon on the Death of Rev David Wilkie (1838)
