= Carl Ludwig Sigmund =

Austrian physician

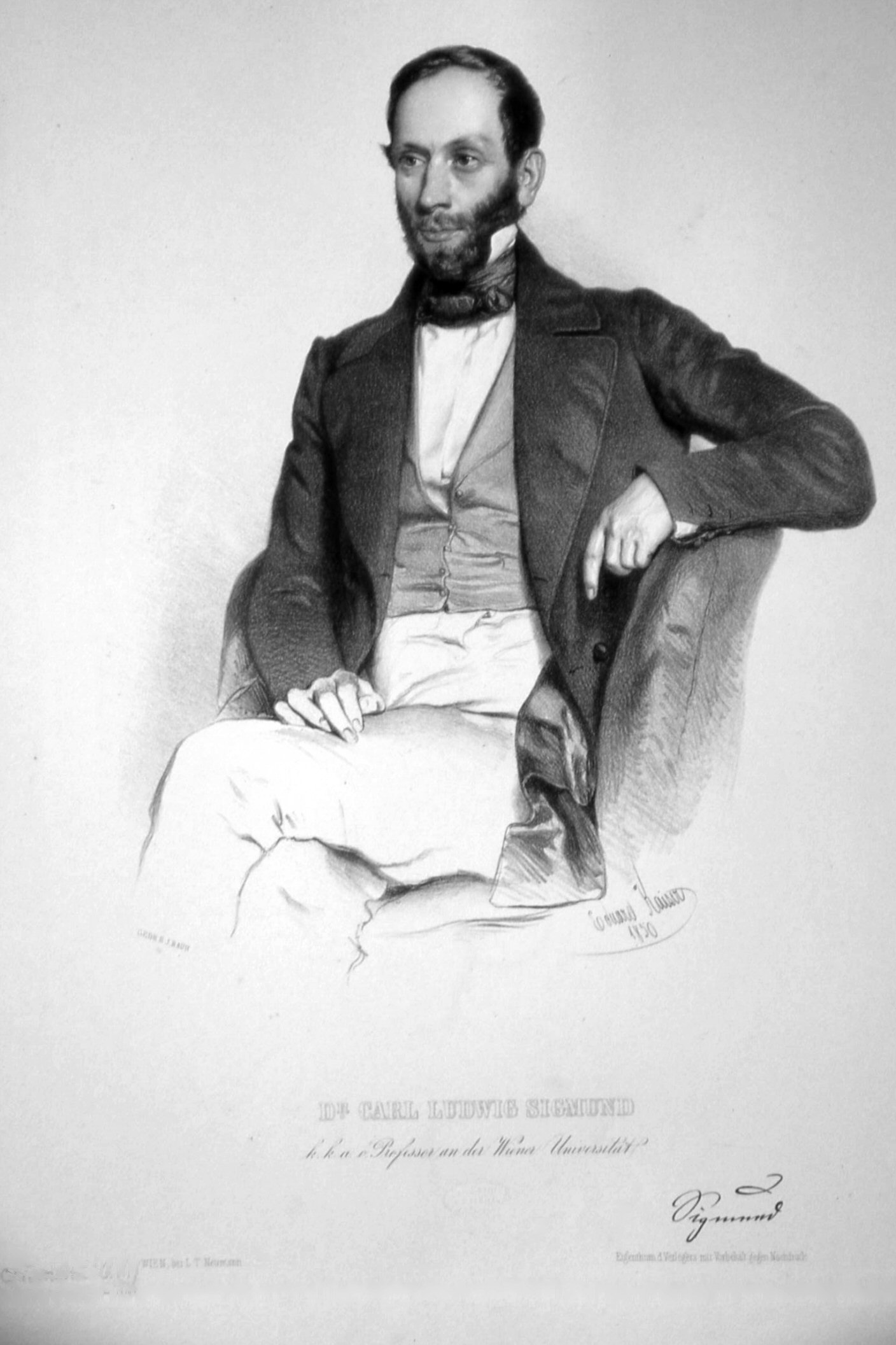
Carl Ludwig Sigmund von Ilanor. Lithograph by Eduard Kaiser, 1850

Carl Ludwig Sigmund von Ilanor (27 August 1810 – 1 February 1883) was an Austrian syphilologist born in Schässburg (Sighişoara), Transylvania.

He studied medicine and surgery at Josephs-Akademie in Vienna, earning his doctorate in 1837 at the University of Pest. In 1842 he became the senior surgical doctor at the Allgemeines Krankenhaus in Vienna, and during the following year received his habilitation. In 1849 he became a full professor at the University of Vienna and director of the syphilology clinic. He died on 1 February 1883 on a journey to Padua.

In addition to his written works on syphilis and its treatment, he published a number of works in the field of balneology. His name is associated with "Sigmund's glands", also known as epitrochlear lymph nodes.

== Selected works ==
- Füred's Mineralquellen und der Plattensee, 1837 – Balatonfüred's mineral springs.
- Gleichenberg, seine Mineralquellen und der Kurort: Aerztliche Mittheilungen, 1840 – Gleichenberg, its mineral springs and the spa.
- Die Einreibungscur mit grauer Quecksilbersalbe bei Syphilisformen, 1866 – Treatment with gray mercurial ointment for syphilitic formations.
- Syphilis und venerische Geschwürsformen, 1870 – Syphilis and venereal ulcer formations.
- Die Wiener Klinik für Syphilis. Ein Rückblick auf ihr 25 jähriges Bestehen, 1878 – The Vienna clinic for syphilis. A look back at their 25th anniversary.
- Vorlesungen über neuere Behandlungsweisen der Syphilis, 1880 – Lectures on newer methods of treatment for syphilis.
