= Roger H. French =

Roger Harquail French
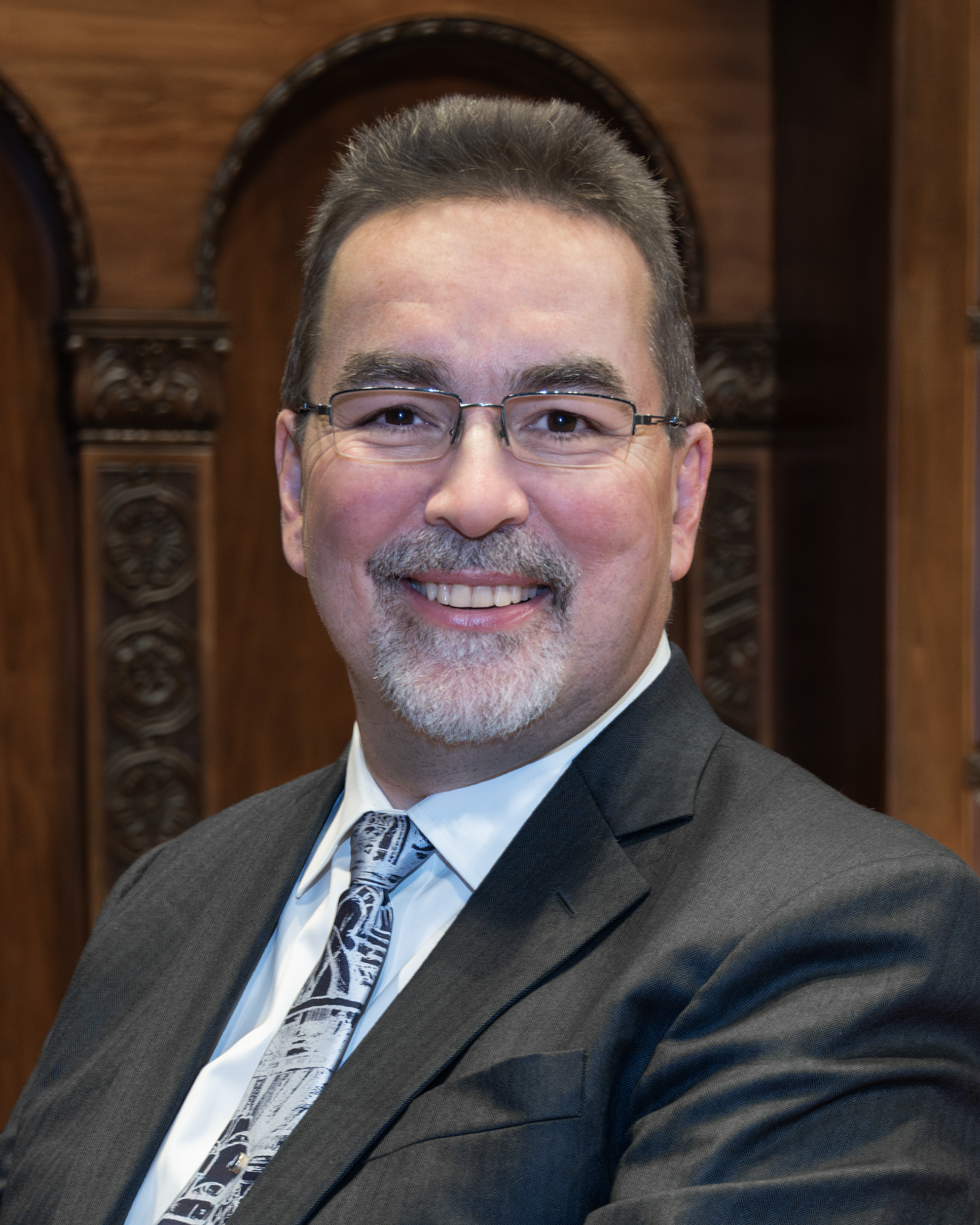
- Occupations: Materials scientist, engineer, academic and author

Academic background
- Education: BS., Materials Science and Engineering; PhD., Materials Science and Engineering
- Alma mater: Cornell University; Massachusetts Institute of Technology

Academic work
- Institutions: Case Western Reserve University

Roger Harquail French is a materials scientist, engineer, academic and author. He is the Kyocera Professor in the Case School of Engineering at Case Western Reserve University (CWRU).

French's research interests at CWRU span optical properties and electronic structure, degradation science of materials in outdoor-exposed technologies such as photovoltaics, and employing data science and deep learning using distributed and high-performance computing. While at DuPont he worked on semiconductor lithography, phase shift masks, pellicles, and photoresists, registering multiple patents. His publications comprise research articles and a book entitled Durability and Reliability of Polymers and Other Materials in Photovoltaic Modules. He received the 2020 Faculty Distinguished Research Award and the 2023 Innovation Week Inventor Award from Case Western Reserve University, in addition to being honored as a Senior Member of the IEEE and as a Fellow of the American Ceramic Society.

== Education ==
French graduated with a Bachelor of Science with Distinction in Materials Science and Engineering from Cornell University in 1979, and in 1985 obtained a PhD in Materials Science and Engineering from the Massachusetts Institute of Technology, working with doctoral advisor Robert L. Coble.

== Career ==
French began his research career in 1985 in Central Research and Development at DuPont. From 1993 to 2002, while still working at DuPont, he was a Visiting Scientist for a month a year in Manfred Rühle's lab at Max-Planck-Institut für Metallforschung in Stuttgart, Germany. His academic career began as an adjunct professor in the Materials Science Department at the University of Pennsylvania in 1996. In 2010, he joined Case Western Reserve University as the F. Alex Nason Professor and has been the Kyocera Professor of Ceramics at CWRU since 2016. He is also the director of the DOE-NNSA Center of Excellence for Materials Data Science for Stockpile Stewardship, and a Co-Principal Investigator of both the NSF Materials Data Science for Reliability and Degradation Center (MDS-Rely) and the NSF-sponsored IUCRC Center for Advancing Sustainable and Distributed Fertilizer Production (CASFER).

== Research ==
French has studied optical properties and electronic structures of ceramics, polymers, and biomolecules, employing spectroscopy and computational optics, and has explored radiation durability, photochemical degradation, and data-driven approaches to predict lifetime performance and enhance energy efficiency in outdoor-exposed technologies. His group has utilized VUV and optical spectroscopies, along with spectroscopic ellipsometry, to investigate the optical properties, electronic structure, and radiation durability of optical materials, polymers, ceramics, and liquids. He has earned patents for phase shift photomasks, transparent fluoropolymers for pellicles, photoresists and immersion fluids, and optical elements for photovoltaics. His research has contributed to the understanding of how these optical properties influence van der Waals quantum electrodynamical interactions, crucial in governing wetting phenomena and mesoscale assembly in nanotubes and biomolecular materials like DNA and proteins.

French has developed non-relational, distributed computing environments based on Hadoop, Hbase, Ozone, Impala, and Spark for data science and analytics of complex systems. Through this framework, he has integrated real-world performance data with lab-based experimental datasets to elucidate degradation mechanisms and pathways active over the lifespan of technologies. His methods encompass network modeling, structural equations, and graphs to quantify and simulate global spatio-temporal systems such as PV power plants.

In the area of Lifetime and Degradation Science (L&DS), French's focus has extended to examining long-lived environmentally-exposed materials, components, and systems, including PV technologies, roofing, and building exteriors. For projects under DOE-SETO, he has researched the lifetime performance and reliability of mono- and bi-facial silicon PERC modules and modeling PV fleet performance using spatio-temporal Graph Neural Networks (stGNNs). Under his leadership, the SDLE Research Center has applied data science methodologies across a broad spectrum of energy and materials projects, including a DOE ARPA-E funded initiative on building energy efficiency.

== Personal life ==
He is the son of James Bruce French.

== Awards and honors ==
- 1989 – R&D Award for LPLS-521 VUV-LPLS Spectrophotometer, Research & Development World
- 1998 – Fulrath Award, American Ceramics Society
- 2020 – Faculty Distinguished Research Award, Case Western Reserve University
- 2023 – Innovation Week Inventor Award, Case Western Reserve University
- 2025 – Distinguished University Professor, Case Western Reserve University

== Publications ==
=== Software packages ===
- Bryant, C., Wheeler, R. N., Rubel, F., & French, H. R. (2017, December 20). "kgc: Koeppen-Geiger Climatic Zones." SDLE Res. Cntr., Case Western Reserve University.
- Karimi, M. A., Pierce, G. B., Fada, S, J., Parrilla, A. N., French, H. R., Braid, L. J. (2020, May 8). "PVimage: Package for PV Image Analysis and Machine Learning Modeling." SDLE Res. Cntr., Case Western Reserve University.
- Huang, W. H., et al. (2021, April 14). "ddiv: Data Driven I-V Feature Extraction." SDLE Res. Cntr., Case Western Reserve University.
- Wang, M., et al. (2021, April 30). "SunsVoc: Constructing Suns-Voc from Outdoor Time-series I-V Curves." SDLE Res. Cntr., Case Western Reserve University. h
- Huang, W. H., et al. (2023, September 6). "netSEM: Network Structural Equation Modeling." SDLE Res. Cntr., Case Western Reserve University.
- Fan, Y., Yu, Xuanji., Weiser, R., Wu, Y., French, H. R. (2023). "PVplr-stGNN: Python." SDLE Res. Cntr., Case Western Reserve University.
- Bradley, H. A., et al. (2024, June 18). "FAIRmaterials: Python." SDLE Res. Cntr., Case Western Reserve University, Cleveland OH, USA.
- Gordon, E. J., et al. (2024, June 18). "FAIRmaterials: R." SDLE Res. Cntr., Case Western Reserve University.

=== Books ===
- Durability and Reliability of Polymers and Other Materials in Photovoltaic Modules (2019) ISBN 978-0-12-811545-9

=== Selected articles ===
- French, R. H. (1990). Electronic band structure of Al_{2}O_{3}, with comparison to AlO and AIN. Journal of the American Ceramic Society, 73(3), 477–489.
- McNeil, L. E., Grimsditch, M., & French, R. H. (1993). Vibrational spectroscopy of aluminum nitride. Journal of the American Ceramic Society, 76(5), 1132–1136.
- French, R. H., Glass, S. J., Ohuchi, F. S., Xu, Y. N., & Ching, W. Y. (1994). Experimental and theoretical determination of the electronic structure and optical properties of three phases of ZrO_{2}. Physical Review B, 49(8), 5133.
- Van Benthem, K., Elsässer, C., & French, R. H. (2001). Bulk electronic structure of SrTiO_{3}: Experiment and theory. Journal of applied physics, 90(12), 6156–6164.
- French, R. H., Parsegian, V. A., Podgornik, R., Rajter, R. F., Jagota, A., Luo, J., ... & Zemb, T. (2010). Long range interactions in nanoscale science. Reviews of Modern Physics, 82(2), 1887–1944.
- French, R. H., & Tran, H. V. (2009). Immersion lithography: photomask and wafer-level materials. Annual Review of Materials Research, 39(1), 93–126.
- Karimi, A. M., Wu, Y., Koyuturk, M., & French, R. H. (2021, May). Spatiotemporal graph neural network for performance prediction of photovoltaic power systems. In Proceedings of the AAAI conference on artificial intelligence, 35(17), 15323–15330.
- Ciardi, T. G., Nihar, A., Chawla, R., Akanbi, O., Tripathi, P. K., Wu, Y., ... & French, R. H. (2024). Materials data science using CRADLE: A distributed, data-centric approach. MRS Communications, 1–11.
- Yue, W., Mehdi, M. R., Tripathi, P. K., Willard, M. A., Ernst, F., & French, R. H. (2024). Exploring 2D X-ray diffraction phase fraction analysis with convolutional neural networks: Insights from kinematic-diffraction simulations. MRS Advances, 1–8.
- Akanbi, O. D., Bhuvanagiri, D. C., Barcelos, E. I., Nihar, A., Gonzalez Hernandez, B., Yarus, J. M., & French, R. H. (2024). Integrating multiscale geospatial analysis for monitoring crop growth, nutrient distribution, and hydrological dynamics in large-scale agricultural systems. Journal of Geovisualization and Spatial Analysis, 8(1), 9.
