= Colinton Parish Church =

Church in Edinburgh, United Kingdom

Coordinates: 55°54′33″N 3°15′24″W

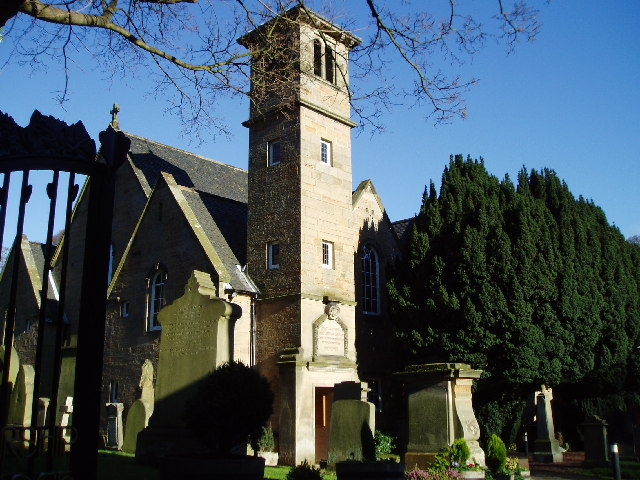
Colinton Church

Colinton Parish Church is a congregation of the Church of Scotland. The church building is located in Dell Road, Colinton, Edinburgh, Scotland next to the Water of Leith.

== History ==
St Cuthbert's Church, originally called the parish of Hailes, was founded in 1095 by Ethelred, Earl of Fife, son of King Malcolm III. The church came under the authority of Dunfermline Abbey and in 1234 this was confirmed in a Papal Bull from Pope Gregory.

In 1248 a rebuilt church was dedicated by David De Bernham but is thought to have been destroyed during the English invasion of 1544. The present church site has existed since 1636 and was rebuilt in 1771 and 1907.

A church has stood on the site for approximately 1000 years, but the current building was constructed and opened in 1908. Later, a new adjacent church hall was added in the 1990s.

The current church was redesigned in 1907-8 by the architect Sydney Mitchell. The church incorporates the tower from the old church, which had been designed by David Bryce and built in 1837. The interior has a neo-Byzantine design, with pink sandstone columns.

In 2001 the congregation had a roll of 1175 members, making it one of the largest church congregations by membership in the Church of Scotland.

== Ministers ==
Several former ministers have served as Moderator of the General Assembly of the Church of Scotland, most recently the Very Reverend Dr William Bryce Johnston (in 1980). The minister is currently the Rev. Rolf Billes. The previous minister was the Reverend Dr George Whyte, who demitted the charge (resigned) in September 2008 to become Clerk to the Church of Scotland's Presbytery of Edinburgh.

- Peter Hewat MA from 1596 to 1598
- James Thomson MA (d.1635) from 1598 to 1634
- William Ogston MA, formerly regent of Marischal College from 1635 to 1639
- Thomas Garvine from 1639 to 1649
- Alexander Livingston (d.1660) from 1650 to 1659
- Robert Bennet (d.1709) from 1659 to 1681
- Thomas Murray from 1682 to 1685
- Samuel Nimmo MA (d.1717) from 1686 to 1691
- James Thomson from 1694 to 1696 then translated to Elgin
- Thomas Paterson from 1697 to 1699 then translated to St Cuthbert's in Edinburgh
- Walter Allan MA (d.1732) from 1700 to 1732
- George Gibson (1706-1746) from 1733 to 1746
- John Hyndman from 1746 to 1752 when he translated to St Cuthbert's (Moderator in 1761)
- Rev Robert Fisher (1715-1782) from 1752 to 1782
- Rev Prof John Walker FRSE (1731-1803) from 1783 to 1803, Moderator in 1790
- John Fleming of Craigs (1750-1824) from 1804 to 1824
- Rev Lewis Balfour (1777-1860) from 1824 to 1860
- Rev William Lockhart DD (1825-1902) from 1861 to 1902, his will paid for the Lockhart Memorial Church in the Grange, Edinburgh
- Norman MacLean MA from 1902 to 1910
- Thomas Marjoribanks (1871-1947) from 1910 to 1947, chief of Clan Marjoribanks
- Very Rev William Bryce Johnston (1921-2005) from 1964 to 1991

== Notable burials ==
- Dr George William Balfour
- Rev Lewis Balfour (1777-1860) minister of Colinton and Robert Louis Stevenson's grandfather
- Edward Burton (engraver) and his great uncle Mungo Burton ARSA
- Alexander Lorne Campbell architect
- Rev Cpt Marcell William Townend Conran, author
- John Gibson (chemist)
- James Gillespie (philanthropist)
- Admiral John Inglis
- Very Rev William Bryce Johnston, Moderator of the Church of Scotland 1980-1
- Sir Matthew Ochterlony, 4th baronet Ochterlony and architect, and his daughter, Gertrude Row-Fogo (d.1917 serving as a nurse)
- Prof James Scott Robson (1921-2010)
- Ramsay Heatley Traquair
- Phoebe Traquair (1840-1912) artist

== Colinton Cemetery ==
A cemetery was added in the late 19th century, to the south of the historic graveyard. This area contains the village war memorial. A relatively rare Norwegian war grave lies in the southern section towards the centre.

The war memorial standing in the centre of the small cemetery, was designed by George Washington Browne. Charles D'Orville Pilkington Jackson cast the bronze tablet with 133 names.The Scotsman newspaper reported its unveiling on 23 March, 1923. Further names were added after the Second World War.

== See also ==
- List of Church of Scotland parishes
