= Neil McVicar (minister) =

Anti-Jacobite minister

Neil McVicar (1672–1747) was a minister of the Church of Scotland. Fluent in both Gaelic and English, McVicar began his ministry in Fort William before moving to Edinburgh's West Kirk in 1707. McVicar was a strong supporter of the Hanoverian succession against waves of Jacobite rebellion throughout the 18th century. He also ministered to Edinburgh's growing Gaelic-speaking population. McVicar remained at the West Kirk until his death in 1747.

== Life ==
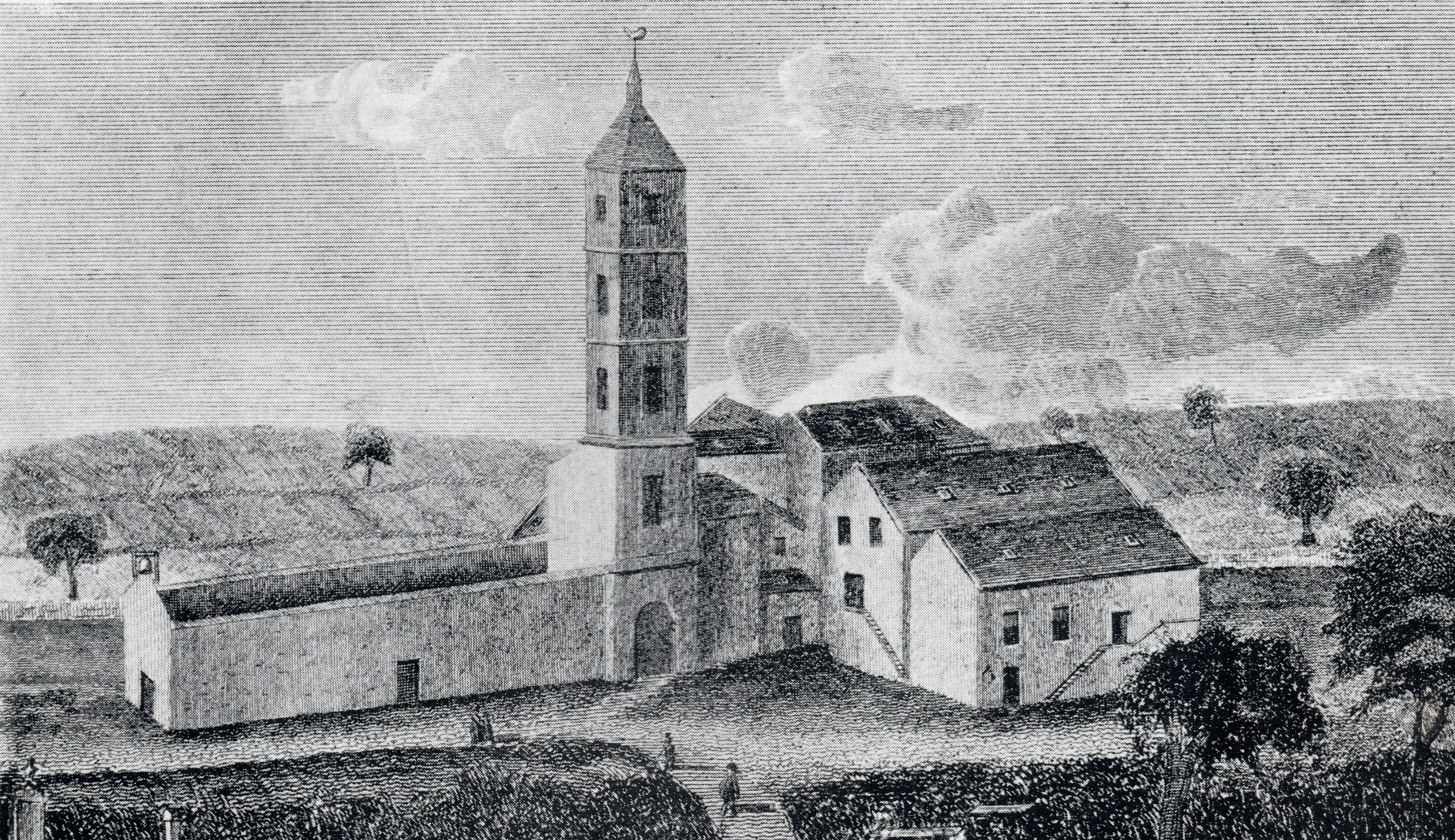
The West Kirk as it appeared during McVicar's ministry

McVicar was born in 1672; his family name literally means "son of the vicar".

He was chaplain of Fort William in the late 17th century. In this role, he served both the English-speaking troops in the fort plus the local Gaelic-speaking locals and was fluent in each. In May 1707 he became minister of Edinburgh's West Kirk: one of the oldest and most important charges in Scotland. This appointment followed the death of David Williamson in 1706, who had previously held the senior charge. McVicar took over from Thomas Paterson, who had moved from the Collegiate charge (McVicar's role) to the first charge. McVicar stayed in his role for over 40 years with several ministers passing through the first charge during his ministry, most notably George Wishart. He was then the only Gaelic-speaking minister in the city and so was charged with providing extra services in Gaelic to the highland inhabitants of the city who could not speak English.

McVicar was strongly anti-Jacobite and also refused the Oath of Abjuration in 1712. In 1729 he was given the formal title of Almoner to George II in Scotland. Although a "traditionalist" he opposed the Law of Patronage along with the majority of Scottish ministers of the period.

During their occupation of Edinburgh during the Rising of 1745, the Jacobites restricted worship within the city churches yet worship continued in St Cuthbert's as usual. McVicar avoided the proclamation to pray for Charles Edward Stuart. McVicar instead offered the prayer: "Bless the King. Thou knowest what King I mean. As for the man that is come among us seeking an earthly crown, we beseech Thee in mercy to take him to Thyself, and give him a crown of glory."

In 1746 Sir James Campbell of Auchinbreck presented him to the congregation of Knapdale but McVicar declined the post.

He died in Edinburgh on 29 January 1747 aged 74 and is buried in the churchyard of St Cuthberts.

== Family ==
He was married twice, firstly in July 1705 to Lillias Dunbar (1686-1732), daughter of Alexander Dunbar WS. Their thirteen children included:

- Hugh McVicar, minister of Dalziel
- Alexander McVicar, merchant in Edinburgh
- Neil McVicar, merchant in Edinburgh
- Jean McVicar, married Rev David Black of Perth
- Marion
- Patrick McVicar WS
- Catherine, Ann, Rachel, Archibald, Lilias, Mary and an unnamed child who died the dy he was born.

Secondly in 1737 he married Bridget Balfour (d.1764), sister of James Balfour of Pilrig.
