= Roger Kenneth French =

British historian (1938–2002)

Roger Kenneth French (12 April 1938 – 14 May 2002) was an English medical historian, specialising in medieval and Renaissance medical history. He was one of the world's leading experts on the anatomical work of William Harvey.

== Biography ==
Roger French was born in Coventry, where his parents ran a butchering and cold-storage business. After attending the King Henry VIII School, Coventry, he matriculated at St Catherine's College, Oxford. There he graduated with a bachelor's degree in zoology, an M.A. in 1961 in medical history, and a PhD in 1965 in medical history. His PhD thesis on the career of the Scottish physician Robert Whytt was supervised by Alistair Cameron Crombie. As a postdoc, French was a research fellow from 1965 to 1966 at the University of Leicester. He held appointments as a lecturer from 1965 to 1968 at the University of Leicester and a lecturer from 1968 to 1975 at the University of Aberdeen. At Aberdeen, his colleagues included George Molland (1941–2002) and Andrew William Wear (b. 1946), who later moved to the University of Cambridge.

In 1975 French became the director of the Wellcome Unit for the History of Science, University of Cambridge, and continued as director until 1995. At the University of Cambridge, he was also from 1975 to 1991 a lecturer in the history of medicine. He was a fellow of Clare College, Cambridge.

As director of the Wellcome Unit of Cambridge University, French worked with several colleagues, including Andrew Cunningham, Andrew William Wear, Luis García Ballester (1936–2000), Iain M. Lonie, Johanna Geyer-Kordesch, and Frank Greenaway, to organise a number of symposia and conferences on various topics in the history of medicine. The results were published in many volumes, including The medical renaissance of the sixteenth century (Cambridge University Press, 1985), Science in the early Roman Empire: Pliny the Elder, his sources and his influence (London, Croom Helm, 1986), The medical revolution of the seventeenth century (Cambridge University Press, 1989), The medical enlightenment of the eighteenth century (Cambridge University Press, 1990), Practical Medicine from Salerno to the Black Death (Cambridge University Press, 1993), and Medicine from the Black Death to the French Disease (Ashgate Publishing, 1998). During French's directorship, the Wellcome Unit flourished in productivity.

Although he specialised in medieval and Renaissance medical history, French's publications covered a wide range from ancient Greek medical texts to 19th century medical reform. He served as a general editor for Routledge's book series Sciences of Antiquity. French was a member of the editorial board of the journal Medical History.

Roger and Patricia Anne French married on 13 August 1966. From their 35-year marriage, there were two daughters and a son.

== Selected publications ==
=== Articles ===
- French, R.K. (1972). "Sauvages, Whytt and the Motion of the Heart: Aspects of Eighteenth Century Animism". Clio Medica. Acta Academiae Internationalis Historiae Medicinae. Vol. 7. pp. 35–54. doi:10.1163/9789004418196_003. ISBN 978-90-04-41819-6.
- French, R. K. (1976). "Alexander Read and the Circulation of the Blood". Bulletin of the History of Medicine. 50 (4): 478–500. JSTOR 44450371. PMID 797415.
- French, R. K. (1978). "The thorax in history 1. From ancient times to Aristotle". Thorax. 33 (1): 10–18. doi:10.1136/thx.33.1.10. PMC 470840. PMID 347628.
- French, R. K. (1978). "The thorax in history. 2. Hellenistic experiment and human dissection". Thorax. 33 (2): 153–166. doi:10.1136/thx.33.2.153. PMC 470865. PMID 351847.
- French, R. K. (1978). "The thorax in history. 3. Beginning of the Middle Ages". Thorax. 33 (3): 295–306. doi:10.1136/thx.33.3.295. PMC 470888. PMID 356335.
- French, R. K. (1978). "The thorax in history. 4. Human dissection and anatomical progress". Thorax. 33 (4): 439–456. doi:10.1136/thx.33.4.439. PMC 470910. PMID 358480.
- French, R. K. (1978). "The thorax in history. 5. Discovery of the pulmonary transit". Thorax. 33 (5): 555–564. doi:10.1136/thx.33.5.555. PMC 470936. PMID 364760.
- French, R. K. (1978). "The thorax in history. 6. Circulation of the blood". Thorax. 33 (6): 714–727. doi:10.1136/thx.33.6.714. PMC 470969. PMID 371058.
- French, R. K. (1979). "De Juvamentis Membrorum and the Reception of Galenic Physiological Anatomy". Isis. 70 (251): 96–109. doi:10.1086/352157. PMID 396271.
- French, Roger K. (1984). "An Origin for the Bone Text of the 'Five-Figure Series'". Sudhoffs Archiv. 68 (2): 143–156. JSTOR 20776928. PMID 6241360.
- French, Roger K. (1994). "The Languages of William Harvey's Natural Philosophy". Journal of the History of Medicine and Allied Sciences. 49 (1): 24–51. doi:10.1093/jhmas/49.1.24. PMID 8151114.
- French, R. K. (1994). "Putting animals on the map: The natural history of the Hereford Mappa Mundi". Archives of Natural History. 21 (3): 289–308. doi:10.3366/anh.1994.21.3.289.

=== Books ===
- French, R. K. (1969). Robert Whytt, the Soul and Medicine. Wellcome Institute of the History of Medicine, Publications, New series, volume 17. London: Wellcome Institute of the History of Medicine. ISBN 0854840044. LCCN 71596214.
- Anatomical Education in a Scottish University, 1620: An Annotated Translation of the Lecture Notes of John Moir. Translated by Roger Kenneth French. Aberdeen: Equipress. 1975; 86 pages
- French, R. K. (1979). The History of the Heart. Aberdeen: Equipress. (first published in the journal Thorax, volume 33, 1978, in several instalments)
- The History and Virtues of Cyder (1st ed.). London: St. Martin's Press. 1982. ISBN 0312374127.
- Wear, A.; French, R. K.; Lonie, I. M., eds. (7 March 1985). The Medical Renaissance of the Sixteenth Century. Cambridge University Press. ISBN 978-0-521-30112-1.
- French, Roger; Greenaway, Frank, eds. (1986). Science in the early Roman Empire: Pliny the Elder, his sources and influence. Totowa, New Jersey: Barnes & Noble Books. ISBN 0389206342. LCCN 86007919.
- French, Roger Kenneth; Wear, Andrew, eds. (28 September 1989). The Medical Revolution of the Seventeenth Century. Cambridge University Press. ISBN 978-0-521-35510-0.
  - pbk edition. Robert Hall Ltd. 2010. ISBN 978-0709091226.
- Cunningham, Andrew; French, Roger, eds. (19 July 1990). The Medical Enlightenment of the Eighteenth Century. Cambridge University Press. ISBN 978-0-521-38235-9. LCCN 89017258; xi+330 pages, illustrated
- French, Roger; Wear, Andrew, eds. (1991). British medicine in an age of reform. The Wellcome Series in the History of Medicine. London; New York: Routledge. ISBN 0415056225. LCCN 90009163; xi+260 pages
- Wear, Andrew; French, Roger Kenneth; Geyer-Kordesch, Johanna, eds. (1993). Doctors and Ethics: The Earlier Historical Setting of Professional Ethics. Rodopi. ISBN 90-5183-553-1.
- French, R. K. (1994). William Harvey's natural philosophy. Cambridge, England; New York: Cambridge University Press. ISBN 0521455359. LCCN 93036181; xii+393 pages, illustrated; brief description at Cambridge University Press
- French, Roger (1994). Ancient natural history: histories of nature. Sciences of Antiquity. London; New York: Routledge. ISBN 9780415115452. LCCN 94005131.
  - French, Roger (8 August 2005). 2005 pbk edition. Routledge. ISBN 978-1-134-96268-6.
  - French, Roger (8 August 2005). 2005 ebook edition. Routledge. ISBN 978-1-134-96267-9.
- Garcia-Ballester, Luis; French, Roger; Arrizabalaga, Jon; Cunningham, Andrew, eds. (1994). Practical Medicine from Salerno to the Black Death. Cambridge University Press. ISBN 0521431018. front matter description, Cambridge University Press
- French, Roger; Cunningham, Andrew (1996). Before science: the invention of the friars' natural philosophy. Aldershot, Hants; Brookfield, Vermont: Scolar Press, Routledge. ISBN 1859282873. LCCN 95047878; pbk.; 298 pages; illustrated; abstract & table of contents at Taylor & Francis website
- Arrizabalaga, Jon; Henderson, John; French, Roger Kenneth (January 1997). The Great Pox: The French Disease in Renaissance Europe. Yale University Press. ISBN 0-300-06934-0.
- French, Roger; Arrizabalaga, Jon; Cunningham, Andrew; Garcia-Ballester, Luis, eds. (1998). Medicine from the Black Death to the French disease. Aldershot, Hants; Brookfield, Vermont: Ashgate.
  - 2019 ebook edition. Routledge. 16 July 2019. ISBN 978-0-429-51501-9.
- French, Roger (1999). Dissection and vivisection in the European Renaissance. History of Medicine in Context. Aldershot, England; Brookfield, Vermont, USA: Ashgate. ISBN 1859283616. LCCN 98046875; hbk.; viii+289 pages; illustrated
- French, Roger (2000). Ancients and moderns in the medical sciences: from Hippocrates to Harvey. Aldershot, Hampshire, England; Brookfield, Vermont, USA: Routledge. ISBN 9780860788348.
- French, Roger Kenneth (2001). Canonical Medicine: Gentile da Foligno and Scholasticism. Leiden: Brill. ISBN 90-04-11707-5. LCCN 2002265552.
- French, Roger Kenneth (20 February 2003). Medicine Before Science: The Business of Medicine from the Middle Ages to the Enlightenment. Cambridge University Press. ISBN 978-0-521-00761-0.
  - Medicine before Science: The Rational and Learned Doctor from the Middle Ages to the Enlightenment. LCCN 2002067729; pbk.; v+289 pages
- Asúa, Miguel de; French, Roger (2005). New world of animals: early modern Europeans on the creatures of Iberian America. Aldershot, Hants, England; Burlington, Vermont, USA: Ashgate.
  - 2017 ebook edition. Routledge. 2 March 2017. ISBN 978-1-351-96214-8.
