= George William Balfour =

Scottish physician (1823–1903)

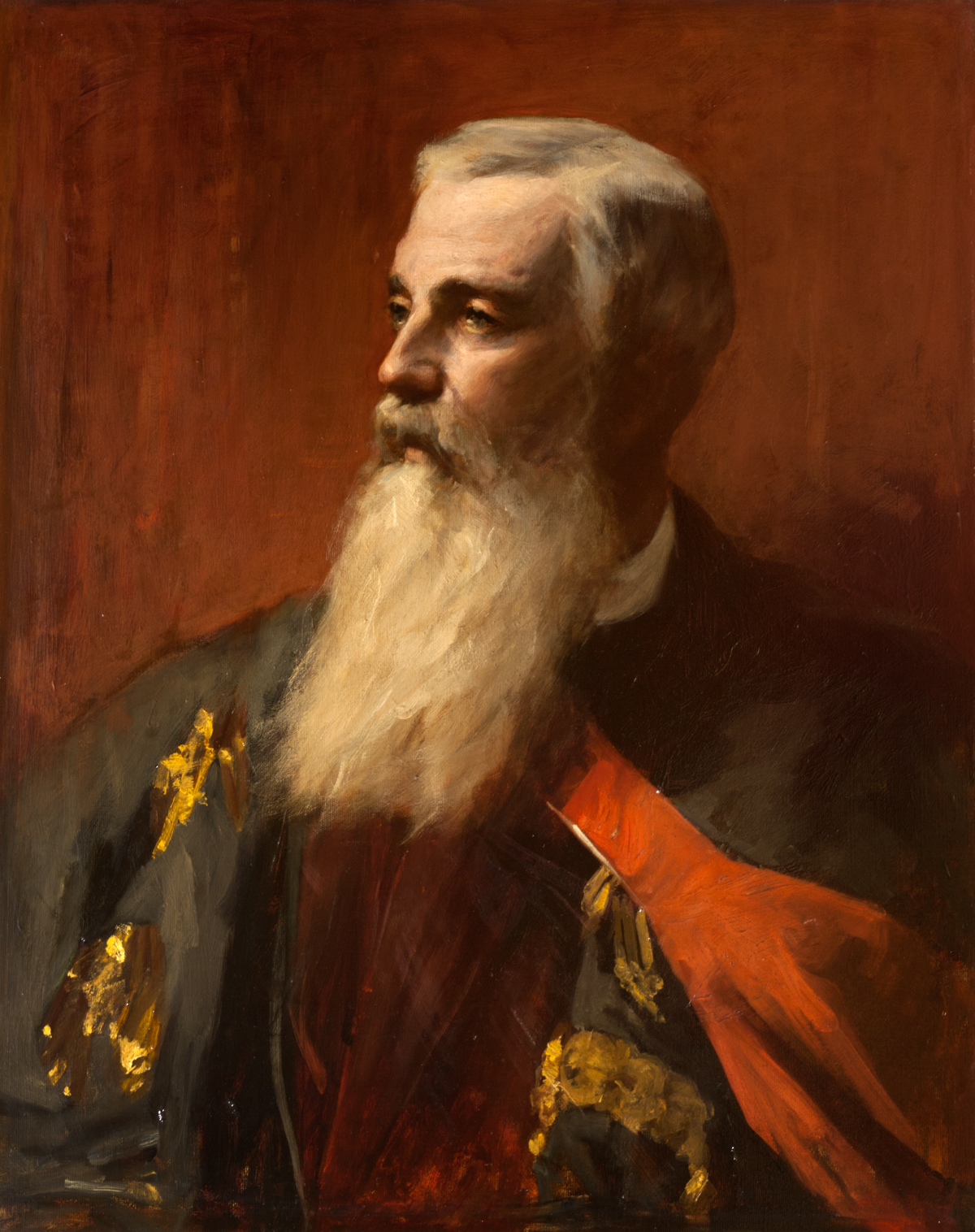
- George William Balfour, portrait by John Dick Bowie
- Born: 2 June 1823; Sorn, Ayrshire, Scotland
- Died: 9 August 1903 (aged 80); Colinton, Edinburgh, Scotland

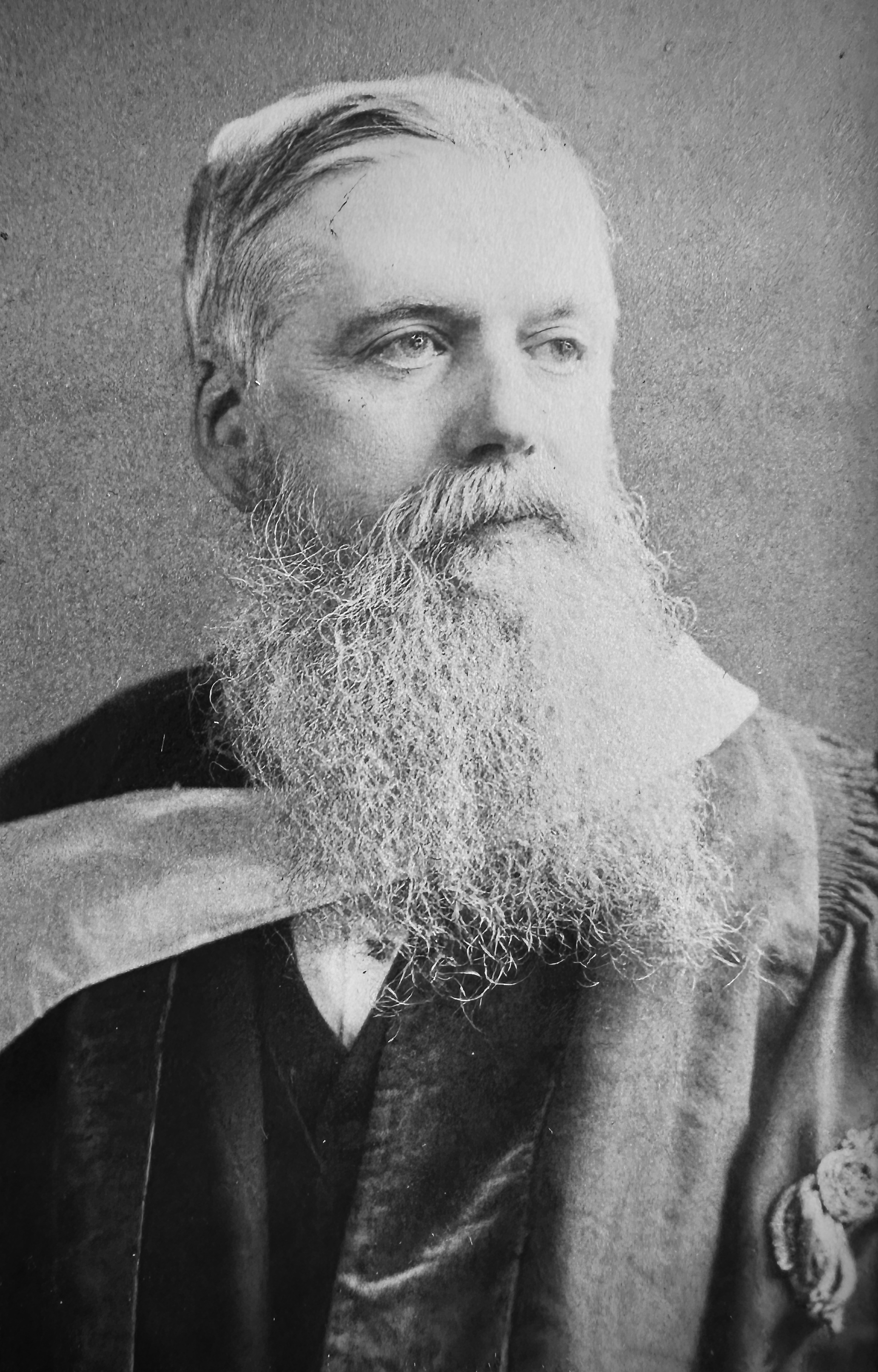

George William Balfour FRSE (2 June 1823 – 9 August 1903) was a Scottish physician, known as a heart specialist.

== Early life and education ==
Born at the manse of Sorn, Ayrshire, on 2 June 1823, he was the sixth son and eighth of the thirteen children of Rev Lewis Balfour DD (1777–1860), by his wife Henrietta Scott, third daughter of George Smith, D.D., minister of Galston; James Balfour was a brother, Thomas Stevenson was a brother-in-law, and Robert Louis Stevenson was a nephew. After education at Colinton, he planned first to study veterinary science and settle in Australia; but entered the Medical School of Edinburgh. In 1845 he graduated M.D. at the University of St. Andrews, and was licensed by the Royal College of Surgeons of Edinburgh.

== Career ==
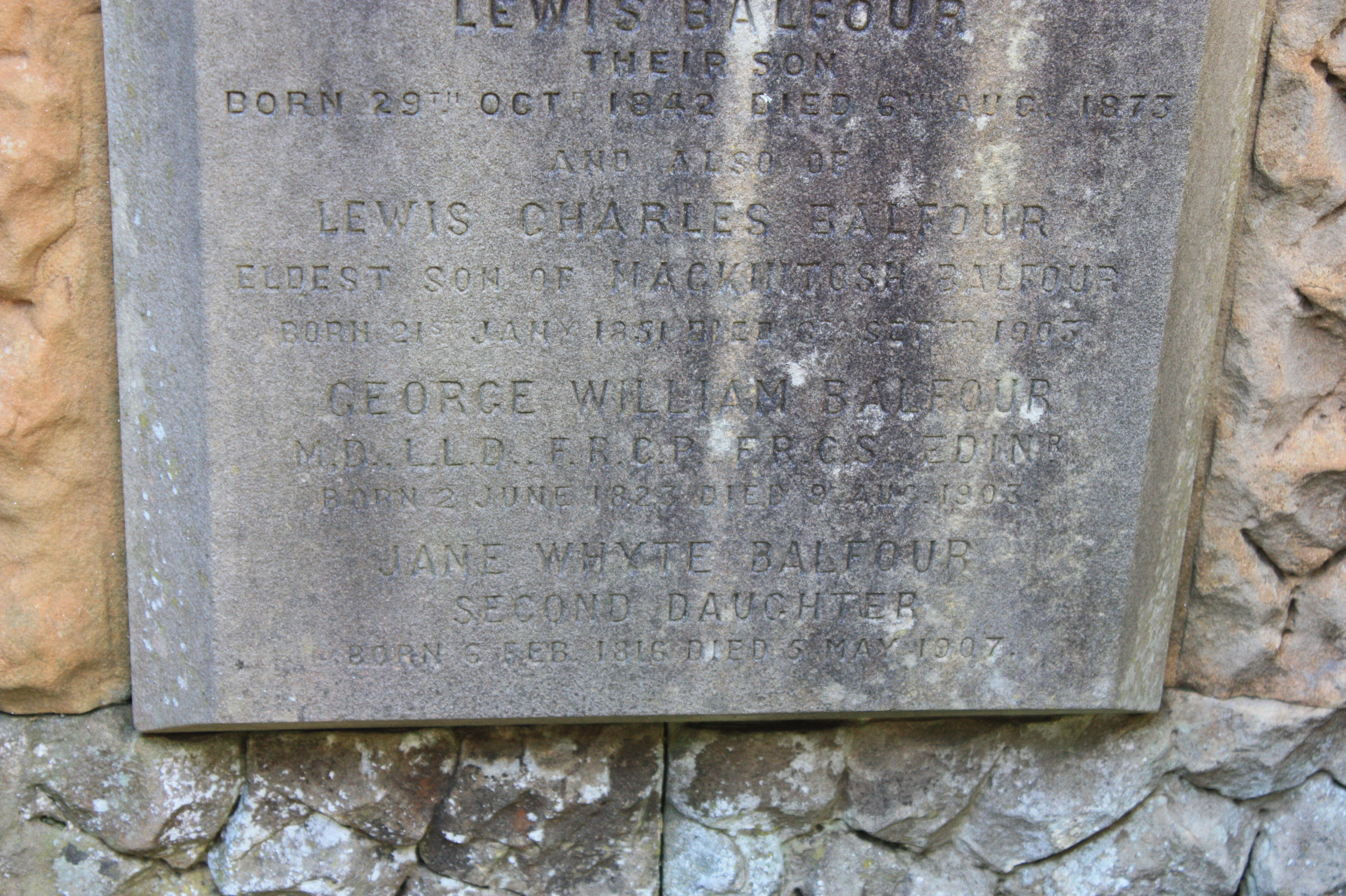
The grave of Dr George William Balfour, Colinton Churchyard

After acting as house surgeon to the Edinburgh Royal Maternity Hospital, Balfour in 1846 went to Vienna, where he studied under Joseph Škoda, Carl Ludwig Sigmund, and Wilhelm Fleischmann the homeopath. Balfour was a general practitioner in Midlothian from 1846 till 1857 when he returned to Edinburgh and practised as a physician on becoming F.R.C.P. Edinburgh in 1861. In 1866 he was appointed physician to the Royal Hospital for Sick Children, and from 1867 he was physician to the Royal Infirmary, being appointed consulting physician in 1882, on the expiry of his term of office. During this time he was a lecturer in medicine at the Edinburgh Extramural School of Medicine.

Balfour specialised in diseases of the heart and circulation and became a leading figure of his time in this area together with Sir William Tennant Gairdner in Glasgow, and Charles Hilton Fagge in London. In 1850 he was elected a member of the Harveian Society of Edinburgh and served as president in 1887. He was a librarian at the Royal College of Physicians of Edinburgh from 1873 to 1882 and from 1887 to 1899. He was president of the College 1882-4 and was a member of the University Court of St. Andrews for many years. In 1883 he was elected a member of the Aesculapian Club. He received the honorary degree of LL.D. at Edinburgh in 1884, and at St. Andrews in 1896. He was appointed physician in ordinary to Queen Victoria in 1900 and honorary physician to King Edward VII in 1901.

In 1899 Balfour retired from the town centre of Edinburgh to live in Colinton, on the southwest outskirts of the city, where he died on 9 August 1903. He is buried in the Balfour vault on the north side of Colinton Parish Church. His obituary was written by his colleague James Ormiston Affleck.

== Works ==
On his return from Austria, in 1846, Balfour published papers on "The Treatment of Pneumonia as practiced by Skoda"; "Necrosis of the Jaw induced by Phosphorus as taught by Sigmund"; and "The Homœopathic Treatment of Acute Diseases by Fleischmann". For the New Sydenham Society he translated (1861–5) the Hand-book of the Practice of Forensic Medicine, by Johann Ludwig Casper. In 1865 he published An Introduction to the Study of Medicine.

In 1868, following a suggestion of his father-in-law, Dr. James Craig of Ratho, he wrote two papers on "The Treatment of Aneurysm by Iodide of Potassium". His standing as a cardiologist rested on Clinical Lectures on Diseases of the Heart and Aorta (1876) and The Senile Heart (1894).

== Family ==
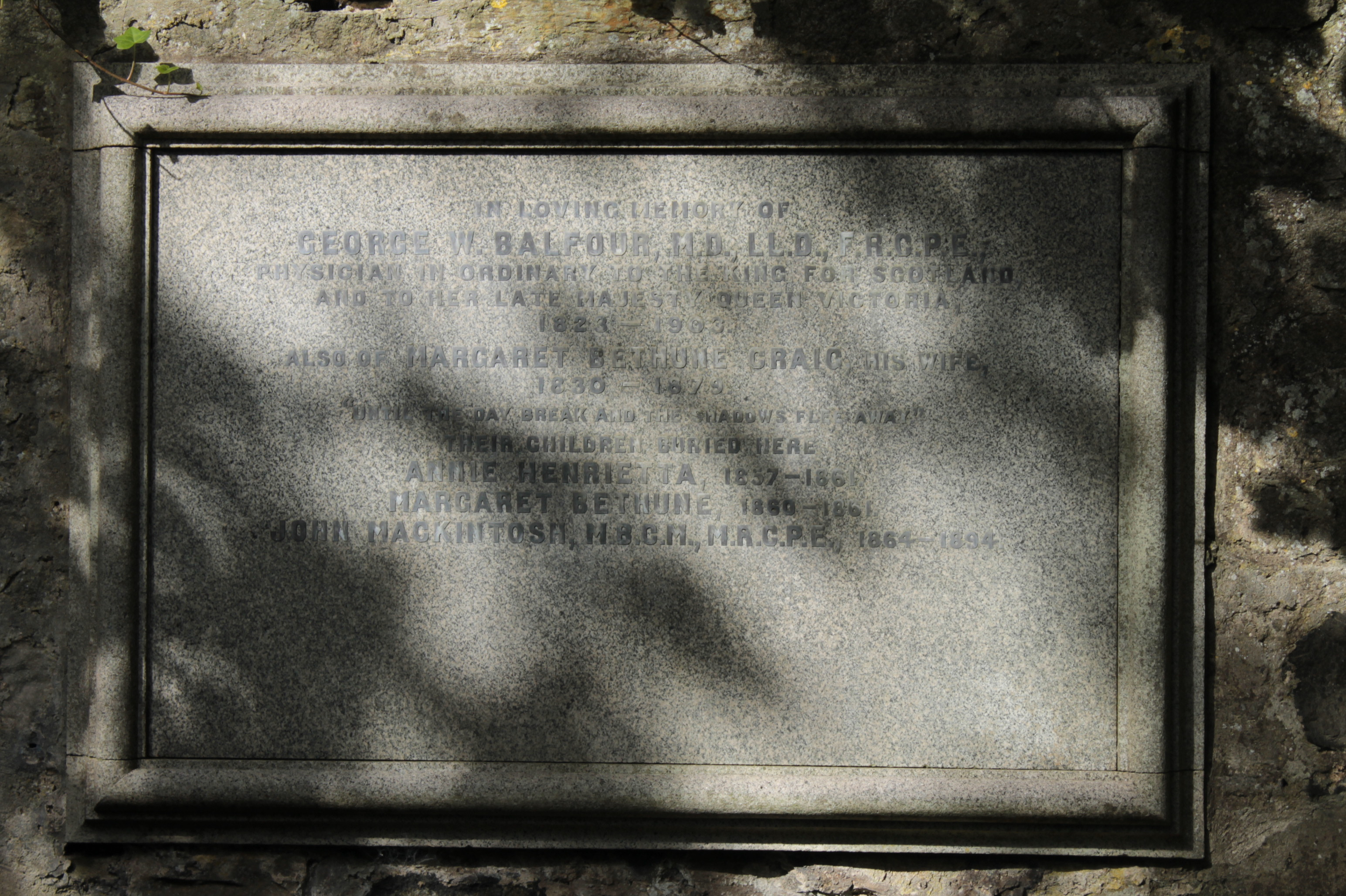
Grave of the Second Wife and Children of George W Balfour, Ratho Churchyard

Balfour married three times:

1. in 1848 to Agnes (d. 1851), daughter of George Thomson, by whom he had one son, Lewis;
2. in 1854 to Margaret Bethune (d. 1879), eldest daughter of Dr. James Craig, of Ratho, by whom he had eight sons and three daughters; and
3. in 1881 to Henrietta, daughter of John Usher, who survived him.

== Notes ==
Attribution

This article incorporates text from a publication now in the public domain: Lee, Sidney, ed. (1912). "Balfour, George William". Dictionary of National Biography (2nd supplement). Vol. 1. London: Smith, Elder & Co.
