= Robert Whytt =

Scottish physician (1714–1766)

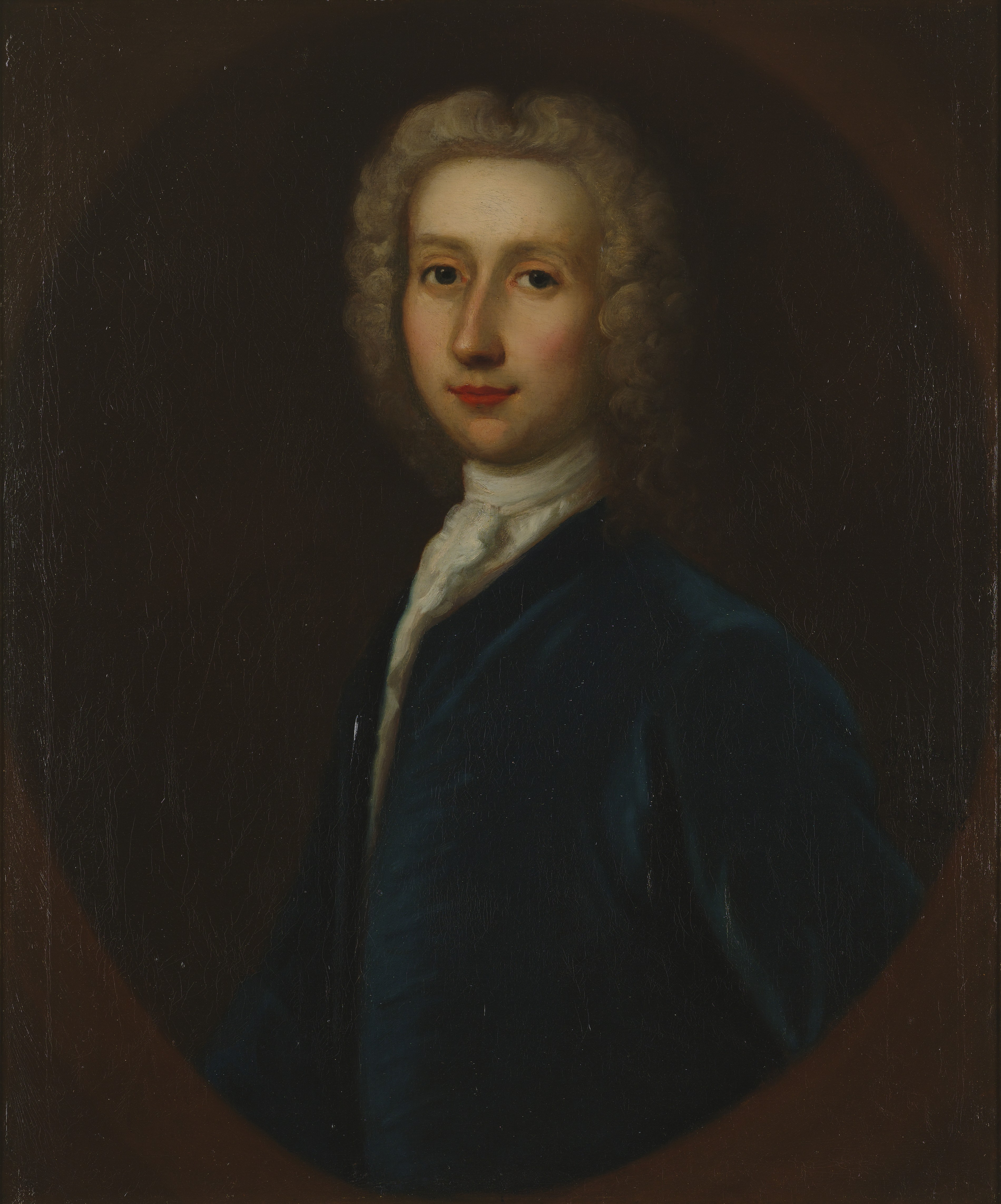
Painting of Robert Whytt by G.B. Bellucci ca. 1738

Robert Whytt (1714–1766) was a Scottish physician. His work, on unconscious reflexes, tubercular meningitis, urinary bladder stones, and hysteria, is remembered now most for his book on diseases of the nervous system. He served as President of the Royal College of Physicians of Edinburgh.

== Life ==
The second son of Robert Whytt of Bennochy (near Kirkcaldy in Fife), advocate, and Jean, daughter of Antony Murray of Woodend, Perthshire, he was born in Edinburgh on 6 September 1714, six months after his father's death. Having graduated M.A. at the University of St Andrews in 1730, he went to Edinburgh to study medicine. Two years before this he had succeeded, on the death of his elder brother George, to the family estate.

Whytt devoted himself to the study of anatomy, under the first Monro. Going to London in 1734, Whytt became a pupil of William Cheselden, while he visited the wards of the London hospitals. After this he attended the lectures of Jacob B. Winslow in Paris, of Herman Boerhaave and Bernhard Siegfried Albinus at Leyden. He took the degree of M.D. at Reims on 2 April 1736. On 3 June 1737, a similar degree was conferred on him by the University of St Andrews, and on 21 June he became a licentiate of the Royal College of Physicians of Edinburgh. On 27 November 1738, he was elected to the fellowship, and began practice as a physician.

On 26 August 1747, Whytt was appointed professor of the theory of medicine in Edinburgh University. On 16 April 1752 Whytt was elected Fellow of the Royal Society of London, and contributed to the Philosophical Transactions. In 1756 he gave lectures on chemistry in the university in place of John Rutherford (1695–1779). In 1761 Whytt was made first physician to King George III in Scotland—a post specially created for him—and on 1 December 1763 he was elected president of the Royal College of Physicians of Edinburgh; he held the presidency till his death at Edinburgh on 15 April 1766 at age 52.

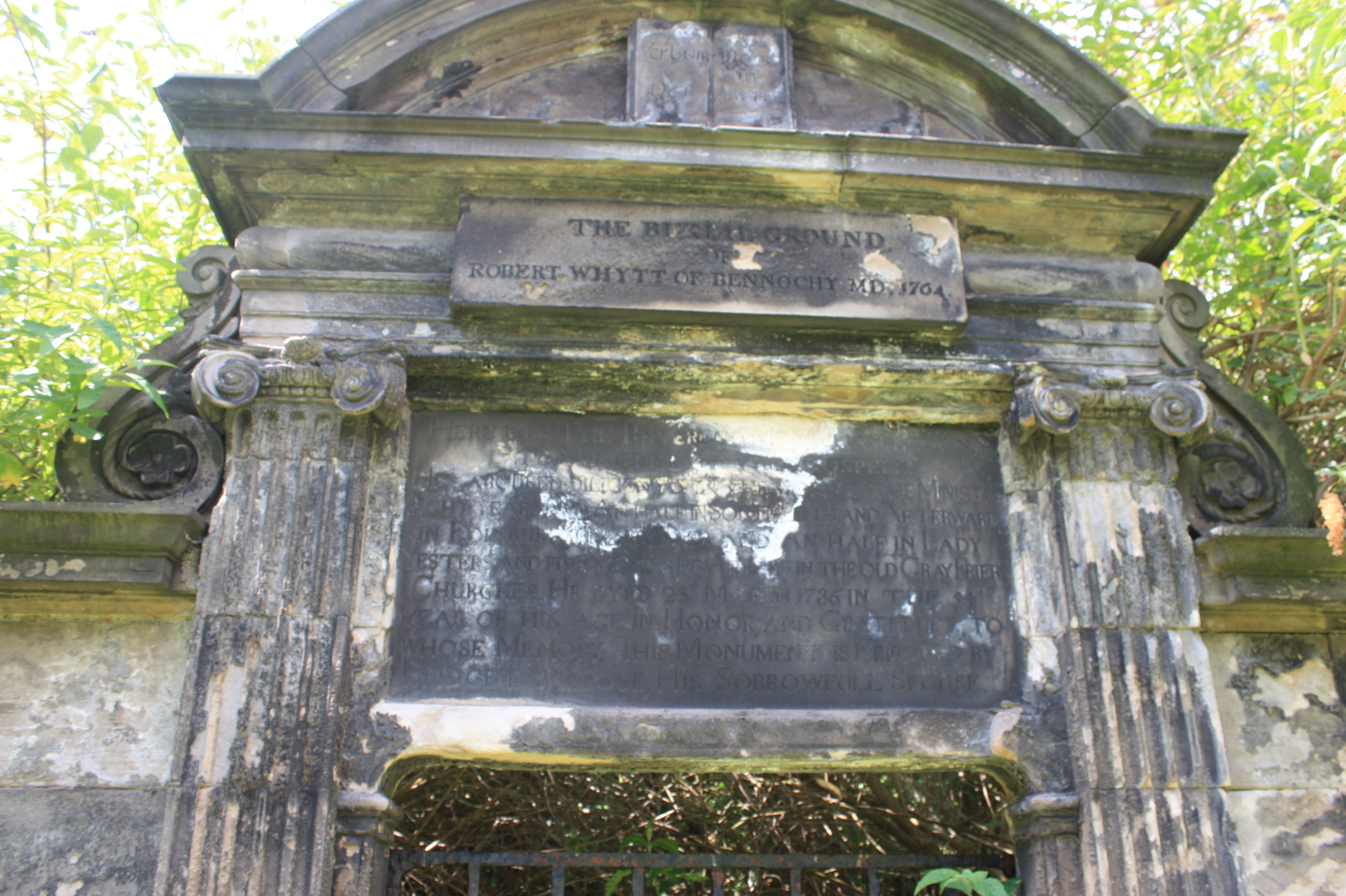
The grave of Robert Whytt, Greyfriars Kirkyard

His remains were given a public funeral, and were interred in a private vault (built two years earlier) in the now sealed section of Greyfriars Kirkyard known as the Covenanter's Prison.

== Neurophysiology ==
Robert Whytt is one of the most accomplished neurophysiologists of his time. In his research, he outlined the significance of the central nervous system on movement, drew distinctions between voluntary and involuntary actions and clarified the components of the light reflex within the eye.

=== Central nervous system ===
Whytt's theories on the nervous system and its role in movement opposed many of the teachings that were in place in the 18th century. During that time, many physiologists still supported Descartes' theory of movement which hypothesized that muscle contraction was due to the activation of fluid in the nervous system called animal spirits. Physiologists, such as Whytt's colleague, Albrecht von Haller, also believed that muscles were capable of action independent of the nerves. Whytt strongly advocated against Descartes' theory, and explicitly denied the concept of animal spirits. Furthermore, he rejected Haller's theory by claiming that movement must depend on interconnecting nerves that lead to the brain or spinal cord.

Whytt decided to prove his theory through experimentation. He replicated Stephen Hales' experiment that consisted of probing and examining the response of limbs in decapitated frogs. In Whytt's version of the experiment, he inserted a hot wire through the spine of the decapitated frog and observed that when the spine of the frog was destroyed, no form of pricking or cutting of the frog's limb elicited a response. If the frog's spine stayed intact as it did in Hales' experiment, the limbs continued to respond to the pricking and cutting. Additionally, Whytt tested to see if a response could still be created if certain sections of the spinal cord remained intact. The results show that as long as the spinal cord is partially undamaged, small responses in the limbs can still be produced.

The experiment led Whytt to conclude that the spinal cord was a crucial component in facilitating response action to stimuli. The proof that movement still occurs after decapitation disproves Descartes' animal spirits in muscles. Likewise, the relationship between the spinal cord and response action in the limbs disproves Haller's theory of movement. The response movement will later be described as "reflex action" by Marshall Hall.

=== Voluntary and involuntary motion ===
Another theory that opposed Whytt's ideas during his time was the position of Stahl's animism. Animism downplayed the importance of the brain and nerves in movement and attributed it predominantly to the soul. Whytt acknowledges the presence and importance of the soul, but unlike Stahl's animism, he does not agree that motion is controlled exclusively in the soul. In 1745, Whytt published An Equiry Into the Cause Which Promote the Circulation of Fluids in the Small Vessels of Animals where he states that the soul, also referred to as the sentient principle, and the body hold equal influence over movement and therefore may govern both voluntary and involuntary action. Voluntary action is movement excited by one's will whereas involuntary action is dependent on the stimulus that is applied to the muscle or nerve of the muscle.

He explains that the soul lives concurrently with the body and gives it life. In the brain, the soul has a conscious which is gives us the ability to reason. In the muscles, the soul has the power of producing motion. In the nerves, the soul gives us the ability to feel. Whytt uses the sentient principle to explain the agent that is responsible for movement but he does not address, nor does he feel the need to address, how the soul can act on the physical body.

=== Pupillary light reflex ===
Whytt explains that the pupillary light reflex is the contractions and re-sizing of the pupil in different intensities of light. If the eye was incapable of contraction, we would only be able to see in one degree of light and we would not be able to differentiate the distance of light reflecting from near and far objects. Whytt discovers the pupillary light reflex based on an autopsy of a child suffering from hydrocephalus whose pupils were noted to be unresponsive to changes in light. In the autopsy, Whytt discovered a cyst compressing the optic thalamus in child's eye. Whytt concluded that the obstruction prevented the eye from contracting properly, therefore, limiting the child's eyesight. The pupillary light reflex is later named the Whytt Reflex.

== Works ==
In 1743 Whytt published a paper in the Edinburgh Medical Essays entitled "On the Virtues of Lime-Water in the Cure of Stone". This paper attracted attention and was published, with additions, separately in 1752, and ran through several editions. It also appeared in French and German. Whytt's treatment of the stone by limewater and soap became obsolete.

In 1751 he published a work On the Vital and other Involuntary Motions of Animals. The book attracted the attention of the physiologists of Europe. Whytt dropped the doctrine of Stahl that the rational soul is the cause of involuntary motions in animals, and ascribed such movements to the effect of a stimulus acting on an unconscious sentient principle. He had a vigorous controversy with Albrecht von Haller on the subject of this work.

In 1764 he published his major work, On Nervous, Hypochondriac, or Hysteric Diseases, to which are prefixed some Remarks on the Sympathy of the Nerves. It was translated into French by Achille Guillaume Le Bègue de Presle in 1767.

Whytt was also author of:

- Physiological Essays (1755)
- Review of the Controversy Concerning the Sensibility and Moving Power of the Parts of Men and Other Animals (1761)
- Nervous, Hypochondriac or Hysteric Diseases, (1st ed. 1764)
- Observations on Dropsy of the Brain (1768)

An edition of his Works was issued by his son in 1768, and was translated into German by Christian Ehrhardt Kapp in 1771 (Leipzig). A complete list of his papers is in Robert Watt's Bibliotheca Britannica.

== Family ==
He was twice married. His first wife, Helen, sister of James Robertson, governor of New York, died in 1741, leaving no children. In 1743 he married Louisa, daughter of James Balfour of Pilrig in Midlothian, who died in 1764. By his second wife Whytt had six surviving children. His grandson Lewis Balfour was the grandfather of Robert Louis Stevenson.

Whytt's son John, who changed his name to Whyte, became heir to the entailed estates of General Melville of Strathkinness, and took the name of Melville in addition to his own. He was grandfather of Captain George John Whyte-Melville.

== Biography ==
- Carmichael, Leonard, Robert Whytt: A Contribution to the History of Physiological Psychology, London: US: Psychological Review Company. 1927
- French, R. K., Robert Whytt, the Soul, and Medicine, London: The Wellcome Institute of the History of Medicine, 1969
- Hodge, C. F., A Sketch of the History of Reflex Action: I. Beginnings and Development to the time of Charles Bell, US: University of Illinois Press, 1890
- Rocca, Julius, William Cullen (1710–1790) and Robert Whytt (1714–1766) on the Nervous System, New York: Springer, 2007
- Whytt, Robert, Of the Motions of the Pupil and Muscles of the Internal Ear, Edinburgh, Great Britain: Hamilton, Balfour, and Neill, 1751
- Whytt, Robert, Of the Share Which the Mind has in Producing the Vital and Other Involuntary Motions of Animals, Edinburgh, Great Britain: Hamilton, Balfour, and Neill, 1751
