= 2011 New Year Honours (New Zealand) =

Annual awards for New Zealanders

- Previous: 2010 Queen's Birthday Honours; Next: 2011 New Zealand bravery awards
- Type: New Zealand royal honours: Order of New Zealand; New Zealand Order of Merit; Queen's Service Order; Queen's Service Medal; New Zealand Distinguished Service Decoration
- Date: 31 December 2010
- Country: New Zealand
- Total recipients: 165

The 2011 New Year Honours in New Zealand were appointments by Elizabeth II in her right as Queen of New Zealand, on the advice of the New Zealand government, to various orders and honours to reward and highlight good works by New Zealanders, and to celebrate the passing of 2010 and the beginning of 2011. They were announced on 31 December 2010.

The recipients of honours are listed here as they were styled before their new honour.

== Order of New Zealand (ONZ) ==
Ordinary member

- Sir Robert James Charles KNZM CBE – of Oxford. For services to New Zealand.
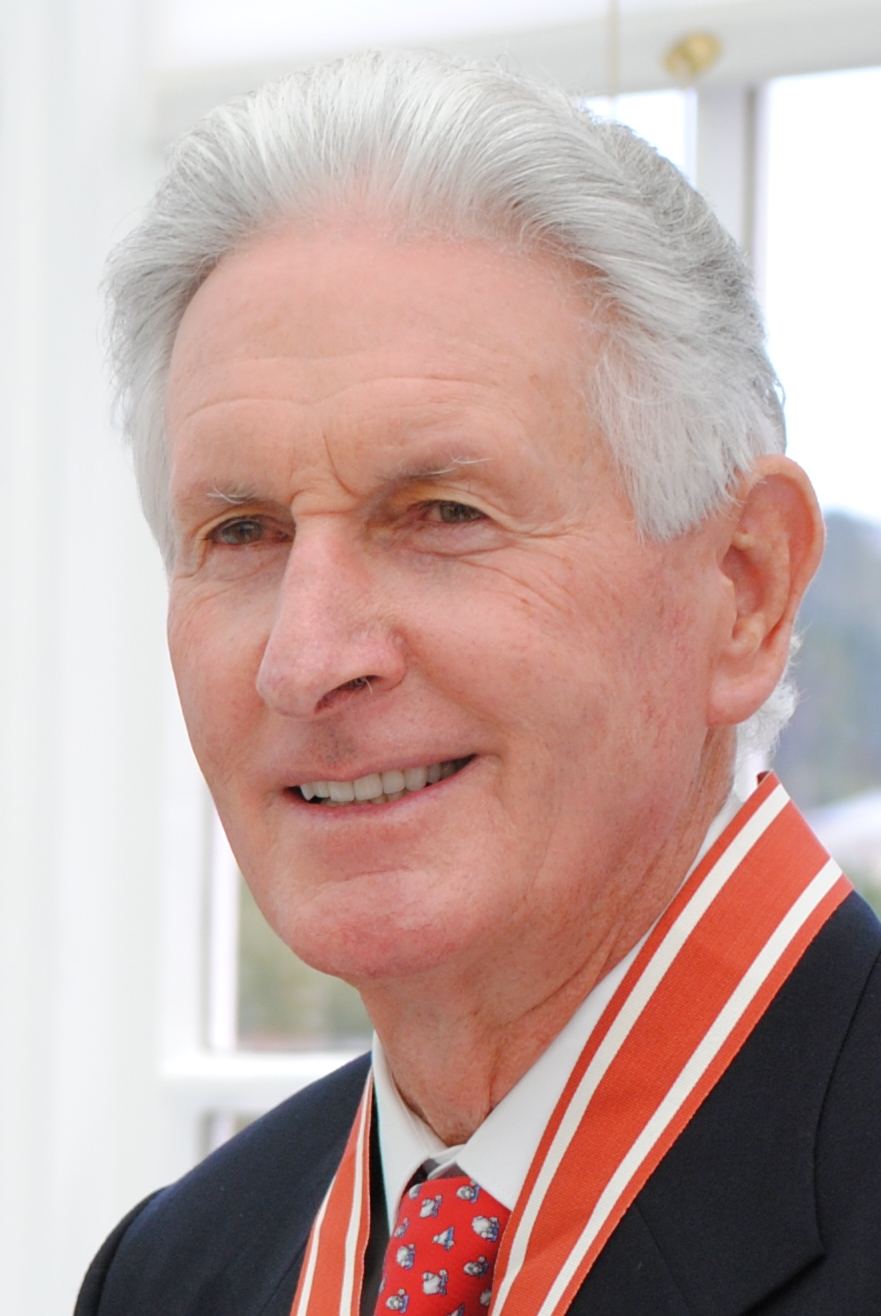
Sir Bob Charles

== New Zealand Order of Merit ==
=== Knight Grand Companion (GNZM) ===
- Raymond John Avery – of Auckland. For services to philanthropy.
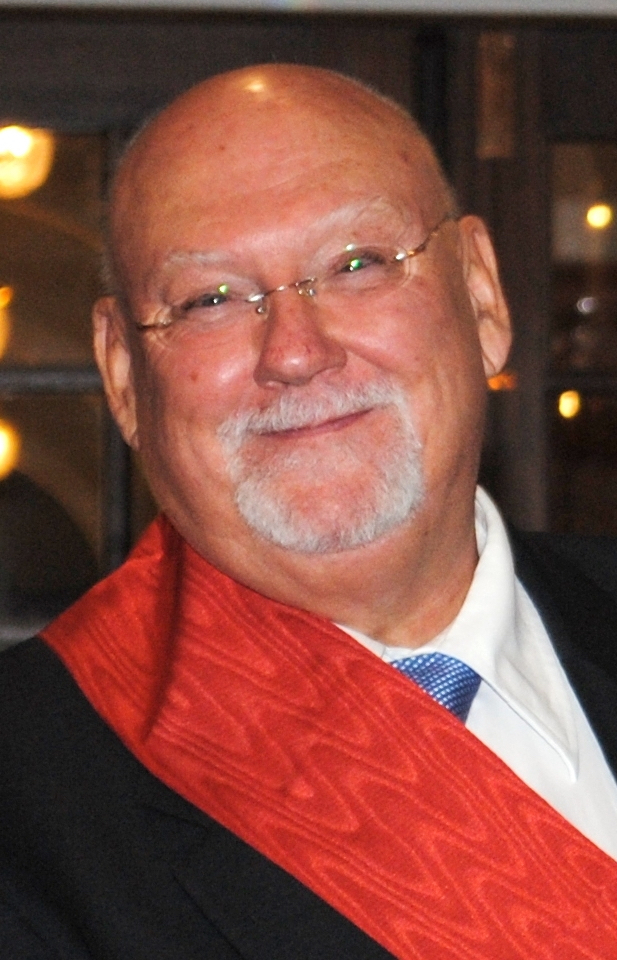
Sir Ray Avery

=== Dame Companion (DNZM) ===
- Alison Margaret Holst CBE QSM – of Auckland. For services to the food industry.
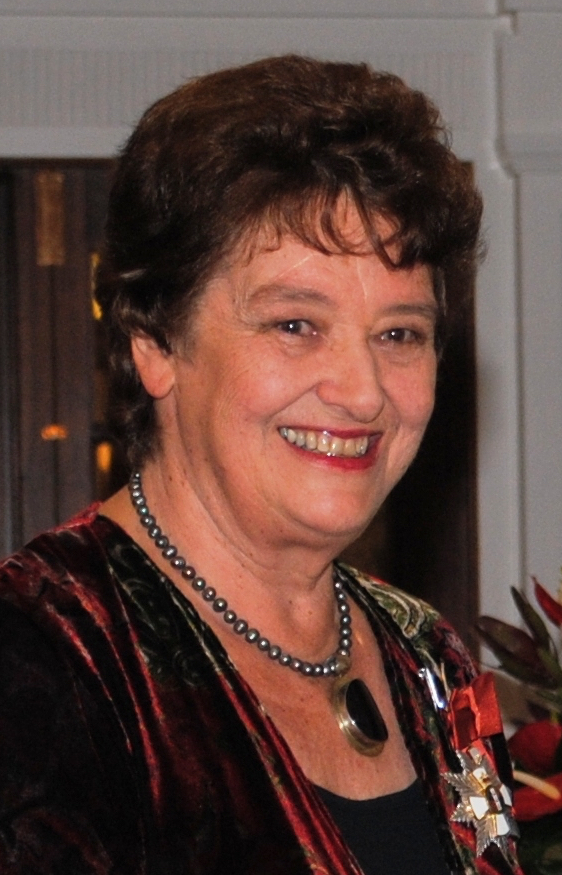
Dame Alison Holst

=== Knight Companion (KNZM) ===
- The Honourable William David Baragwanath – of Wellington. For services as a judge of the Court of Appeal.
- William Murray Gallagher CNZM MBE – of Hamilton. For services to business.
- Richard Michael Hill CNZM – of Arrowtown. For services to business and the arts.
- James Henry Peter McNeish – of Wellington. For services to literature.
- Emeritus Professor Tamati Muturangi Reedy – of Wellington. For services to education.
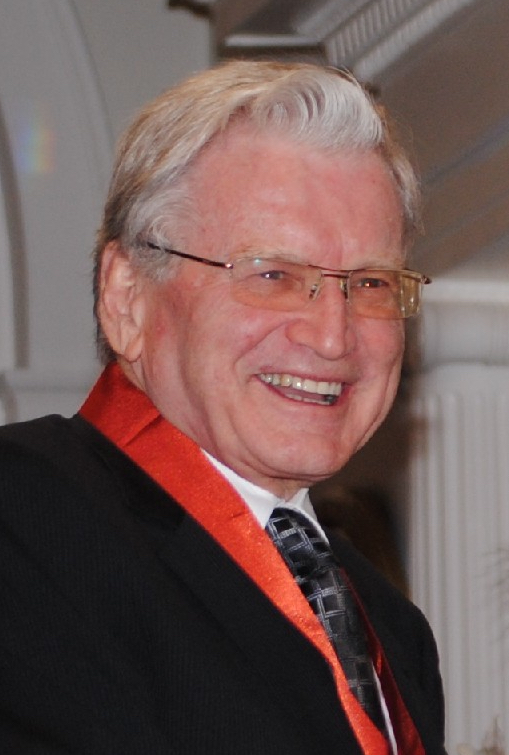
Sir William Gallagher

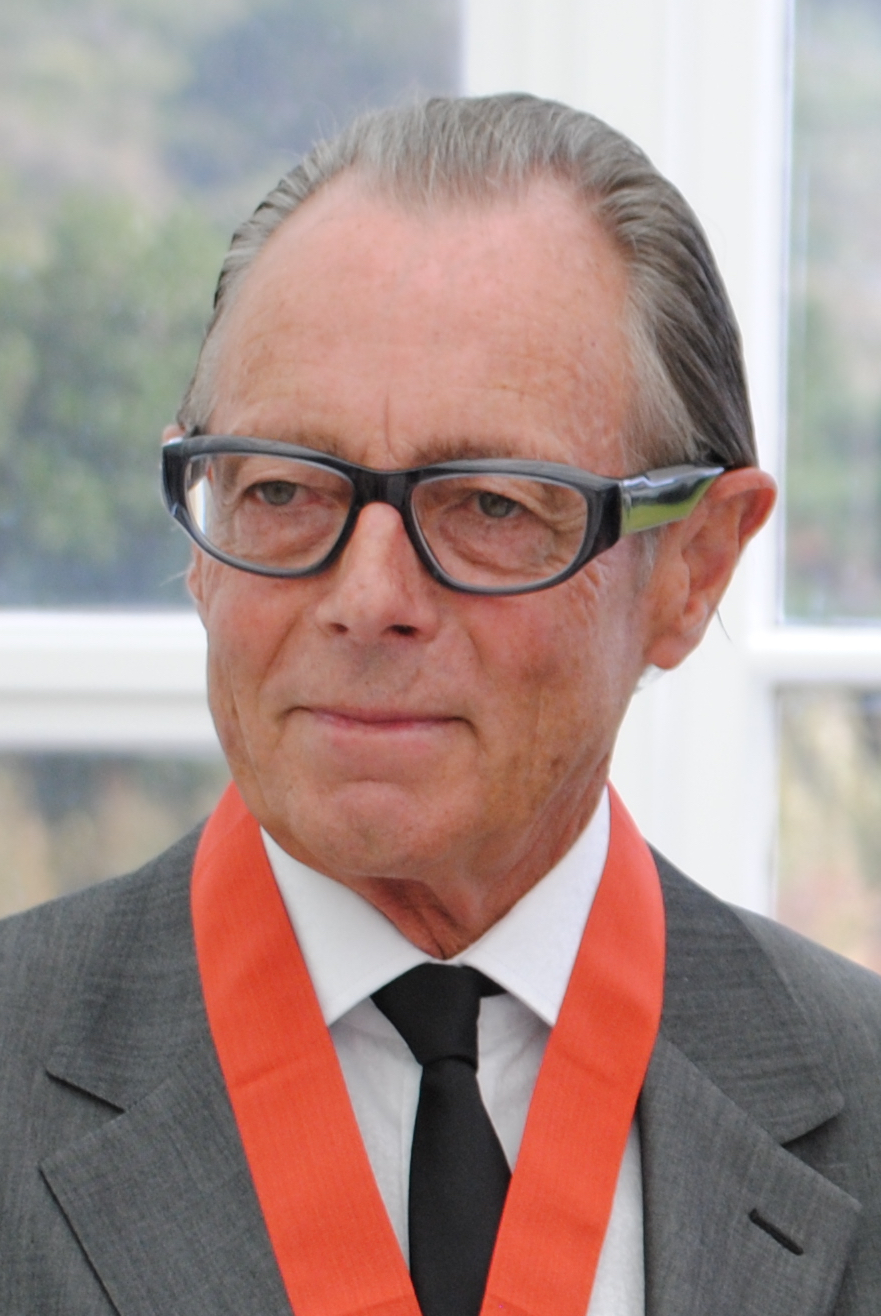
Sir Michael Hill

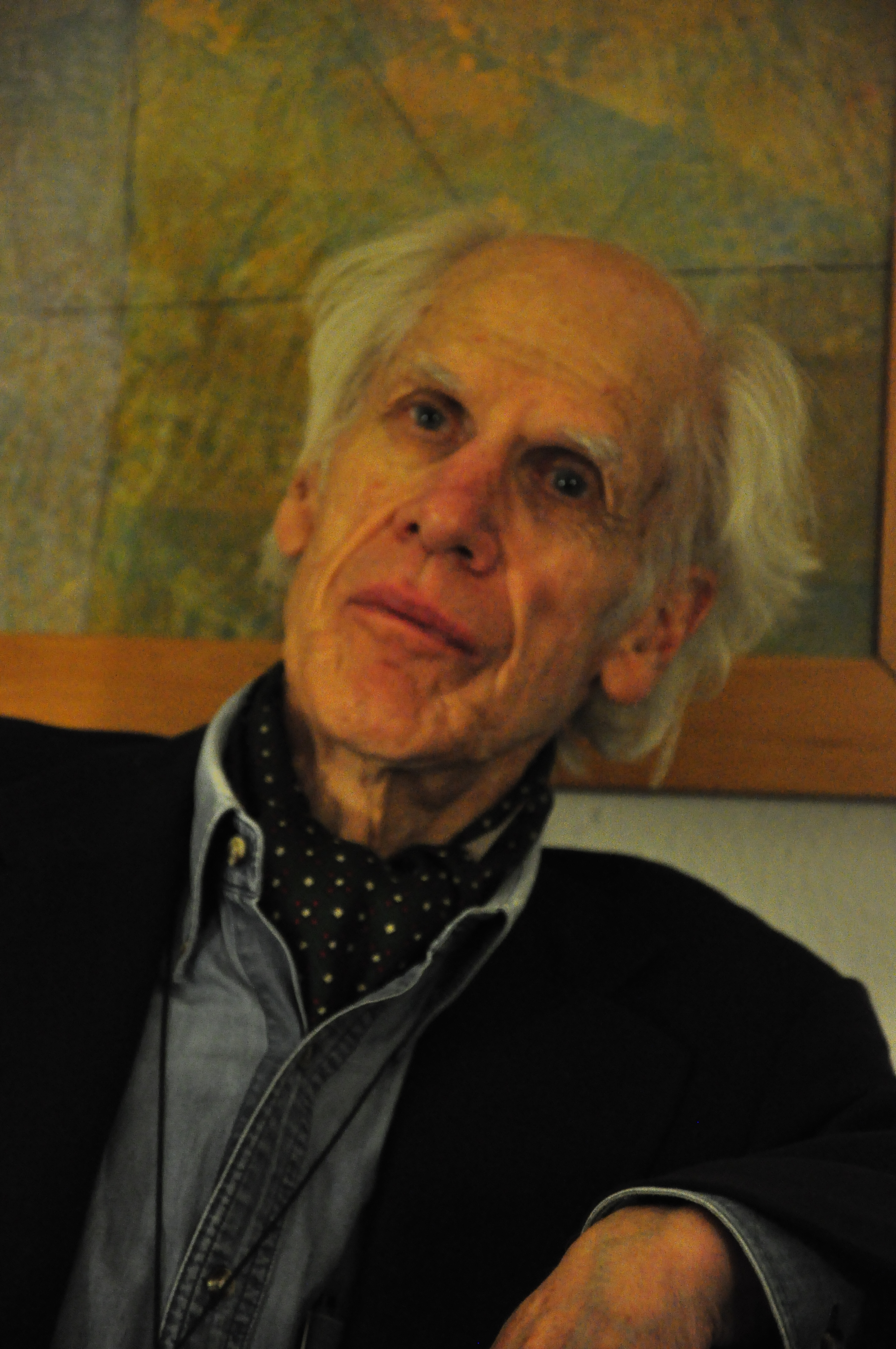
Sir James McNeish

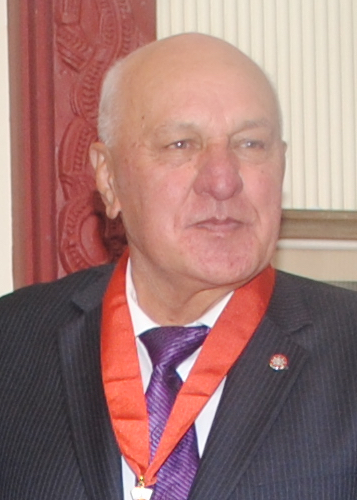
Sir Tamati Reedy

=== Companion (CNZM) ===
- Peter George Bush QSM – of Wellington. For services to photography.
- Janet Mary Clews QSO – of Auckland. For services to local-body affairs and the community.
- Letitia June Clifford QSM – of Napier. For services to music and the community.
- Yvette Winifred Corlett MBE – of Auckland. For services to athletics.
- Miriam Rose Dean QC – of Auckland. For services to the law and business.
- Christine Mary Fernyhough ONZM – of Castle Hill. For services to the community.
- David John Hay JP – of Auckland. For services to local-body affairs and the community.
- Ricki Lloyd Herbert – of Wellington. For services to football.
- Professor Emeritus Roy Patrick Kerr – of Christchurch. For services to astrophysics.
- Johannes La Grouw – of Rotorua. For services to business and the community.
- Dr Semisi Ma'ia'i QSM – of Wellington. For services to the Samoan community.
- Murray Allan Sherwin – of Wellington. For services as chief executive of the Ministry of Agriculture and Forestry.
- Professor Ian James Warrington – of Palmerston North. For services to science.
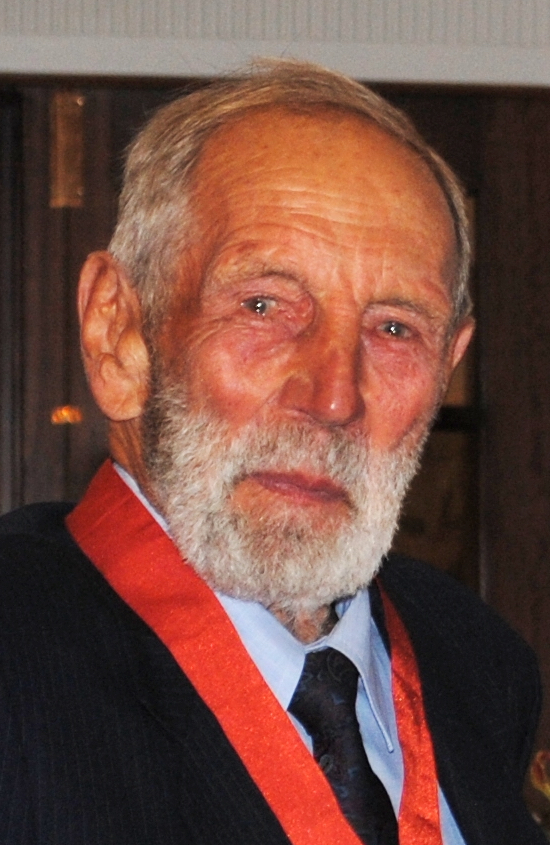
Peter Bush

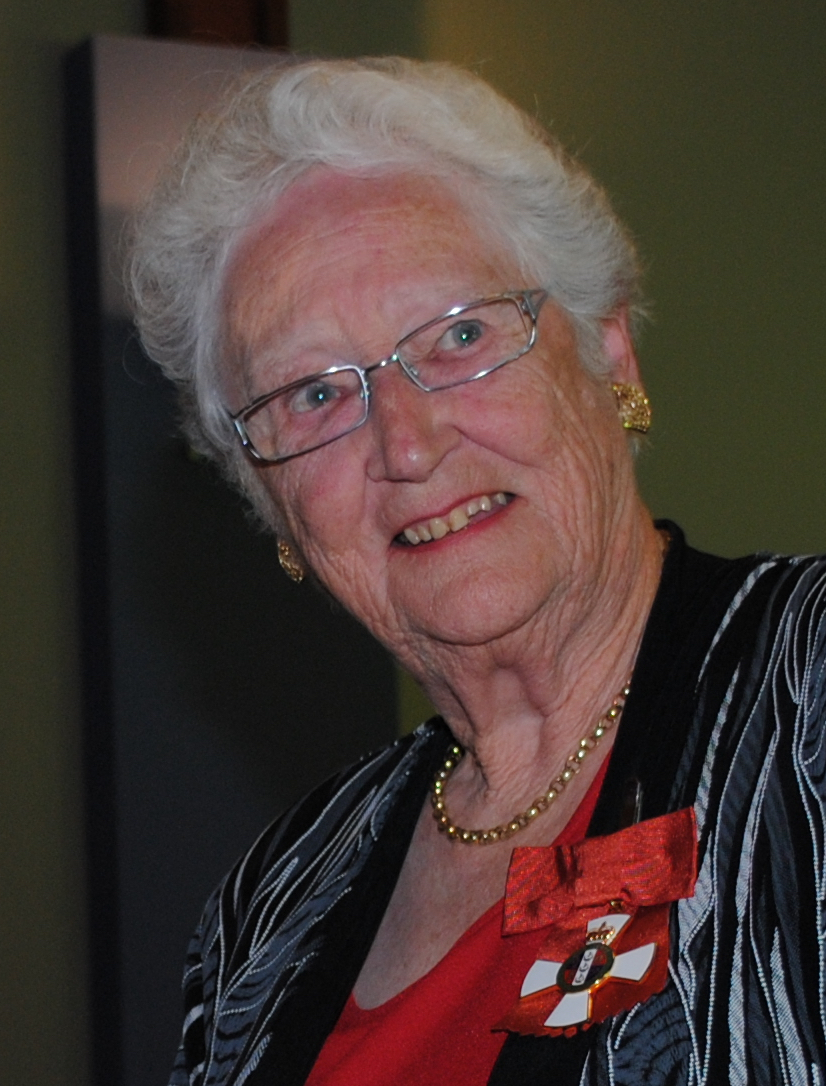
Janet Clews

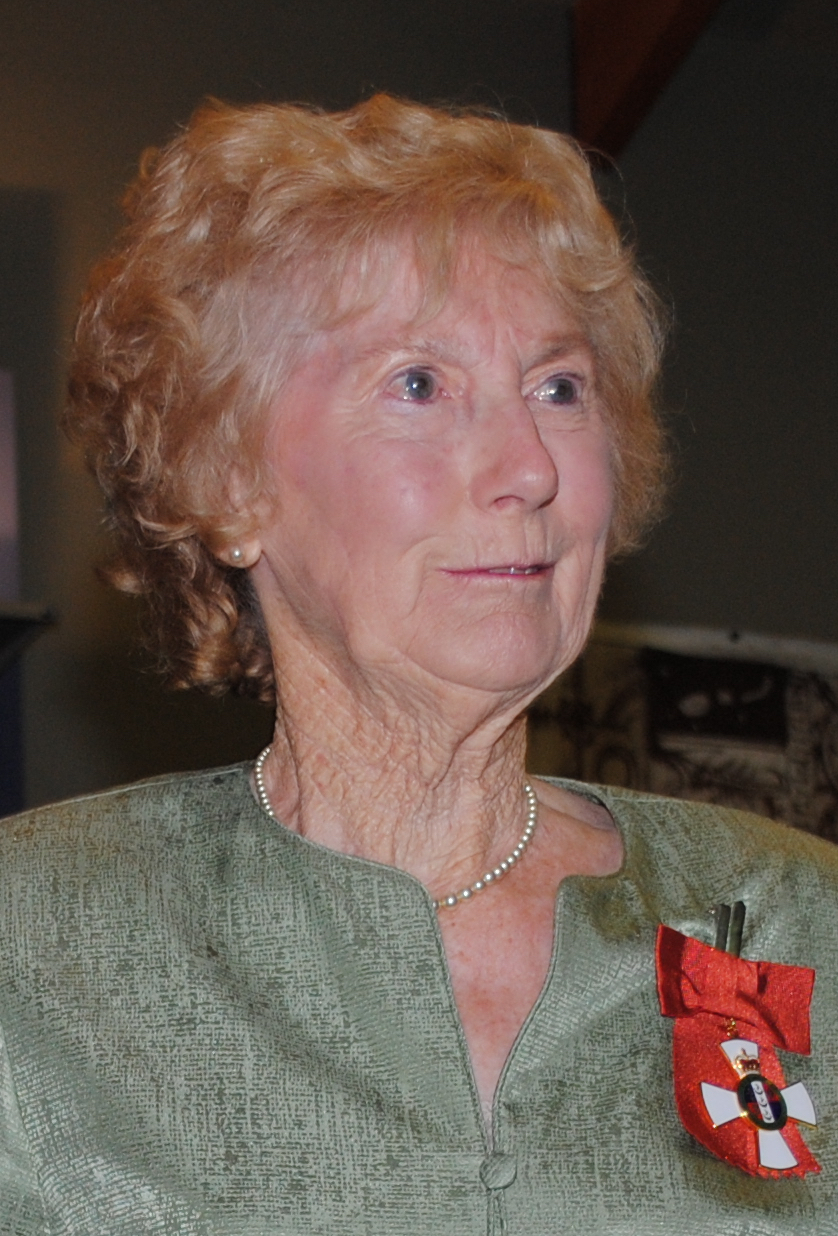
Yvette Corlett

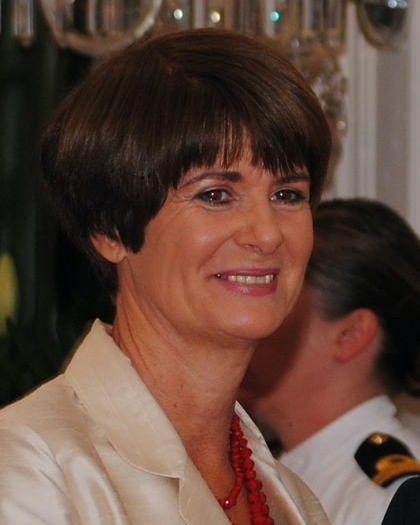
Miriam Dean

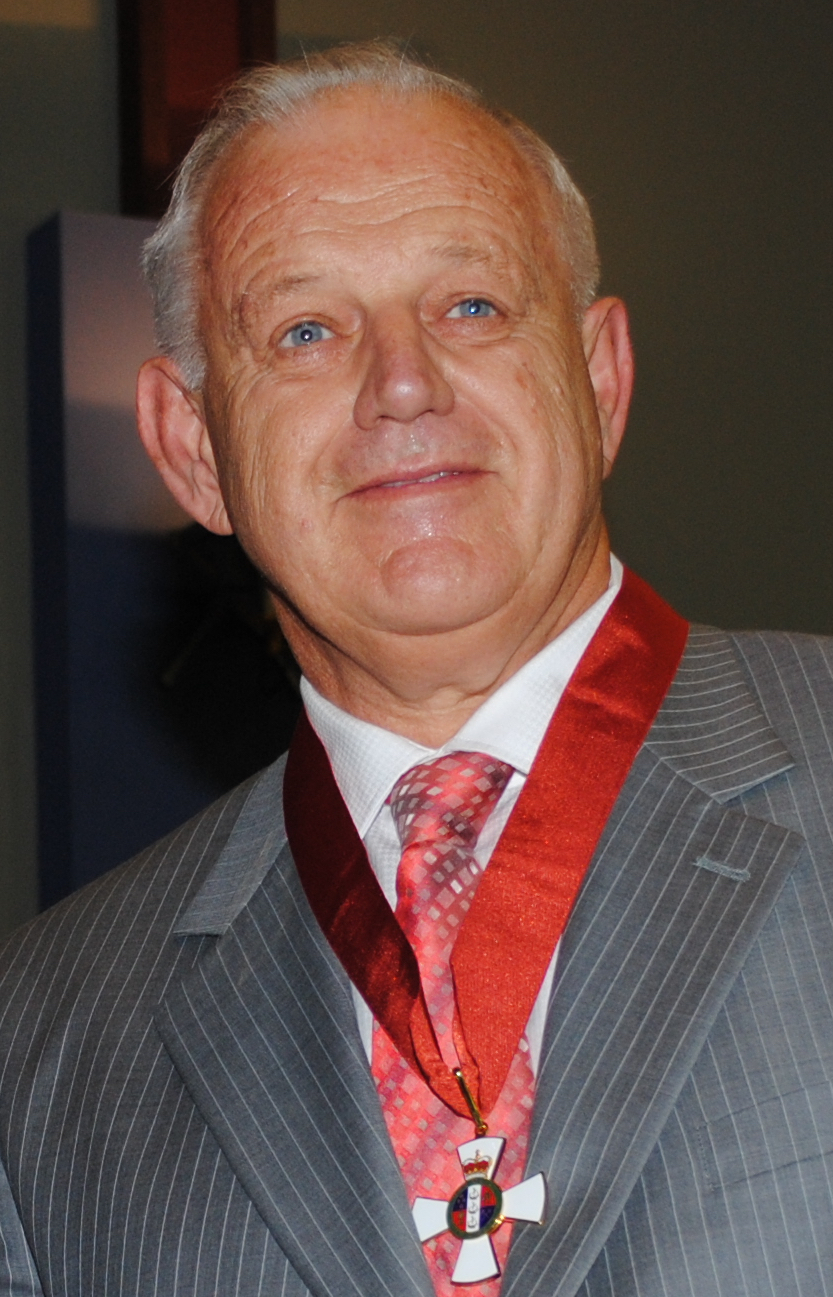
David Hay

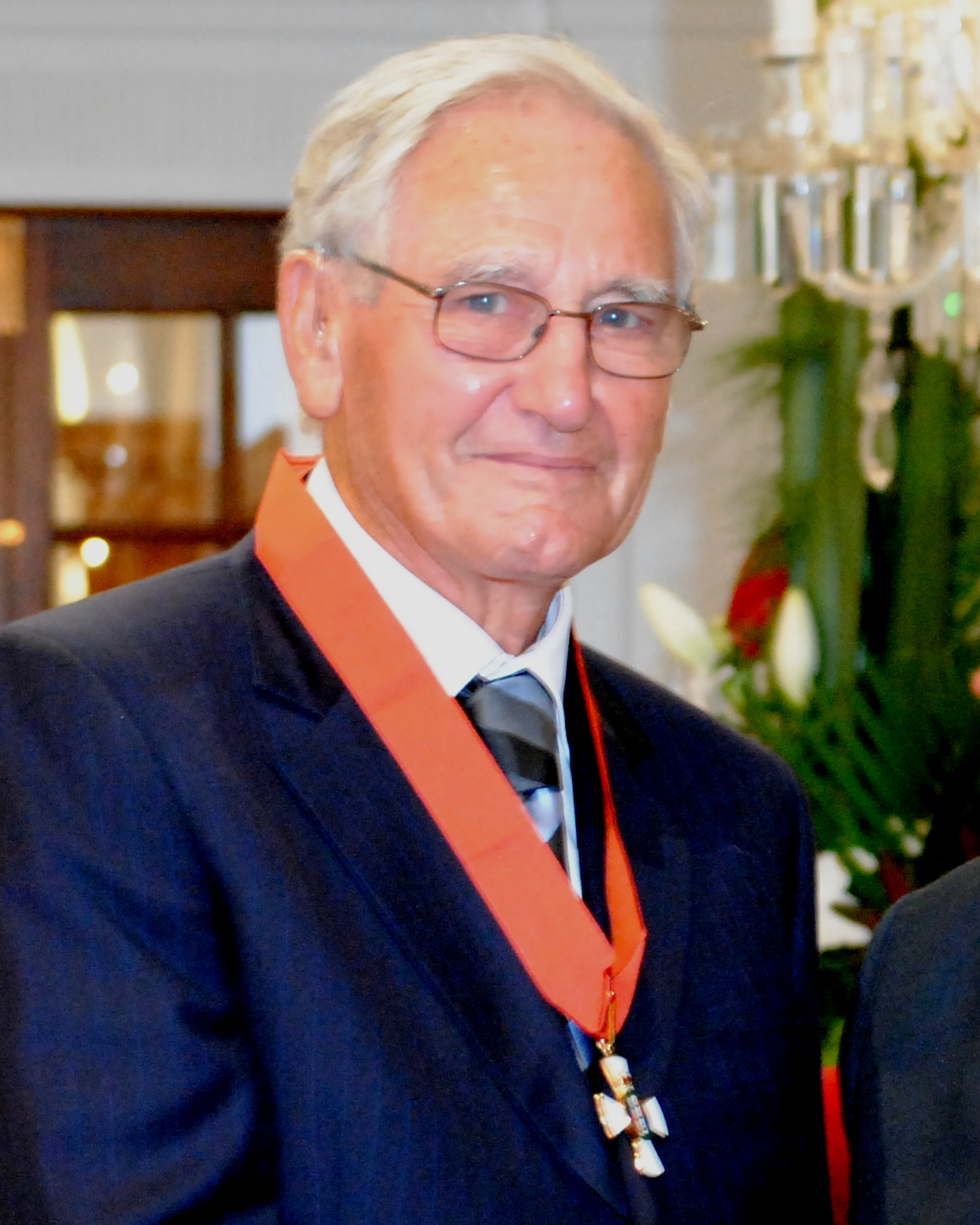
Roy Kerr

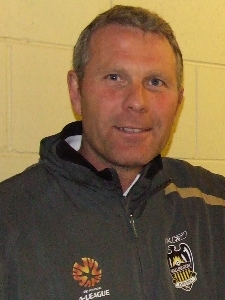
Ricki Herbert

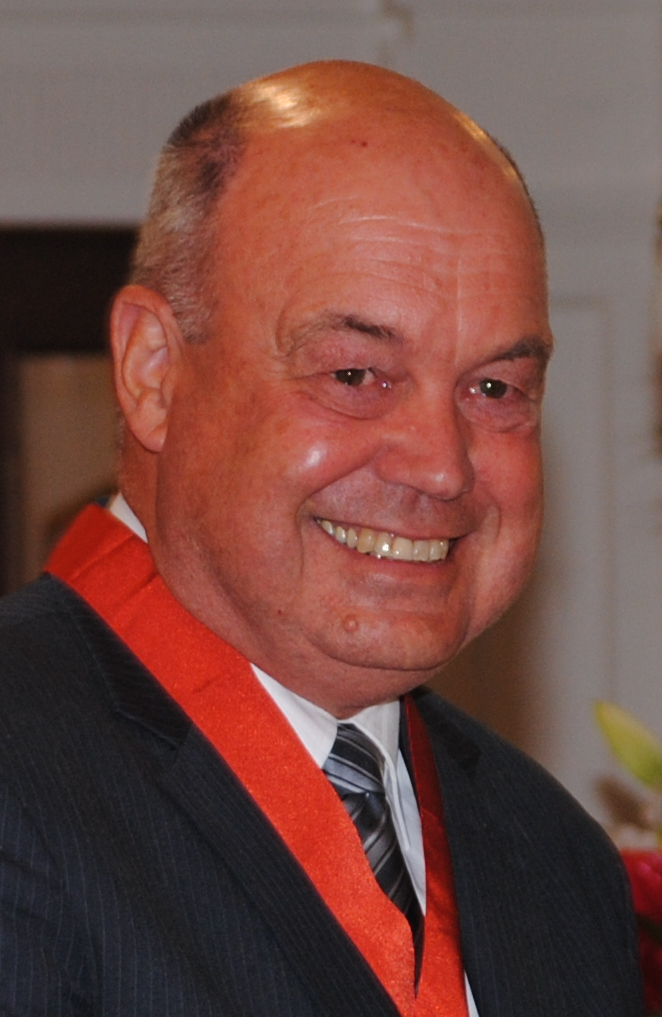
Ian Warrington

=== Officer (ONZM) ===
- Derek Andrew Anderson – of Christchurch. For services to the community.
- Michael Francis Barnett – of Auckland. For services to business.
- Dr Warren Johnston Bell – of Auckland. For services to forensic science.
- Nicolas Calavrias – of Wellington. For services to business.
- Andrew Forbes Davidson – of Christchurch. For services to the timber industry.
- Dr Barbara Lynn Disley – of Auckland. For services to health.
- Peter James Egan – of Hamilton. For services to the meat industry.
- Brian Francis Evans – of Auckland. For services to women's rugby.
- Professor Lewis Tudor Evans – of Porirua. For services to education.
- Rangimarie Naida Glavish JP – of Auckland. For services to Māori and the community.
- Thomas David Henshaw – of Hamilton. For services as a cartoonist.
- John William Holdsworth – of Wellington. For services to business and the community.
- Paul Anthony Honiss – of Hamilton. For services to the community.
- Phillip John Leishman – of Auckland. For services to media and the community.
- Richard Arthur Long – of Wellington. For services to journalism.
- David William Mace – of Auckland. For services to the community.
- Dr Keith Ian Desmond Maslen – of Dunedin. For services to literature and bibliography.
- Professor Lesley Margaret Elizabeth McCowan – of Auckland. For services to health.
- Professor Samuel Stuart McNaughton – of Auckland. For services to education.
- Ryan Nelsen – of Cheshire, United Kingdom . For services to football.
- Associate Professor John Andrew Ormiston – of Auckland. For services to medicine.
- Vicki Suzanne Reid – of Nelson. For services to the community.
- Jeanette Robyn Richardson – of Opua. For services to the community.
- The Honourable Roger Morrison Sowry – of Paraparaumu. For services as a Member of Parliament.
- William Paul Studholme JP – of Banks Peninsula. For services to forestry and the community.
- Associate Professor Jean-Claude Theis – of Dunedin. For services to medicine.
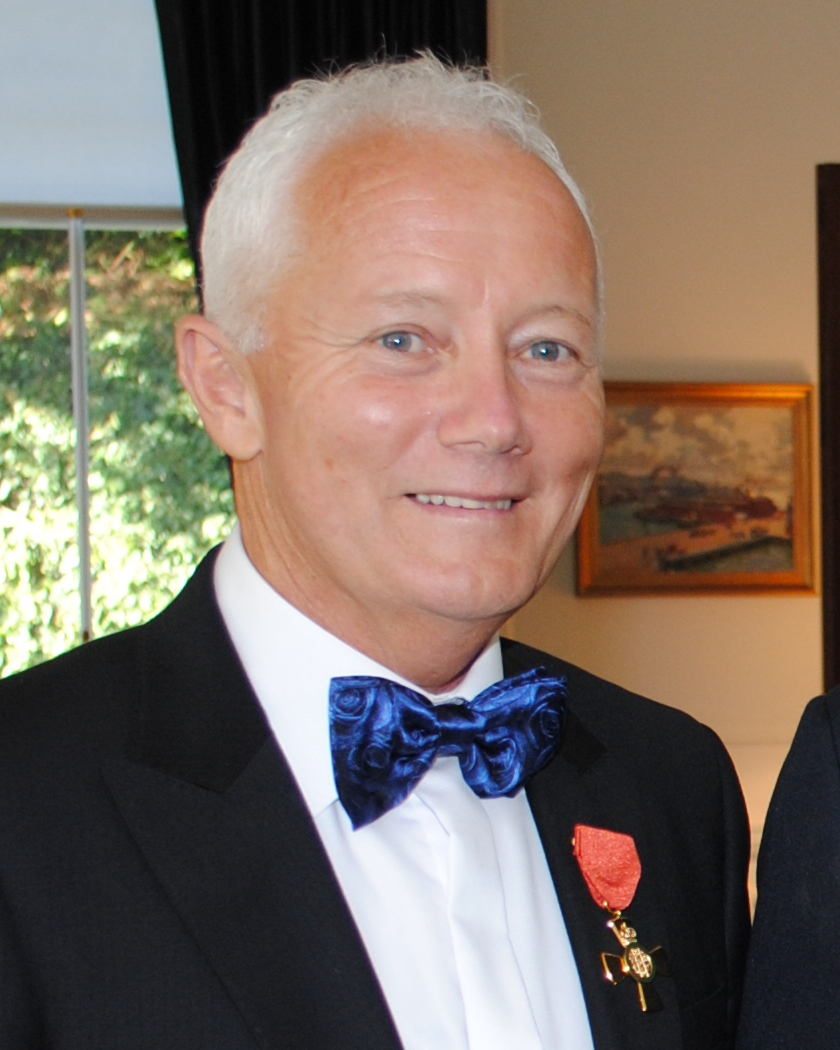
Michael Barnett

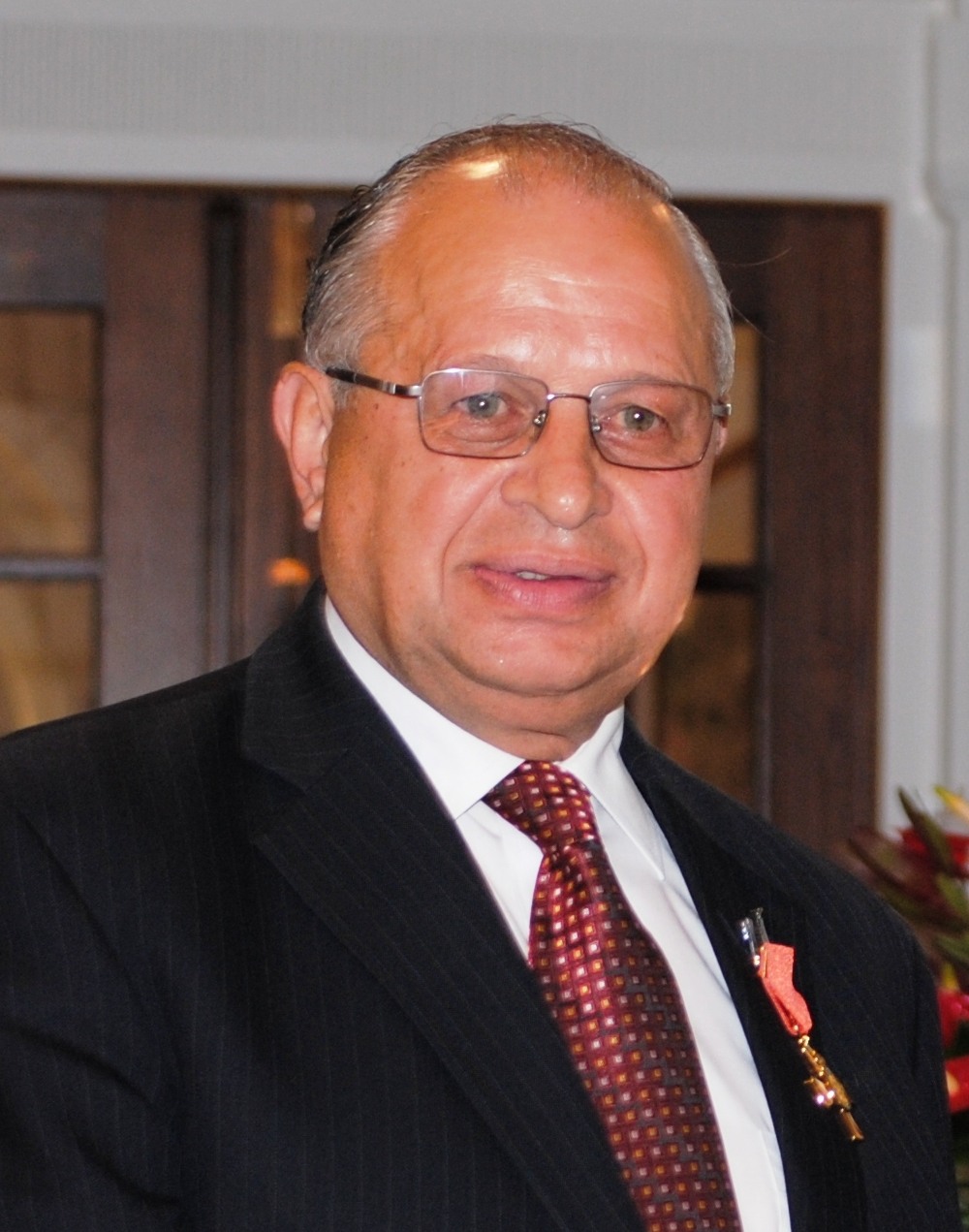
Nick Calavrias

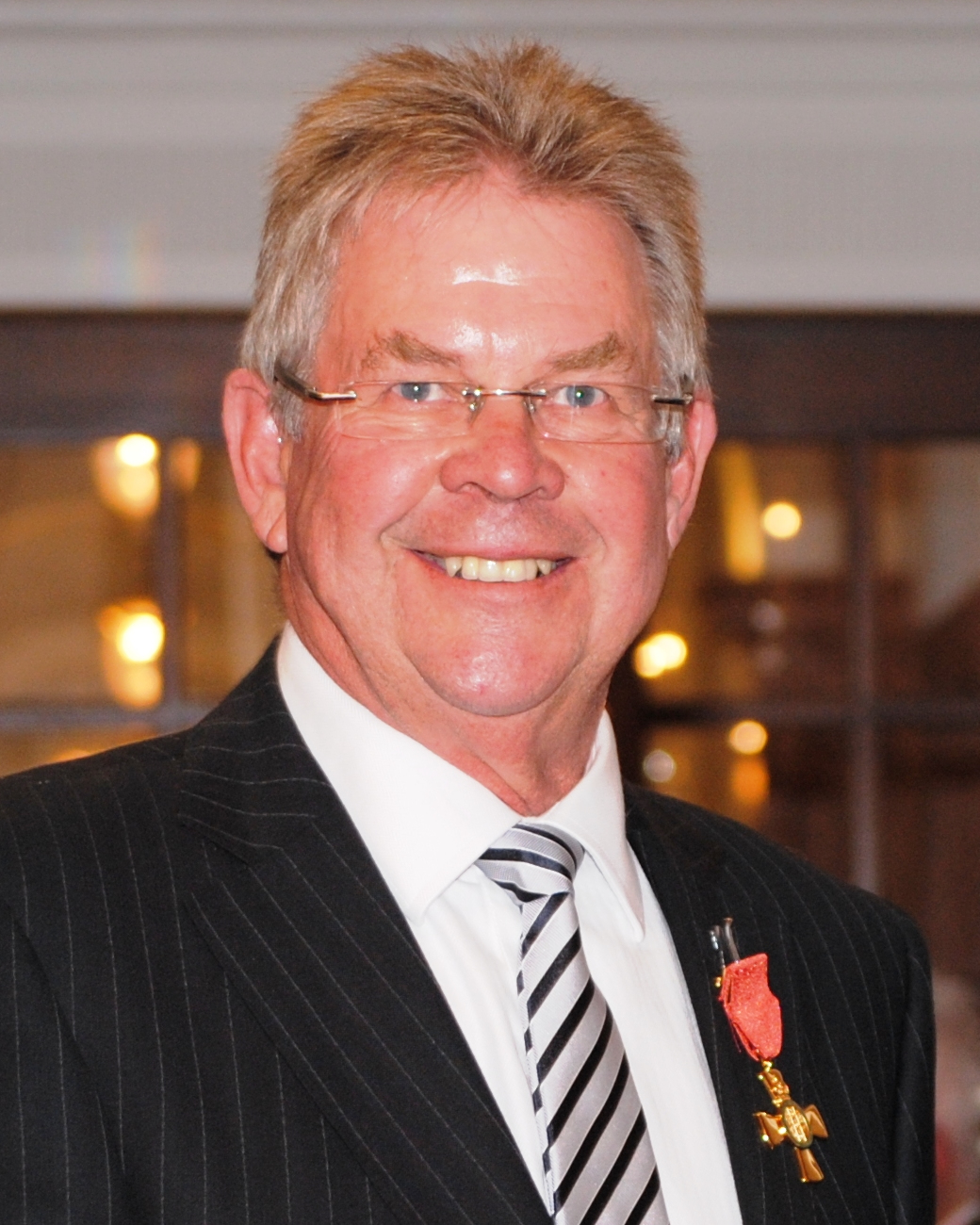
Andrew Davidson

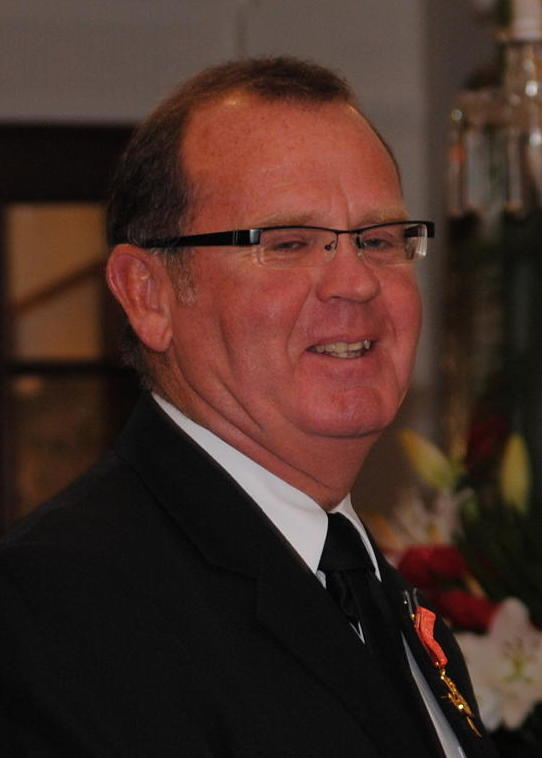
Brian Evans

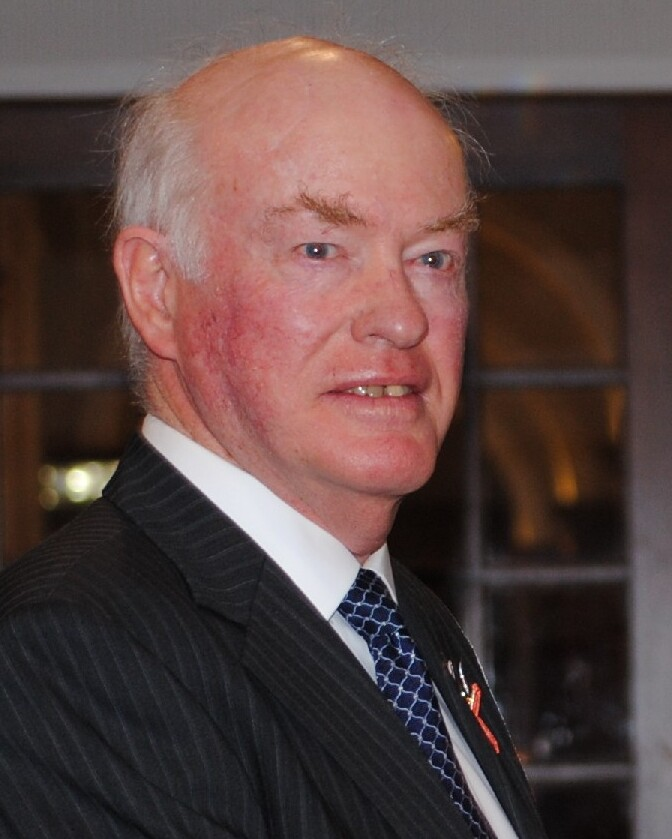
Lew Evans

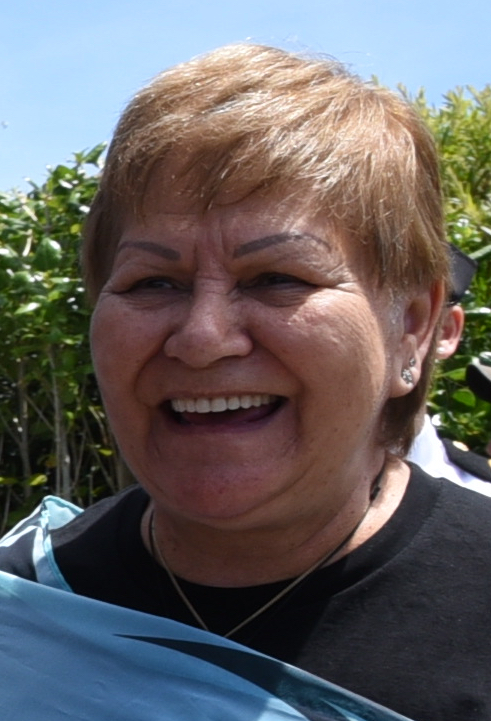
Naida Glavish

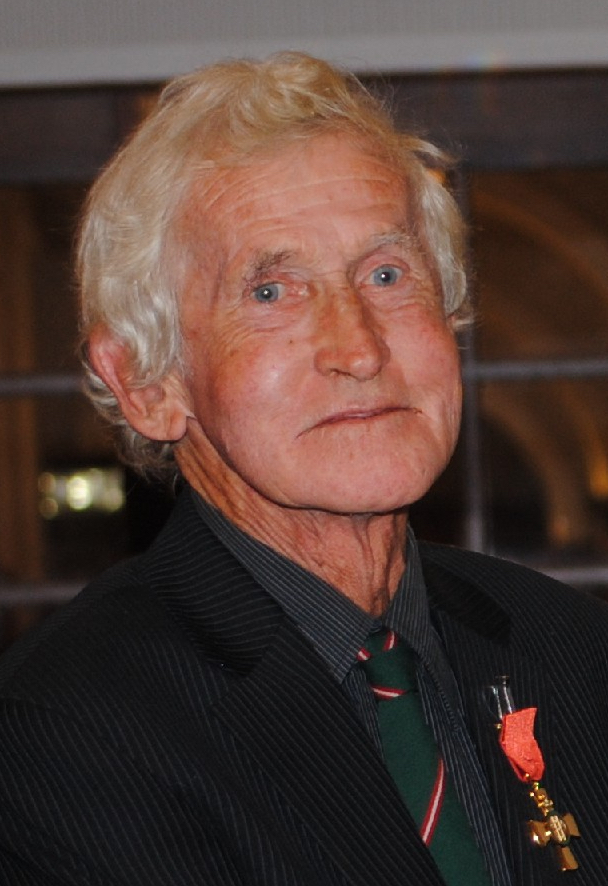
David Henshaw

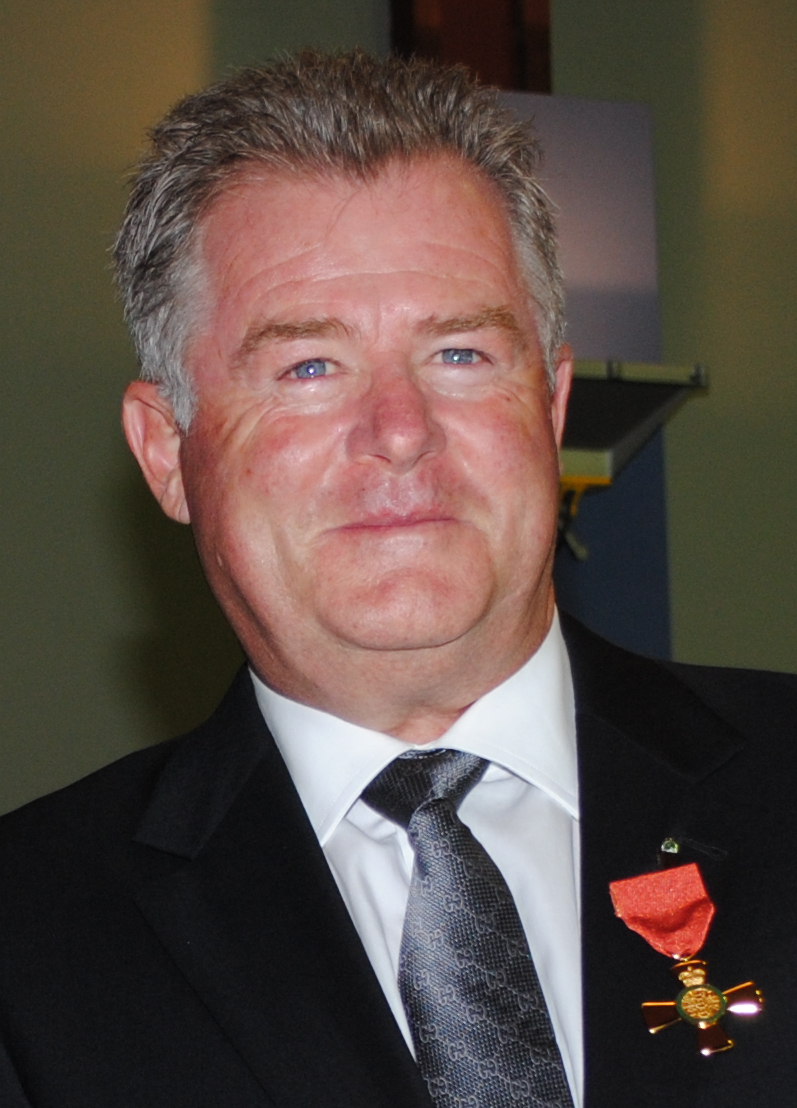
Phillip Leishman

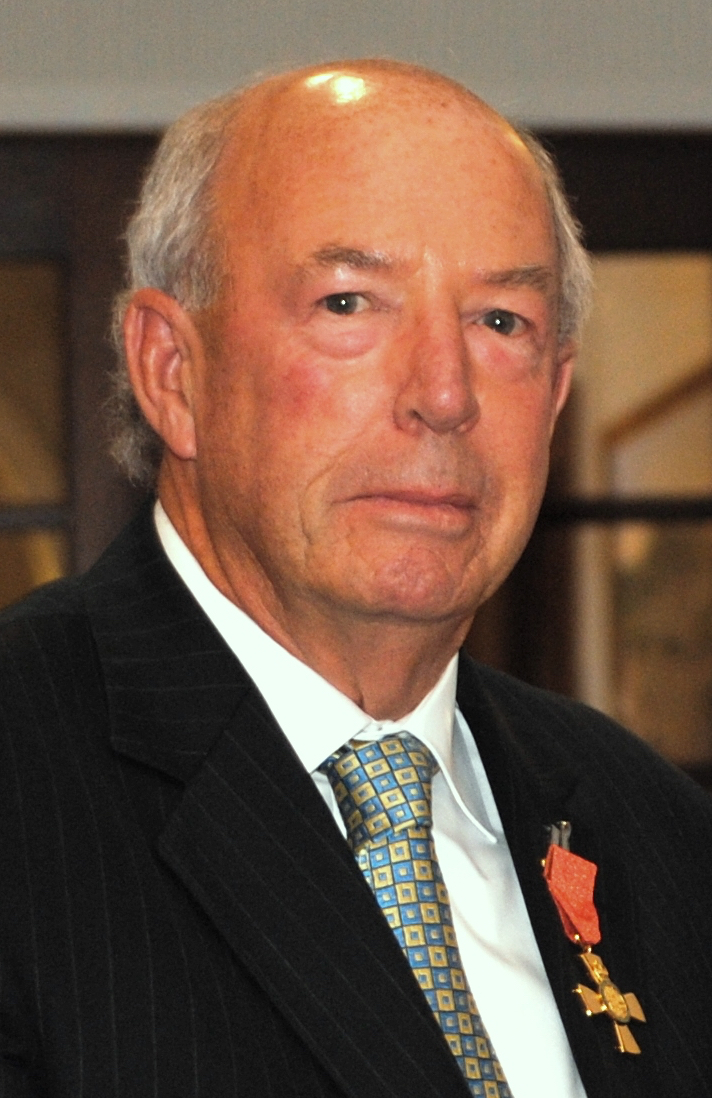
Richard Long

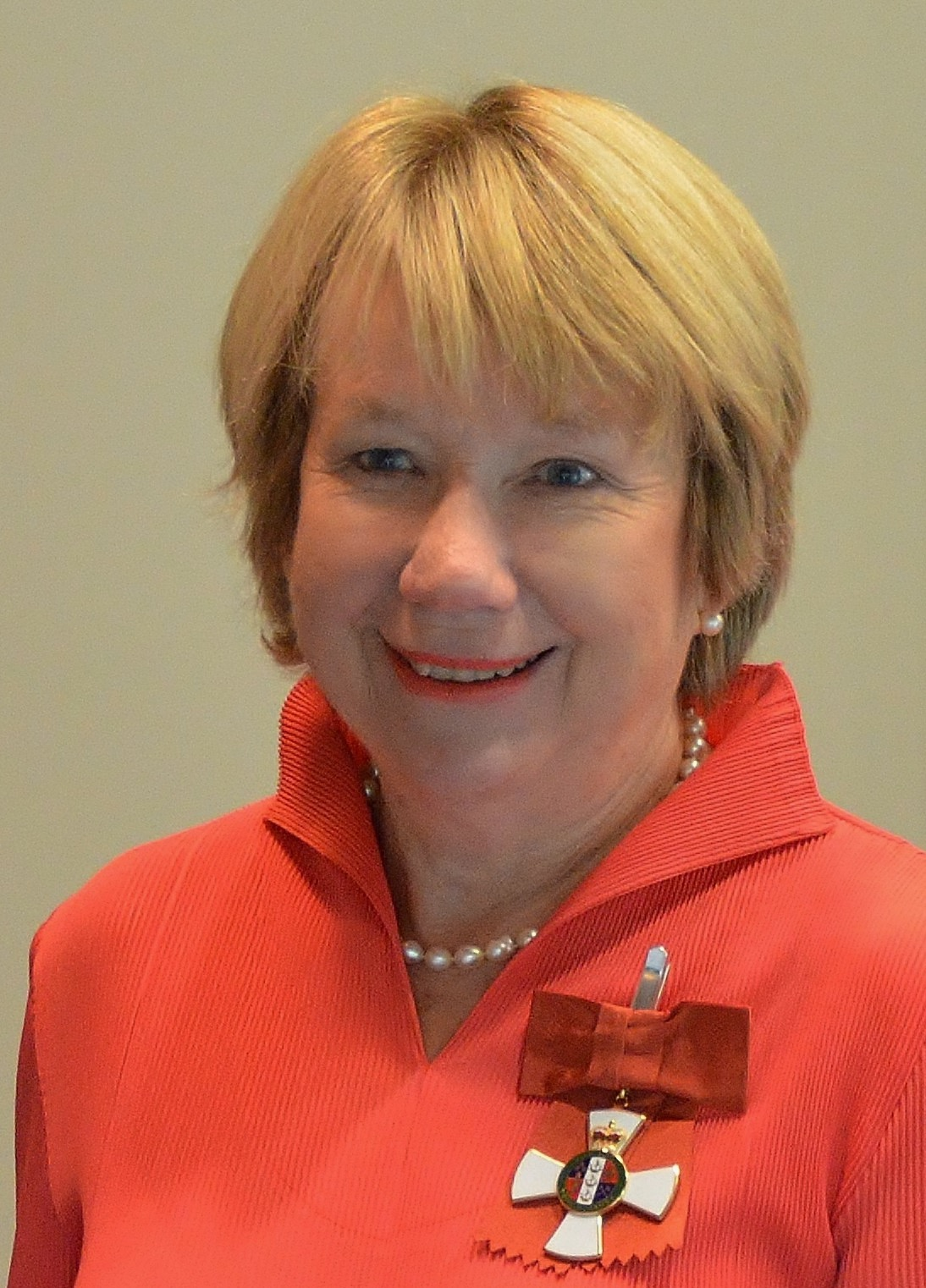
Lesley McCowan

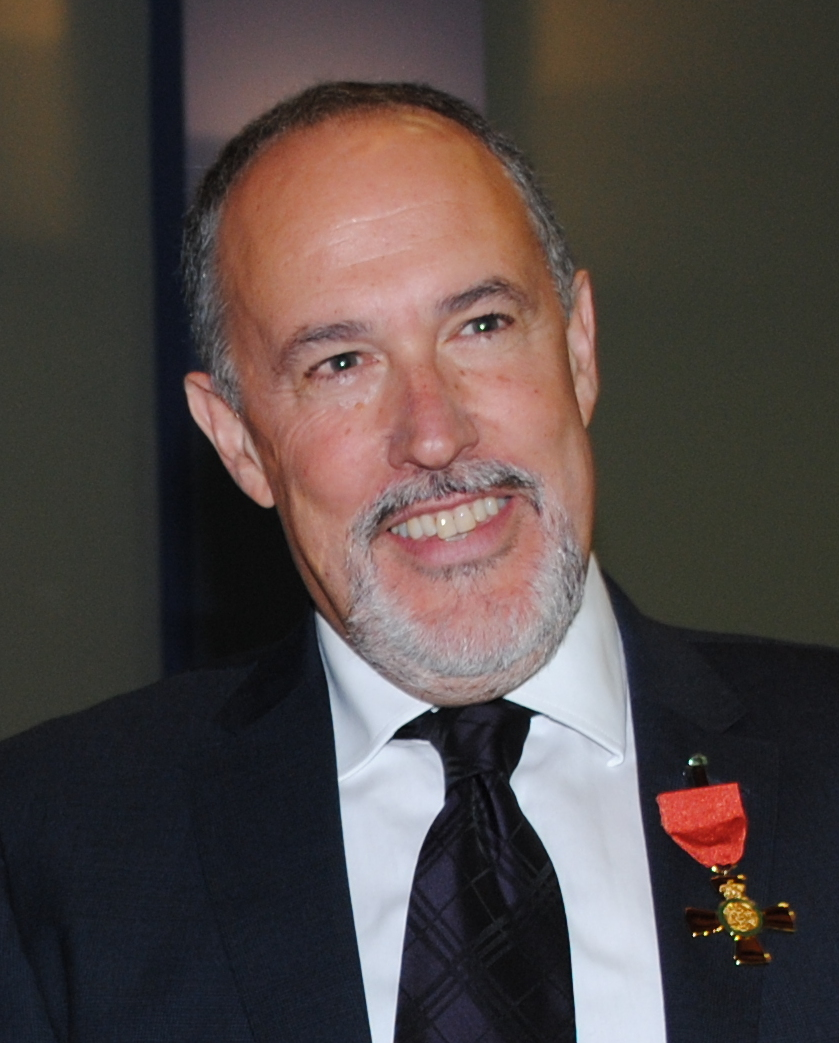
Stuart McNaughton

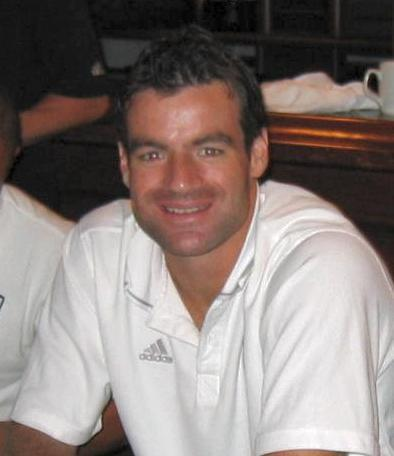
Ryan Nelsen

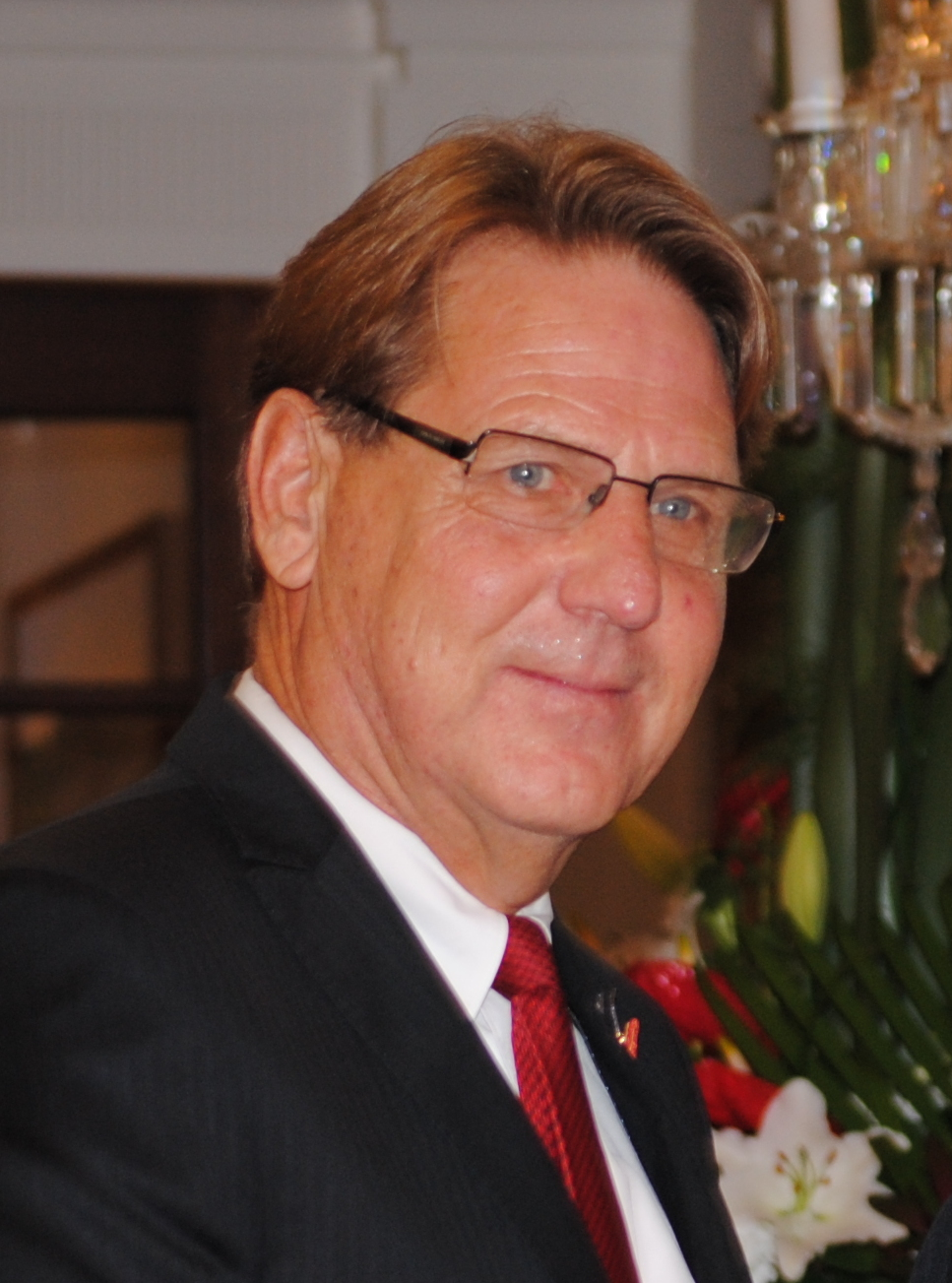
John Ormiston

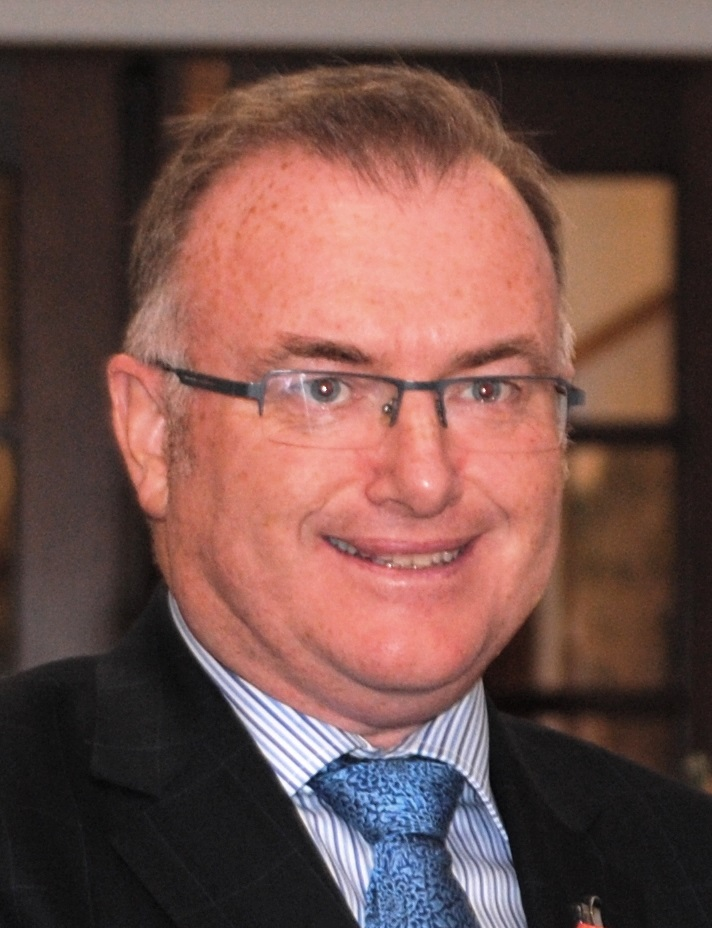
Roger Sowry

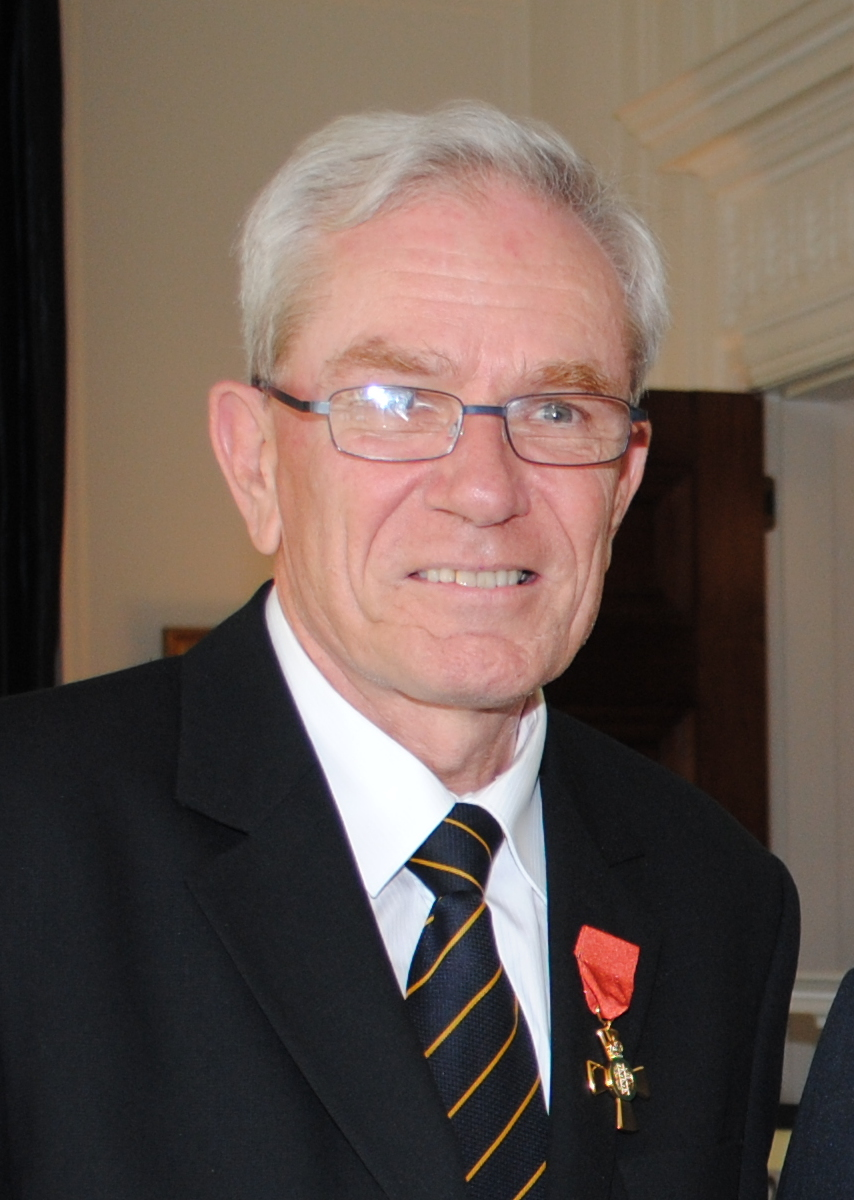
Jean-Claude Theis

=== Member (MNZM) ===
- Robert Harold Briant – of Gisborne. For services to the community.
- Alison Ann Broad QSM – of Invercargill. For services to the community.
- Lindsay John Brown – of Dunedin. For services to the community.
- Jens Bukholt QSM – of Wanganui. For services to the community.
- Karen Margrethe Bukholt QSM – of Wanganui. For services to the community.
- Elisabeth Phyllis June Burgess – of Auckland. For services to women's health.
- James John Campbell – of Auckland. For services to surf life saving.
- Bernard Albert Roy Card – of Porirua. For services to agriculture.
- Dr John Manley Carter – of Wellington. For services to medicine.
- Marion Dorothy Cooper QSM – of Lower Hutt. For services to Te Omanga Hospice.
- Dr Edward John Gane – of Auckland. For services to medicine.
- Garth Edward George – of Rotorua. For services to journalism.
- Maurice Giovanni Gianotti – of Taupō. For services to education and the community.
- William Frank Guest – of Wellington. For services to the performing arts.
- Ewa Katete Haua – of Auckland. For services to Māori.
- Thomas William Johnson – of Napier. For services to rugby.
- Alexa Mary Johnston – of Auckland. For services to the arts.
- Lorraine Kerr – of Tūrangi. For services to education.
- Shelley Celia Kitchen – of Auckland. For services to sport.
- Connie Fay Ling Kum – of Auckland. For services to the Chinese community.
- Scott Laurenson – of Paraparaumu. For services to wrestling.
- Anthony George Lewis – of Christchurch. For services to music.
- John Roderick McKenzie – of Christchurch. For services to agriculture.
- Kitty-Anne Joy McKinley – of Wellington. For services to youth and the community.
- David Wyndham Meares – of Greta Valley. For services to agriculture.
- Wayne Fortune Mills – of Auckland. For services to education.
- Richard John Nanson – of Wellington. For services to horticulture.
- Robert Arthur Neale – of Palmerston North. For services to education and the community.
- Donald Owen Neely MBE – of Wellington. For services to cricket.
- Fiona Campbell Pearson – of Wellington. For services to the Cancer Society.
- Garry Alan Pedersen – of Auckland. For services to motorsport.
- Steven John Price – of Auckland. For services to rugby league.
- Shaun Cameron Quincey – of Auckland. For services to solo long-distance rowing.
- Roger Girling Rose JP – of Blenheim. For services to the community.
- Melissa Jane Ruscoe – of Christchurch. For services to women's rugby.
- Colin Francis Smith – of Gore. For services to business.
- Brendan Michael Smyth – of Wellington. For services to the music industry.
- Neil William Sole JP – of Katikati. For services to the community.
- John Ernest Edward Southerwood – of Napier. For services to Māori.
- Graham Charles Stewart – of Wellington. For services to historical research and photography.
- John Benjamin Sutherland JP – of Christchurch. For services to philanthropy.
- Roy Bruce Tankersley – of Palmerston North. For services to music.
- Dr Rex William Thomson – of Dunedin. For services to education and sport.
- Haidee Maree Tiffen – of Christchurch. For services to women's cricket.
- Errol Brian Velvin – of New Plymouth. For services to surf life saving.
- James Terence Wakelin – of Auckland. For services to surf life saving.
- Muriel Pimia Wehi QSM – of Auckland. For services to Māori.
- Kok Kit Wong – of Auckland. For services to business and the community.
- John Liddell Wylie – of Christchurch. For services to rowing.
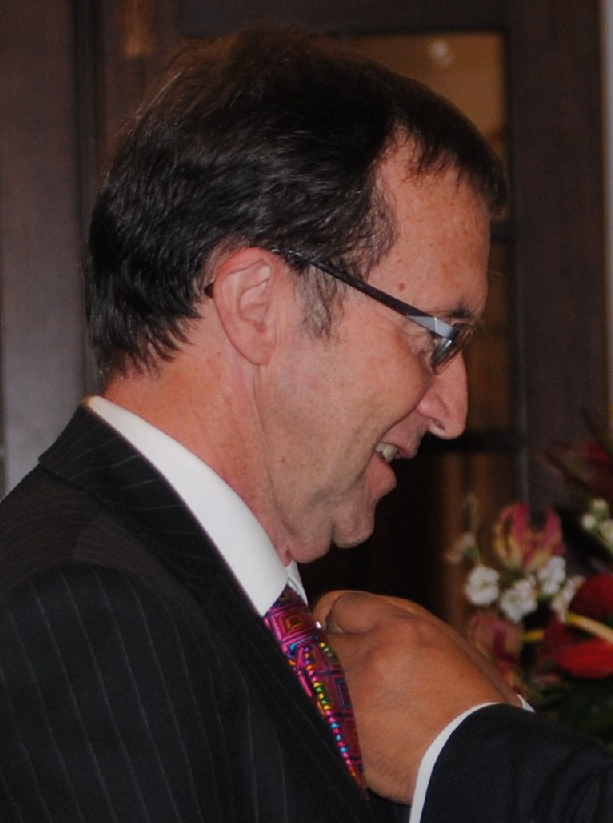
Lindsay Brown

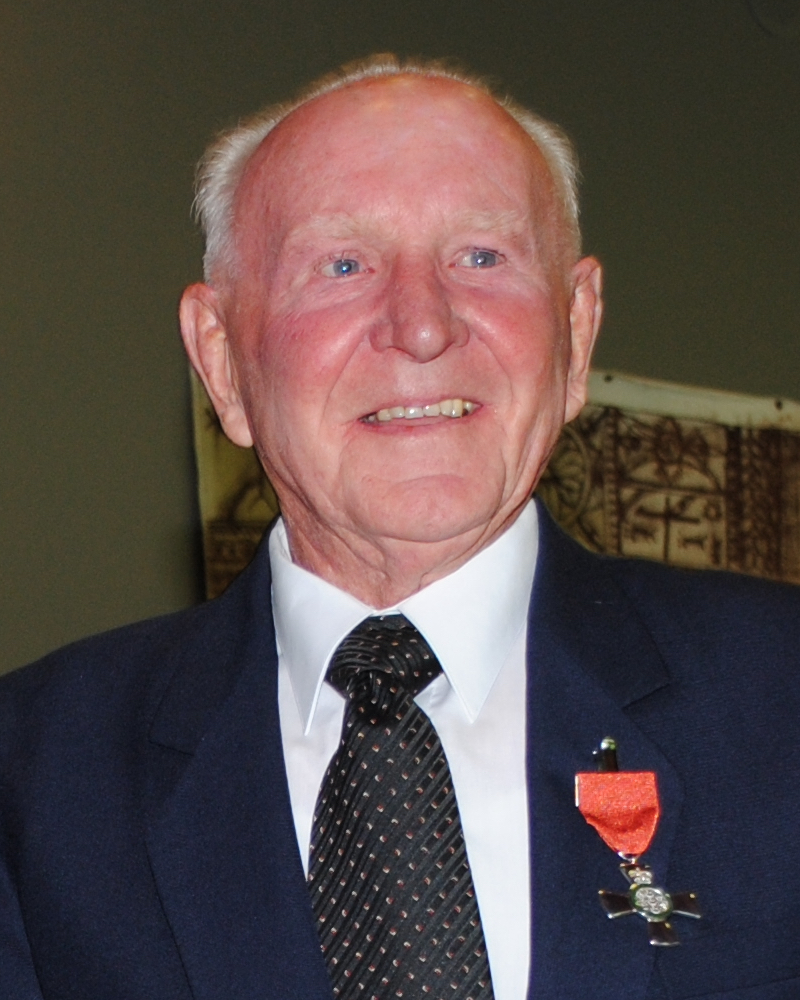
Jim Campbell

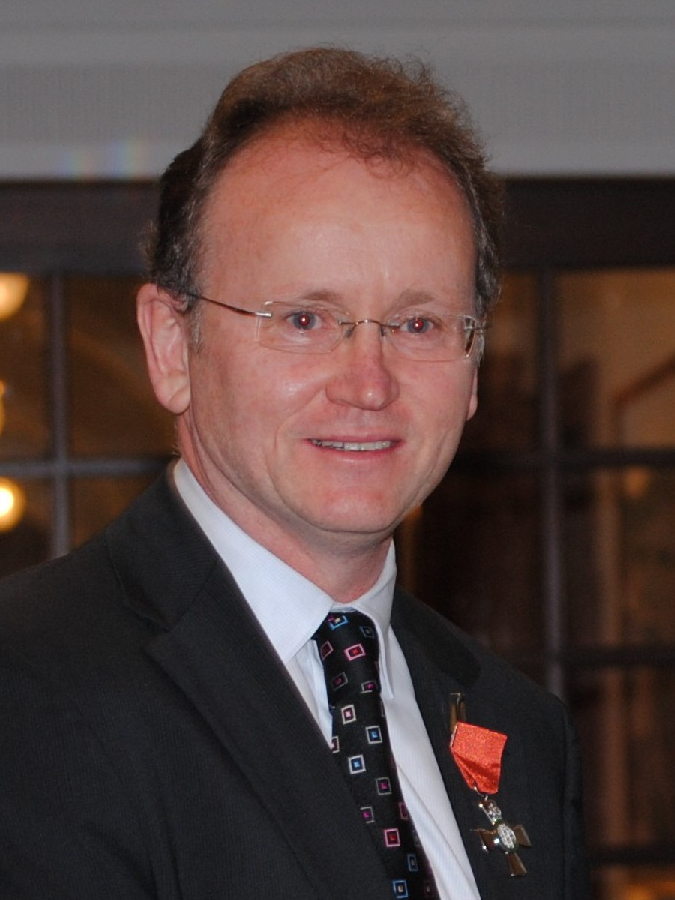
Ed Gane

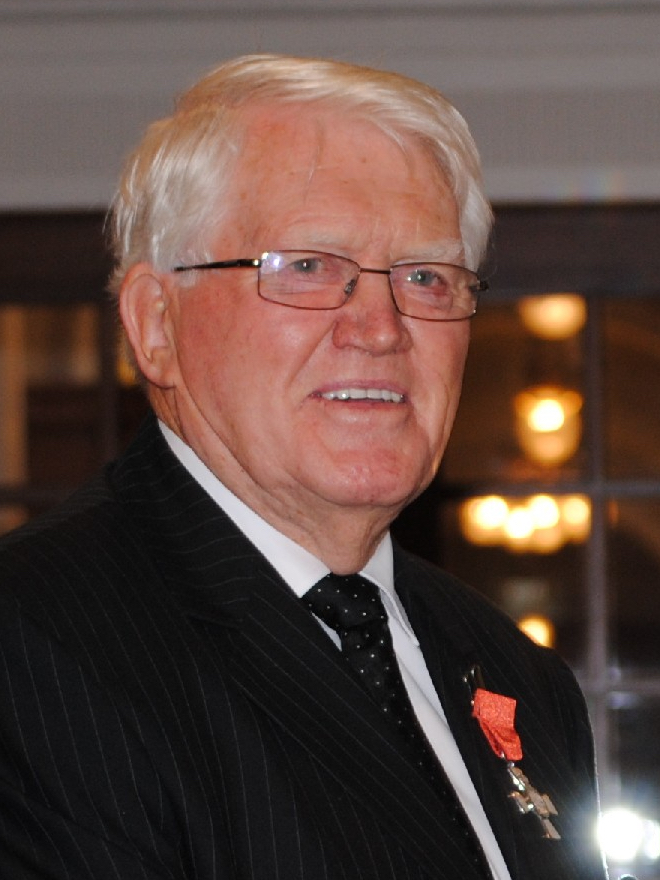
Tom Johnson

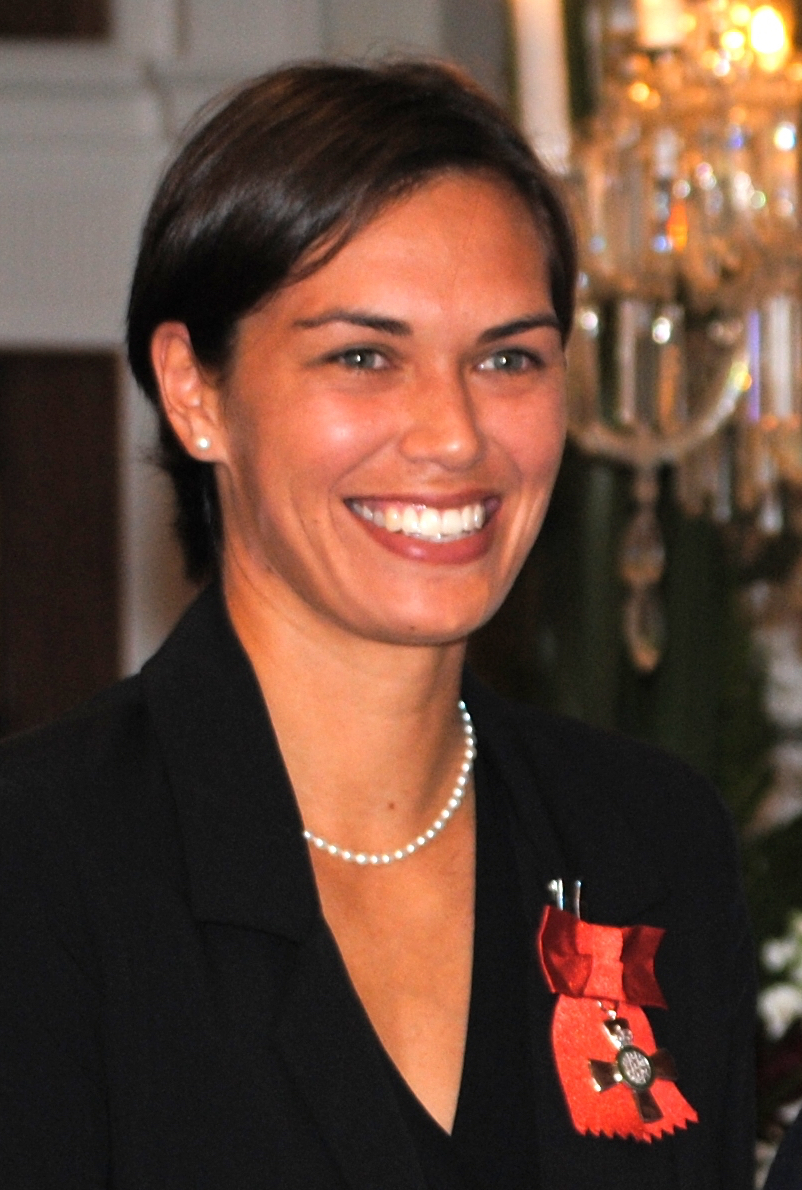
Shelley Kitchen

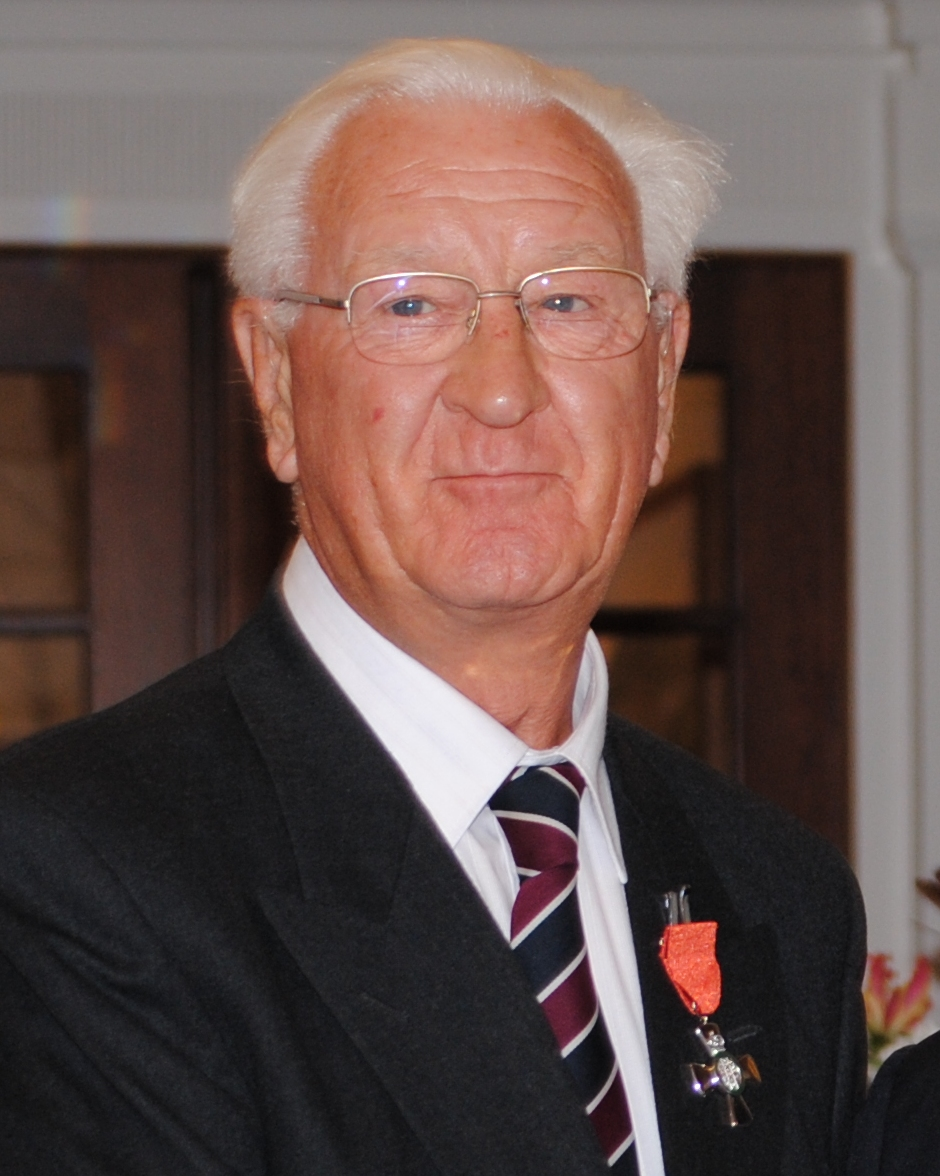
Robert Neale

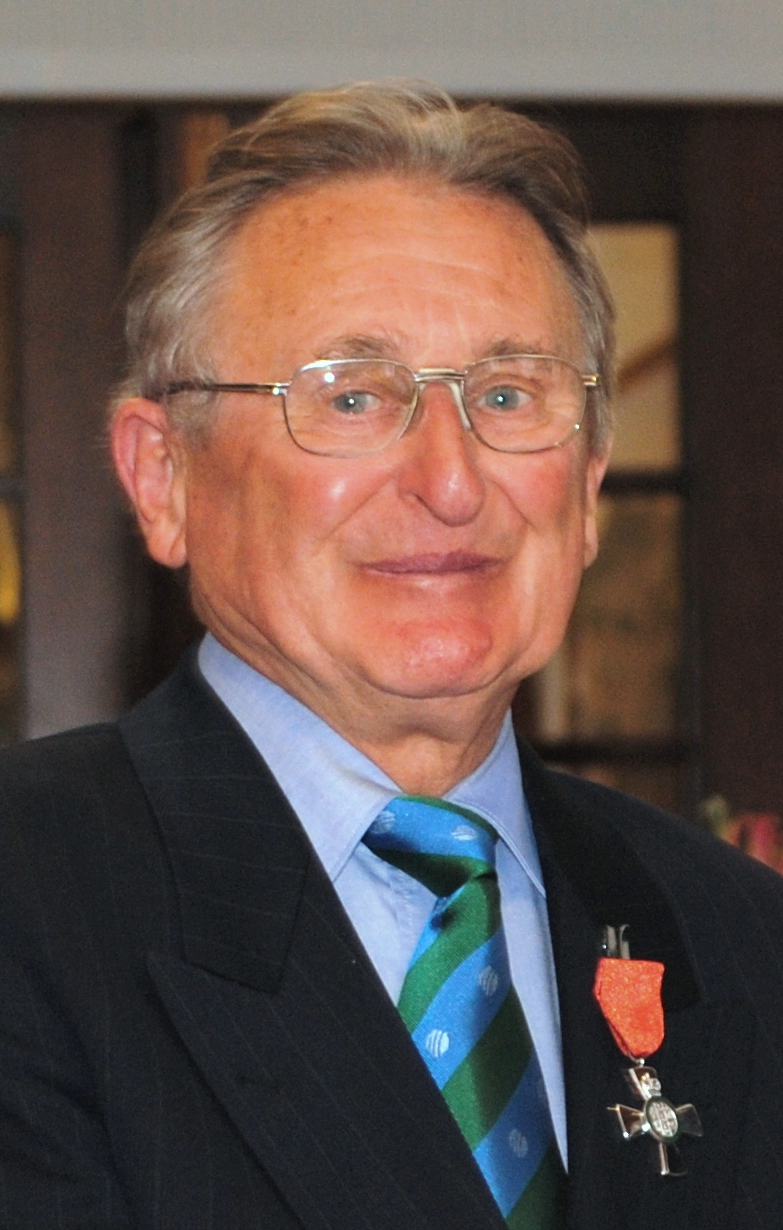
Don Neely

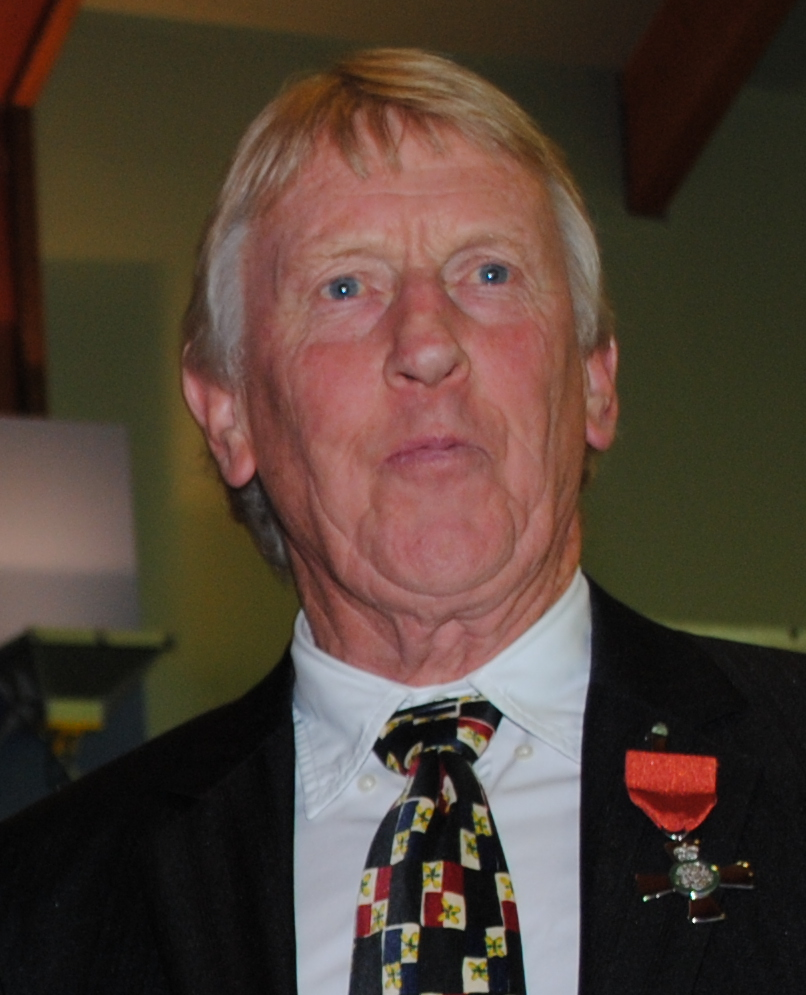
Garry Pedersen

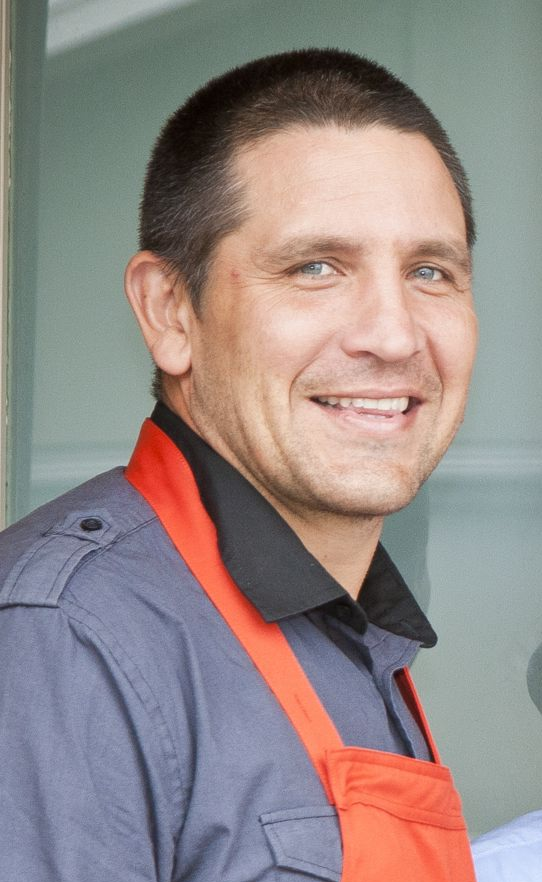
Steve Price

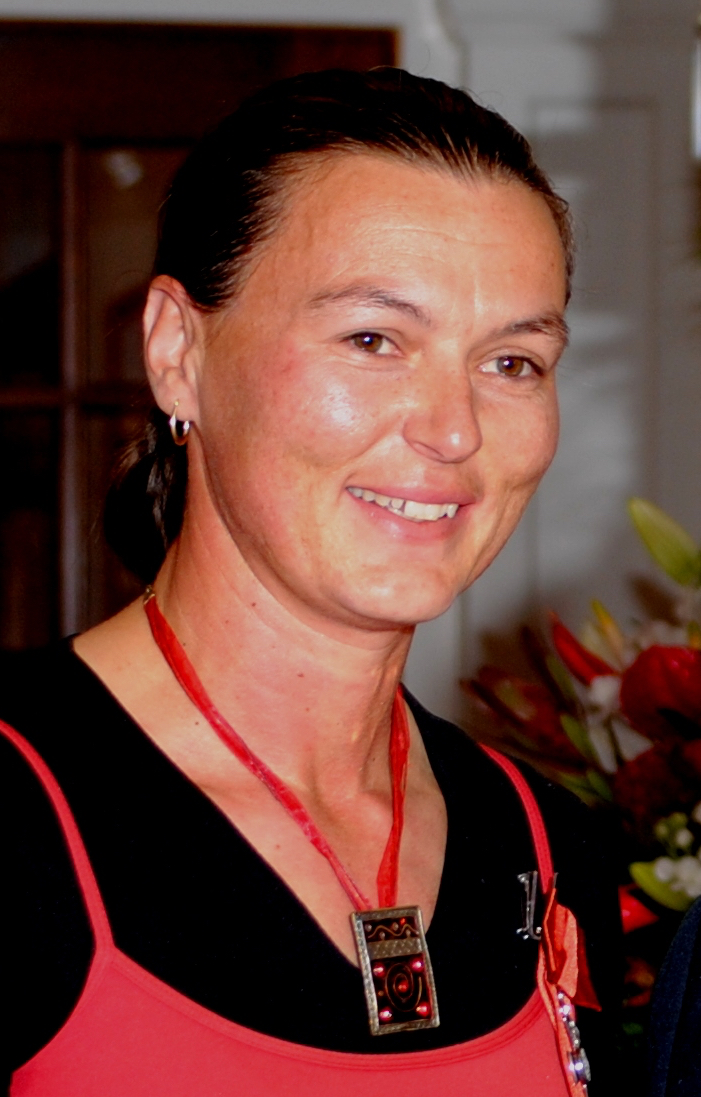
Melissa Ruscoe

Haidee Tiffen

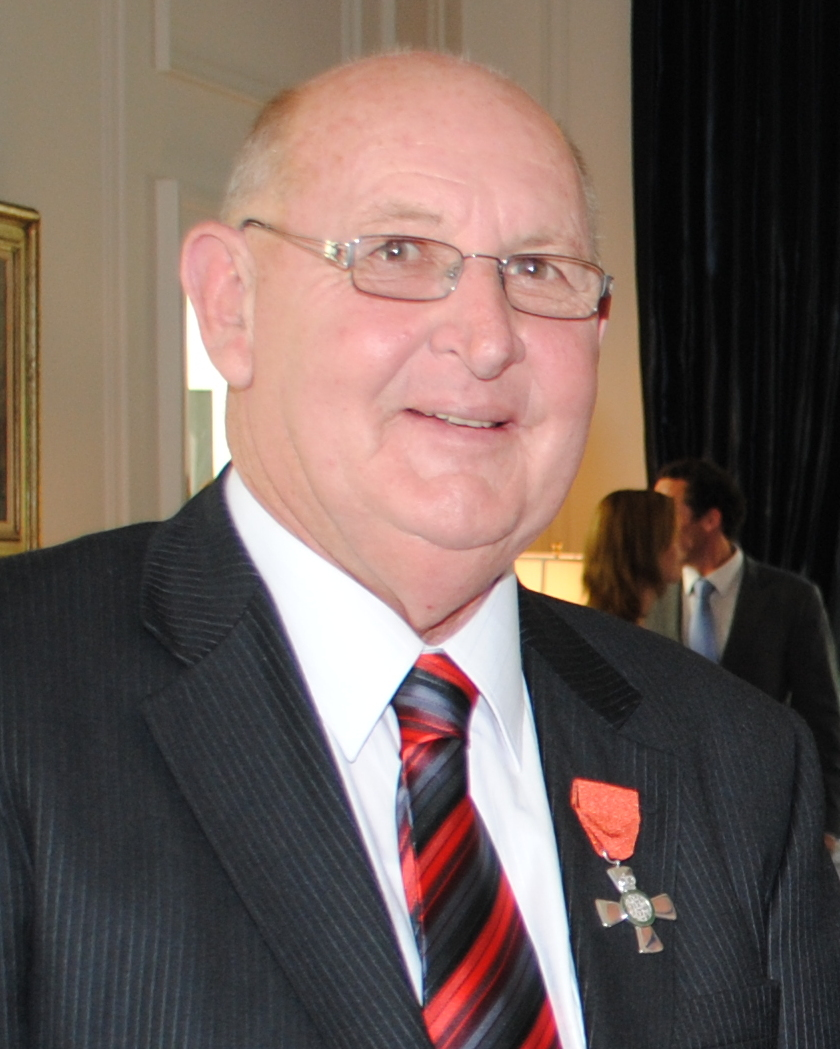
John Wylie

== Companion of the Queen's Service Order (QSO) ==
- Jennifer Sylvia Brash – of Porirua. For services to local-body affairs.
- Clive Raymond Geddes – of Queenstown. For services to local-body affairs.
- The Honourable Winifred Alexandra Laban (Luamanuvao Laban) – of Porirua. For services as a Member of Parliament.
- Robert Bruce Pulman QSM – of Auckland. For services to the community.
- Maureen Ellen Reynolds – of Dannevirke. For services to local-body affairs.
- Betty Leuina Sio – of Auckland. For services to the Pacific Island community. (Note: Appointment cancelled and annulled, 28 May 2025.)
- Peter David Tennent – of New Plymouth. For services to local-body affairs.
- Dr Joseph Williams QSM – of Auckland. For services to the Cook Islands community.
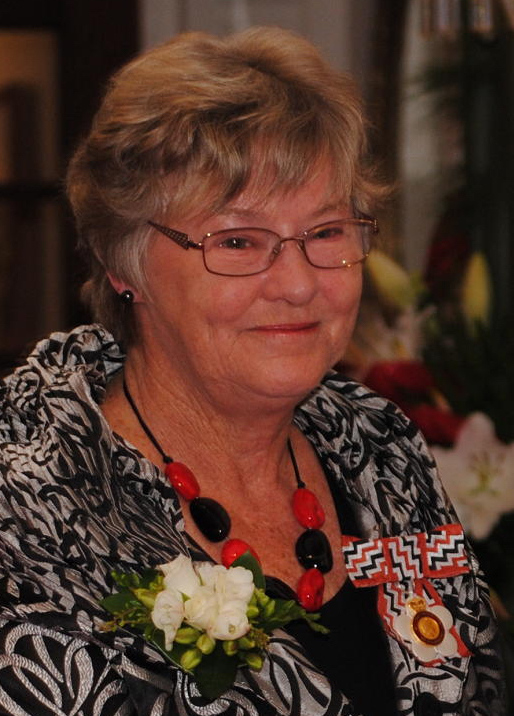
Jenny Brash

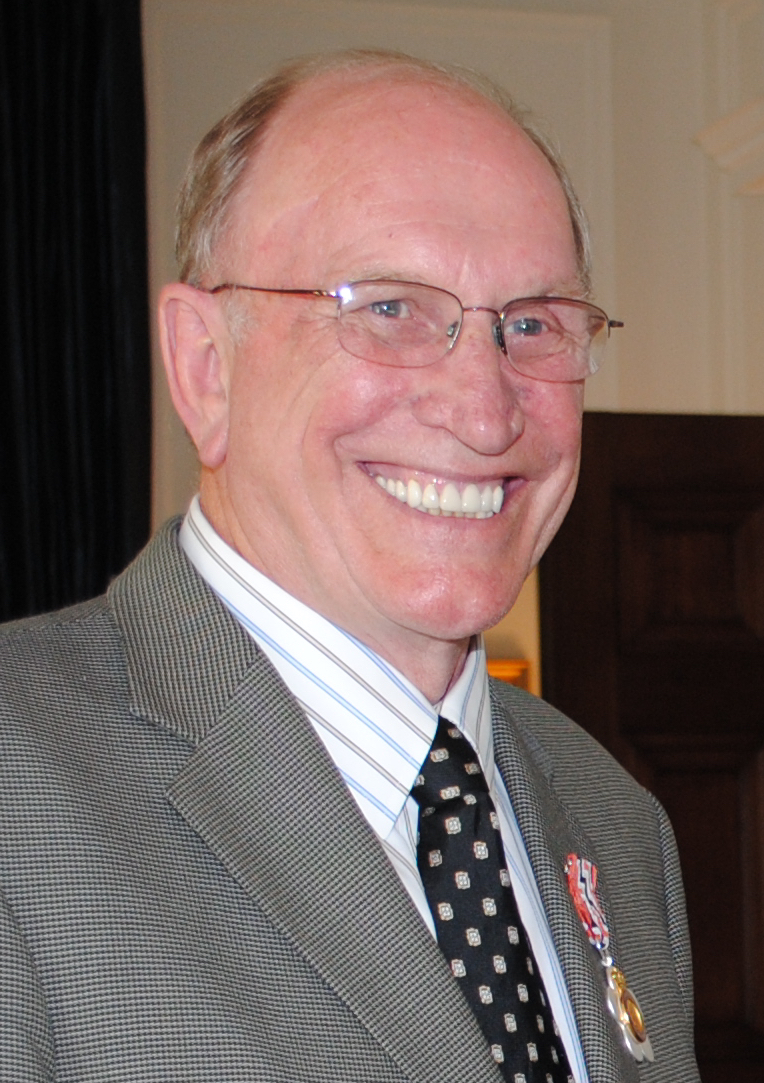
Clive Geddes

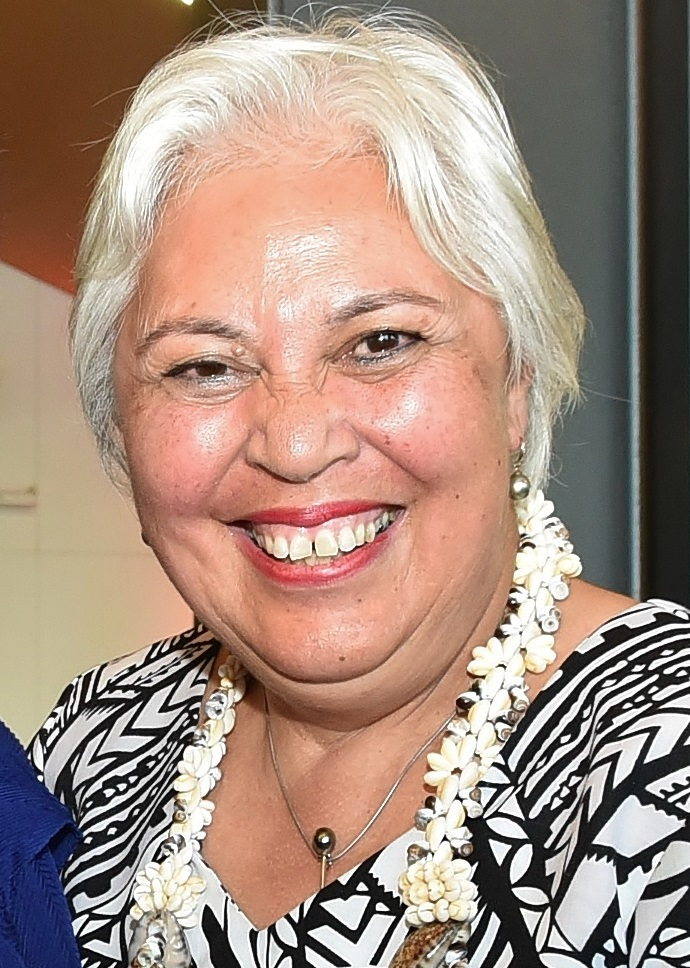
Winnie Laban

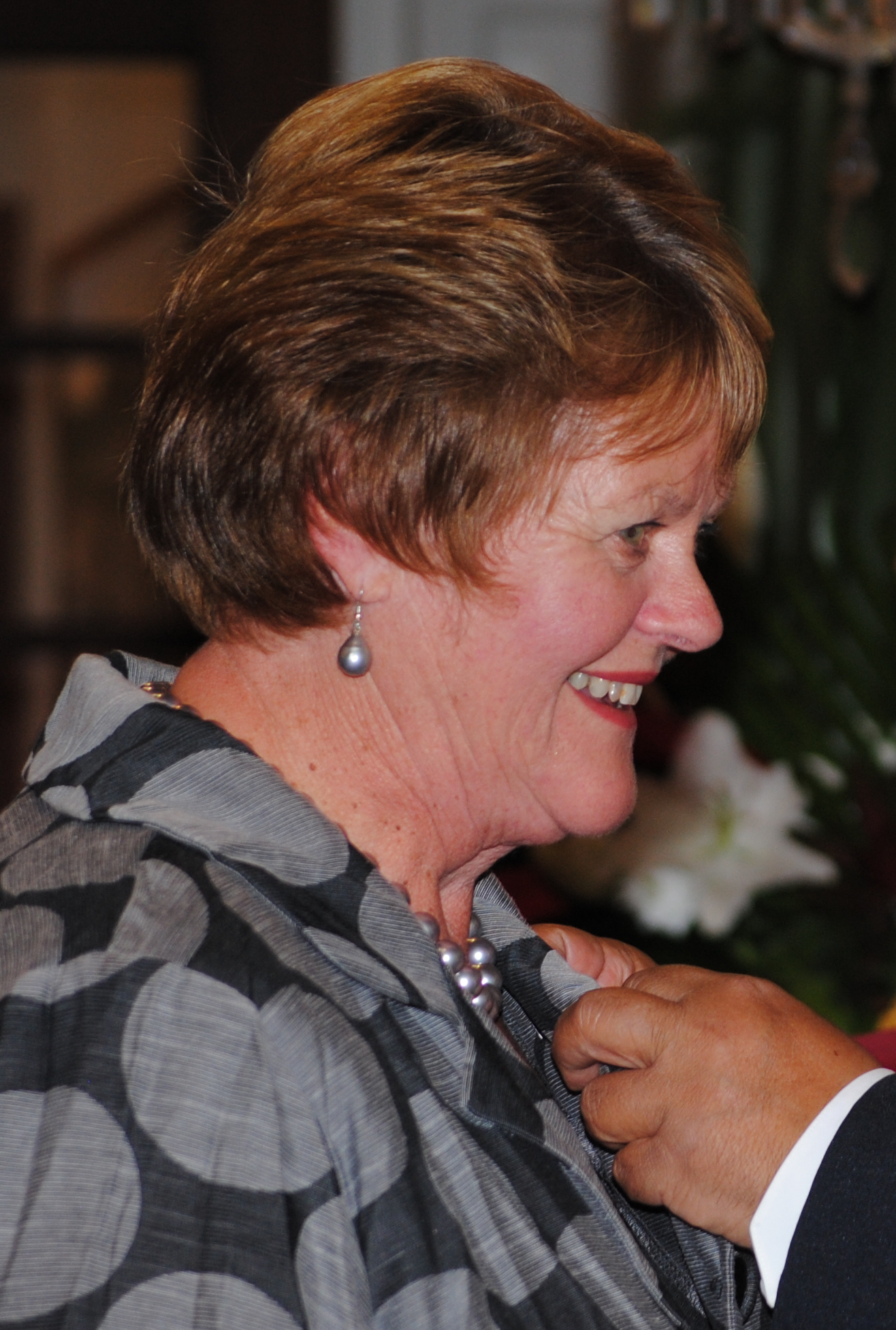
Maureen Reynolds

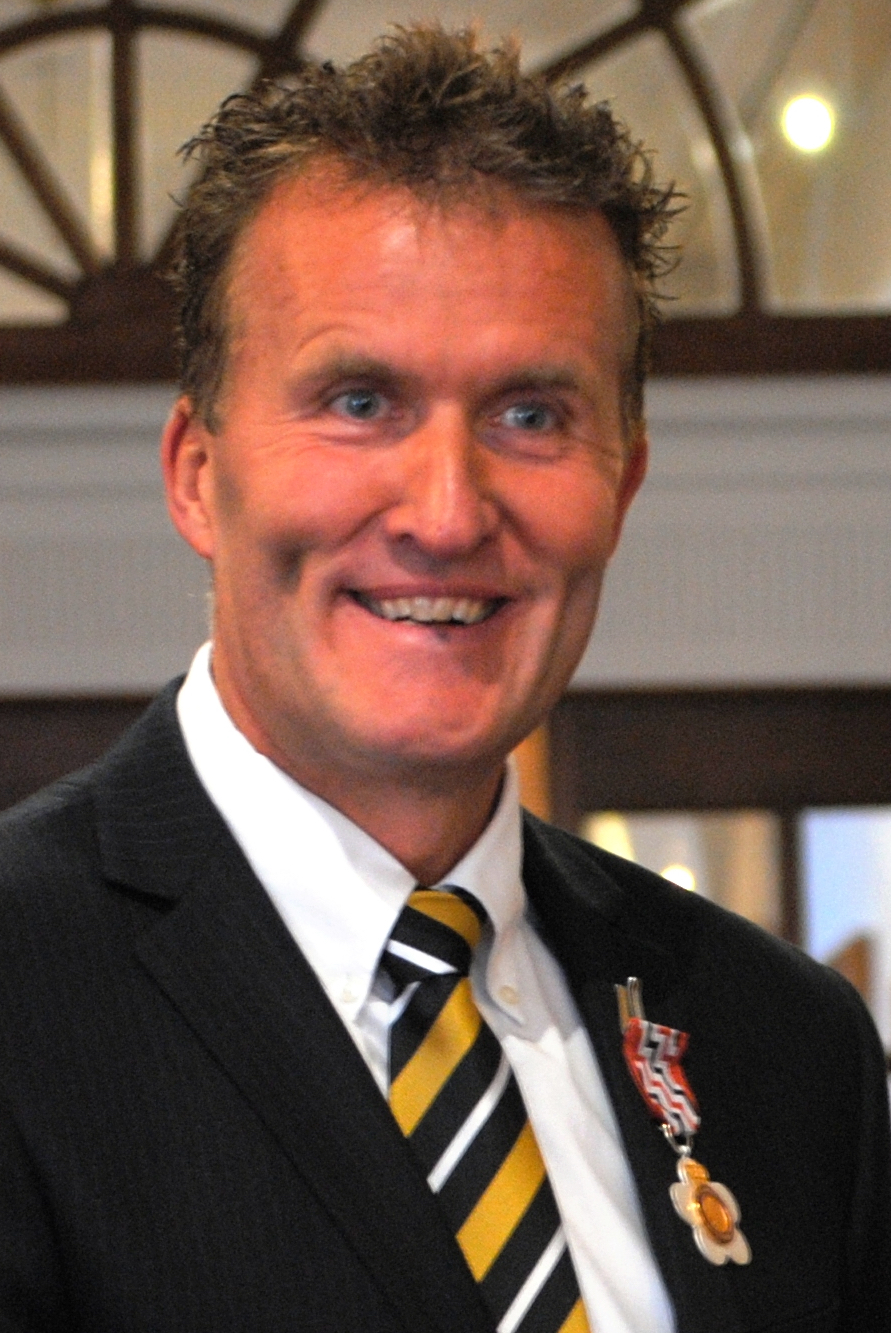
Peter Tennent

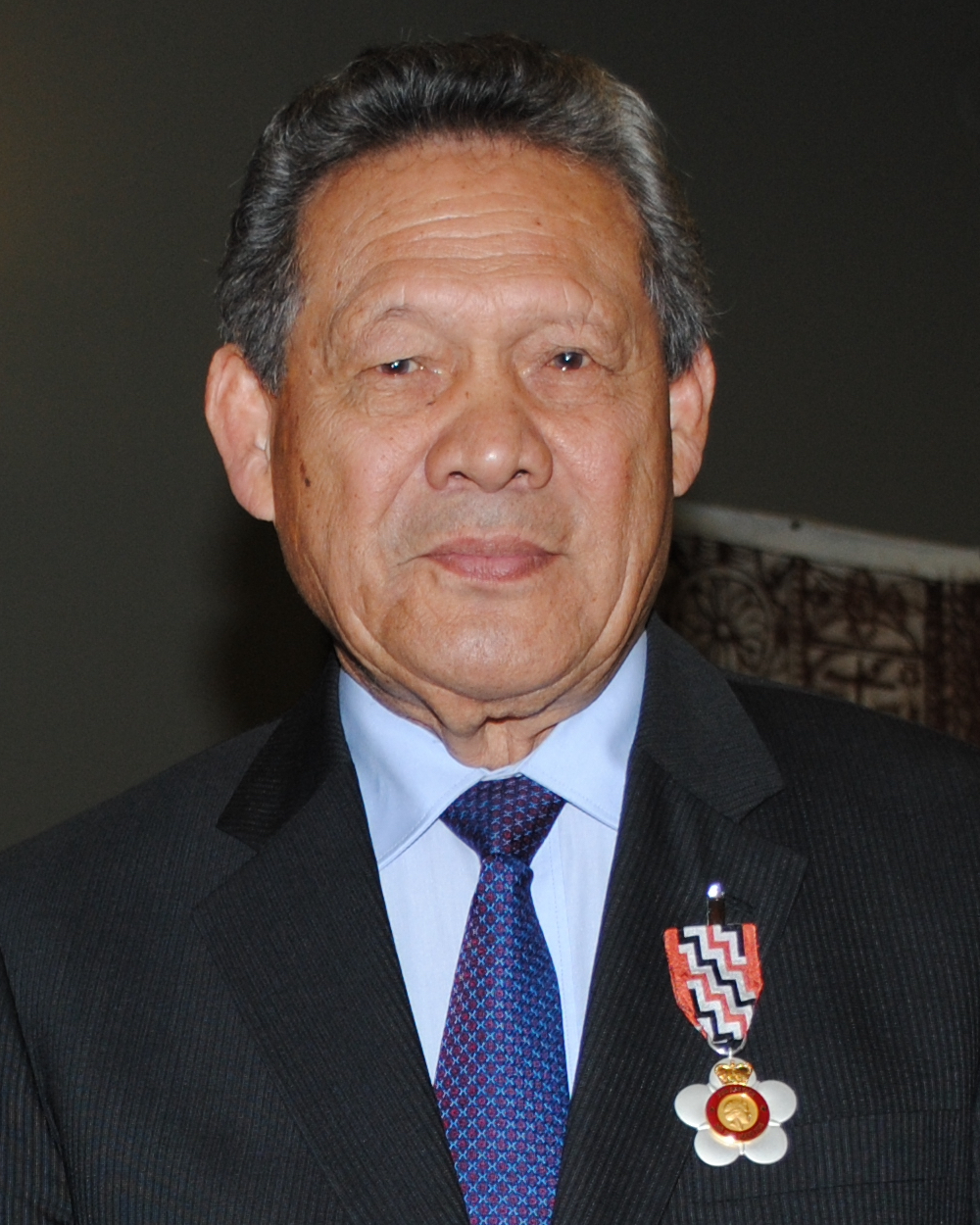
Joe Williams

== Queen's Service Medal (QSM) ==
- Robert Shelley Abbott – of Christchurch. For services to the hearing impaired.
- Lois Ann Aitkenhead – of Nelson. For services to the community.
- John Neville Anderson – of Rangiora. For services to the New Zealand Customs Service.
- Lorna Anne Anderson – of Otautau. For services to the community.
- Margaret Joan Arnold – of Christchurch. For services to women and the community.
- Thevarajan Arumugam – of Auckland. For services to the Tamil community.
- Alan Francis Atkinson – of Greymouth. For services to children.
- David Bolam-Smith – of Christchurch. For services to the community.
- George Anthony Borthwick – of Wellington. For services to The Salvation Army.
- Stewart Bowden JP – of Whangārei. For services to the community.
- Vivien Mary Broughton – of Blenheim. For services to the community.
- Alexander Brian Calder – of Ruakākā. For services to the New Zealand Fire Service.
- Heugh Henry Noel Chappell – of Havelock North. For services to broadcasting and the community.
- Fay Patricia Colthurst JP – of Whangārei. For services to the community.
- Rex Peter Andrea Da Vanzo – of Wellington. For services to the community.
- Murray Bentham Daniels – of Christchurch. For services to marine conservation.
- Chief Fire Officer David John Edhouse JP – of Ōwhango. For services to the New Zealand Fire Service.
- Su'a Saimolialevalasi Margueritta Ekepati-Leilua – of Auckland. For services to the Pacific Island community.
- Peter Donaldson Ellery – of Palmerston North. For services to brass bands.
- Barry Peter Finch JP – of New Plymouth. For services to the community.
- Foai Suka Foai – of Auckland. For services to the Tokelauan community.
- David Walker Frew – of Riverton. For services to the community.
- Inspector David Hugh Gaskin – of Timaru. For services to the New Zealand Police.
- Rahera Whareti Gibson – of Tolaga Bay. For services to Māori.
- Kevin Gordon Greer – of Palmerston North. For services to the community.
- Colin Donald Gunn – of Nelson. For services to the community.
- Murray Kenneth Marshall Hansen JP – of Kawerau. For services to the community.
- Penelope Jane Hansen JP – of Auckland. For services to literature and the community.
- Annette Mary Harris JP – of Christchurch. For services to the community.
- Gavin Neil Henderson – of Christchurch. For services to the community.
- Lesley Margaret Jackson – of Hokitika. For services to music and the community.
- David Gareth James – of Auckland. For services to education.
- Joan Grace Kehely JP – of Tauranga. For services to local-body affairs.
- Bernard Seth Kingsbury JP – of Cust. For services to the New Zealand Fire Service.
- Sally McFarlane Macdonald – of Te Anau. For services to the community.
- Ivan Beaumont Mandahl – of Feilding. For services to the community.
- John Douglas McClelland – of Lower Hutt. For services to the New Zealand Police.
- John Desmond Miller – of Gore. For services to the community.
- William Ross Morgan JP – of Cambridge. For services to the community.
- Elsie Gertrude Morriss – of Ashburton. For services to the arts.
- Elspeth Eleanor Mount – of Auckland. For services to the community.
- Ataraita Adelaide Ngatai JP – of Tauranga. For services to Māori.
- Enoka Ngatai – of Tauranga. For services to Māori.
- Harshadrai Khapabhai Patel – of Auckland. For services to the Indian community.
- John Frederick Pettit – of Auckland. For services to the community.
- Rosemary Ruth Reid – of Alexandra. For services to music.
- John Douglas Rhind – of Christchurch. For services as a funeral director.
- Inspector Kevin John Riordan – of Wellington. For services to the New Zealand Police.
- Gurmeeta Singh JP – of Auckland. For services to the community.
- Peter Ben Snow – of Upper Hutt. For services to the community.
- Charles Richard Stewart – of Timaru. For services to youth.
- Judith Raylene Stewart – of Timaru. For services to youth.
- Sergeant Marie Theresa Stratford – of Auckland. For services to the New Zealand Police.
- Niu Sila Mataio Taupe – of Porirua. For services to the Tokelauan community.
- Kororia Tangihaere Theodore – of Auckland. For services to the community.
- William John Vaile – of Westport. For services to the community.
- Ngapo Wehi JP – of Auckland. For services to Māori.
- Jillian Mary Wychel – of Auckland. For services to education.
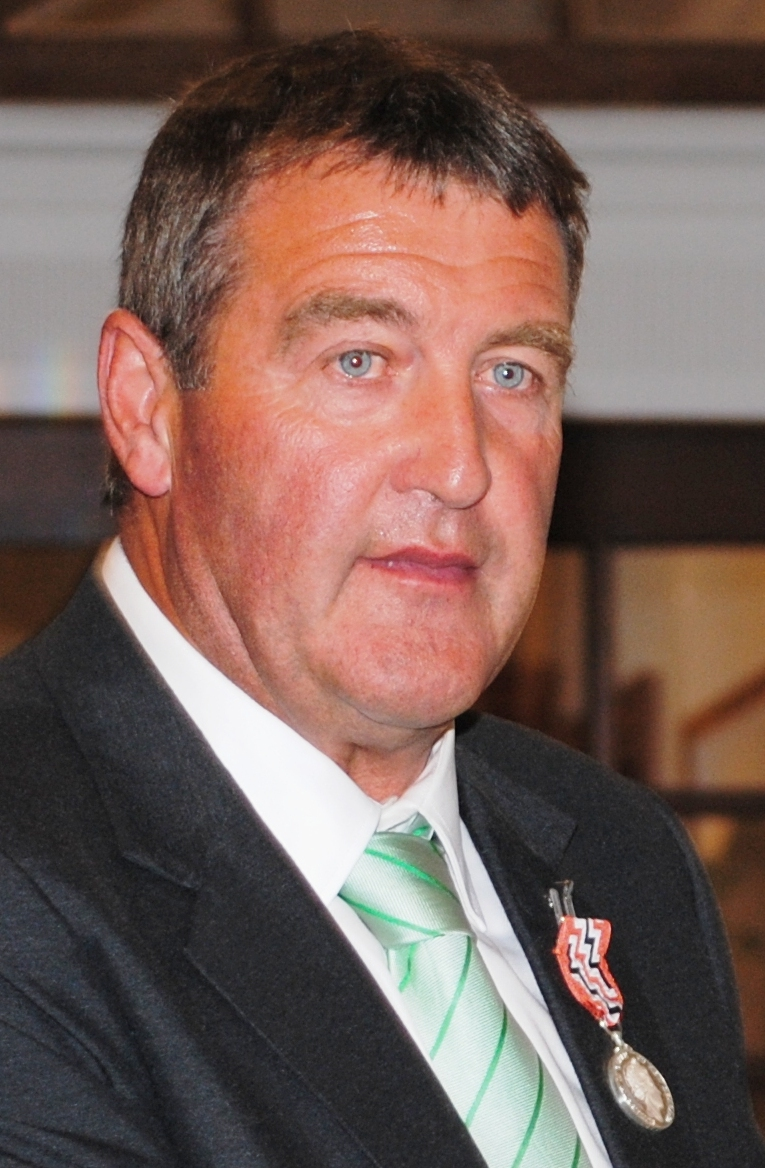
Alan Atkinson

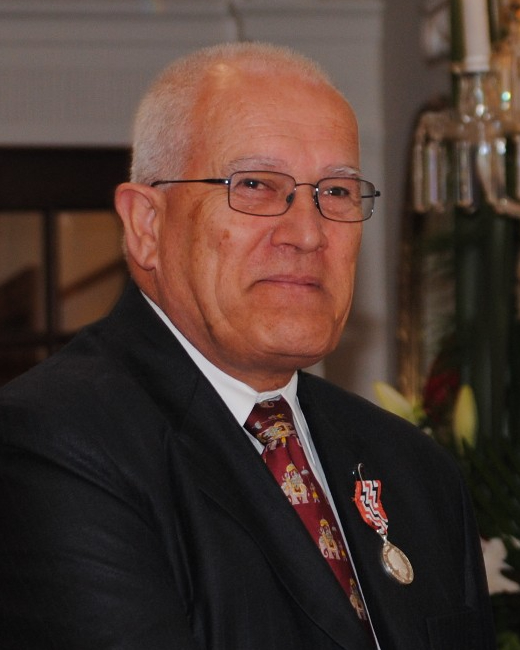
George Borthwick

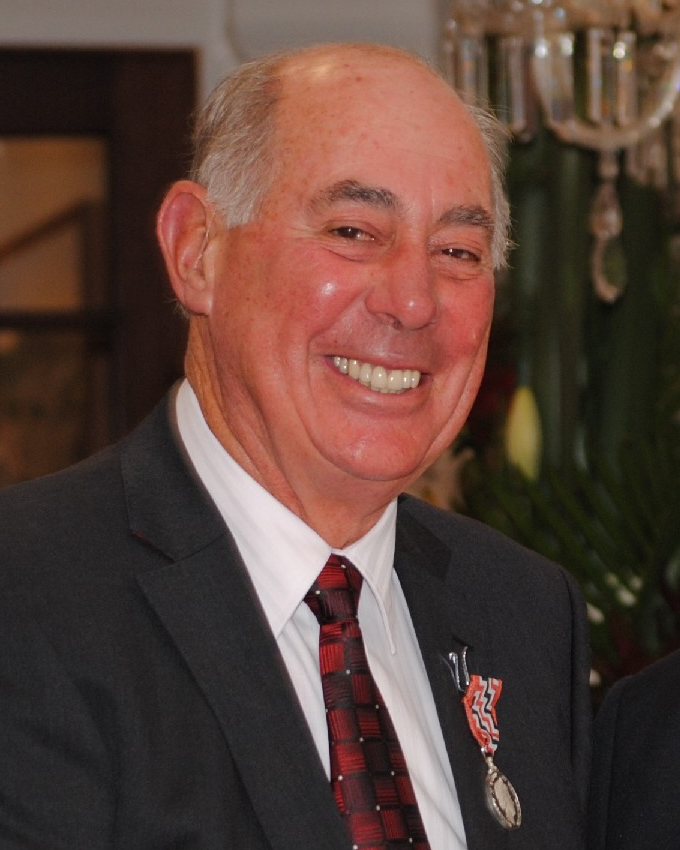
Kevin Greer

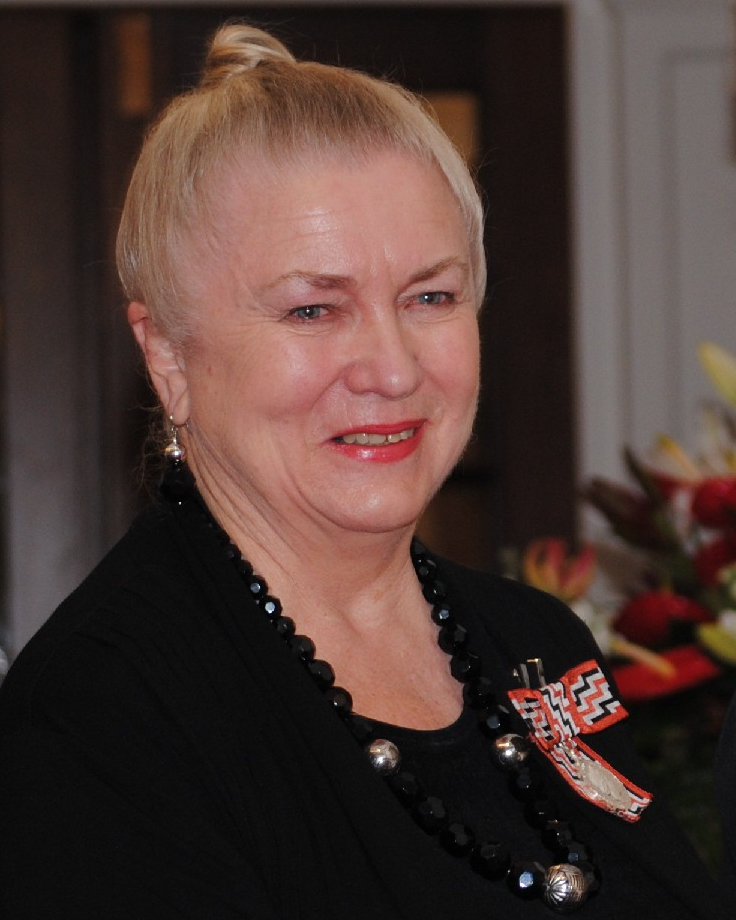
Annette Harris

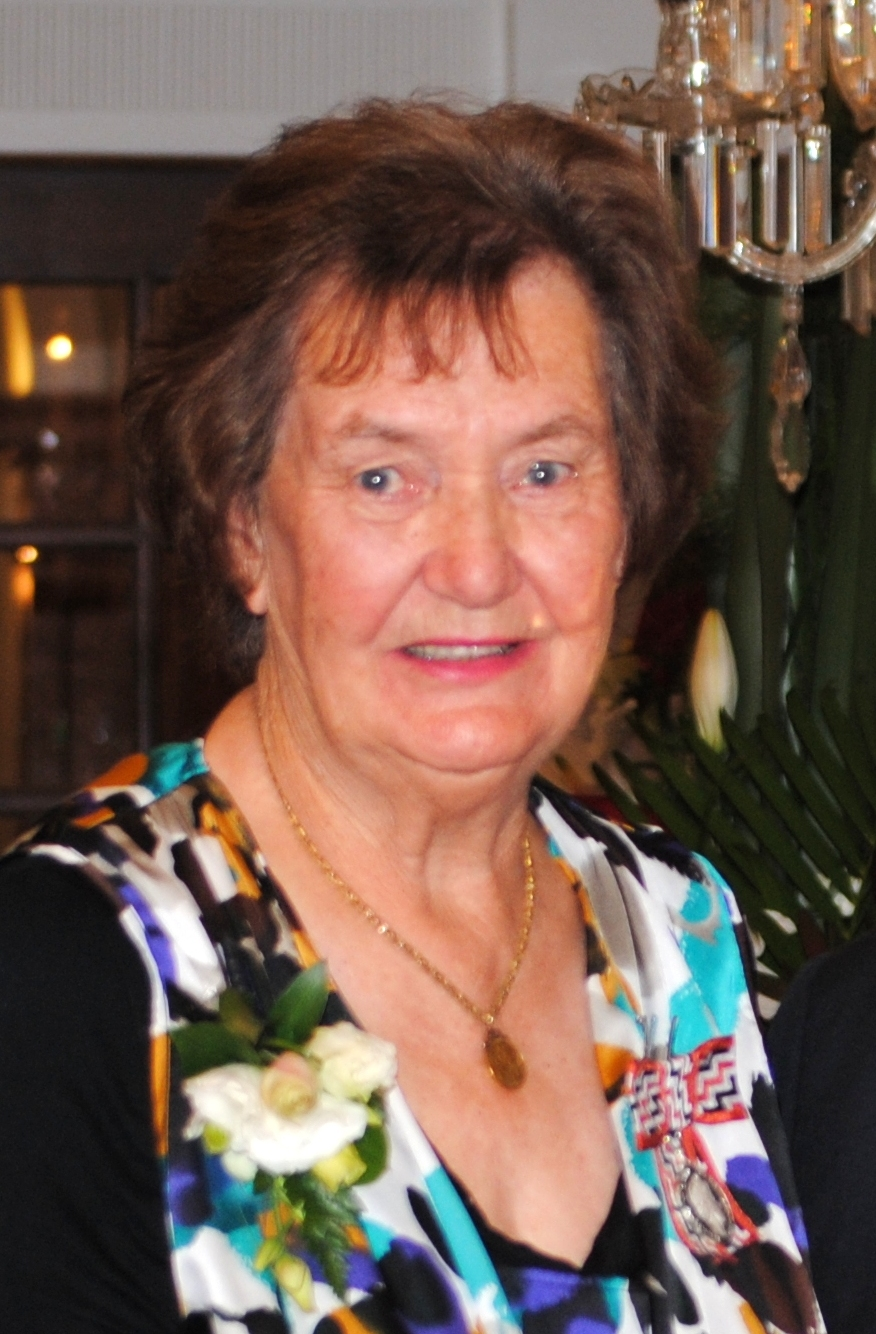
Lesley Jackson

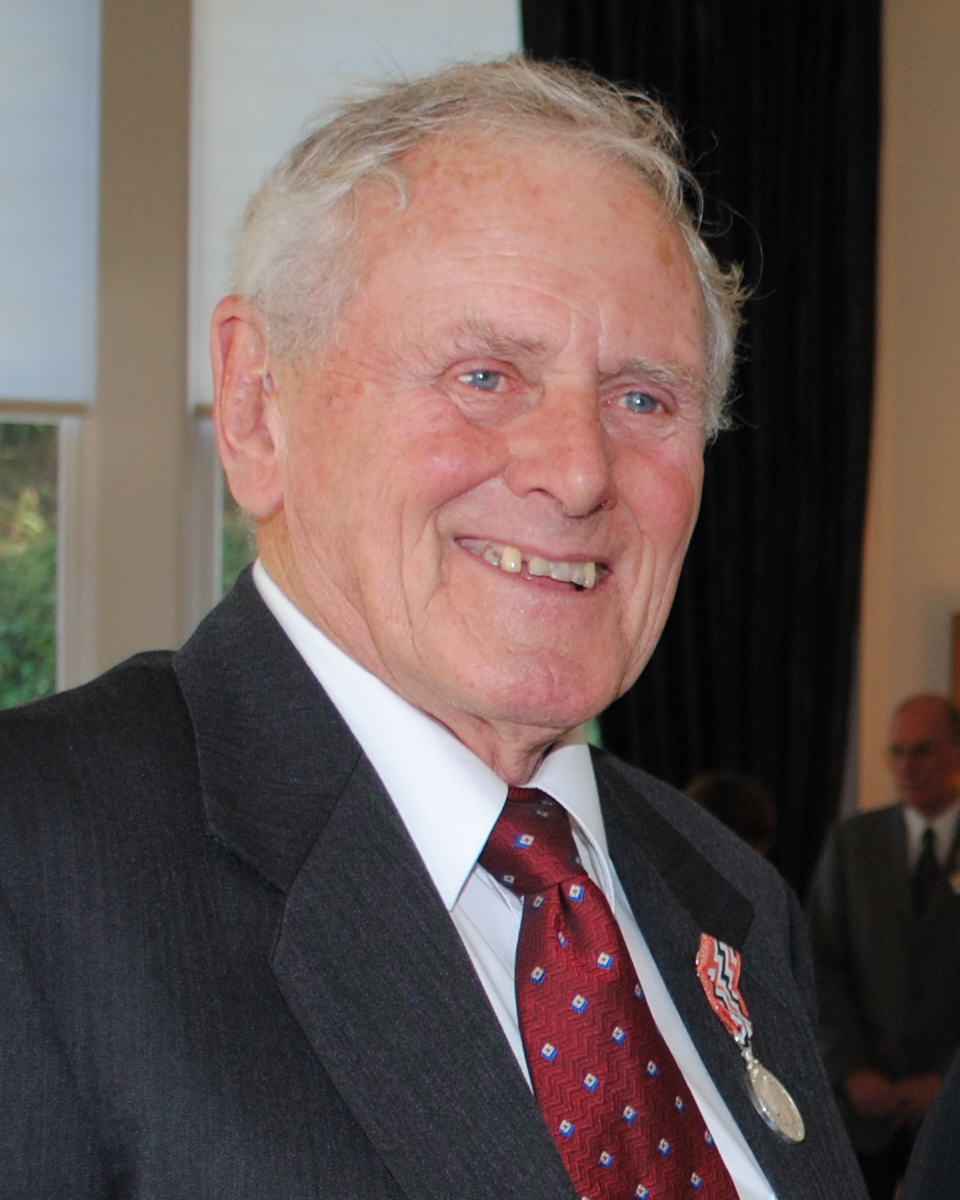
John Pettit

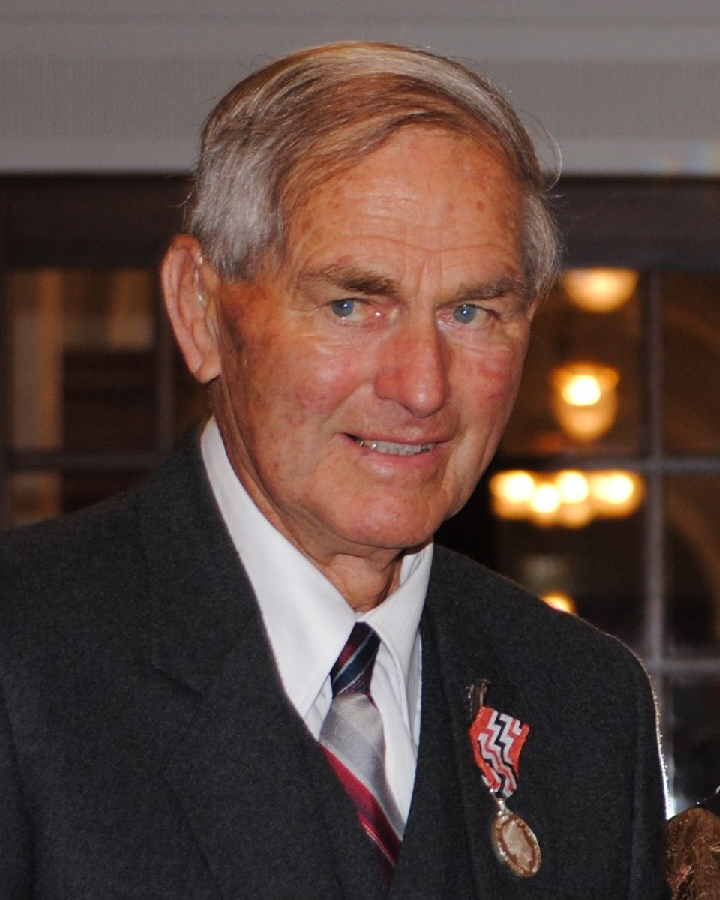
Charles Stewart

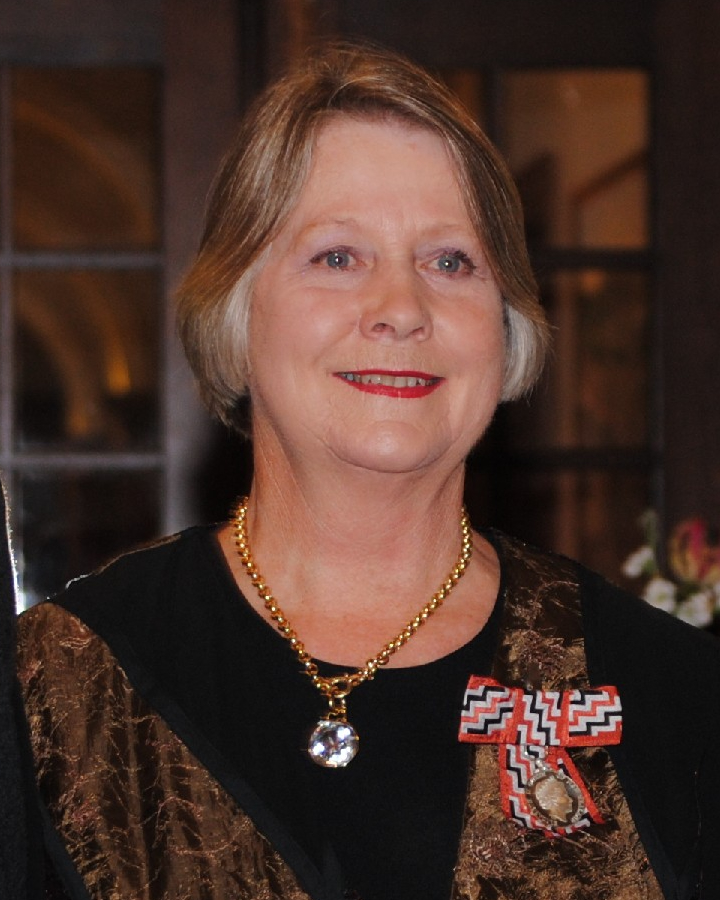
Judith Stewart

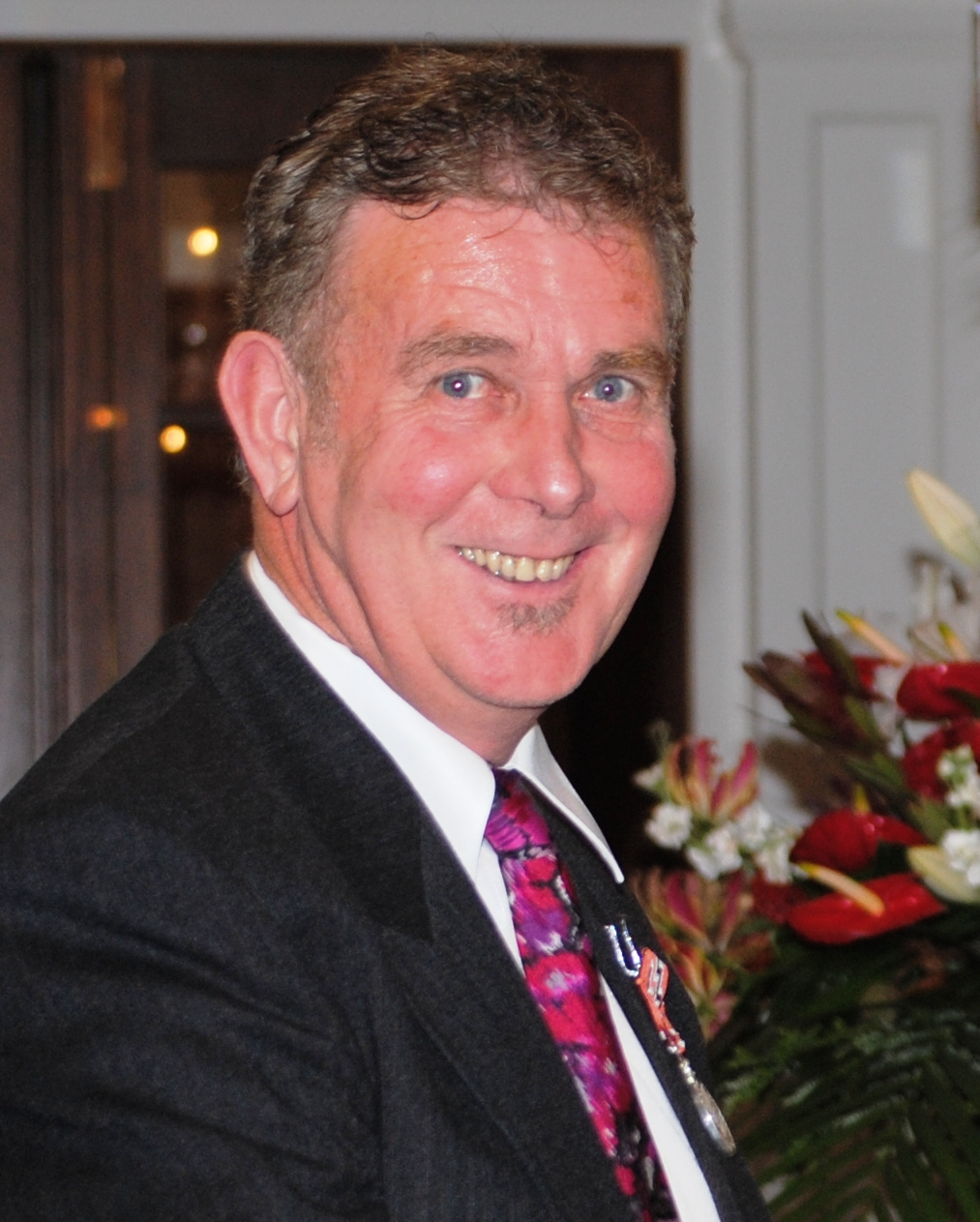
John Vaile

== New Zealand Distinguished Service Decoration (DSD) ==
- Captain Suzanne Lynn Koia – Royal New Zealand Nursing Corps.
- Warrant Officer Class Two Wiremu Beamish Simon Moffitt – of Auckland. (Note: For security reasons, this award was not made public until announced in the New Zealand Gazette of 27 June 2024.)
- Warrant Officer Donald Napier – Royal New Zealand Air Force.
