= List of shipwrecks of Southland =

There is a long history of shipwrecks and vessels capsizing or being lost in the seas around the Southland Region of New Zealand. The worst incident was on 29 April 1881, when the SS Tararua struck Otara reef 13 km (8.1 mi) off Waipapa Point. Of the ship's 151 passengers, only 20 survived. This incident is the worst maritime disaster for civilian vessels in New Zealand's history. The disaster led to the establishment of a lighthouse at Waipapa Point. Serious incidents with multiple fatalities have continued into the 21st century, and the Bluff Coastguard is often called upon to assist vessels in distress in Foveaux Strait.

== Foveaux Strait ==
Ship	Flag	Sunk Date	Location	Description	Fatalities	Reference(s)	Coordinates
Unknown		1836	Wreckage between Passage Islands and Toetoes Bay	Unknown ship of about 300 tons	Unknown		
Unknown		1858	Struck the sandbar between Aparima River beach and Steep Island	"Wedding boat" of eight or ten tons	6+		
Jack Frost		1864	Lost going from Bluff to Melbourne. Sheltered from a hurricane off Stewart Island and not seen again. Wreckage found at Doughboy Bay, Stewart Island and Chalky Inlet.	American ship built in 1857	all		
John		1864	Abandoned at Invercargill	59 foot wooden two-masted schooner. Previously wrecked at Tasmania in 1852.	nil		
Cutter No 2		1864	Lost going from Invercargill to Bluff to refloat Scotia, found and taken in tow by Electra, then abandoned due to rising water.	Lighter	nil		
James Daly		1866	Waikawa	schooner	3		
Laughing Water		1870	SW of Pahia Point	411 ton wooden barque	1		
Unknown		1875	off Orepuki	Whaleboat	3		
Unknown		1875	off Orepuki	Whaleboat	7		
The William Ackers		1876	Waipapa Point	Cargo Ship	8		
Halcyon		1877	Engine failure at Orepuke in Te Waewae Bay	34.55 tons gross, 24.35 tons net wooden twin-screw steamer	nil		
Sarah Jane		1879	Foveaux Strait	Cutter	3		
Helen and Jane		1879	Mussel Beach, Te Waewae Bay	60 ton schooner	nil		
SS Tararua		1881	Otara Reef 13 km (8.1 mi) offshore of Waipapa Point	Passenger steamer	131		
Arrow		1881	Anchor failure at Pahia	10 ton cutter	nil		
Lillie Denham		1883	Sank near Bunker Island in Foveaux Strait	31 tons gross, 21 tons net, wooden ketch-rigged screw steamer	nil		
Marie Ange		1884	Solander Island or Foveaux Strait	275 ton iron barque	all		
Champion		1885	mouth of Paterson Inlet	Cutter, formerly a lifeboat on Champion of the Seas	3		
Nellie		1888	11 km (6.8 mi) offshore of Dog Island	12 ton fishing schooner	1		
Star of Erin		1892	Waipapa Point	Cargo Ship	nil		
Camille		1892	Foundered in Foveaux Strait after a pump failure	221 ton brigantine	nil		
Philadelphia		1898	Wreckage at Orepuki	1,710 ton steel full-rigged ship	all		
Aparima		1899	Colac Bay	22 ton schooner	nil		
Iris		1913	Between Ruapuke Island and Bluff	4 ton auxiliary cutter	4		
Moana		1923	Monkey Island	Fishing launch	nil		
Mararoa		1930	Foveaux Strait	Fishing launch	2		
Black Cat		1937	Sank at oyster beds near Bluff after colliding with Rita	28 tons gross, 9 tons net steamer. Previously called Riwaka	nil		
Waikouaiti		1939	South-east corner of Dog Island	Cargo Ship	nil		
Horouta		1942	Anchored at Raratoka Island (Centre Island), but dragged the anchor and went onto the northeast point of the island	65 tons gross, 25 tons net, twin screw scow, originally a schooner-rigged scow.	nil		
Sea Mew		1954	Foveaux Strait	Fishing vessel	1		
Te Konini		1955	Ran aground in Colac Bay.	48 foot fishing vessel	nil		
Reo Moana		1959	Foveaux Strait	50 foot motor trawler	3		
Madge		1960	Sank after engine trouble	36 foot fishing vessel	nil		
Star of the Sea		1963	Long Point, west of Tuatapere	Fishing vessel	1		
Cascade		1967	Capsized by a freak wave near Riverton / Aparima	28 foot fishing vessel	nil		
Seabird		1971	Capsized in mountainous seas near Raratoka (Centre) Island	Wooden fishing vessel	nil		
Golden Spray		1971	Omaui Island	Wooden fishing launch	1		
Waimanu		1973	Driven ashore by a gail in Colac Bay. Two other fishing vessels were also driven ashore but did not suffer major damage.	36 foot wooden fishing vessel	nil		
Malibu		1974	Hit a submerged rock near Raratoka (Centre) Island	40.6 foot fishing vessel	nil		
Zephus		1977	Colac Bay	8.5 m fishing vessel	nil		
Capri		1978	Solander Island	16 m wooden-hulled fishing vessel	nil		
Aoteama		1978	Foveaux Strait	Wooden fishing vessel	2		
Venus		1980	Struck an object near Ruapuke Island	10.3 m fishing vessel	nil		
Manaroa		1981	Drifted onto Solander Island after a gear failure	20.78 gross tons, 6.82 register tons wooden fishing vessel	nil		
Unknown		1984	off Stirling Point	Dinghy	2		
Cygnet		1985	Foveaux Strait	Fishing vessel	3		
Rangi		1987	Foveaux Strait	Wooden fishing vessel	2		
Linda Marie		1988	Foveaux Strait	Fishing vessel	2		
Avenger		1996	Foveaux Strait	Fishing vessel	2		
Waterlily		1998	Ruapuke Island	48 foot launch, originally named Digger	nil		
Unknown		2001	off Stirling Point	Dinghy	1		
Unknown		2010	north of Dog Island	Dinghy	1		
Extreme 1		2012	off Ruapuke Island	Recreational fishing vessel	2		
Torea		2012	Green Island, near Ruapuke Island	Fishing vessel	nil		
Munetra		2014	Foveaux Strait	Yacht	3		
Ayson		2014	off Stirling Point	Fishing vessel	nil		
Unknown		2024	Capsized on Riverton bar	Recreational vessel	3		

== Stewart Island ==
Ship	Flag	Sunk Date	Location and notes	Description	Fatalities	Reference(s)	Coordinates
Industry		1831	Easy Harbour, southwest Stewart Island	Brig	17		
Workington		1857	Deliberately run aground at Smokey Cove due to a leaking hull	150 ton Brig	nil		
Lochinvar		1863	Beached at Halfmoon Bay but subsequently salvaged and later wrecked in Fiji in 1868	199 ton Brig	nil		
Pacific		1864	Paterson Inlet	347 tun Full-rigged ship	nil		
Zephyr		1866	Deliberately run aground in Paterson Inlet due to leaks. Salvaged and later wrecked in Bass Strait in 1882.	Schooner	nil		
Amherst		1866	Taking on water and managed to reach Port William before sinking	93.1 foot wooden two-masted whaling brig. Later raised and reregistered.	nil		
Calypso		1866	near Port William	152 ton Brig	1 (Note: Diggle says a seaman was struck on the skull but received surgery and recovered. This might be the reason for the claim of a life lost.)		
Hannah		1881	Broad Bay	Cutter	nil		
Emilie		1890	Disabled by a hurricane west of Puysegur Point and ran aground at the southern point of Stewart Island after drifting for five days.	729 ton Barque	9		
Eclipse		1894	off Paterson Inlet	33 ton Cutter	nil		
Cavalier		1901	Mason Bay	36 ton Ketch	nil		
Thistle		1903	Halfmoon Bay	Racing cutter	nil		
Heather Bell		1907	Sealers Bay, Codfish Island / Whenua Hou	26 ton Cutter	nil		
Ruahine		1910	Halfmoon Bay	12 ton Auxiliary cutter	nil		
Nautilus		1911	Manning's Bay. Previously wrecked on Whale Island in 1867 and salvaged.	30 ton Cutter	nil		
Twilight		1929	Based at Stewart Island. Missing, fate unknown.	Wooden cutter	3		
Kotare		1931	Paterson Inlet	147 tons gross, 83 tons net Wooden steamer	nil		
Valmai		1951	Edwards Island, one of the Tītī / Muttonbird Islands	Ketch rigged fishing vessel	nil		
Inga		1952		Fishing launch	nil		
Ngaitahu		1953	East Ruggedy, northwest Stewart Island	Fishing vessel	1		
Radium		1956	Halfmoon Bay	Launch	nil		
Skylark		1957	South Cape / Whiore	36 foot fishing vessel	nil		
Maranui		1960	Halfmoon Bay	37 foot fishing vessel	nil		
Little Glory		1960	near Whero Island, Paterson Inlet	Fishing vessel	nil		
Lena		1963		Fishing vessel	nil		
Marlborough		1963	Mokinui / Big Moggy Island	40 foot fishing vessel	nil		
Chance		1963	Southwest coast of Stewart Island	45 foot wooden fishing vessel	nil		
Scout		1963	Johnsons Rock, north of Port Pegasus	48 foot fishing vessel	nil		
Britannia		1964		58 foot wooden vessel, originally a schooner, converted to steam and then diesel.	nil		
Marie		1965	Christmas Village Bay, northeast Stewart Island	40 foot fishing vessel	nil		
Sea Hawk		1966	Bench Island, east of Stewart Island	Fishing vessel	nil		
Hananui		1968	Halfmoon Bay	38 foot fishing vessel	nil		
Westward Ho		1968	White Rock, southeast Stewart Island	45 foot fishing vessel	nil		
Coral		1970		28 foot fishing vessel	nil		
Awarua		1970	Later refloated and the transom replaced. Still active at Bluff in 2008.	37 foot fishing vessel	nil		
Mistral		1970	Struck a rock near Codfish Island / Whenua Hou and sank near Yankee River mouth	41 foot wooden fishing vessel	nil		
Evening Star		1971	South Cape, near Murphy Island	47.5 foot wooden fishing vessel	nil		
Andrea		1972	Tia Island, Port Adventure, eastern Stewart Island	33 foot fishing vessel	nil		
Olga		1973	Murray River	9.75 m pleasure launch / trawler	2		
Waikaremoana		1974	Whale Rock near Red Head	22.97 gross tons, 11.91 register tons, fishing vessel	nil		
San Marie		1975	Exploded and burnt near Murray River mouth	52 foot fishing vessel	nil		
Sou West		1975		Fishing vessel	nil		
Sharon		1977	Ernest Island, southeast Stewart Island	22.90 gross tons, 9.12 register tons, fishing vessel	nil		
Iona		1977	Ernest Islands, west Stewart Island	12.5 m fishing vessel	nil		
Harbinger		1978	Halfmoon Bay	11.5 m fishing vessel	nil		
Kowhai		1978	Broad Head, south Stewart Island	25.35 gross tons, 6.97 register tons, wooden fishing vessel	nil		
Mapua		1978	Breaksea Islands	21.99 gross tons, 4.18 register tons, fibreglass fishing vessel	3		
Peraki		1978	Rammed by Psyche in Broad Passage (Big Ship Passage) between Pearl Island and Stewart Island	11.8 gross tons, 8.35 register tons, wooden fishing vessel	nil		
Wyoming		1980	Halfmoon Bay	10.5 m fishing vessel	nil		
Muritai		1980	Edwards Island	10.5 m fishing vessel	nil		
Nederburg		1980	Carter Passage, southeast of Halfmoon Bay	11 m fishing vessel	nil		
Linda Carol		1981	Paterson Inlet	Fishing vessel	nil		
Spray		1981	Codfish Island / Whenua Hou	11.5 m fishing vessel	nil		
Barend Jan		1981		9 m fishing vessel	nil		
Komuri		1981	Rugged Islands, northwest Stewart Island	13.35 gross tons, 4.86 register tons, wooden fishing vessel	nil		
Annie		1983	Between Weka Island and Port Adventure	13 m wooden fishing vessel	nil		
Sea Star		1987	Seal Point near Port Pegasus	14 m wooden fishing vessel	nil		
Dong Won 529		1998	Breaksea Islands	68.4 m, 385 gross ton fishing vessel	nil		
John A Settree		1999	Big Kuri Bay	42 foot cutter, formerly a pleasure boat	nil		
Marine Maid		2000	Barclay Rock, east of Halfmoon Bay	59 foot cargo vessel, former trawler	nil		
M N Subritzky		2000	Near Edwards Island	11.58 m vessel	nil		
Bargara		2003	Hit a log nine miles from Codfish Island	21.6 m fishing vessel	nil		
Kotuku		2006	Capsized near Womens Island	12.8 m, 26 ton fishing vessel	6		
Easy Rider		2012	Capsized near Saddle Point	38 foot fishing vessel	8		
Secret		2012	Drifted into Horseshoe Bay after her moorings broke	33 foot ketch, built in Horseshoe Bay in 1898	nil		
Surest-700		2013	Grounded on rocks at Paterson Inlet. Ruptured fuel tanks spilled diesel.	88 m fishing trawler	nil		
Henerata		2019	Capsized while crossing Paterson Inlet	Water taxi	nil		

== Bluff ==
Ship	Flag	Sunk Date	Location and notes	Description	Fatalities	Reference(s)	Coordinates
Success		1845	The cable fouled while raising anchor and the ship drifted onto rocks	82 ton schooner	nil		
Amazon		1852	Pelham Rock	77 foot schooner	nil		
William Hyde		1856	Bluff	111.8 foot wooden three-masted ship. Raised two years later and became a store ship at Port Chalmers.	nil		
Oberon		1861	Struck a rock mid-channel, and was deliberately grounded at Hell Gate to prevent sinking. Later recovered and renamed Guiding Star.	102 tons gross, 69 tons net, iron screw steamer	nil		
Ocean Chief		1862	Driven ashore at "Taenae Point" (Tiwai Point?). Refloated, but burned by some of the crew 20 days later.	1026 ton Black Ball clipper ship	nil		
Flying Mist		1862	Inadequately anchored, and after deserting crew members slipped a cable, the ship hit a rock in Bluff Harbour and sank.	1204 ton full-rigged ship	nil		
Prince Albert		1862	After salvaging cargo from the Flying Mist, and with the crew possibly drunk with salvaged alcohol, ran ashore at "Toitois Beach" (Toetoes Bay).	90 ton brig (probably)	nil		
Time and Truth		1863	Stirling Point	539 ton barque	nil		
Scotia		1864	Stirling Point	872 ton gross, 647 ton net barque-rigged steamer	nil		
Dorcas		1869	Tiwai Point	10 ton cutter	nil		
Carl		1874	Triangle Rock	167 ton brig. A former blackbirder.	nil		
Lerwick		1875	Anchor failure between Stirling and Burial points	14 ton cutter	nil		
Ann Gambles		1878	Tiwai Point	424 ton iron barque	nil		
Anna		1880	Capsized at Bluff Harbour entrance	27-ton ketch	3		
England's Glory		1881	Entrance to Bluff Harbour	751 ton iron barque, formerly a full-rigged ship	nil		
Pelham		1886	Lookout Point	423 tons gross, 228 tons net, iron screw steamer. Originally a brig, then a barque.	nil		
Kokeno		1886	Lower anchorage. A cable parted and the ship drifted onto the shore. Later refloated and repaired.	Government-owned Schooner	nil		
Maid of Otago		1886	Stirling Point. Struck the remains of the Pelham, the same night as the Kokeno wreck.	50 ton schooner	nil		
Elizabeth and Ulvaria Cameron		1889	Tiwai Point	40 ton schooner, 23-years old and called "a floating coffin".	nil		
Clyde		1901	Bushy Point, near Fortrose	21 ton schooner, originally a 30 ton steamer	nil		
Madeline		1901	Bluff Harbour	Unregistered ketch	nil		
Brothers		1903	Benzene explosion and subsequent fire while docked at Bluff Harbour	54 ton auxiliary schooner	nil		
Okta		1913	Stirling Point. Same rock as Scotia, Maid of Otago and Pelham.	1110 tons gross, 1058 tons net, iron barque. Originally named Jessie Osborne and then Mariposa.	nil		
Dolly Varden		1919	Bluff Harbour	28 tons gross, 17 tons net, auxiliary schooner	nil		
Konini		1924	Whale Head (Southwest Point)	1420 tons gross, 833 tons net, steamer	nil		
Loyalty		1925	Sank at the wharf after explosives were detonated in an attempt to float the body of a fisherman.	101 tons gross, 24 tons net, wooden screw steamer. Formerly a French gunboat.	nil		
Unnamed		1928	Between Port Craig and Bluff. Wreckage found at Ocean Beach, body found at Stirling Point.	6.5 m launch	1		
Lily		1933	Drifted onto rocks after water in the carburettor caused an engine failure in Bluff Harbour.	13 ton auxiliary ketch	nil		
Stella Maris		1952	Tiwai Point	fishing launch	nil		
Golden Prion		1978	Sank near Stirling Point after colliding with the oyster dredger Torea	53.82 tons gross, 16.76 register tons, wooden oyster fishing vessel. Previously called Prion.	nil		
Olivia		1979	Barracouta Point	11.95 m steel-hulled fishing vessel	nil		

== Fiordland ==
Ship	Flag	Sunk Date	Location and notes	Description	Fatalities	Reference(s)	Coordinates
Endeavour		1795	In poor condition, and struck a rock in Dusky Sound. First known Pākehā ship wrecked in New Zealand.	700–800 ton ship	nil		
Alarm		1880	Struck a reef at the entrance to Taiari / Chalky Inlet. Reported lost but arrived at Stewart Island later.	Unregistered cutter	nil		
Firefly		1881	Left Bluff for Sydney with four or five passengers. Possibly sank off Puysegur Point.	174 ton brig or barque	5+		
Try Again		1887	Wrecked near Martins Bay	Cutter. Formerly a lifeboat. Capsized on two previous occasions with 16 and 4 deaths.	4		
Waikare		1910	Between Indian Island and Passage Islands in Dusky Sound	3071 tons gross, 1901 tons net, steel screw steamer	nil		
Aurora		1951	Struck a log near Puysegur Point.	Fishing vessel	nil		
Morning Star		1953	Leaking badly and with an engine failure, drifted onto rocks near Puysegur Point	48 foot fishing vessel	nil		
Anna		1953	Breaksea Island	35 foot fishing vessel	nil		
Eileen		1954	Dagg Sound	Fishing vessel	nil		
Bisonia		1957	Pigeon Island, in Dusky Sound	Fishing vessel. Sank some years previously in Fiordland but was refloated and refitted.	nil		
Gekeita		1957	Coal Island	fishing vessel	2		
Seaforth		1959	Puysegur Point	motor trawler	2		
Rosie		1961	Swept onto rocks at First Arm, Doubtful Sound after an engine failure	33 foot double-ended fishing vessel	nil		
Amokura		1961	Near George Sound	40 foot fishing vessel	nil		
Rakoa		1962	Entrance of Charles Sound	47 foot fishing vessel	nil		
Manurere II		1963	Little Goat Island, Doubtful Sound	40 foot fishing vessel	nil		
Myth		1964	Looking Glass Bay	Wooden fishing vessel	nil		
Marangi		1965	Dusky Sound	fishing vessel	2		
Star II		1966	Breaksea Sound	25 foot steel fishing vessel	2		
Belle		1967	Struck a submerged log near Big River mouth	46 foot fishing vessel	nil		
Harmony		1967	Struck a submerged rock near Big River mouth	58 foot fishing vessel, formerly a drifter in Scotland	nil		
Julia		1969	Bauza Island, Doubtful Sound	36 foot fishing vessel	nil		
Annette		1971	Struck a rock in Chalky Inlet	37 foot fishing vessel	nil		
Star of the Sea		1971	A large wave near Dagg Sound stove in some planks and the crew could not control the ingress of water	37 foot fishing vessel	nil		
Abel Tasman		1971	After to an engine failure the ship was swept onto the coast near George Sound	32 foot steel-hulled fishing vessel	nil		
Tarewai		1971	Dagg Sound	21 ton wooden fishing vessel, originally a steam ferry in Otago Harbour, then a motor ferry in Auckland	nil		
Wee Lee		1971	Took on water near Stirling Falls in Milford Sound, and the engine could not be started. A hand pump was unable to control the ingress of water.	31.6 foot fishing vessel, previously called Clifton	nil		
Twilight		1972	Struck a rock near George Sound	34.6 foot fishing vessel	nil		
Vital Spark		1972	West Cape	32 foot steel fishing vessel	2		
Scorpio		1972	Developed a leak north of Milford Sound. While being towed, caught fire and sank.	34 foot fishing vessel	nil		
Sea Rover		1972	Near Coal River mouth, a large wave carried the Sea Rover onto a rock.	31.03 ton wooden fishing vessel	nil		
Rakiura		1972	Struck a rock near Yates Point, Milford Sound	48 foot fishing vessel, built about 1920 and rebuilt in 1955	nil		
Shado		1972	Cascade Cove, Dusky Sound	24 foot fishing vessel	nil		
Kaiteke		1972	Caswell Sound	29 foot fibreglass fishing vessel	1		
Ranger		1972	Capsized by three huge waves west of Coal River mouth	45.33 foot fishing vessel	nil		
Weatherley		1973	Sank after a fire near Poison Bay, south of Milford Sound	21.96 ton fishing vessel	nil		
Stina		1973	Struck a rock near Caswell Sound	17.54 ton wooden fishing vessel, built in 1933, and previously involved in a collision with Rosina in 1947.	nil		
Westwind		1973	Breaksea Island	fishing vessel	1		
Coralyn		1974	The engine failed due to a rope fouling the propeller, and Coralyn struck rocks near Cape Providence at the entrance to Chalky Inlet.	40 foot fishing vessel	nil		
Neta		1974	Drifted onto rocks in Breaksea Sound after the engine failed	36.08 foot fishing vessel	nil		
James McLaren		1974	Disappeared in choppy seas probably near West Cape	45 foot steel-hulled fishing vessel	3		
Carole Ann		1975	Struck a rock near Breaksea Island	45 foot fishing vessel	nil		
Catalina		1978	Struck a submerged rock in Dagg Sound	35.08 foot fishing vessel	nil		
Vega		1979	Puysegur Point	Fishing vessel	nil		
Kaikoura		1979	Fiordland	Fishing vessel	nil		
Seeker		1979	An explosion on board started a fire, and Seeker sank in Doubtful Sound despite a helicopter dousing the fire with a monsoon bucket.	13.7 m fishing vessel	nil		
Plucky		1979	Holed near Cape Providence and beached in Chalky Inlet.	11.7 m fishing vessel	nil		
Donald Duck		1979	Struck rocks near Doubtful Sound due to the engine being unresponsive to controls	10 m steel-hulled fishing vessel	nil		
Fredian		1980	Charles Sound	Fishing vessel	nil		
Hercules		1980	Near South Arm of George Sound	11.62 m plywood and fibreglass-hulled fishing vessel	nil		
Tiki		1980	Near Secretary Island	8 m fishing vessel	2		
Valkyr		1980	Caught fire off the coast between Doubtful and Dagg sounds and abandoned by the crew	15 m fishing vessel	nil		
Jo Ann		1981	Hit an unseen rock and sand between Nancy and Charles sounds	10.97 m wooden fishing vessel	nil		
Destiny		1982	Hit a submerged object and sank near Bauza Island in Doubtful Sound	10.9 m fibreglass fishing vessel	nil		
Angela		1982	Hit rocks and sank near Secretary Island	11.2 m wooden fishing vessel, built in 1913	nil		
Marenka		1982	Found wrecked near Secretary Island	9 m fibreglass fishing vessel. The two crew members had been on the Angela wreck earlier in 1982	2		
Medora		1982	Sank at Helena Falls, Deep Cove, after her bilge pump batteries failed	33 ton schooner, built in 1879	nil		
Ajax		1985	Washed onto rocks by a large wave at Seal Island in Dusky Sound	13 m fishing vessel	nil		
Rebel		1986	Prices Point at the Big River mouth	13.5 m wooden fishing vessel	1		
Zeus		1986	Capsized near West Cape	11 m wooden fishing vessel with a hard chine hull	1		
Bounty		1987	Capsized between Breaksea and Dagg sounds	10 m wooden fishing vessel	1		
Loralei		1988	Capsized in Knife and Steel Harbour	13 m steel fishing vessel	1		
Ranginui		1995	Flooded and sank while moored in Breaksea Sound	28.73 m motor vessel, built in 1936 and a former coastal trader	nil		
Privateer		2002	Struck a log off Puysegur Point	37.6 foot wooden double-ender	nil		
Solander		2007	Hit a rock near Gates Harbour	13 m recreational fishing vessel	nil		
Faith		2008	Hit something in Bowen Channel, Dusky Sound	4 m pleasure boat, formerly a fishing vessel	nil		
Waverley		2008	Hit a submerged object near the Shelter Islands in Doubtful Sound, and sank while under tow near Matai Island	15.5 m tourist boat	nil		
Victor Hugo		2010	Struck Whale Rock in Preservation Inlet due to sunstrike	14.7 m wooden fishing vessel	nil		
Charlie Cat		2012	Took on water after the steering failed, and sank near Pack Point in Doubtful Sound	12 m aluminium catamaran	nil		
Sharcaree		2012	Capsized near Chalky Inlet after being hit by a rogue wave	17.71 m wooden fishing boat	nil		
Governor		2012	Wrecked near Yates Point when the net snagged.	11.5 m fishing boat	2		
Amethyst		2013	Struck a rock near Petrel Islands, Dusky Sound	12 m steel fishing boat	2		
