= Puysegur Point Lighthouse =

Lighthouse in Southland, New Zealand

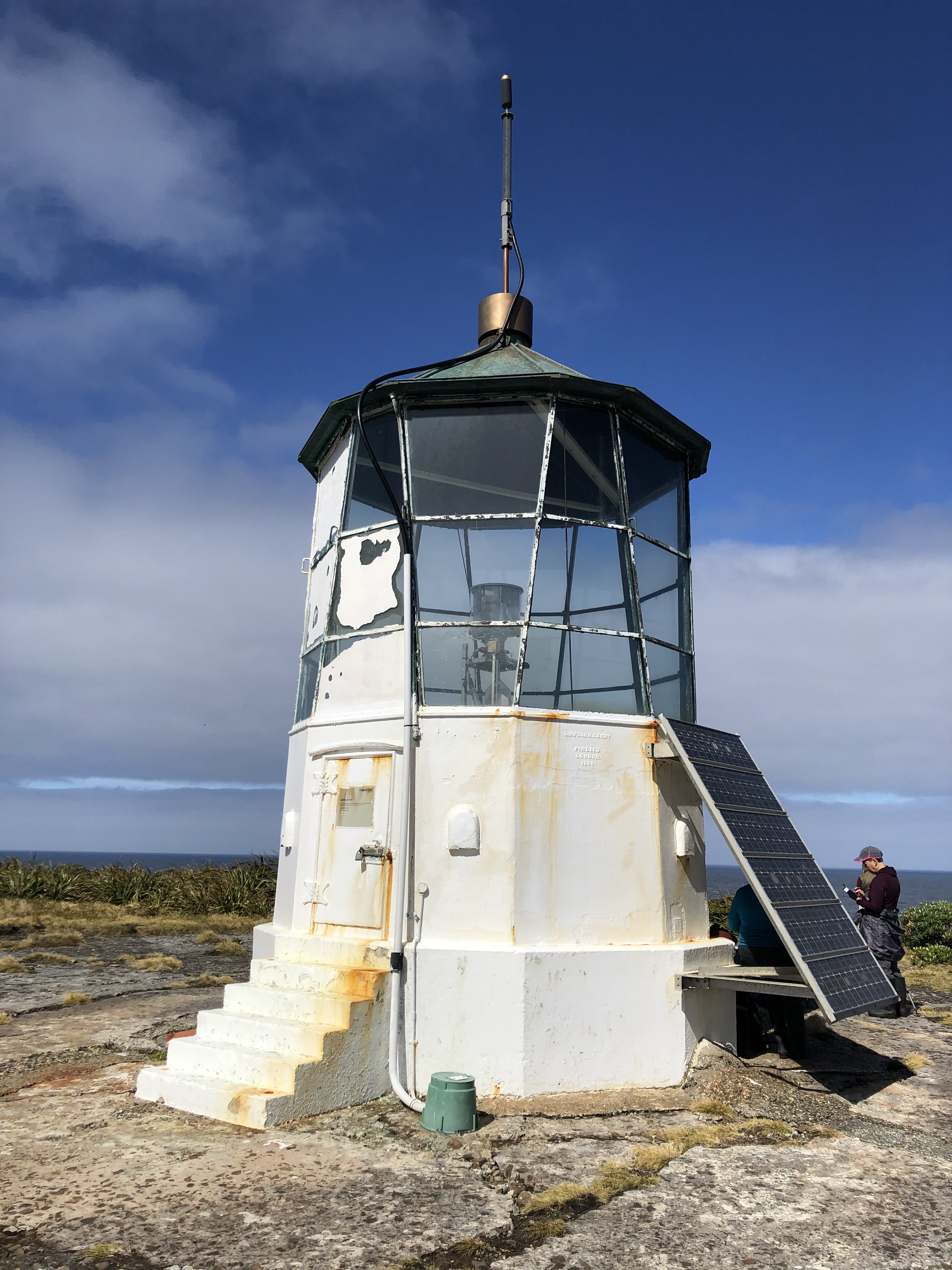
- Location: Puysegur Point, Southland Region, Southland District, New Zealand
- Coordinates: 46°09′22″S 166°36′34″E

Tower
- Constructed: January 1943
- Construction: cast iron
- Automated: 1990
- Height: 5 m (16 ft)
- Shape: octagon
- Power source: solar power

Light
- First lit: January 1943
- Focal height: 45 m (148 ft)
- Lens: second order Fresnel lens
- Light source: rotating LED beacon
- Range: 19 nmi (35 km; 22 mi)
- Characteristic: Fl W 12s
- Original lighthouse
- Constructed: 1878
- Construction: wood
- Height: 40 ft (12 m)
- First lit: 1 March 1879
- Focal height: 180 ft (55 m)
- Lens: first order Fresnel lens
- Characteristic: Fl W 10s

The Puysegur Point Lighthouse is located on a remote headland overlooking the Tasman Sea at the southwest corner of New Zealand's South Island. The Puysegur Point headland is near the entrance to Rakituma / Preservation Inlet in Fiordland National Park. The lighthouse marks the northwest point of the entrance to Foveaux Strait, separating Stewart Island from the South Island. Puysegur Point is one of the most isolated and inaccessible lighthouses in New Zealand.

The original wooden lighthouse tower was destroyed in an arson attack on 8 February 1942. A replacement lighthouse was constructed using equipment that had recently become surplus from the Godley Head and Cape Foulwind lighthouses, and a new light was commissioned in January 1943.

== Background ==
Surveys of possible sites for lighthouses around Foveaux Strait were undertaken in 1874 from the vessel PS Luna. Sites visited included Cape Puysegur, Centre Island, Rugged Island, Green Islands, and Cape Windsor. Puysegur Point was identified as a potentially suitable site because of the elevation, the visibility from vessels en route to Otago or Canterbury from the west, and the accessibility.

== The first lighthouse ==
Lighthouse equipment for Puysegur Point was ordered in February 1875 as part of a larger contract awarded by the Commissioner of Customs for the supply of apparatus and lanterns for six lighthouses around the New Zealand coast. Site works began that same year in levelling sites for houses, and for the construction of a 1.5-mile-long (2.4 km) road to the location of the lighthouse from the landing point at Otago Retreat in Preservation Inlet. The Otago Retreat landing point had been previously established by prospectors exploring local coal deposits.

Land was formally reserved for the lighthouse late in 1875. The estimated cost of constructing the lighthouse was reported as £8,500. In December 1876, the Marine Office called for tenders for the construction of a lighthouse, dwellings and other buildings. Materials for the construction were brought ashore at the landing point at Otago Retreat. The main site construction works were completed by 1878. In the financial year 1877–78, the Marine Department spent £3,418 on works at Puysegur Point.

The tower was of wooden construction 40 feet (12 m) high, painted white. The lighthouse was fitted with a first order lens and the light, flashing every 10 seconds, was first shown on 1 March 1879. The focal height was 180 feet (55 m) above sea level, with a range of 19 nautical miles (35 km; 22 mi).

The tower was found to sway in the extreme winds often experienced at Puysegur Point. In 1886, the tower was strengthened with the addition of four guy-wires, fixed to ground anchors.

The Puysegur Point light was upgraded to the Chance incandescent system in 1909, providing an improved light with reduced consumption of oil.

== Communications ==
Despite being built on the mainland, rather than an offshore island, Puysegur Point is one of the most isolated and inaccessible lighthouse locations in New Zealand.

In 1896, surveys began for a telegraph line route from Puysegur Point to Orepuki in Southland, to provide communications from the site. Following the stranding of the vessel Ruapehu on Farewell Spit in 1897, commentators noted that several lighthouses around the coast, including Puysegur Point, did not have telegraph communications for promptly summoning assistance for vessels in distress. However, in 1899, homing pigeons were still being used to carry messages from Puysegur Point back to Invercargill.

A government decision to provide telegraph communications with the lighthouse was finally made in 1908. Telegraph communications from the site were used to summon assistance in 1910, following the wreck of the Waikare in Dusky Sound. However, the telegraph line proved difficult to maintain, and by the 1920s it was replaced by a radio-telephone system.

The lighthouse received stores and mail in monthly supply visits from government steamers, including the Stella in 1886, the Invercargill in 1895, and the GSS Wairua in the 1940s. Lighthouse keepers complained about the lack of a regular mail service. There was no reliable and regular mail service provided until 1941 when a two-weekly service from Riverton was commenced, subject to weather conditions.

== Destruction by arson ==
On Sunday 8 February 1942, the lighthouse was burned down by a man who had been prospecting on nearby Coal Island for six months, and who visited the lighthouse periodically to pick up stores left for him by the lighthouse supply vessel. It was subsequently reported that the man was infuriated by the flashing light from the lighthouse disturbing his sleep. He assaulted the lighthouse keeper on duty, knocking him unconscious, smashed the radio telephone and set fire to the lighthouse. After the assault and arson, he stole a rifle and ammunition and returned to Coal Island, but became marooned there when other lighthouse keepers took his boat from the island. The lighthouse keepers were able to restore radio communications and summoned help from Bluff. Police arrived and arrested the man the following day. The man was subsequently detained in a mental institution.

== Replacement lighthouse ==
A replacement lighthouse at Puysegur Point was established in January 1943. It was constructed on a short concrete foundation and used a lantern room that was previously in service at the Godley Head lighthouse, but had become surplus following a relocation of that lighthouse in 1942. Lenses previously installed in the lighthouse at Cape Foulwind were re-used and put into service.

A radio beacon was installed at Puysegur Point in 1947 as an additional navigation aid.

In August 1980, the Puysegur Point lighthouse was replaced with two automatic lights located at Windsor Point, to the southeast of Puysegur Point, and Cape Providence at the northern entrance to Chalky Inlet. However, in 1987 the Windsor Point light was shut down, and the Puysegur Point light was re-established.

The Puysegur Point lighthouse was equipped with a solar power supply in 1989, and permanent lighthouse keepers left the site for the last time.

== Incidents ==
- In September 1877, two carpenters engaged in construction work at Puysegur Point died while attempting to row across to Coal Island. They had observed what they thought was smoke coming from the island, and assumed this was a sign of people who had been ship-wrecked. The two men set off in strong winds and heavy seas. Their boat was eventually located washed up on an island, but the men's bodies were never found.
- On 28 November 1898, the lighthouse was struck by lightning but suffered only minor damage.
- In January 1910, news of the wreck of the vessel Waikare in Dusky Sound was sent to Puysegur Point Lighthouse over 30 miles away so that help could summoned.
- In July 1934, the radio receiver at the lighthouse was damaged beyond repair in a lightning strike.
- On 8 February 1942, the original wooden tower was destroyed by fire in an arson attack.
- In June 1942, heavy iron girders intended for construction work on the replacement Puysegur Point lighthouse were lost when the vessel carrying them was wrecked.
- On 23 November 1959, winds of hurricane strength up to 167 miles per hour (269 km/h) caused damage to a boathouse, a coal hut and a radio transmitter building at Puysegur Point. Extreme winds were also recorded on 22 December 1960, with gusts over 120 miles per hour (190 km/h).

== Depiction on postage stamps ==
The Puysegur Point Lighthouse was featured on a postage stamp as part of the commemoration of the centenary of the New Zealand Government Life Insurance Office in 1969. It was initially issued in 1969 as a 2½ cent stamp, but was overprinted and re-issued as a 25 cent stamp in 1978.
