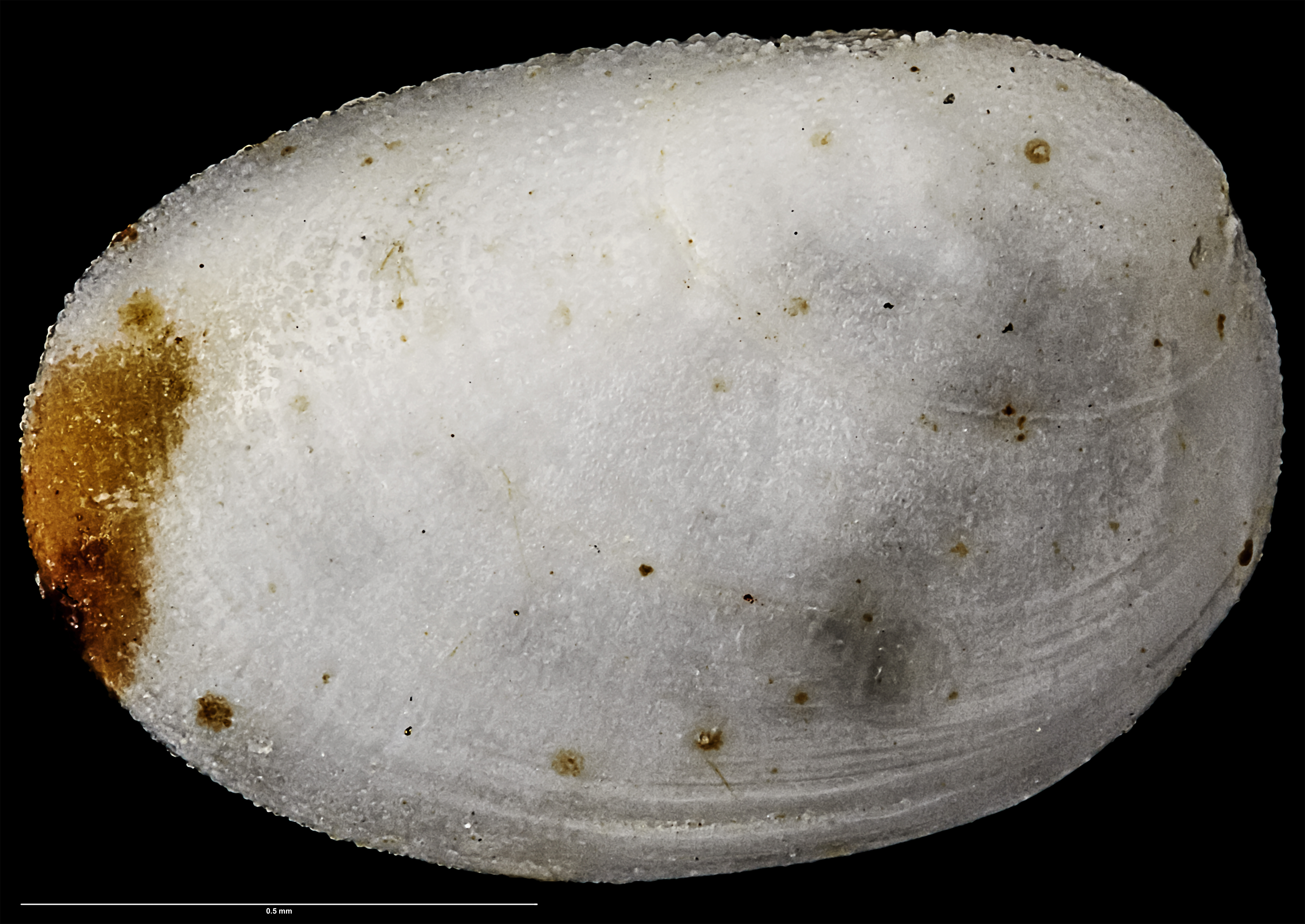
- Holotype from Auckland War Memorial Museum

Scientific classification
- Kingdom: Animalia
- Phylum: Mollusca
- Class: Bivalvia
- Order: Venerida
- Family: Neoleptonidae
- Genus: Puyseguria
- Species: P. wanganuica

Binomial name
- Puyseguria wanganuica A. W. B. Powell, 1931

Synonyms
- Puysegeria wanganuica A. W. B. Powell, 1931

= Puyseguria wanganuica =

Puyseguria wanganuica Temporal range: 3.00–Recent Ma

Species of bivalve

Puyseguria wanganuica is a species of bivalve, a marine mollusc in the family Neoleptonidae. Endemic to New Zealand and found in waters surrounding the coasts of the mainland up to a depth of 180 m (590 ft), fossils of the species have been found to date back to the Pliocene.

== Description ==
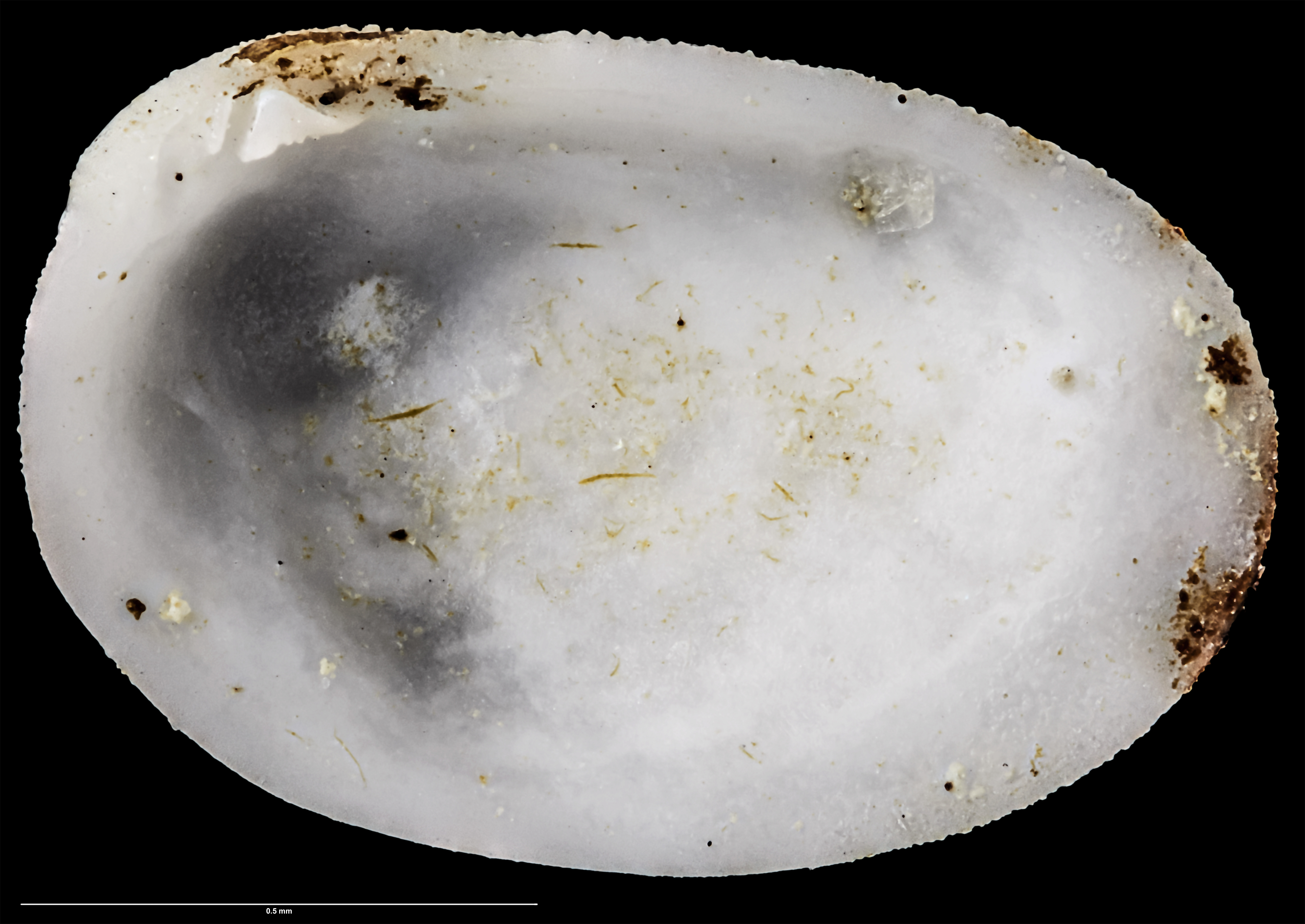
Inside view of holotype

In the original description, Powell described the species as follows:

The new species differs from [Puyseguria cuneata] in being slightly longer and more oblong, with a straighten dorsal margin. The most striking difference, however, is in the shape of the cardinal of the left valve. This is broadly triangular, with the anterior side produced along the hinge-plate and only a faint suggestion of bifurcation. In cuneata, this cardinal of the left valve differs in being definitely bifid and narrowly triangular without the anteriorly produced side. Surface smooth and polished.

The holotype of the species has an estimated height of 1.2 mm (0.047 in), and a length of 0.8 mm (0.031 in) for a single valve.

== Taxonomy ==
The species was first described by A. W. B. Powell in 1931, using the spelling Puysegeria wanganuica. The current accepted name is Puyseguria wanganuica. Powell believed that the species was a fossil species, and the direct ancestor of P. cuneata. The holotype was collected in January 1931 from Castlecliff, Whanganui, and is held in the collections of Auckland War Memorial Museum.

== Distribution and habitat ==
The species is endemic to New Zealand, found in the waters surrounding the North Island, South Island and Stewart Island at a depth ranging between 0–180 m (0–591 ft). Fossils of this species found in New Zealand date back to the Mangapanian stage of the Pliocene (3 million years ago), and have been found near Whanganui and Nukumaru near Waitōtara, South Taranaki.
