= Grey River =

Grey River may refer to:

- Grey River (New Zealand), a major river in the west of New Zealand's South Island.
- Grey River (Victoria), Australia
- Grey River, Newfoundland and Labrador, Canada
- Grey River (Chile)

== See also ==
- Little Grey River, a tributary of the Grey River, in New Zealand
- Gray River, Fiordland, New Zealand
- Greys River, a tributary of the Snake River, in the United States
