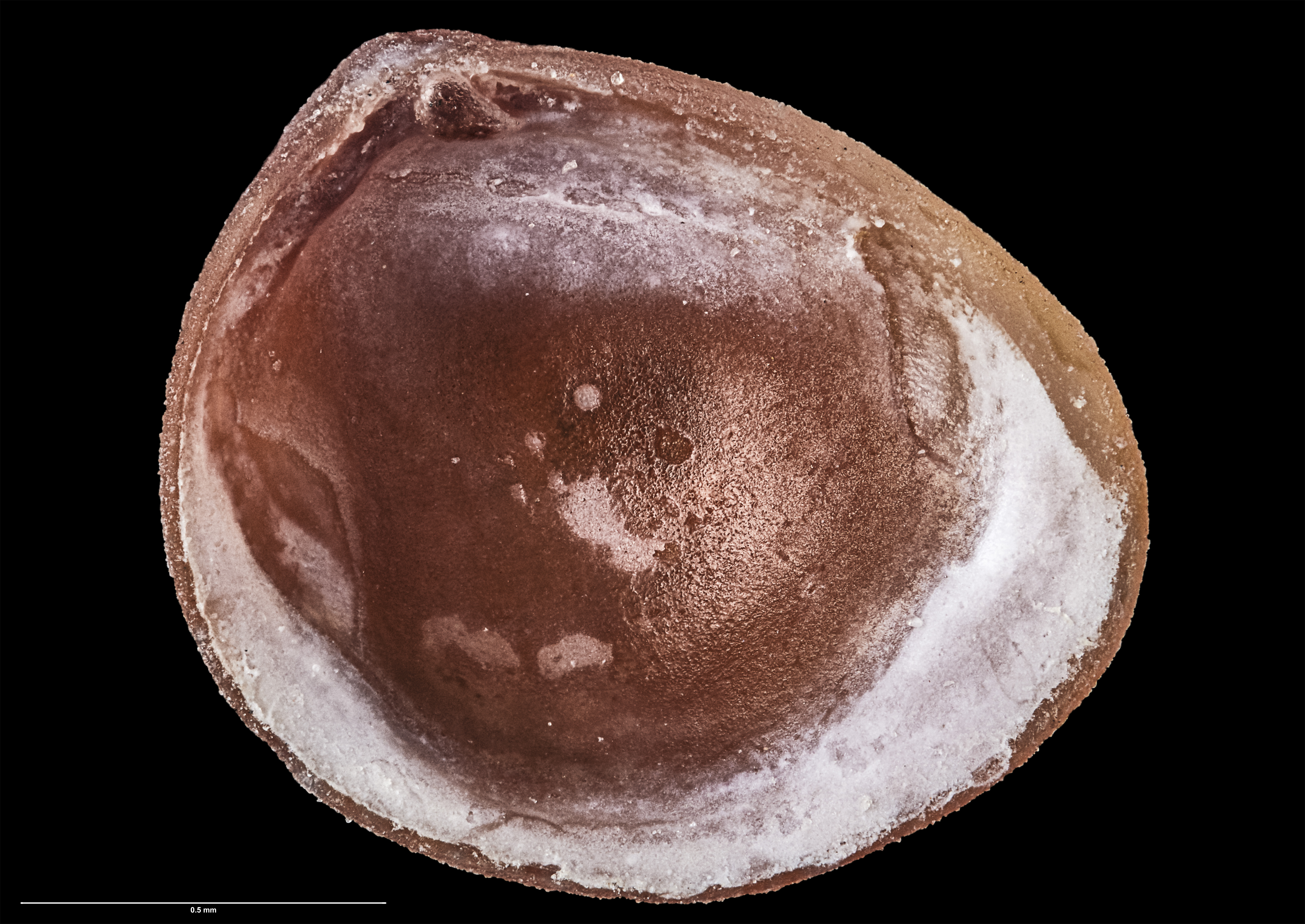
- Puyseguria tani

Scientific classification
- Kingdom: Animalia
- Phylum: Mollusca
- Class: Bivalvia
- Order: Venerida
- Superfamily: Veneroidea
- Family: Neoleptonidae
- Genus: Puyseguria; Powell, 1927

Type species
- Puyseguria cuneata Powell, 1927

Species
- See text.

Synonyms
- Puysegeria Powell, 1927

= Puyseguria =

Puyseguria Temporal range: 25.2–recent Ma

Genus of bivalves

Puyseguria is a genus of marine bivalve molluscs of the family Neoleptonidae. First appearing in the Oligocene fossil record of New Zealand, members of the genus are primarily found in New Zealand, with one living off the coasts of Australia, and undescribed members of the genus found in southern Argentina.

== Description ==
Members of the genus have a transversely-ovate shell which in small and inequilateral. Shells have low, rounded beaks near the posterior end of the shells. A long anterior lateral is found at the hings of the right valve, as well as a triangular (often bifid) cardinal.

== Taxonomy ==
The genus was first described in 1927 by Baden Powell, who named P. cuneata as the type species. The genus is named after Puysegur Point in Fiordland, and originally had the spelling Puysegeria, based on a misspelling of the point.

== Distribution ==
Members of Puyseguria are found in New Zealand, except for one species, P. chapmani, which is found in Australia. Additionally, undescribed members of the genus are known to occur in the waters of southern Argentina and the Scotia Arc.

Fossils of the species are found in New Zealand, and date back to the Waitakian stage of the Oligocene.

== Species ==
Species within the genus Puyseguria include:

- Puyseguria chapmani (Gatliff & Gabriel, 1912)
- † Puyseguria crenulifera P. A. Maxwell, 1969
- Puyseguria cuneata Powell, 1927
- Puyseguria prognata Powell, 1927
- Puyseguria tani Powell, 1939
- Puyseguria wanganuica A. W. B. Powell, 1931
