= Pachykellya =

Scientific classification
- Kingdom: Animalia
- Phylum: Mollusca
- Class: Bivalvia
- Order: Venerida
- Superfamily: Veneroidea
- Family: Neoleptonidae
- Genus: Pachykellya; Bernard, 1897

Species
- See text.

Genus of bivalves

Pachykellya is a genus of very small saltwater clams, marine bivalve molluscs in the family Neoleptonidae.

== Species ==
Species in the genus Pachykellya include:

- Pachykellya bernardi Powell, 1927
- Pachykellya concentrica Powell, 1927
- Pachykellya edwardsi Bernard, 1897
- Pachykellya minima Powell, 1931
- Pachykellya rotunda Powell, 1927
