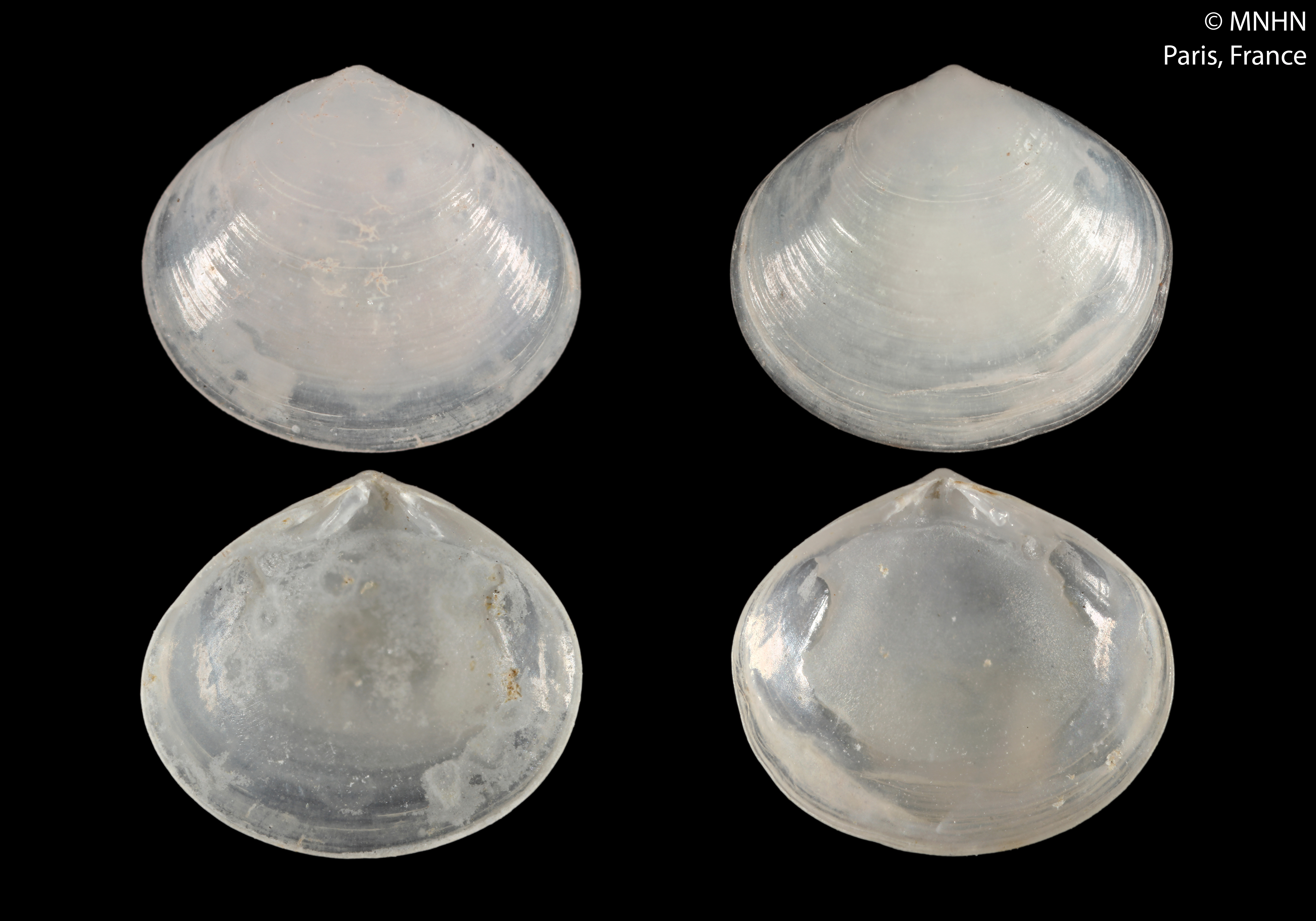
- Shell of Neolepton veneris (syntype at MNHN, Paris)

Scientific classification
- Kingdom: Animalia
- Phylum: Mollusca
- Class: Bivalvia
- Order: Venerida
- Superfamily: Veneroidea
- Family: Neoleptonidae
- Genus: Neolepton; Monterosato, 1875

Type species
- Lepton sulcatulum Jeffreys, 1859

Species
- See text.

Synonyms
- Davisia Cooper & Preston, 1910 (invalid: junior homonym of Davisia del Guercio, 1909 [Hemiptera]; Neodavisia is a replacement name); Halodakra Olsson, 1961; Neodavisia Chavan, 1969; Neolepton (Neolepton) Monterosato, 1875· accepted, alternate representation; Neolepton (Stohleria) Coan, 1984· accepted, alternate representation; Notolepton Finlay, 1926; Stohleria Coan, 1984

= Neolepton =

Genus of bivalves

Neolepton is a genus of marine bivalve molluscs of the family Neoleptonidae.

== Species in the genus Neolepton ==
- Neolepton amatoi Zelaya & Ituarte, 2004
- Neolepton antipodum (Filhol, 1880)
- Neolepton arjanbosi 2003
- Neolepton atlanticum 1890
- Neolepton benguelensis 1998
- Neolepton bonaerense 2004
- Neolepton caledonicum 1998
- Neolepton cancellatum 1998
- Neolepton cobbi 1910
- Neolepton concentricum 1912
- Neolepton discriminatum 2001
- Neolepton faberi 2003
- Neolepton falklandicum 1964
- Neolepton georgianum 2003
- Neolepton guanche 1998
- Neolepton holmbergi 2003
- Neolepton hupei 1957
- Neolepton moolenbeeki 2003
- Neolepton novacambricum 1915
- Neolepton peetersae 2003
- Neolepton planiliratum 1911
- Neolepton powelli Dell, 1964
- Neolepton profundorum 2000
- Neolepton sootryeni 1998
- Neolepton sublaevigatum Powell, 1937
- Neolepton subobliquum Powell, 1937
- Neolepton subtrigonum 1857
- Neolepton sulcatulum 1859
- Neolepton triangulare Dell, 1956
- Neolepton umbonatum 1885
- Neolepton veneris 1877
- Neolepton victor 2003
- Neolepton yagan 2004

Species Neolepton obliquatum Chaster, 1897 was accepted as Coracuta obliquata (Chaster, 1897).

Species Neolepton sykesi (Chaster, 1895) accepted as Arculus sykesii (Chaster, 1895).
