= Cape Foulwind =

Headland on the South Island of New Zealand

- Cape
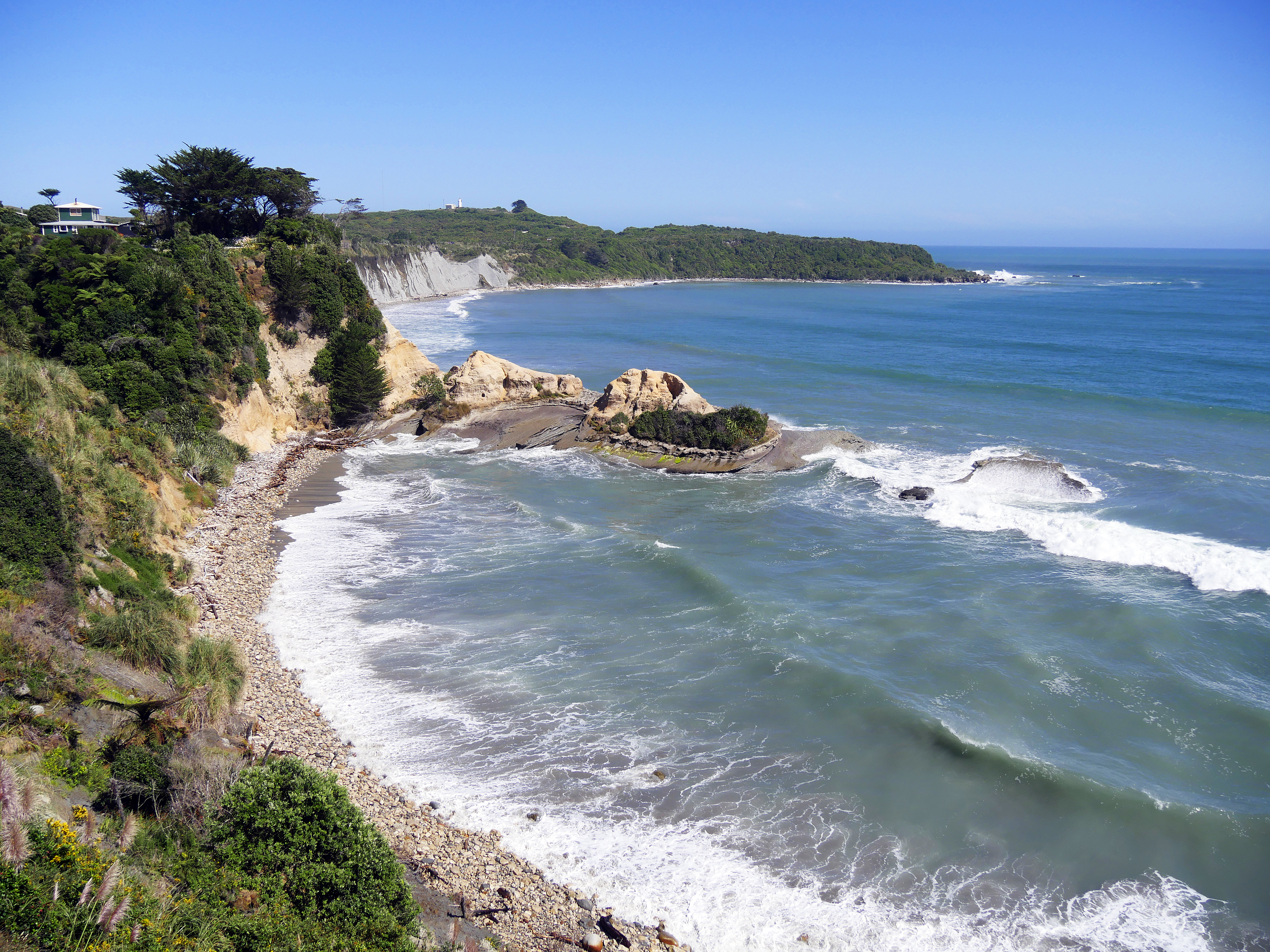
- Looking west across Gibsons Beach to Cape Foulwind

- Location within New Zealand
- Coordinates: 41°44′57″S 171°27′51″E
- Water bodies: Tasman Sea
- Formed by: Erosion
- Geology: Gneiss

Cape Foulwind is a headland on the West Coast of the South Island of New Zealand, overlooking the Tasman Sea. It is located 11 kilometres (6.8 mi) west of the town of Westport. There is a lighthouse located on a prominent site on the headland. A walkway beginning at the lighthouse carpark traverses the rocky headland to Tauranga Bay and passes close by a colony of New Zealand fur seals. There is limestone quarry in the area, and a cement works operated nearby from 1958 to 2016.

In the lee of the cape, eastwards toward the Buller River mouth, lies Carters Beach, which is claimed to be the only safe swimming beach on the West Coast of the South Island.

== Toponymy ==
The headland was initially named Rocky Cape by Abel Tasman, the first European to sight it, in 1642. However, the current name, Cape Foulwind, was given by English explorer James Cook in 1770 after his ship Endeavour, was blown quite a distance offshore from this point.

== Lighthouse ==
The first lighthouse at Cape Foulwind was illuminated on 1 September 1876. However, the timber support structure of this initial lighthouse did not survive the environmental conditions. Consequently, a replacement lighthouse was erected on a concrete tower in 1926. Operated by Maritime New Zealand, the lighthouse is registered as a Category 2 Historic Place.

== Walkway ==
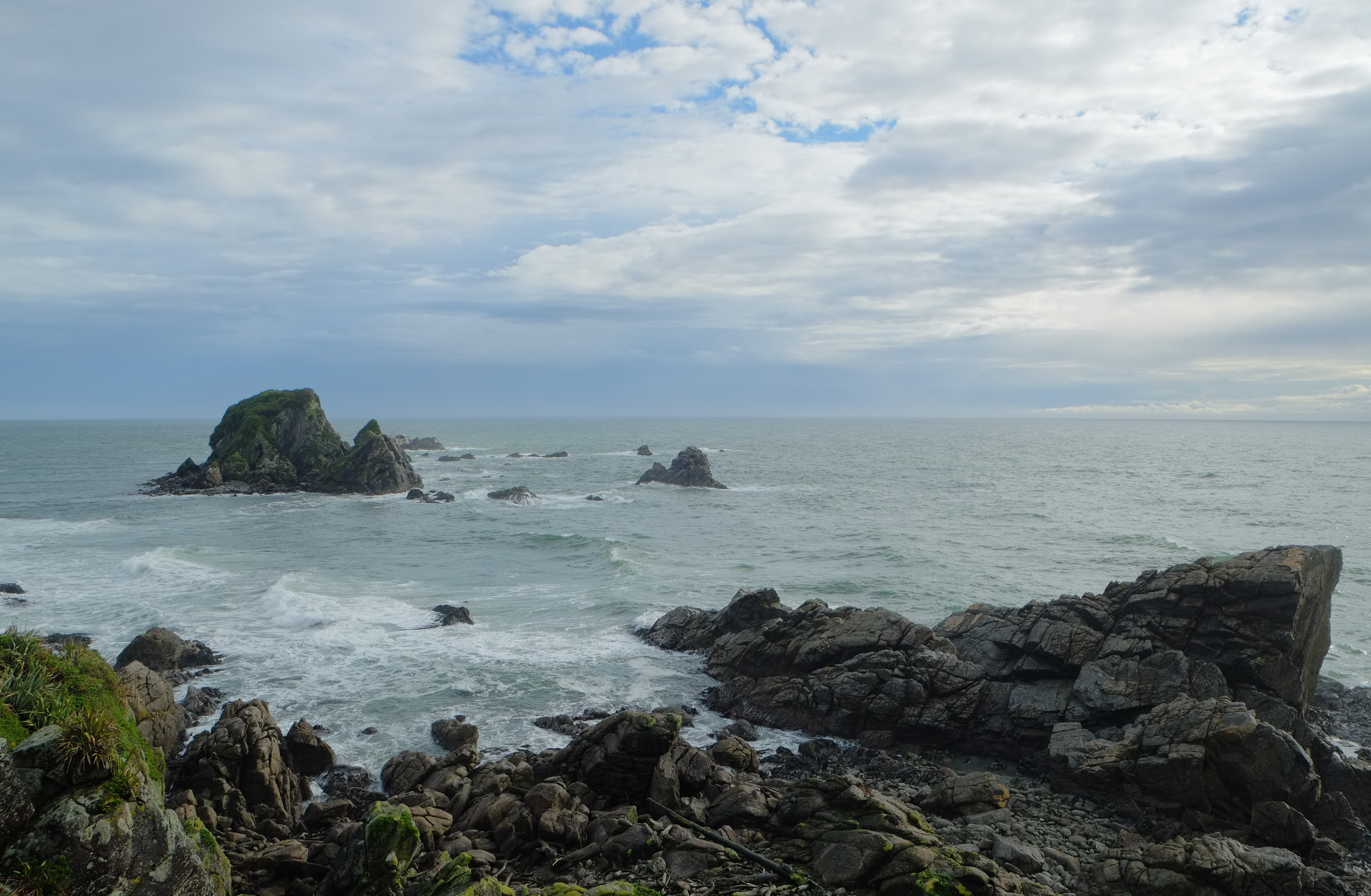
View over Cape Foulwind seal colony

The Cape Foulwind Walkway is a 3.4 kilometres (2.1 mi) (one-way) path situated above rocky headlands, extending from Tauranga Bay to the carpark at the Cape Foulwind Lighthouse. Notable features of the walkway encompass views of mountains and coastline, a thriving colony of New Zealand fur seals (kekeno), and the lighthouse. The cliffs of Cape Foulwind, along with the adjacent small offshore islands, serve as roosting and breeding grounds for various seabird species, such as Australasian gannets. sooty shearwaters, fluttering shearwaters and fairy prions. Wall island, a small rocky islet, offshore from the seal colony at Tauranga Bay, plays a vital role as habitat for seabird colonies and Little penguins (kororā). Additionally, there is a chance to occasionally spot Hector's dolphin and orcas from the walkway.

== Demographics ==
Cape Foulwind and its surrounds cover 52.33 km^{2} (20.20 sq mi). It is part of the larger Charleston statistical area.

Historical population
Year	Pop.	±% p.a.
2006	129	—
2013	153	+2.47%
2018	126	−3.81%
2023	168	+5.92%

The area had a population of 168 in the 2023 New Zealand census, an increase of 42 people (33.3%) since the 2018 census, and an increase of 15 people (9.8%) since the 2013 census. There were 84 males, 81 females, and 3 people of other genders in 78 dwellings. 5.4% of people identified as LGBTIQ+. The median age was 46.3 years (compared with 38.1 years nationally). There were 30 people (17.9%) aged under 15 years, 18 (10.7%) aged 15 to 29, 84 (50.0%) aged 30 to 64, and 36 (21.4%) aged 65 or older.

People could identify as more than one ethnicity. The results were 89.3% European (Pākehā), 12.5% Māori, 5.4% Asian, and 3.6% other, which includes people giving their ethnicity as "New Zealander". English was spoken by 98.2%, and other languages by 5.4%. No language could be spoken by 1.8% (e.g. too young to talk). The percentage of people born overseas was 19.6, compared with 28.8% nationally.

Religious affiliations were 33.9% Christian and 1.8% other religions. People who answered that they had no religion were 58.9%, and 7.1% of people did not answer the census question.

Of those at least 15 years old, 24 (17.4%) people had a bachelor's or higher degree, 90 (65.2%) had a post-high school certificate or diploma, and 30 (21.7%) people exclusively held high school qualifications. The median income was $36,600, compared with $41,500 nationally. 12 people (8.7%) earned over $100,000 compared to 12.1% nationally. The employment status of those at least 15 was 63 (45.7%) full-time, 30 (21.7%) part-time, and 6 (4.3%) unemployed.

== Cement works ==
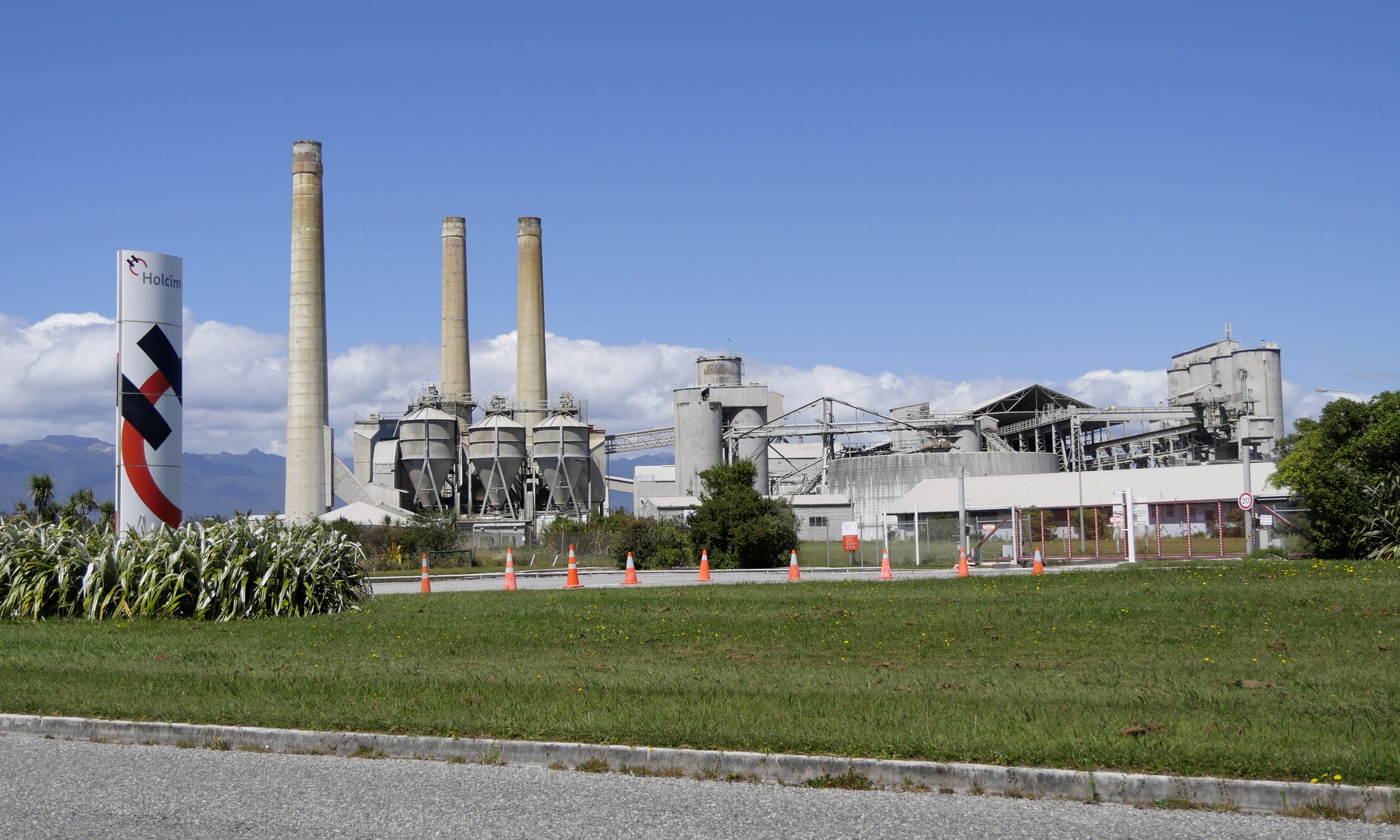
Cement works in 2017, after closure

In 1924, the Grey River Argus reported that the National Portland Cement Company was to be floated, to mine and process deposits of limestone and marl at Cape Foulwind. A proposal to establish a cement works at Cape Foulwind was announced in 1946. In 1953, it was reported that British interests had purchased a large area of land at Cape Foulwind. However, it was not until 1955 that the British company Tunnel Portland Cement (subsequently Hanson Cement) made a firm commitment to construct a plant. The plant, with an expected production capability of 120,000 tons per annum, was set to employ 200 workers and utilise 40,000 tonnes of Buller coal annually. The capital required for the plant would be £2,500,000, with only £100,000 to be raised in New Zealand.

The new plant at Cape Foulwind commenced production in November 1958, and its official opening took place on 15 February 1959.

In 2013, Holcim, the owner, announced plans to close the factory and cease cement production in New Zealand. The Cape Foulwind cement works ceased operations in June 2016 after 58 years, resulting in the loss of 105 jobs.

== Mineral sands mining ==
In May 2022, Westland Mineral Sands, a mining company, was granted resource consent by a joint hearings panel of the West Coast Regional Council and Buller District Council for a proposal to mine 500,000 tonnes of mineral sands over seven years, at its property at Okari, south of Cape Foulwind. A group of local residents appealed the decision of the hearings panel in the Environment Court, seeking lower noise level limits and more restrictions on operating hours.

The mining of mineral sands was projected to begin in October 2022, with 2 hectares (4.9 acres) to be strip-mined at a time.

== Railway line ==
The Cape Foulwind Railway was a branch railway line built in 1886 by the Westport Harbour Board, to transport rocks from their quarry to the breakwaters in the Buller River.

== Three Steeples Rocks and Black Reef ==
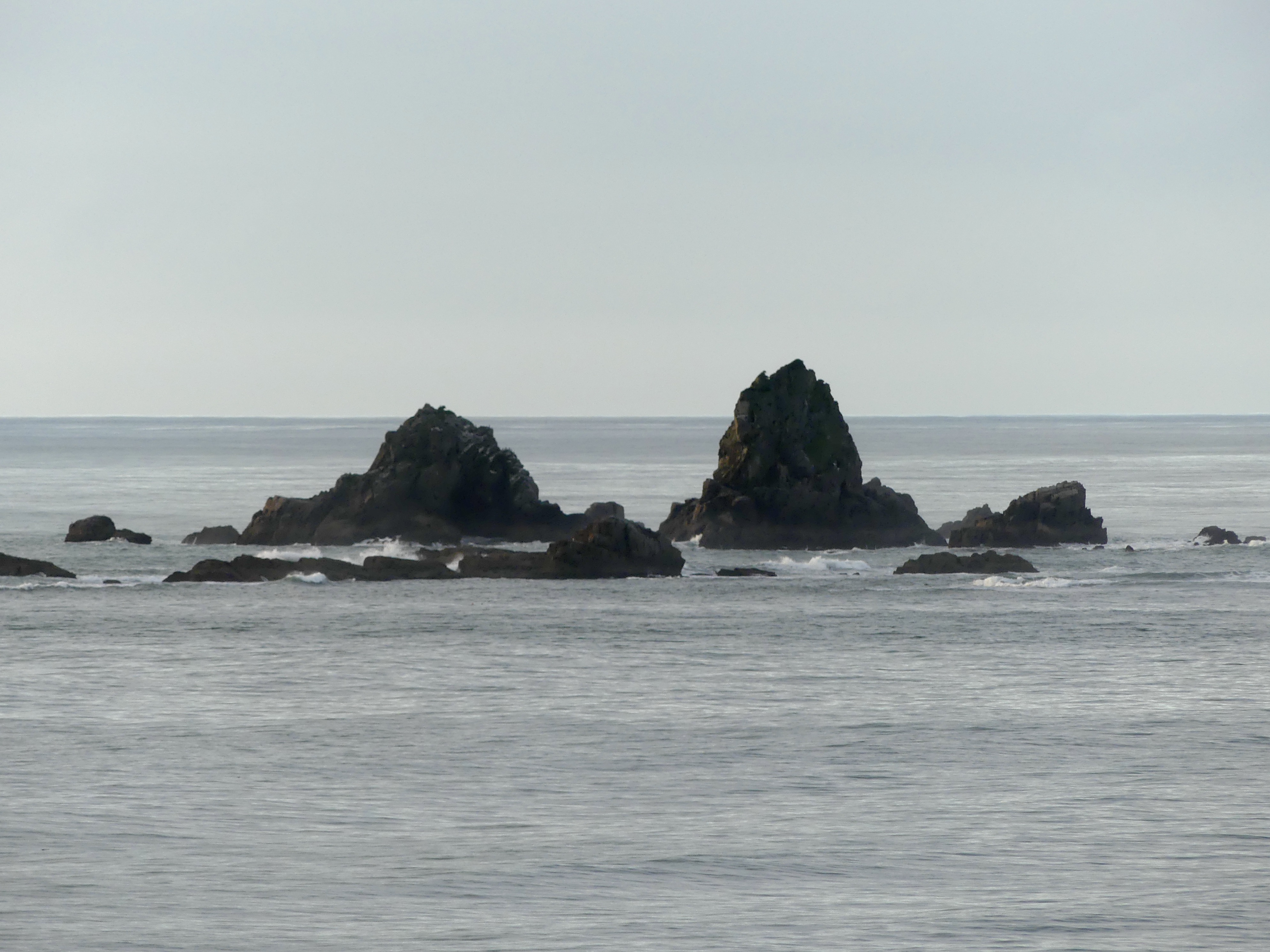
Three Steeples rocks in 2020

The Three Steeples and Black Reef are 28 rocky islets, rising to a bit over 20 m (66 ft) high, approximately 2 km (1.2 mi) north of Cape Foulwind. They are granite rocks, named by Jules Dumont d'Urville as Les Trois Cloches on 12 January 1827 and depicted as Three Steeples on James Wyld's 1839 map. They had been known to sealers as Black Rocks since at least 1826. Patrick O'Regan thought these were the rocks illustrated by Isaack Gilsemans, when Tasman first anchored in New Zealand waters on 14 December 1642. The Dutch inscription beneath the drawings has been translated as the Rocky Point.

The lighthouse has proven effective, with no recorded wrecks on the rocks. However, in 1881, the Anchor Shipping and Foundry Company's paddle steamer Charles Edward (1864–1908) was holed and then towed to Westport. Similarly, in 1946, the Union Steamship's collier, Karepo, stranded on the rocks in a thick fog, but was later floated off. A navigable channel, about 1/4 mi (0.40 km) wide, runs between the Cape and Black Reef.

Spotted shags roost on the Steeples, where salt-resistant taupata grows on the rock tops.

Rock lobster (kōura), blue cod (rāwaru), gurnard (kumukumu), sharks and snapper (tāmure) are fished around the rocks and orca probably feed off the fur seal colonies. The shellfish Cantharidus puysegurensis and Leptomya retiaria have been found on the rocks.

== Gallery ==
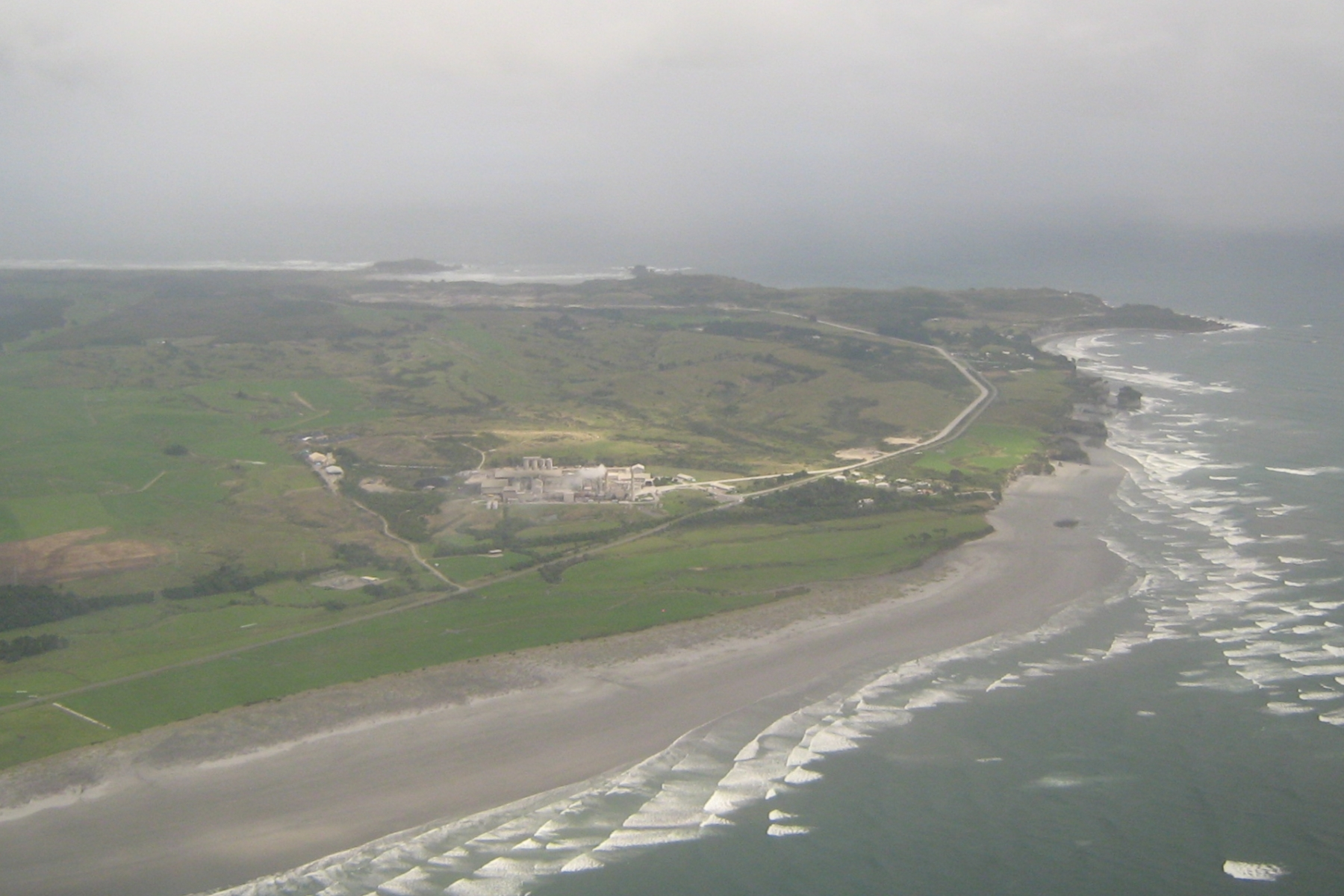
Cape Foulwind living up to its name, with the cement works centre foreground.

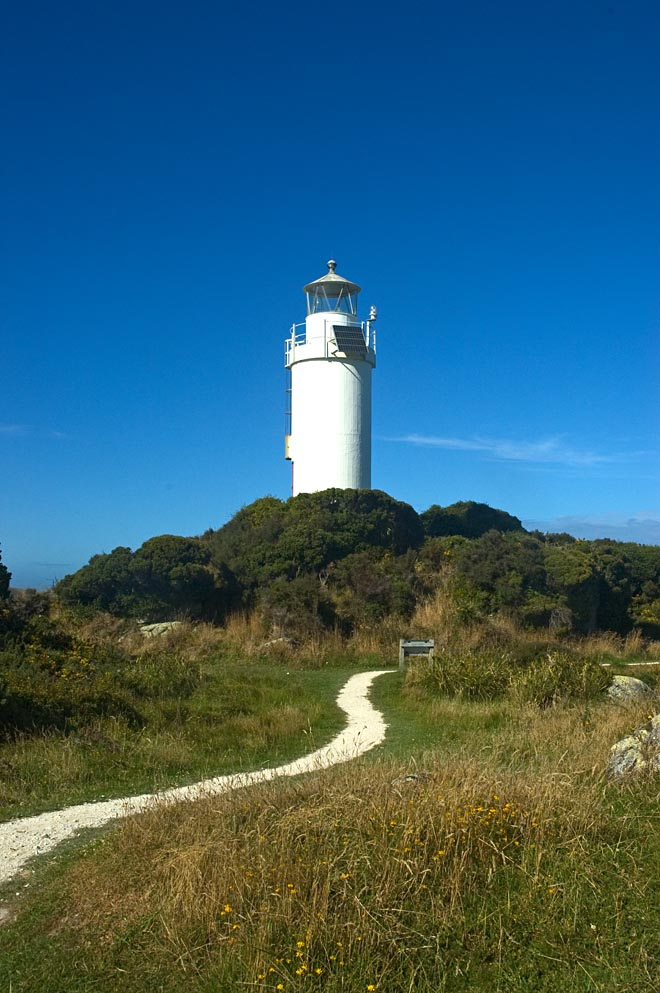
The lighthouse at Cape Foulwind

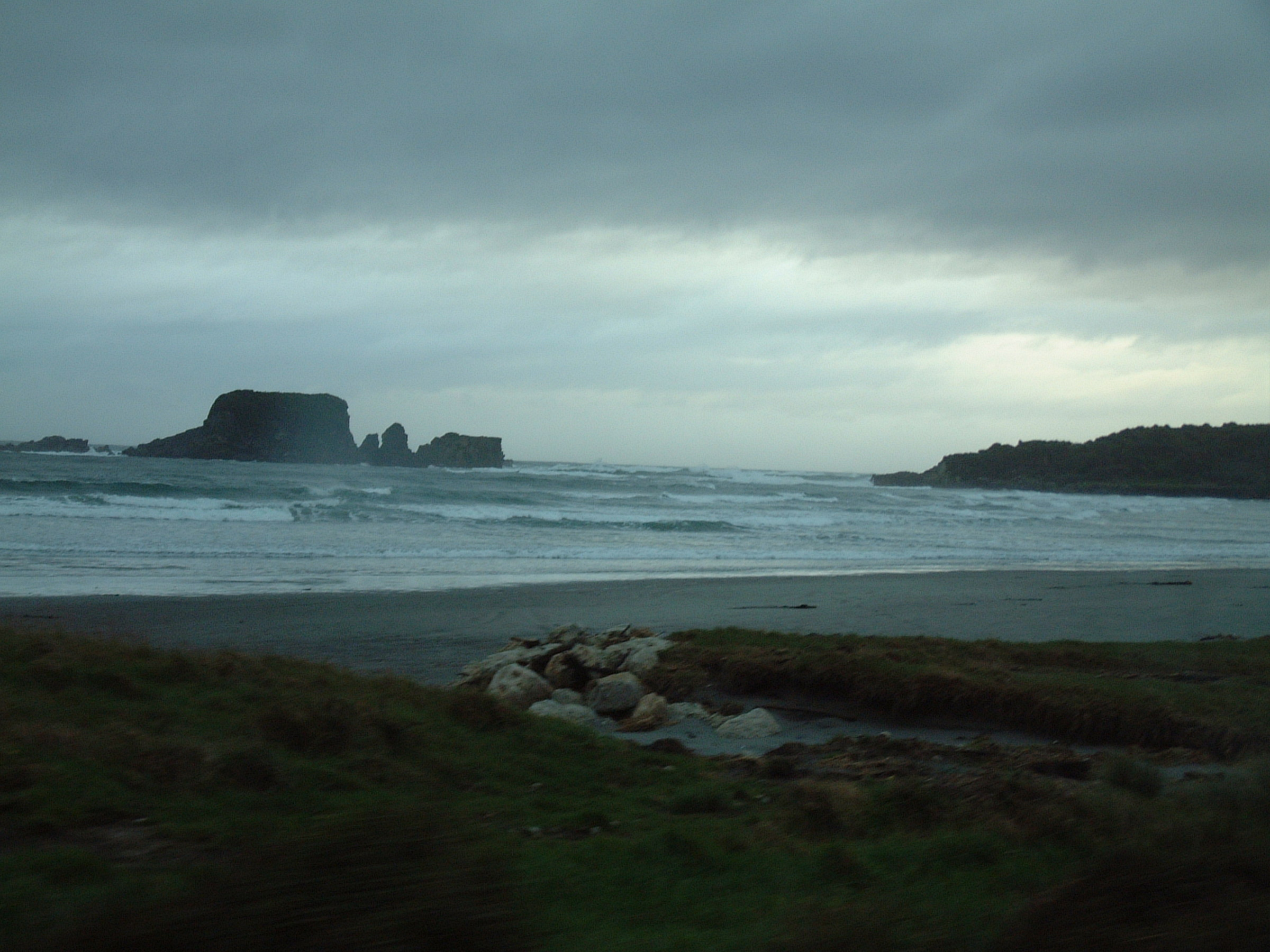
Cape Foulwind: Looking out on the Tasman Sea
