= Neoleptonidae =

Scientific classification
- Kingdom: Animalia
- Phylum: Mollusca
- Class: Bivalvia
- Order: Venerida
- Superfamily: Veneroidea
- Family: Neoleptonidae; Thiele, 1934

Species
- See text.

Family of bivalves

Neoleptonidae is a family of marine bivalve clams of the order Venerida.

== Genera in the family Neoleptonidae ==
- Arculus Monterosato, 1909
- Bernardina Dall, 1910
- Epilepton Dall, 1899
- Halodakra Olsson, 1961
- Neolepton Finley, 1926
- Pachykellya Bernard, 1897
- Puyseguria Powell, 1927
