= Cape Foulwind Lighthouse =

Lighthouse on New Zealand's South Island

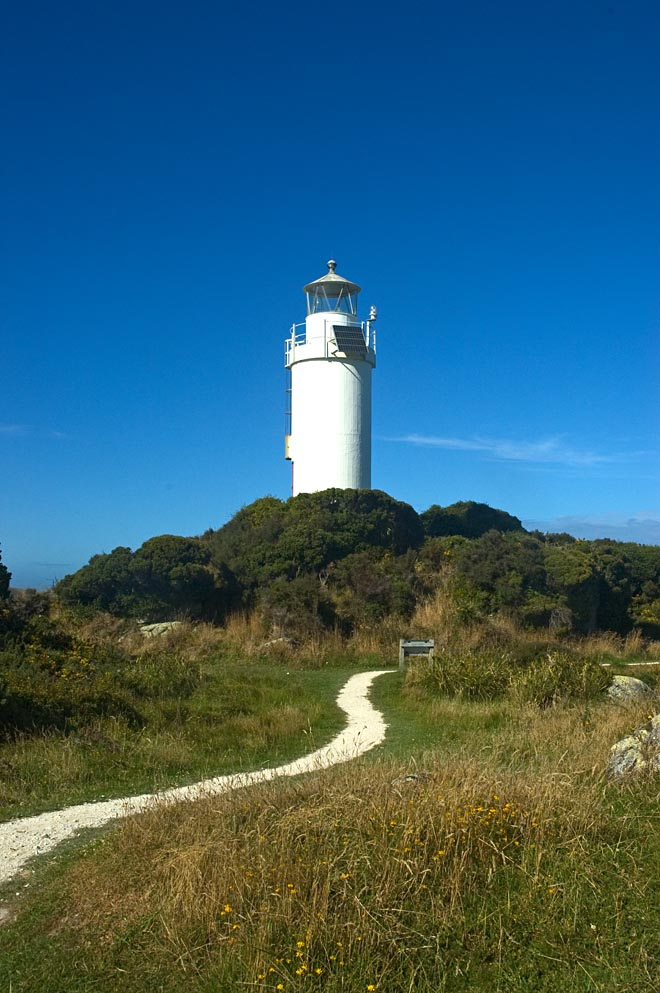
- Location: Cape Foulwind, New Zealand
- Coordinates: 41°45′S 171°28′E

Tower
- Constructed: 1876
- Construction: Concrete tower
- Automated: 1926
- Height: 9 metres (30 ft)
- Power source: solar power

Light
- First lit: 1876
- Focal height: 70 metres (230 ft)
- Light source: LED
- Range: 10 nautical miles (19 km; 12 mi)
- Characteristic: Flashes white once every 12 seconds

Heritage New Zealand – Category 2
- Designated: 21 September 1989
- Reference no.: 5023

The Cape Foulwind Lighthouse is a lighthouse that is located at Cape Foulwind, 11 km (7 mi) west of the town of Westport on the West Coast of New Zealand's South Island. Perched 70 metres (230 ft) above the Tasman Sea, the light guides vessels along the Buller coast, and is one of the most accessible lighthouses in the country. The LED light flashes white once every 12 seconds and has a range 10 nautical miles (19 km; 12 mi). It is a Category 2 heritage listed structure.

== History ==
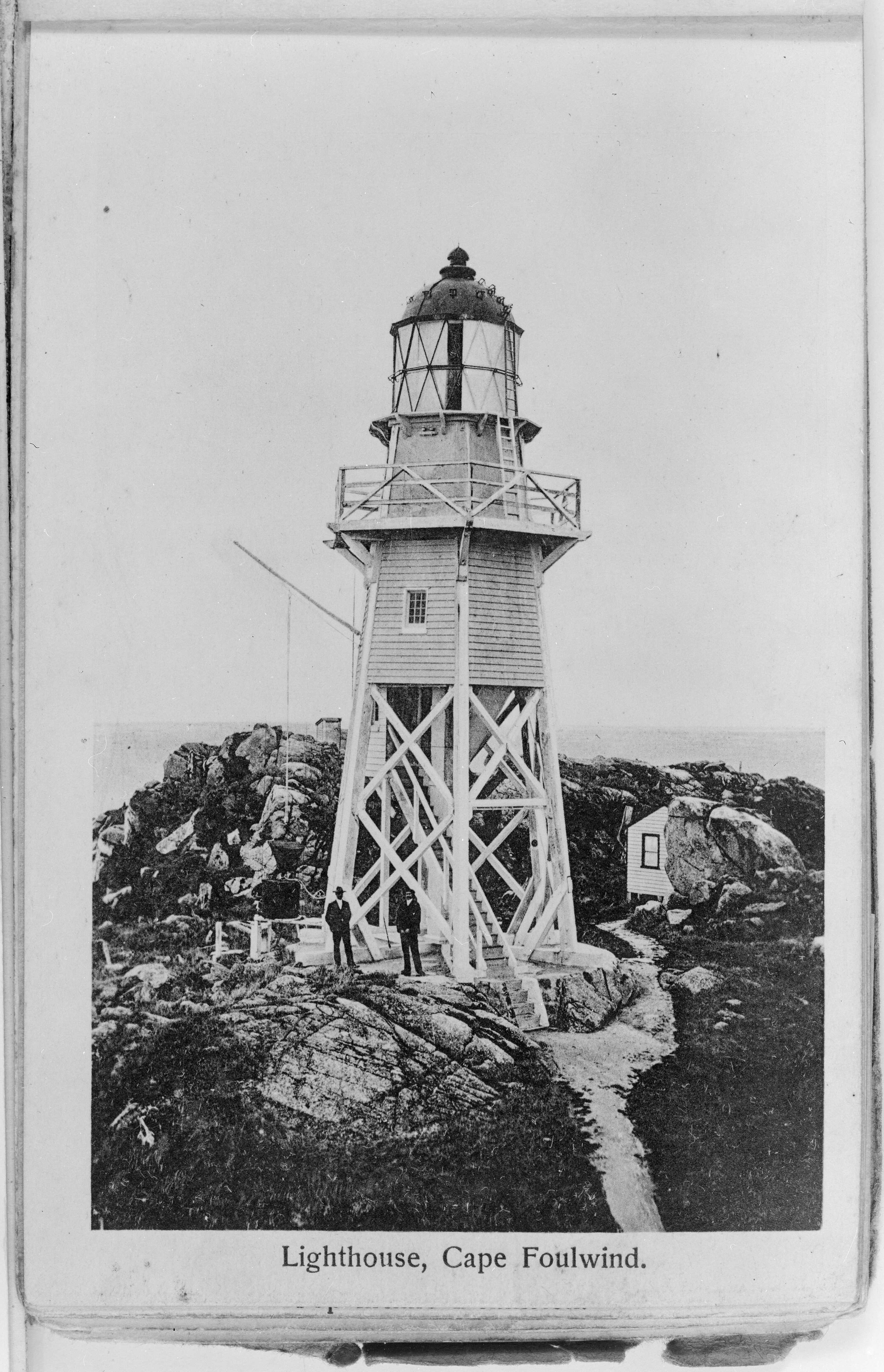
Original Cape Foulwind Lighthouse

The need for a lighthouse was identified during the goldrush era; however, it was not until 1 September 1876 that the light was first lit. The original hexagonal tower was built of rimu. It suffered from rot, and was replaced in 1926 by the present concrete tower with an automated light, which is now operated remotely from Maritime New Zealand's Wellington office. Traces of foundations of the old tower and the keeper's houses can still be seen.

== Access ==
The lighthouse is an 11-kilometre (6.8 mi) drive west from the town of Westport and a ten-minute walk from the northern end of the Cape Foulwind walkway. The circular walkway goes past the lighthouse, and on to the New Zealand Fur Seal colony at Tauranga Bay, with views back to the lighthouse. Entry into the lighthouse structure itself is not permitted.

== Operations ==
The lighthouse is operated by the Maritime New Zealand, it is registered under the international Admiralty number K4486 and it has the NGA identifier of 111–5600. With a focal height of 70 metres (230 ft) above sea level, the light can be seen for 10 nautical miles. Its characteristic is a white flash every twelve seconds, originally fitted with a Fresnel optic, it now uses an LED system fixed to the gallery railing.

== Gallery ==
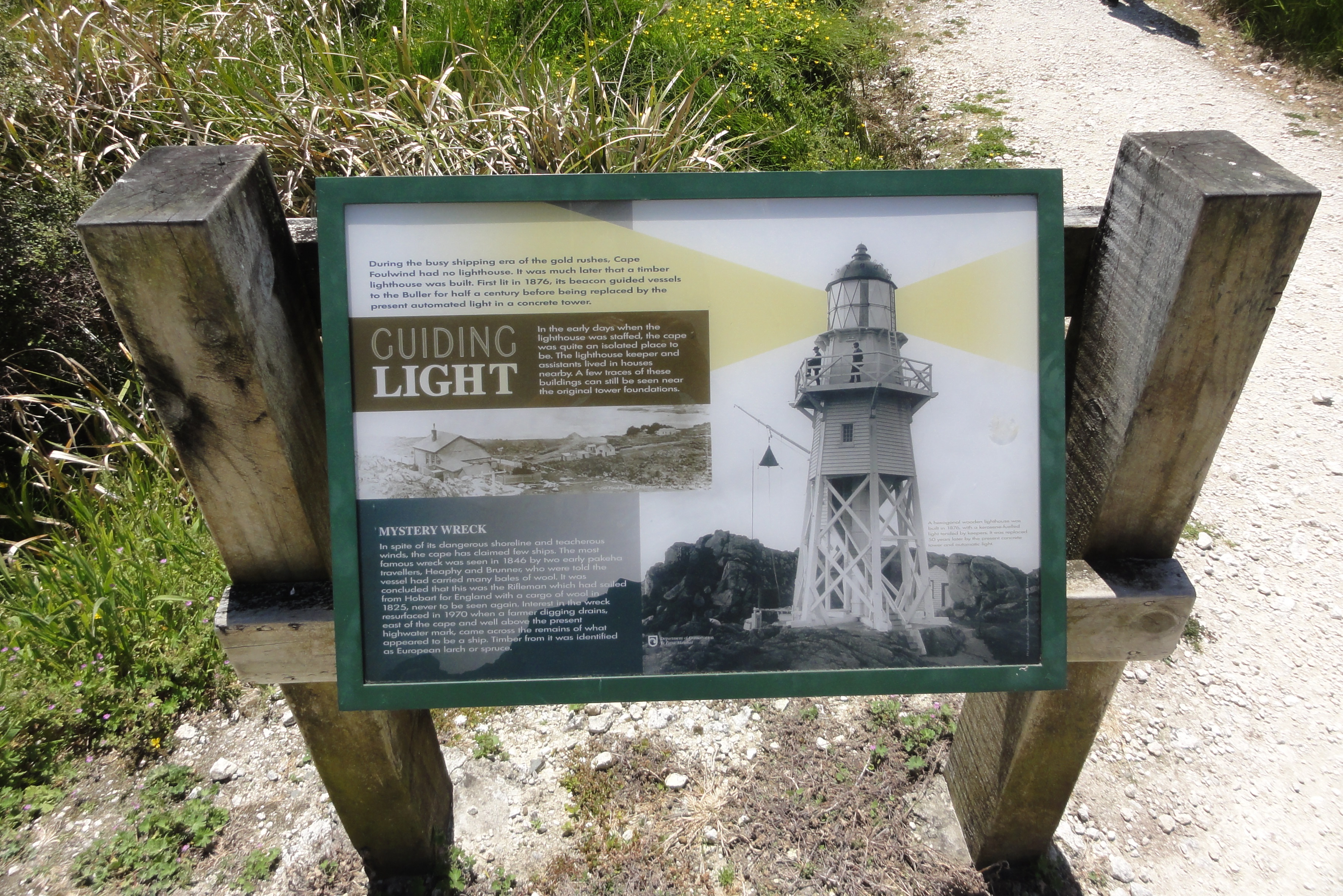
Interpretive sign on the walkway

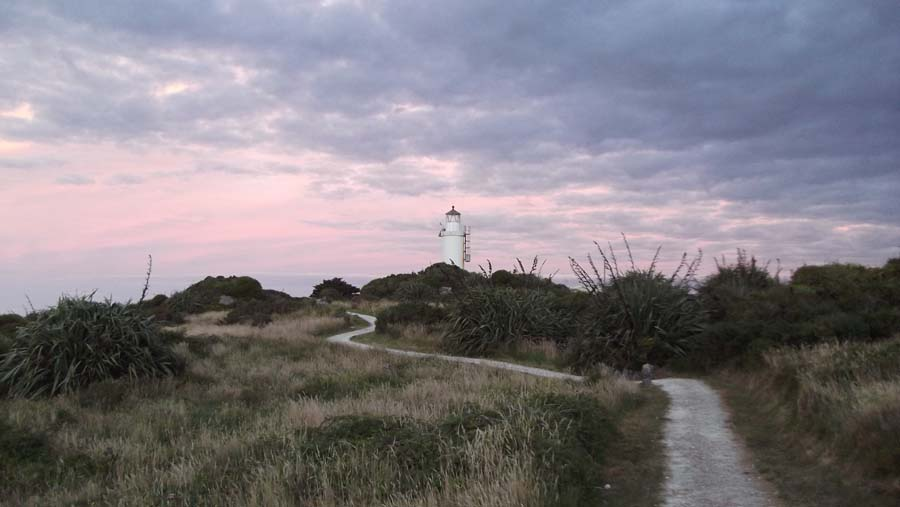
Sunset over the lighthouse

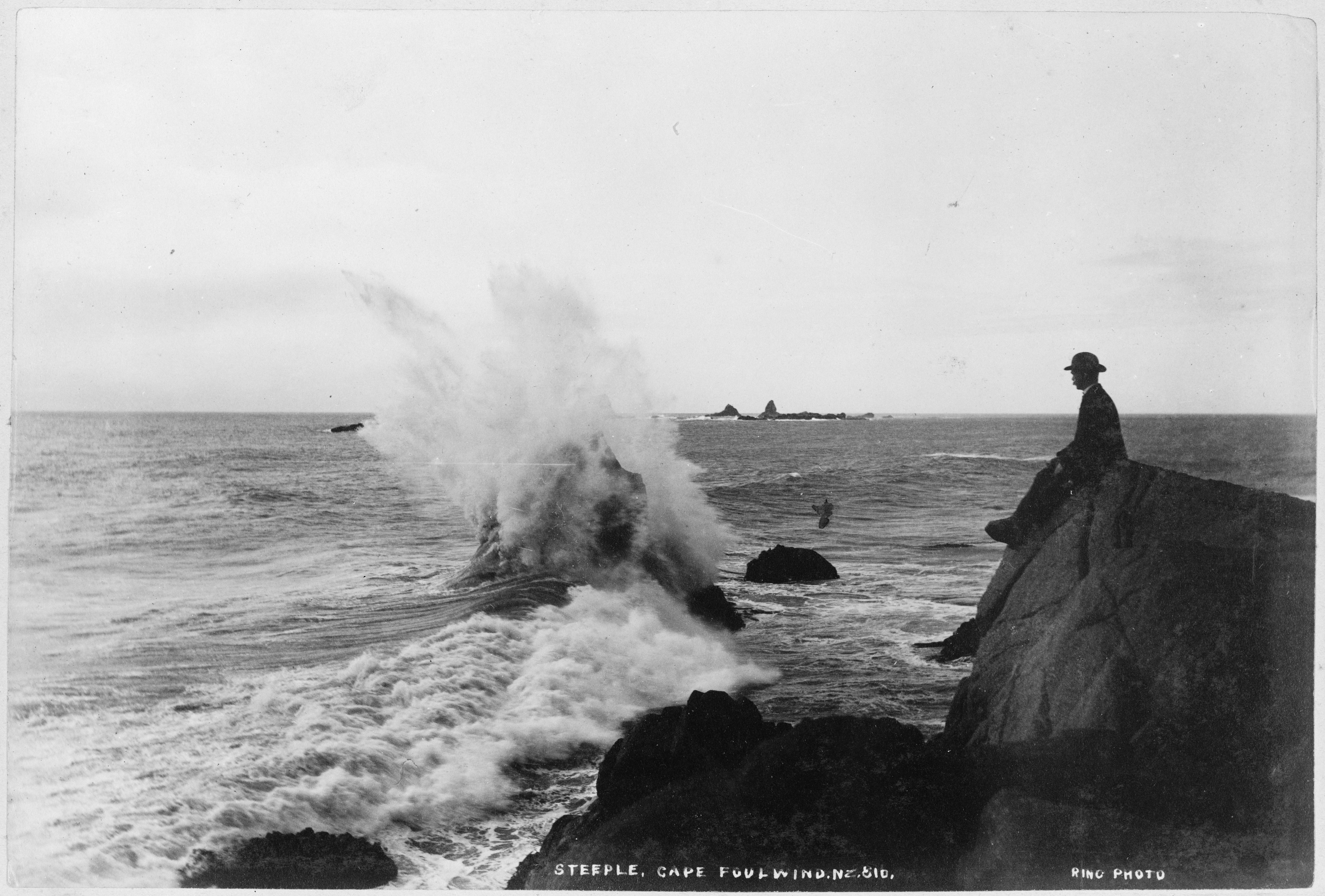
Between 1879 and 1929
