= Murray River (New Zealand) =

Coordinates: 46.781583°S 167.997527°E

Location
- Country: New Zealand

Physical characteristics
- Mouth
  - location: Foveaux Strait

The Murray River is a minor river on Stewart Island / Rakiura of New Zealand. It enters the Foveaux Strait sea on the eastern side of the island.
