= Gray River =

- Route of the Gray River
- Mouth of the Gray River Gray River (South Island)
- Native name: Pūharakeke (Māori)

Location
- Country: New Zealand

Physical characteristics
- Source: Cameron Mountains
  - coordinates: 46°04′42″S 166°50′17″E
- Mouth
  - location: Revolver Bay
  - coordinates: 46°05′25″S 166°44′05″E
  - elevation: 0 m (0 ft)

Basin features
- Progression: Gray River → Revolver Bay → Te Awaroa / Long Sound → Rakituma / Preservation Inlet → Tasman Sea

The Gray River is a river in the Fiordland area of New Zealand. It arises in the Cameron Mountains in Fiordland National Park and flows south-west and then north-west into Revolver Bay, on the south side of Rakituma / Preservation Inlet.

The river may have once flowed into Kisbee Bay, south of its current mouth, but it built a broad flat by depositing glacial debris, changing its course to Revolver Bay.

== See also ==
- List of rivers of New Zealand
