= Yankee River =

Location
- Country: New Zealand
- Region: Southland
- District: Southland

Physical characteristics
- Source: Mount Anglem / Hananui
  - coordinates: 46°44′31″S 167°53′49″E
- Mouth: Foveaux Strait
  - coordinates: 46°41′38″S 167°53′23″E
- Length: 6.7 kilometres (4 mi)

Yankee River is a short river on Stewart Island / Rakiura, New Zealand. The river flows generally northwards from it source on the northern slopes of Mount Anglem / Hananui down to its mouth on Foveaux Strait. Yankee River Hut, a backcountry hut on the North-West Circuit track is located near the river mouth.

== See also ==
- List of rivers of New Zealand
