= Coal Island (New Zealand) =

Native name: Te Puka Hereka
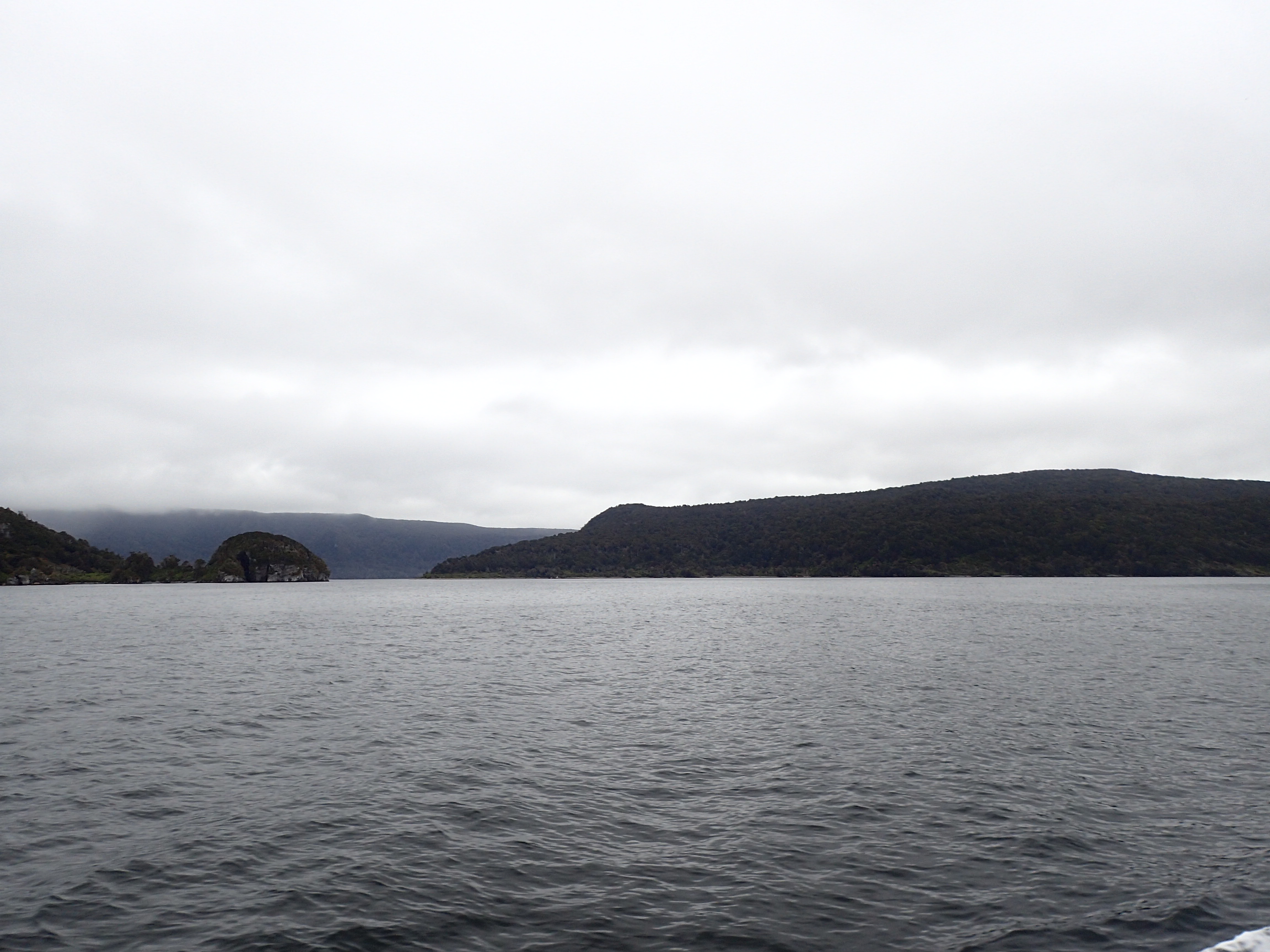
- Coal Island / Te Puka-Hereka on RHS & Steep-To Island LHS - From North

- Location within New Zealand

Geography
- Location: Fiordland
- Coordinates: 46°7′S 166°38′E
- Area: 11.63 km^{2} (4.49 sq mi)
- Highest elevation: 251 m (823 ft)

Administration
- New Zealand

Demographics
- Population: 0

Coal Island is an island in Fiordland, at the southwest of New Zealand's South Island. It lies in the entrance to Rakituma / Preservation Inlet, between Puysegur Point and Gulches Head. Its Māori name is Te Puka-Hereka Island, which translates as "The Tied Anchor".

The island is part of Fiordland National Park and is an important conservation site. It was declared pest-free in 2005 and is one of only nine islands in the area that is completely free of introduced mammalian pests. Since 2005, endangered endemic birds such as the southern brown kiwi (totoaka) and the yellowhead (mohua) have been released on the island.

== See also ==
- Desert island
- List of islands
