= Puysegur Point =

Headland in the South Island of New Zealand

Puysegur Point Tawhitiwhiti-roro (Māori)
- Point
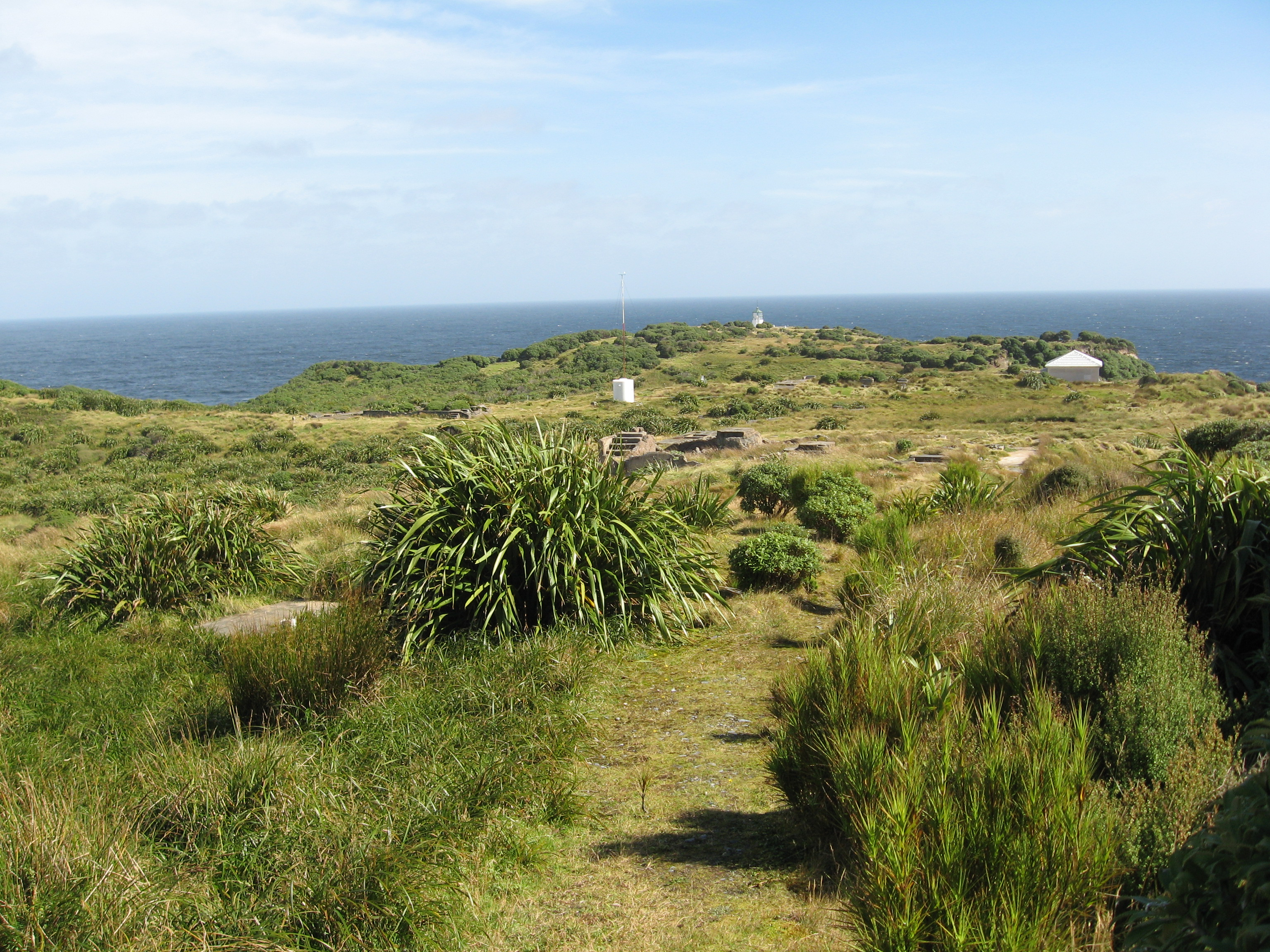
- Puysegur Point Lighthouse and foundations of old lighthouse keepers buildings

- Location within Fiordland Location within New Zealand
- Coordinates: 46.156°S 166.61°E
- Location: Fiordland, Southland District, New Zealand
- Water bodies: Tasman Sea, Rakituma / Preservation Inlet

Puysegur Point, a headland located in the far southwest of the South Island of New Zealand, lies within Fiordland National Park on the southern head of Preservation Inlet, 145 kilometres (90 mi) west-northwest of Invercargill. The name 'Puysegur' was bestowed by Lieutenant Jules Dumont d'Urville or by Midshipman Jules de Blosseville in 1824 during a South Pacific expedition of La Coquille; probably in honour of the French naval officer Antoine-Hyacinthe-Anne de Chastenet de Puységur (1752–1809).

== Geography ==
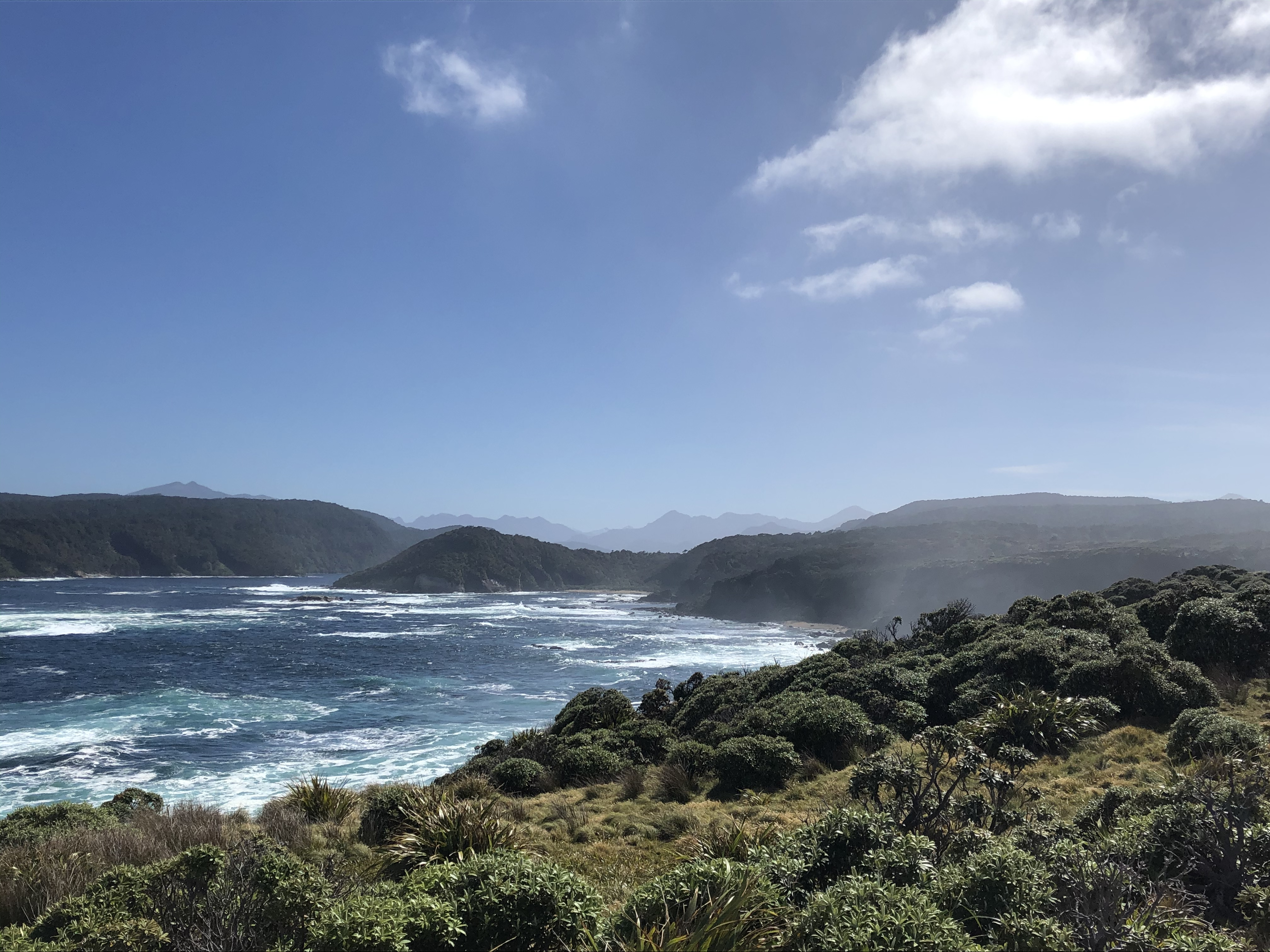
View from Puysegur Point

Puysegur Point has been said to be the windiest place in New Zealand, with gales recorded on an average of 48 days a year. The 2009 Dusky Sound earthquake pushed Puysegur Point closer to Australia by 30 centimetres (12 in).

== Biodiversity ==
Humpback whales pass the point during annual migrations.

== Lighthouse ==
A lighthouse on the point was first illuminated on 1 March 1879. The original wooden lighthouse was destroyed in an arson attack in 1942. The lighthouse was operated by permanent lighthouse keepers from its establishment in 1879 until it was temporarily shutdown in 1980, with a further period of staffed operation from 1987 until it was fully automated and destaffed in 1989.

== The landing ==
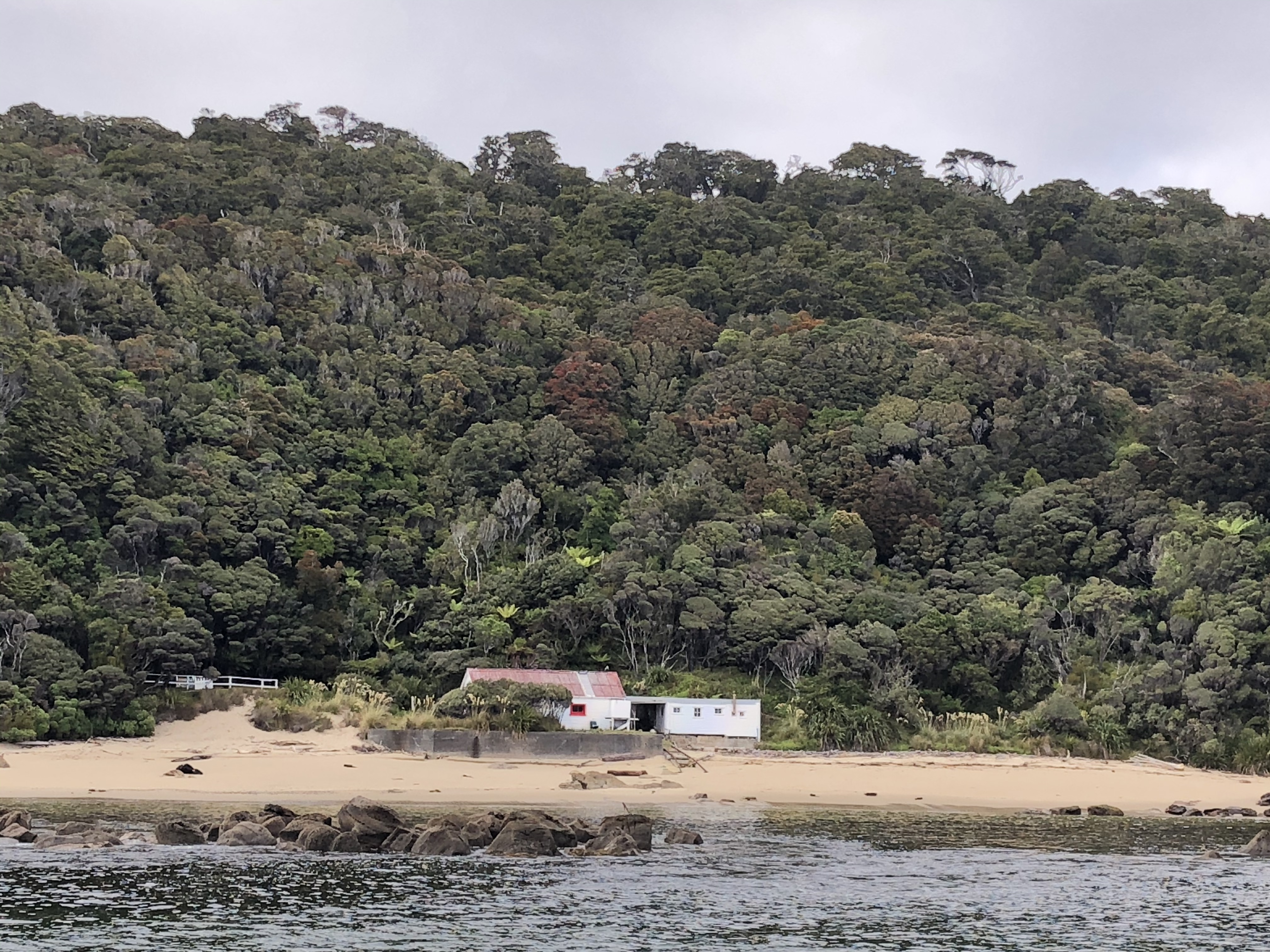
Landing shed at Otago Retreat

The main access to Puysegur Point and the lighthouse is via a track from a beach landing point at Otago Retreat — a narrow waterway between the mainland and Coal Island in Preservation Inlet to the north west of the point. The name Otago Retreat originates from the passage of the schooner Otago that found shelter in this narrow passage during a voyage accompanying the survey ship HMS Acheron on a survey of the South Island around 1850–51. There are buildings remaining at the landing that formerly served the lighthouse. One of the buildings is a Department of Conservation shelter, known as the Landing Shed.

== Climate ==
Climate data for Puysegur Point (1991–2020 normals, extremes 1978–present)
Month	Jan	Feb	Mar	Apr	May	Jun	Jul	Aug	Sep	Oct	Nov	Dec	Year
Record high °C (°F)	24.9 (76.8)	26.0 (78.8)	27.5 (81.5)	23.2 (73.8)	20.9 (69.6)	18.1 (64.6)	18.4 (65.1)	17.8 (64.0)	20.3 (68.5)	22.1 (71.8)	22.7 (72.9)	24.7 (76.5)	27.5 (81.5)
Mean daily maximum °C (°F)	16.6 (61.9)	16.6 (61.9)	15.7 (60.3)	14.3 (57.7)	12.7 (54.9)	11.0 (51.8)	10.7 (51.3)	11.1 (52.0)	12.0 (53.6)	12.7 (54.9)	13.7 (56.7)	15.4 (59.7)	13.5 (56.4)
Daily mean °C (°F)	13.9 (57.0)	14.1 (57.4)	13.2 (55.8)	12.0 (53.6)	10.5 (50.9)	8.8 (47.8)	8.4 (47.1)	8.7 (47.7)	9.6 (49.3)	10.2 (50.4)	11.1 (52.0)	12.8 (55.0)	11.1 (52.0)
Mean daily minimum °C (°F)	11.3 (52.3)	11.6 (52.9)	10.7 (51.3)	9.6 (49.3)	8.3 (46.9)	6.5 (43.7)	6.1 (43.0)	6.3 (43.3)	7.1 (44.8)	7.7 (45.9)	8.6 (47.5)	10.2 (50.4)	8.7 (47.6)
Record low °C (°F)	5.7 (42.3)	5.2 (41.4)	4.0 (39.2)	3.0 (37.4)	1.8 (35.2)	−1.5 (29.3)	−0.3 (31.5)	0.1 (32.2)	1.1 (34.0)	1.7 (35.1)	1.3 (34.3)	0.6 (33.1)	−1.5 (29.3)
Average rainfall mm (inches)	224.9 (8.85)	203.0 (7.99)	225.9 (8.89)	207.0 (8.15)	240.6 (9.47)	209.5 (8.25)	197.1 (7.76)	211.0 (8.31)	193.9 (7.63)	234.8 (9.24)	235.6 (9.28)	195.7 (7.70)	2,579 (101.52)
Source: NIWA
