= Rakituma / Preservation Inlet =

Fiord in the South Island of New Zealand

- Rakituma (Māori)
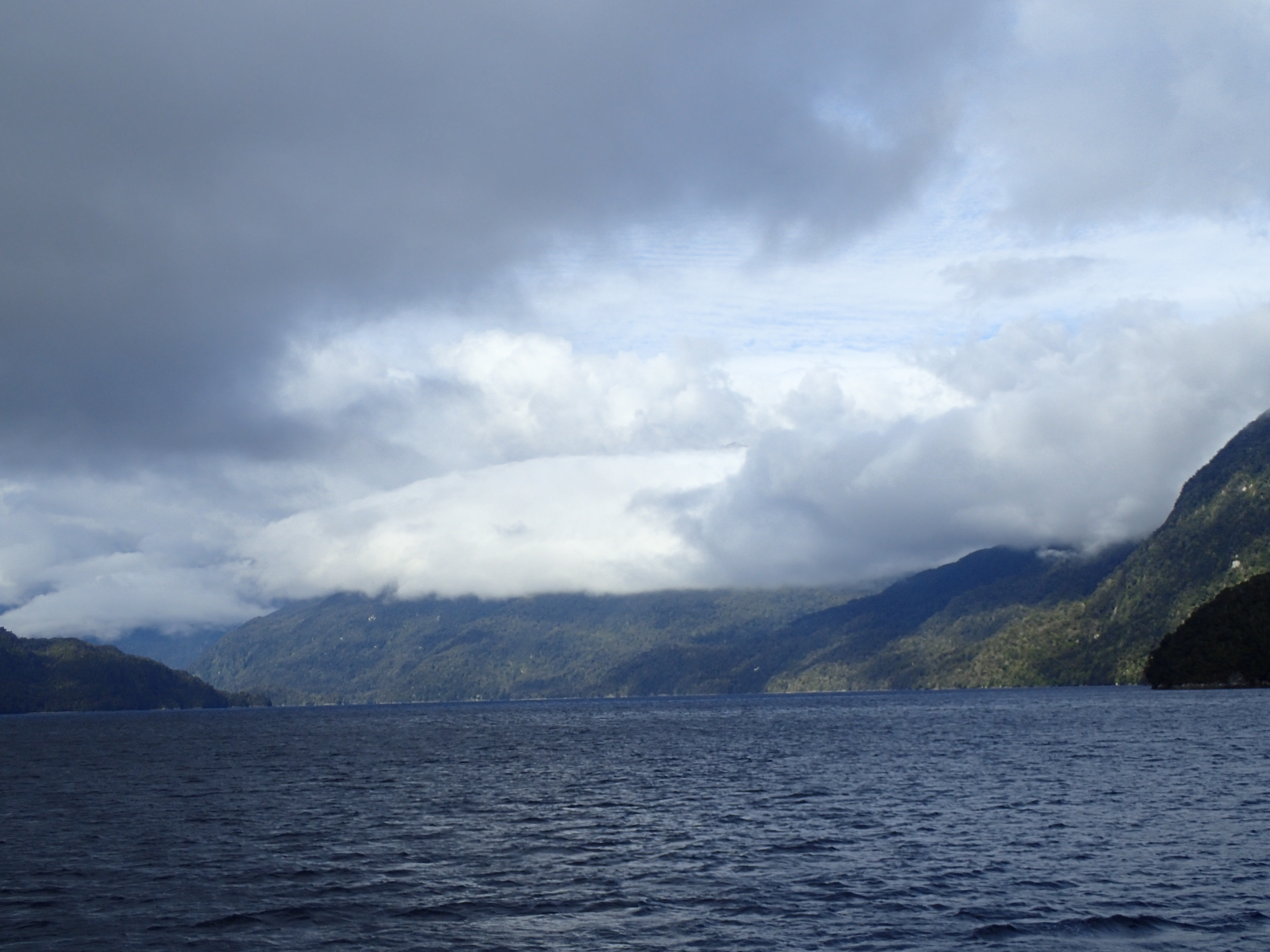
- Te Awaroa / Long Sound, in the upper reaches of Rakituma / Preservation Inlet

- Location in New Zealand Rakituma / Preservation Inlet (New Zealand)
- Location: Tasman Sea
- Coordinates: 46.089°S 166.642°E
- Primary inflows: Long Burn, Gray River, Richard Burn, Margaret Stream, Jeanie Burn, Blacklock Stream, Dawson Burn
- Catchment area: 562 square kilometres (217 sq mi)
- Basin countries: New Zealand
- Max. length: 36.5 kilometres (22.7 mi)
- Max. width: 1.8 kilometres (1.1 mi)
- Surface area: 93 square kilometres (36 sq mi)
- Average depth: 371 square kilometres (143 sq mi)
- Islands: Only Islands, Cording Islands, Weka or Long Island, Steep-to Island, Coal Island
- Sections/sub-basins: Te Awaroa / Long Sound, Useless Bay, Revolver Bay, Isthmus Sound, Otago Retreat

Rakituma / Preservation Inlet is the southernmost fiord in Fiordland National Park and lies on the southwest corner of the South Island of New Zealand. With an area of 93 square kilometres (36 sq mi), it is the fourth largest fiord in New Zealand, after Tamatea / Dusky Sound, Doubtful Sound / Patea, and the neighbouring Taiari / Chalky Inlet to the north. Rakituma was briefly the site of an attempted fishing and gold mining settlement at Cromarty during the 19th century, however this was quickly abandoned once the level of gold declined in relation to more promising fields elsewhere.

Rakituma / Preservation Inlet

== Geography ==
As with Taiari / Chalky Inlet immediately to the north, Rakituma / Preservation Inlet has reasonably complex geography, resembling an inlet in its outer reaches more than the well-defined fiords to the north. According to Māori legend, these fiords were carved by the demigod Tū-te-raki-whānoa using his adze, Te Hamo. Starting from the south with Rakituma, his initial efforts were rough and resulted in rough coastlines with many islands, before perfecting his technique by the time he created Piopiotahi at the north.

The main body of Rakituma is connected to the Tasman Sea by two passages, separated by Coal Island. The main passage of the fiord sits to the north of the island and is 1.67 kilometres (1.04 mi) wide at its narrowest point. Otago Retreat separates Coal Island from the mainland to the south, which has an average width of less than a kilometre and just 375 metres (1,230 ft) at its narrowest point. Numerous smaller islands are located in the middle portion of the fiord, between Coal Island and the entrance to Te Awaroa / Long Sound. The southern half of this section is dominated by two large islands, Weka / Long Island and Steep-to Island, while the northern half has many more smaller islands as part of the Cording Islands group.

Towards the northeast of the lower portion of the fiord, it again splits in two. The upper half forms a roughly 5-kilometre-long arm known as Isthmus Sound, while the lower half forms a narrow channel to the inner fiord. After two further arms – Useless Bay to the north, and Revolver Bay to the south – the fiord changes from its predominant northeasterly direction to the northwest for 5.5 kilometres (3.4 mi). After this, the fiord turns back to its original orientation for the remainder of its length. This inner portion of the fiord, running for approximately 16.5 kilometres (10.3 mi), is known as Te Awaroa / Long Sound. Both the European and Māori portions of this name refer to the fiord's length, with Awaroa translating as "long river". At its head, this fiord is in turn fed by the outlet of Long Burn. Gray River flows nearby the inlet. A large part of the interior of Preservation Inlet is protected by the Te Tapuwae o Hua (Long Sound) Marine Reserve.

== History ==
Known to early sealers and whalers, it was named Port Preservation by Captain Eber Bunker in 1809. The first shore-based whaling station in New Zealand was established here in 1828 or 1829 by Captain Peter Williams, exploiting southern right whales in the area.

In the 1890s gold deposits were found. Two settlements, known as Cromarty and Te Oneroa, were established in Kisbee Bay for miners. However by 1904 only a few miners were left, and few traces of the settlements remain though in places large pieces of rusting equipment can be seen in the regenerating bush at the sites of the historic Alpha and Golden Mines.

In October 2019, the name of the inlet was officially altered to Rakituma / Preservation Inlet.

== Ecology ==
=== Fauna ===
After a massive exploitation for over years, southern right whales finally started returning into the inlet along with Chalky Inlet. There are anecdotal sightings of Hector's dolphins. while bottlenose dolphins are more regularly observed. Southern elephant seals are occasionally observed resting on shore around the inlet.

== Access ==
No roads reach the coast at this point. However, a tramping track is available from Tuatapere to Big River, east of Preservation Inlet. After Big River there is no continuous track or marked route to the inlet. There is also access to the sound by sea or air.
