= Port Craig =

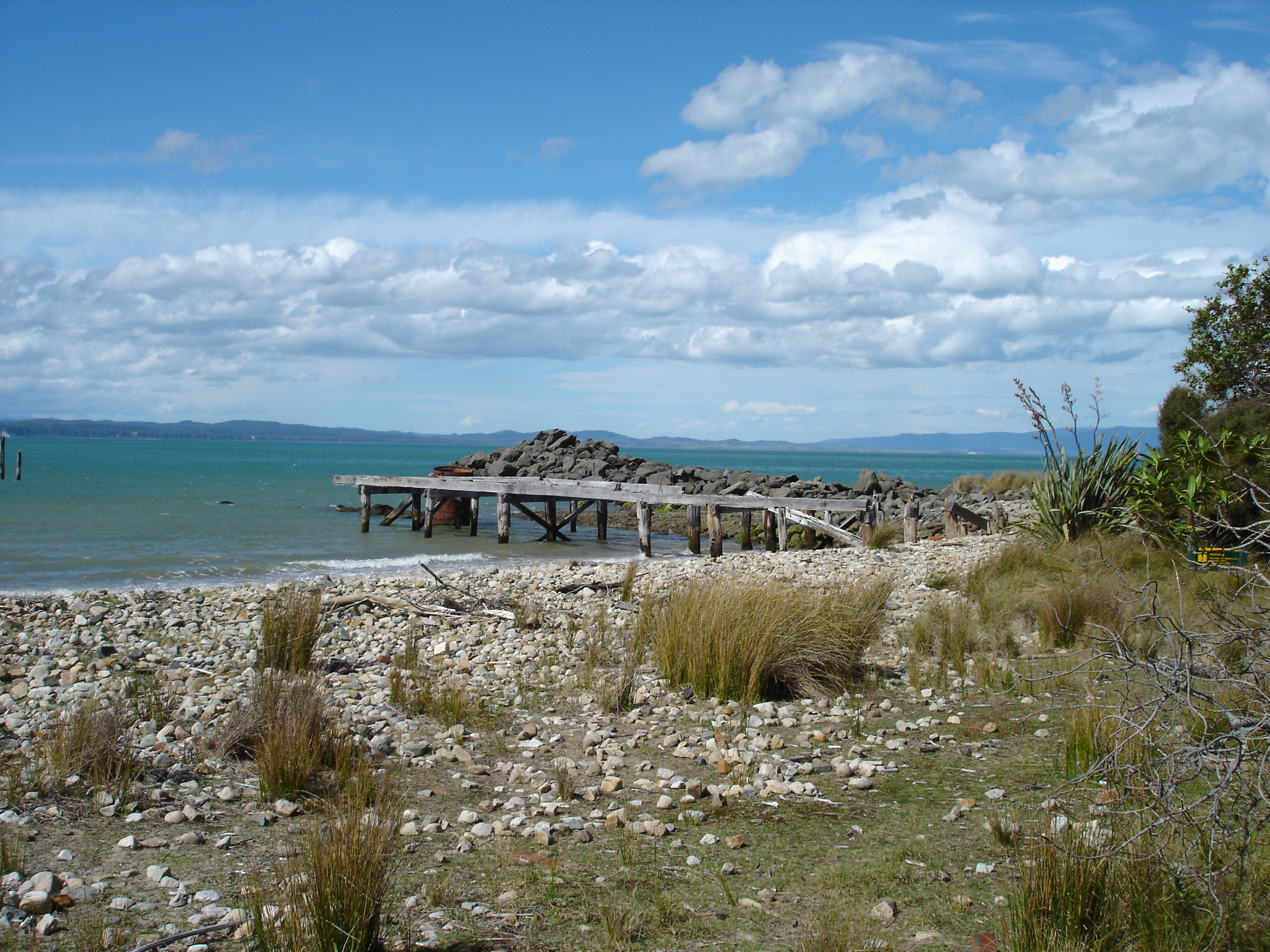
- Remains of wharf
- Interactive map of Port Craig
- Coordinates: 46.2204°S 167.3616°E
- Country: New Zealand
- Region: Southland
- Established: 1916

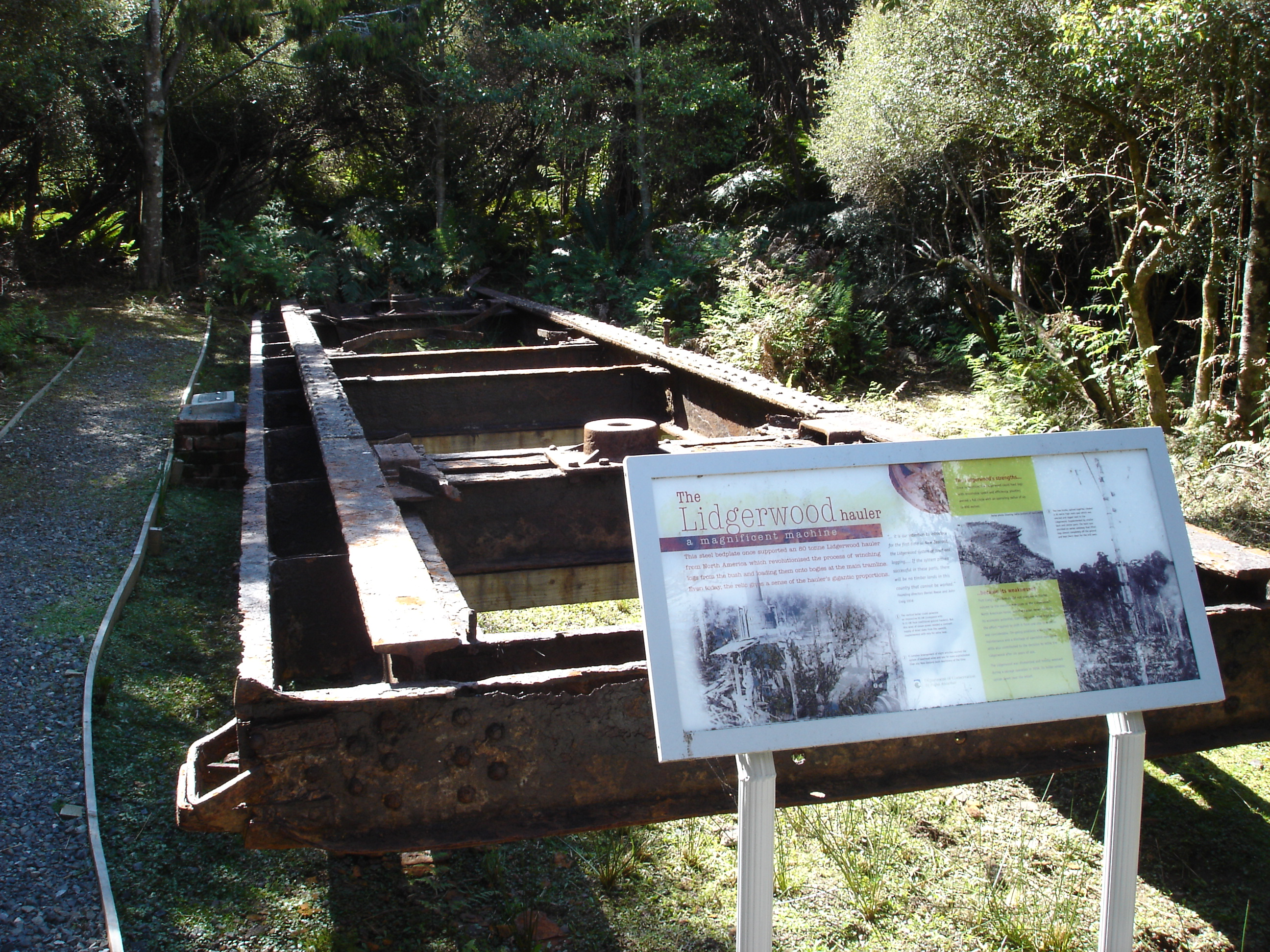
Remains of the Lidgerwood Hauler at Port Craig

Port Craig is located along the south coast (Te Waewae Bay) of the South Island New Zealand near Tuatapere. It was a small logging town born in 1916, with 200+ men women and children living there in its prime. Like other New Zealand bush towns, Port Craig was inhabited by hardy kiwi bushmen and their families, recent immigrants and a few others trying to keep clear of the law. The Marlborough Timber Company had a large scale plan to log one of the countries last significant coastal forests. The company planned big, they built the Dominion's largest sawmill, an extensive tramway system, port facilities and township all without road access. The bush was worked by the Lidgerwood overhead logging cable system (gantry) that weighed over 50 tonnes. The immense size of the gantry meant that it was very difficult to relocate in the inhospitable forest and after one major shift, the gantry was left redundant, crippling the local logging industry.

All that is left of the town is considerable relics including the gantry base, a large English built wince (built in Hull) that operated on the wharf and thousands of bricks. There is also a fairly complete bakers oven and the original school building that is now used as a trampers hut.

== History ==
=== Whaling ===
Mussel Beach had the remains of a whaling station and a 6-oared whaling boat in 1877.

=== Tracks ===
The track from Bluecliffs via Mussel Beach to Puysegur was improved when a phone line was erected in 1908, the first base camp being at Mussel Beach. Cages were installed to cross the major rivers. It was further improved in 1919 and 1920 to a horse track from Bluecliffs to Port Craig.

=== Logging ===
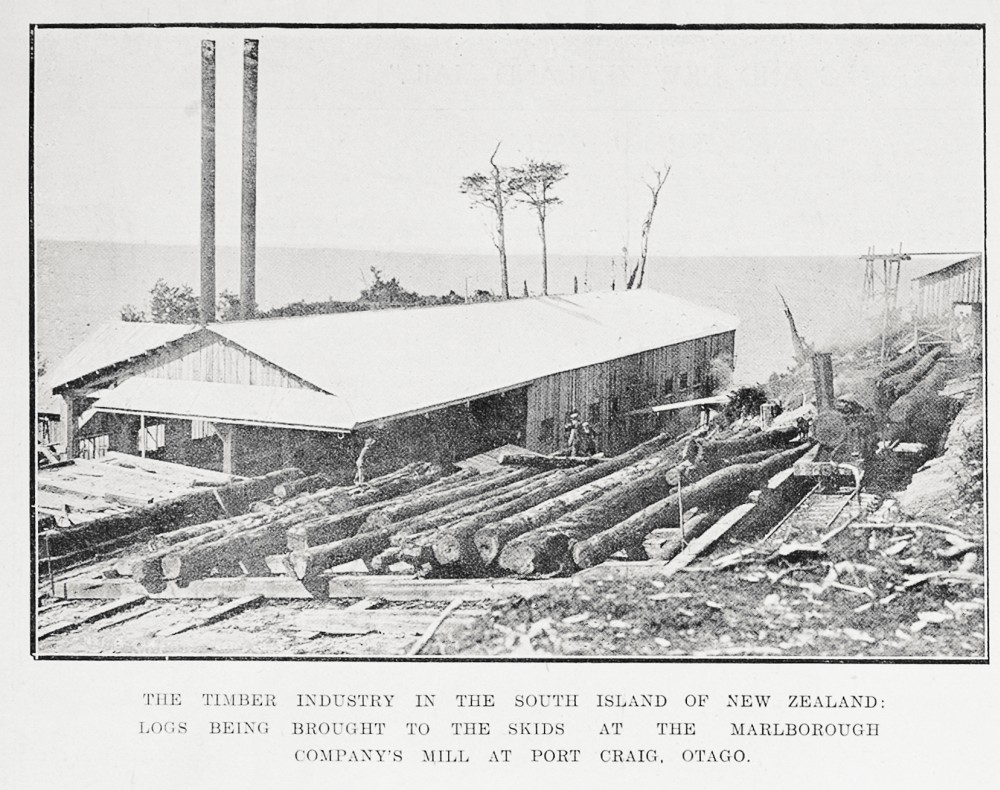
The mill mostly milled rimu, brought along the 14 km tramway

The logging days commenced in 1917 and continued till about 1929, when it shut down in the face of the looming depression.

When John Craig, a manager of the Marlborough Timber Company, drowned at Mussel Beach in 1918, his colleagues approached the directors with the suggestion that the name of the settlement should be changed from Mussel Beach to Port Craig.

==== Tramway ====
Work started on the 3 ft 6 in (NZR gauge) Port Craig tramway in 1917. It ran south from Port Craig, parallel to the coast, for 14.6 km (9.1 mi) to Wairaurāhiri River, with a further 9.8 km (6.1 mi) of branches. It extended over a mile from the mill by 1921 and was extended in 1924. The line was worked by steam locomotives from 1919, including the largest bush locomotive built by A&G Price, a Meyer type Ar 0-4-4-0T, which was on the line from 1926 to 1931. The rails were removed in 1939.

== Nature ==
The area is remote from any big towns or districts, and this led Port Craig to keep surrounding natural environment at its beauty. Southern right whales and Hector's dolphins sometimes can be seen cavorting close to shores. As early as 1896 it was observed that ferrets seemed to have exterminated weka and kākāpō as far west as the Waitutu River.

== Walking Tracks ==
Parts of the tramway were cleared in 2009 to form a route for the Hump Ridge and South Coast Tracks and the school became a hut.

== See also ==
- Hump Ridge Track
- Percy Burn Viaduct
- Tuatapere
- Waitutu Forest
