= Port Craig tramway =

Railway line in New Zealand

Coordinates: 46.241086°S 167.303951°E

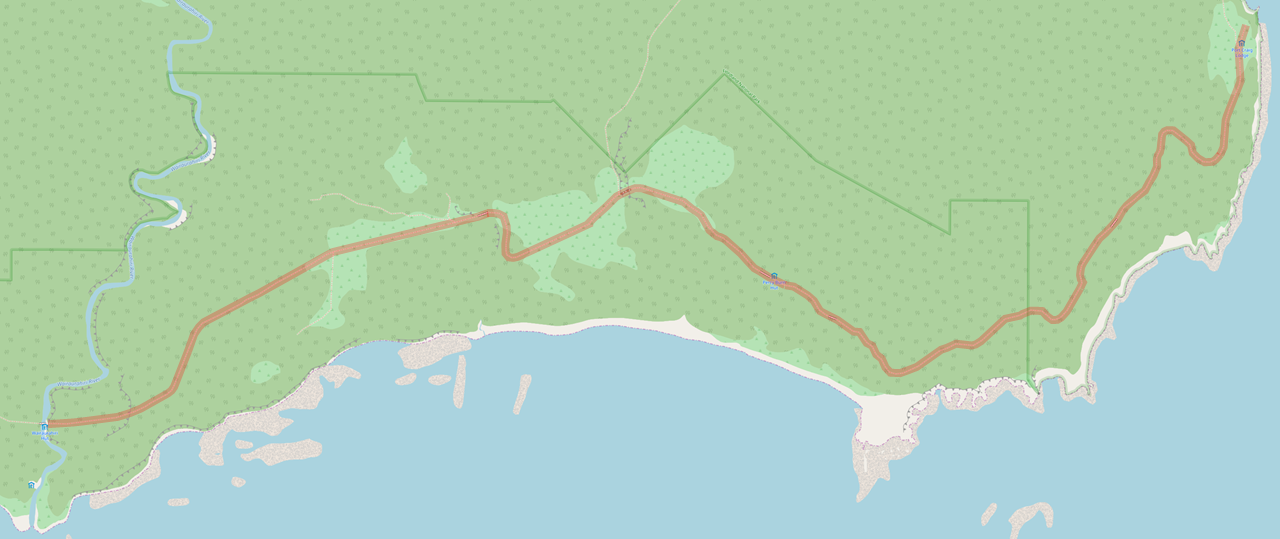

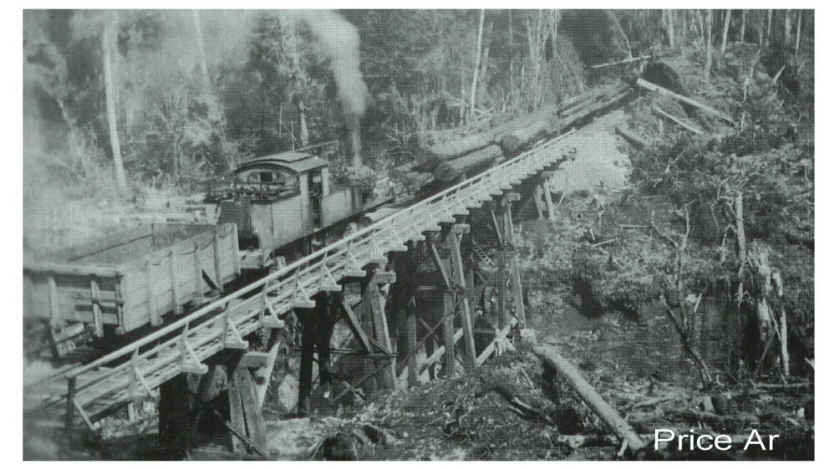
- A&G Price Locomotive Ar #115

Technical
- Track gauge: 3 ft 6 in (1,067 mm)

The Port Craig tramway was an overall 24.4 kilometres (15.2 mi) long, bush tramway with a gauge of 3 ft 6 in (1,067 mm) at Port Craig in New Zealand, which operated from 1917 to 1928.

== Location ==
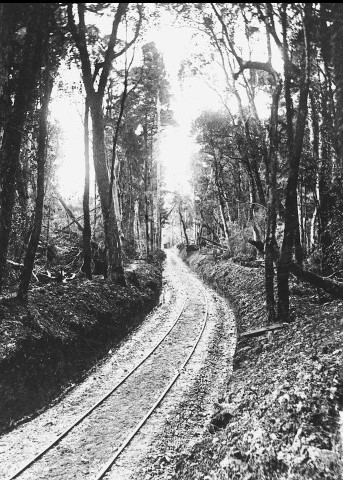
Ballasting of the newly laid logging railway

The 14.6 kilometres (9.1 mi) long main line ran from Port Craig in southerly direction, parallelly to the coast, to the Wairaurāhiri River In addition, there were 9.8 kilometres (6.1 mi) of spur lines. The main line was surveyed with at maximum grade of 33 ‰ (1 in 29.5) and deep cuts and high trestle bridges much more elaborately than similar tramways.

The main line used four large wooden viaducts built around 1925. The Percy Burn Viaduct is 125 m long and 36 m high, and was specified for the transport of the 80 t Lidgerwood steam winch, which had been imported from the United States as well as the heavy load of logging trains. During its construction, Australian hard wood was used, because it has a higher strength and durability than local timber. The trusses of the Sand Hill Viaduct consisted of round hard wood trunks, which were surrounded by less durable sap wood. The other viaducts were made from sawn timber, of which the sap wood had been removed.

The four viaducts are the largest logging railway viaducts of New Zealand. They are listed buildings and are preserved in a structurally weak condition.

== History ==
=== Construction ===
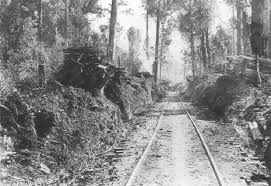
A section of the Port Craig tramway, which had apparently been used by horse-drawn trains

The construction started in 1917. In 1921 more than 1.6 km (1 mi) long section of track has been completed, and this has been extended by 1925. The screws of the trestle bridges were made locally by the blacksmith of Port Craig. He forged every morning a head onto either side of a batch of 200 bolts. He made these from round bars, which had been originally twice as long. Subsequently, he heated them up again and split these into two parts with a sledge hammer and a cold chisel. The teacher of the camp's school, who was employed by the sawmilling company helped him in the afternoon after finishing his classes by cutting the thread onto the bolts. The quality was high, because every bolt which exceeded the nominal length by more than one inch (25 mm) was rejected.

The Sand Hill Viaduct was commissioned in 1924. The larger Percy Burn Viaduct was completed around 1925, and shortly after its erector, the Chester Construction Company went bankrupt because of the overspend. The third and fourth viaducts were probably completed by 1926 the latest. The Sand Hill, Edwin Burn and Francis Burn viaducts were built by Jim Kane, a former bridge builder of New Zealand Railways Department and a team of employees of the sawmilling company.

The Lidgerwood steam which became inoperable in 1926 due to a boiler failure. In 1928 the company went into a financial stalemate and was wound down. It was temporarily re-activated in 1930, but at the end of the 1930s the buildings of the settlement were demolished. Die Schienen wurden 1939 abgebaut.

=== Operation ===
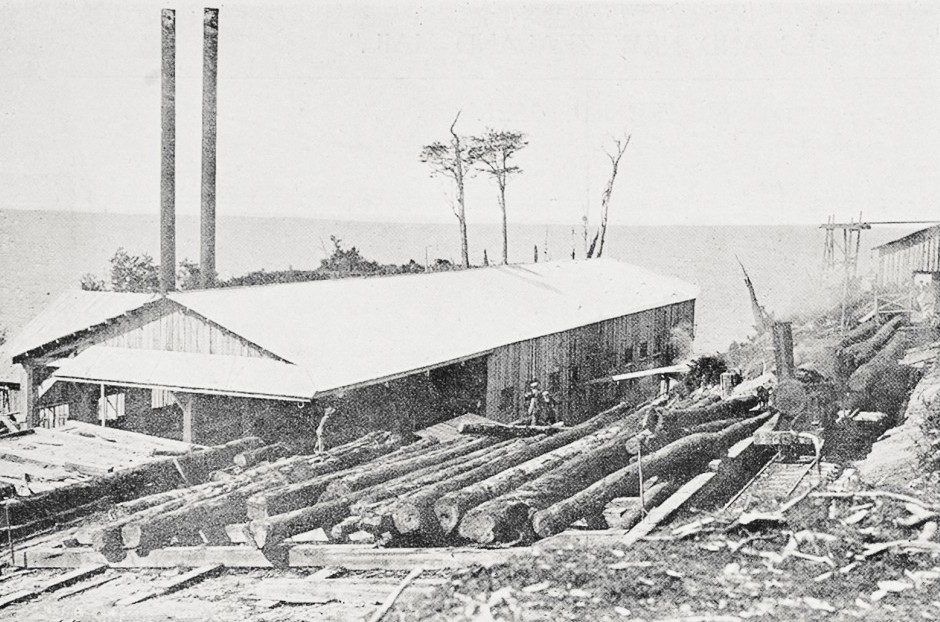
Steam locomotive at the sawmill

The nearby bush areas on Māori land were one of the biggest assets of the location because their harvest did not require a costly government licence, and access only required negotiations with the Māori landowners. The trees on Māori land, which attracted the Marlborough Timber Company (MTC), were on Māori land as a consequence of the South Island Landless Natives Act in 1906, but Māori understood that they could not exploit them on their own. Most Māori thus agreed to the negotiations about harvesting the giant trees in 4,000 acres of bushland. Only the owners of two areas between Mussel Beach and the Wairaurāhiri River objected to selling their trees to the sawmill. The forestry commission demanded that the price to be paid to the Māori owners should not be less than that of the government licences, not only to protect the rights of the Māori but also to ensure that forests requiring a government permit to harvest would not be devalued.

== Closure ==
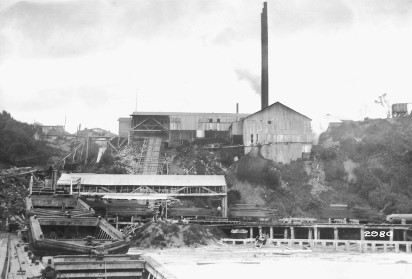
The harbour and the sawmill of Port Craig, 1927

The bush land was less fruitful than expected. The American steam winch was overdimensioned for the NZ bus and shipping was more costly than expected because the new built harbour quickly silted, after the expensive breakwater had been completed, which made loading of ocean going vessels more complicated than originally envisaged. The oversaturated timber markets resulted in unattractive pricing, so that the company became unprofitable, and the investors could not be satisfied.

At the end of 1928 the directors of the company resigned, and the company was closed with very little advance notice to its employees. Shortly after, Sims Cooper, one of the original investors, founded a new company, Holdings Limited, to take over the liquidated assets of MTC. Holdings Limited employed several caretakers, to protect the assets at this remote location, and took-over the log harvesting and tramway licences formerly held by Marlborough Timber Company, in the hope of revamping business and getting a return on their investments.

In previous months, the MTC had obtained a new licence for harvesting the governmental forests north of the Maori land around Percy Burn Viaduct, as it became evident, that they couldn't get funding for a new bridge over the Wairaurāhiri River, which would have been the only alternative, to obtain access to undepleted forest areas. Holdings Limited took over the licences for this area and maintained them from 1928 to 1941. In 1930 they briefly re-commissioned the sawmill, but the sinking timber prices due to the worldwide depression in the 1930s upset their plans. A team salvaged as much as possible in 1938 and demolished the remaining structures. Subsequently, the forestry commission objected to the last request to extend the milling licence and the licences expired.

== Locomotives ==
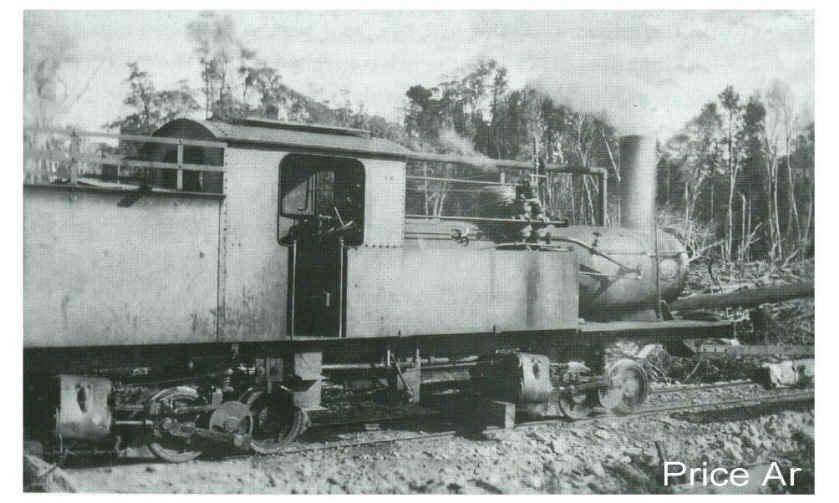
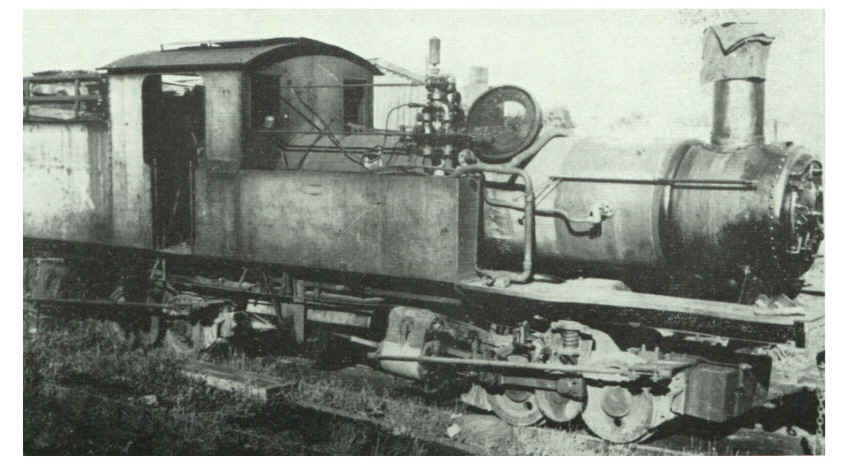
A&G Price Locomotive Ar #115 at Port Craig and after being sold
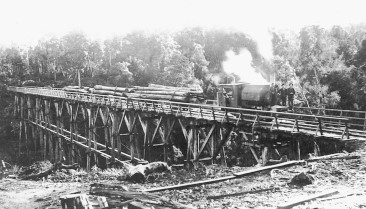
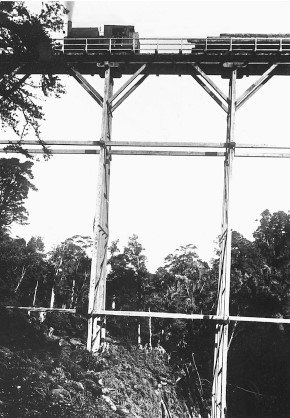
Saddle tank locomotive #28 on the Percy Burn viaduct

Steam locomotives were introduced in 1919.

The A&G Price locomotive Ar #115 was used from 1926 to 1931. It was an articulated 0-4-0+0-4-0 Meyer locomotive. It was the largest and heaviest locomotive that Price have ever built.

In addition a second-hand smaller saddle tank locomotive #28 was used. It was a Davenport with works number 1862 of 1921. Its PWD number at the Public Works Department had been 528. It was sold to Bruce Bay Timber in 1935.

== Walking tracks ==
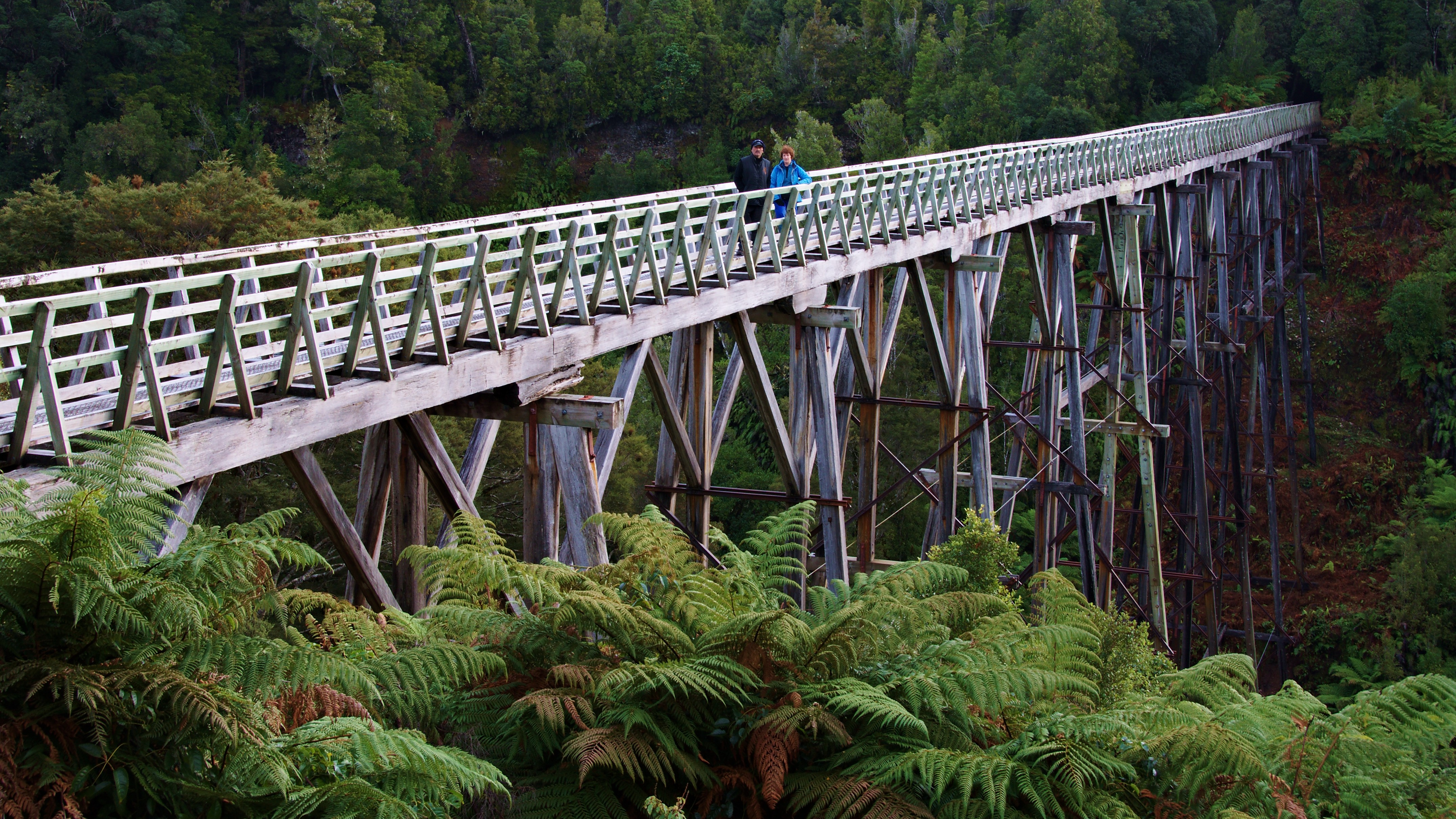
Percy Burn Viaduct

Parts of the right-of-way of the former tramline were made accessible again in 2009 as the Hump Ridge Track and South Coast Track. The former school has been converted to an overnight shelter at the same time.
