= Hump Ridge Track =

Walkway in New Zealand

Coordinates: 46.148617°S 167.474457°E

Tuatapere Humpridge Track
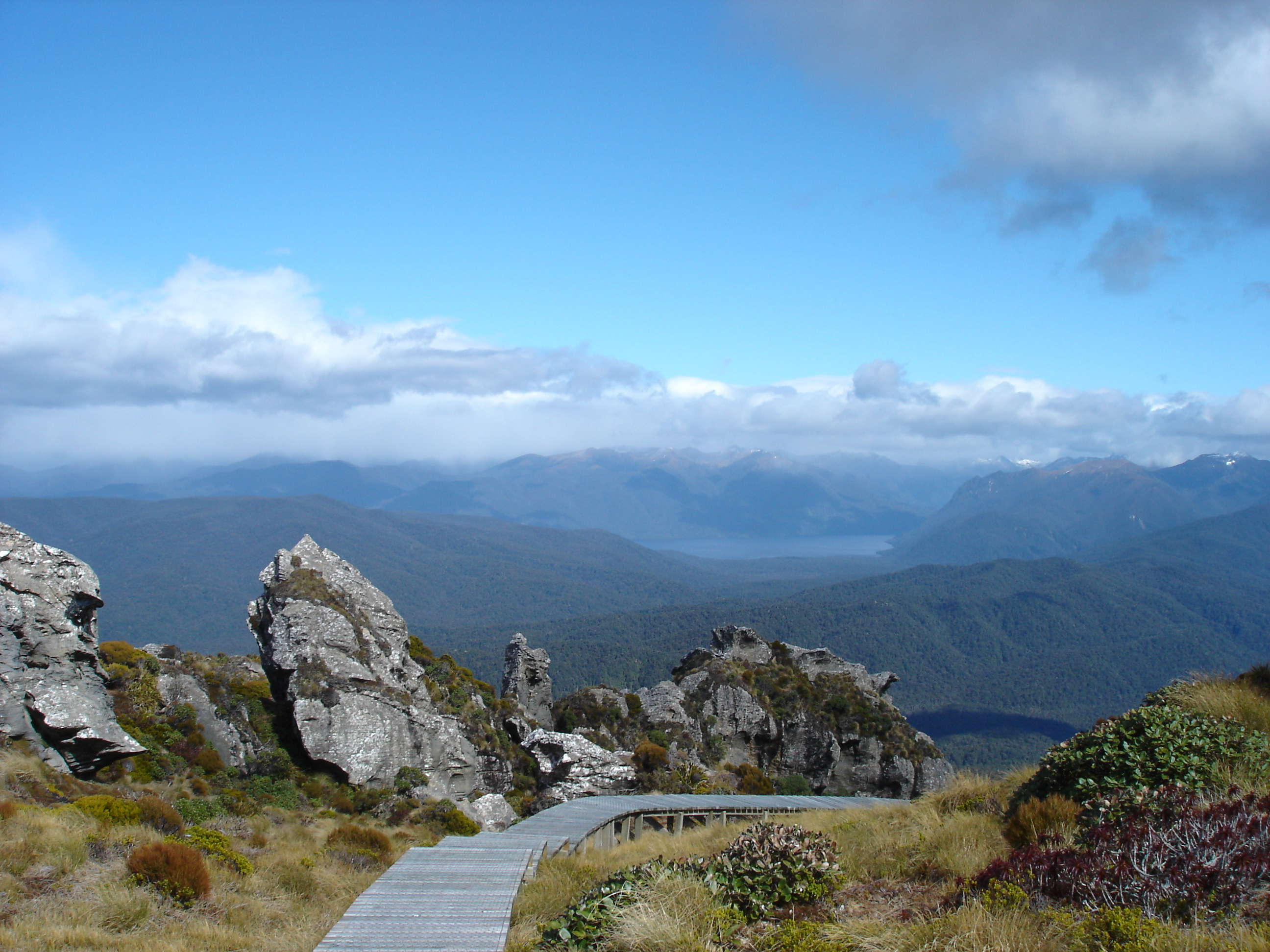
- Boardwalk on the track up near Okaka hut, looking out to Lake Poteriteri
- Length: 61 km (38 mi)
- Location: Fiordland National Park, New Zealand
- Established: 2001
- Trailheads: Rarakau Carpark
- Use: Tramping
- Highest point: Loop track above Okaka Lodge 978 m (3,209 ft)
- Lowest point: Sea level, 4 m (13 ft)
- Difficulty: hard/medium
- Season: Summer to autumn
- Months: October to April. Can be walked in winter months too, but Tuatapere Office is closed
- Sights: Viaducts, alpine views, beaches, forests, tussocklands, Foveaux Strait, historic relics
- Hazards: Tree roots, hypothermia, sunburn, high winds, rocks, snow & rain
- Surface: dirt, rock, sand, tree roots, railway sleepers, boardwalk
- Website: Tuatapere Hump Ridge Track website

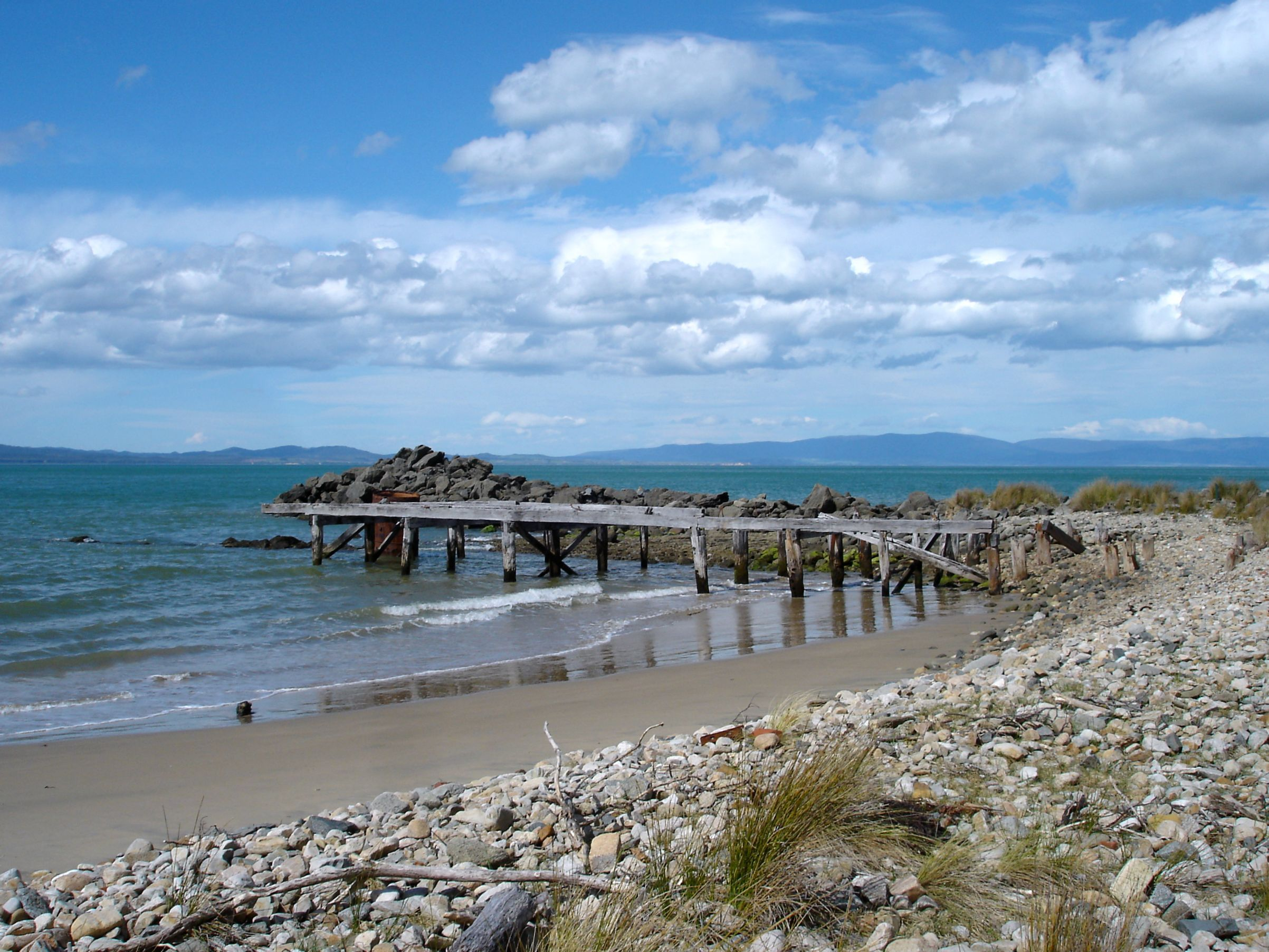
The decrepit wharf left over from the 1917–1928 logging days, at Mussel Beach (Port Craig)

The Hump Ridge Track, also called the Tuatapere Hump Ridge Track, is a 60–62 km walking track that is partly in Fiordland National Park in New Zealand. The track was opened in 2001 and is run privately on behalf of the Tuatapere Hump Ridge Track Charitable Trust.

In 2019 it was announced that the track would become the eleventh of the New Zealand Great Walks, following upgrades. The initial completion date of October 2022 was delayed as a result of COVID-19 lockdowns and supply chain issues. The track was opened as a Great Walk on 25 October 2024.

== Route ==
The Department of Conservation gives the track length at 60 km, while the official website gives it as 62 km. Sources from before its upgrade to a Great Walk ranged from 55 km to 63 km. The track travels along coastline and through sub-alpine mountains in Fiordland.

The loop track begins and ends at a carpark 30 km from the town of Tuatapere. Land crossed by the track is in various different block and owners, Fiordland National Park, several South Island Landless Native Act blocks, the Southland District Council, and private owners. The track is operated by a non-profit business, Tuatapere Hump Ridge Track Inc., on behalf of the Tuatapere Hump Ridge Track Charitable Trust.

The track is a three-day walk with between six and eight hours of walking each day. When walked anticlockwise, the first day begins with a section that closely follows the coastline, after which it climbs almost 1000 metres over 12 kilometers before reaching Okaka Lodge. There is a short loop track near this lodge. The second day follows a ridgeline south, then turns east and crosses three historic viaducts before reaching Port Craig Lodge at Port Craig. The final day travels north again, mainly staying close to the shore. Between six and nine hours walking is required each day to complete the track.

Most of the coastal track is flat and the surface is made of sand or dirt and is easy to walk on. However it can get very boggy near the viaducts between Port Craig and Edwin Burn; this area also has many hundreds of railway sleepers left over from the logging. The hill sections are very delicate and much of it has been laid with boardwalk making walking easier and protecting the ecosystem. Sections that are not covered with boardwalk can have many trees, roots, and much mud to contend with.

There are options to take a helicopter up into the track, as well as to hire guides.

== Popularity ==
As of 2014, about 1800 walkers were completing the track each year. DOC noted that the travel restrictions from the COVID-19 pandemic led to an increase in use of the track as New Zealanders visited places in New Zealand rather than travelling overseas.

AllTrails included Tuatapere in its 25 walks to explore in 2025, out 450,000 trails in its dataset from across the world.

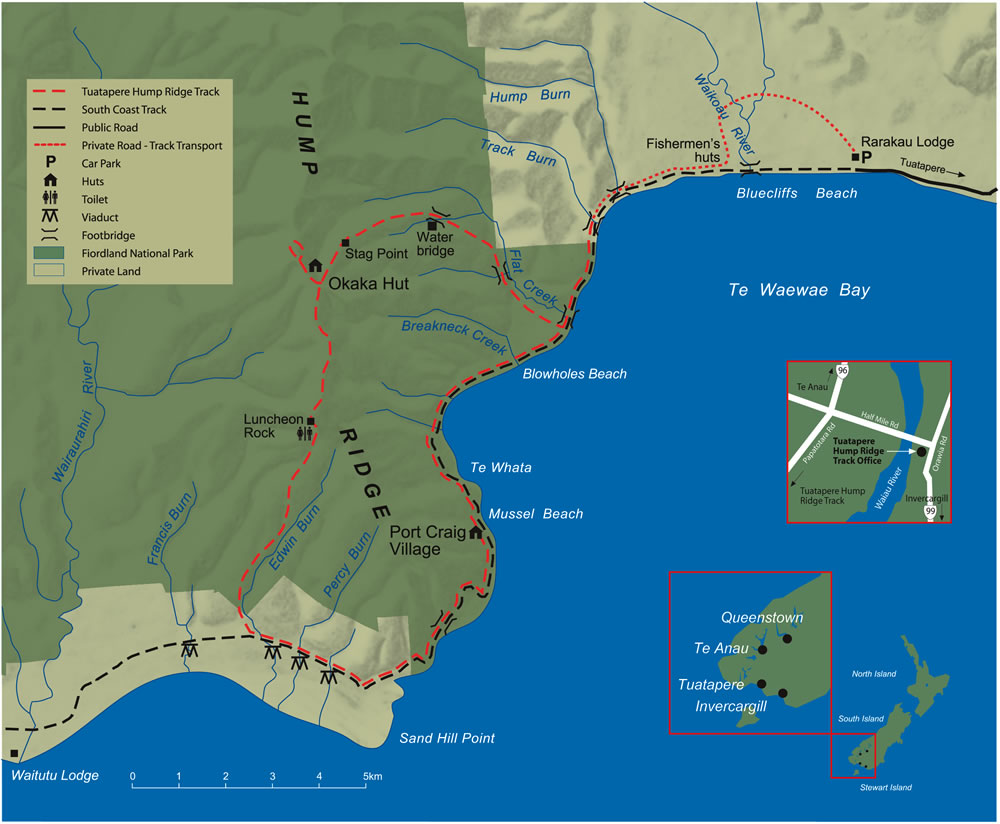
Track Map

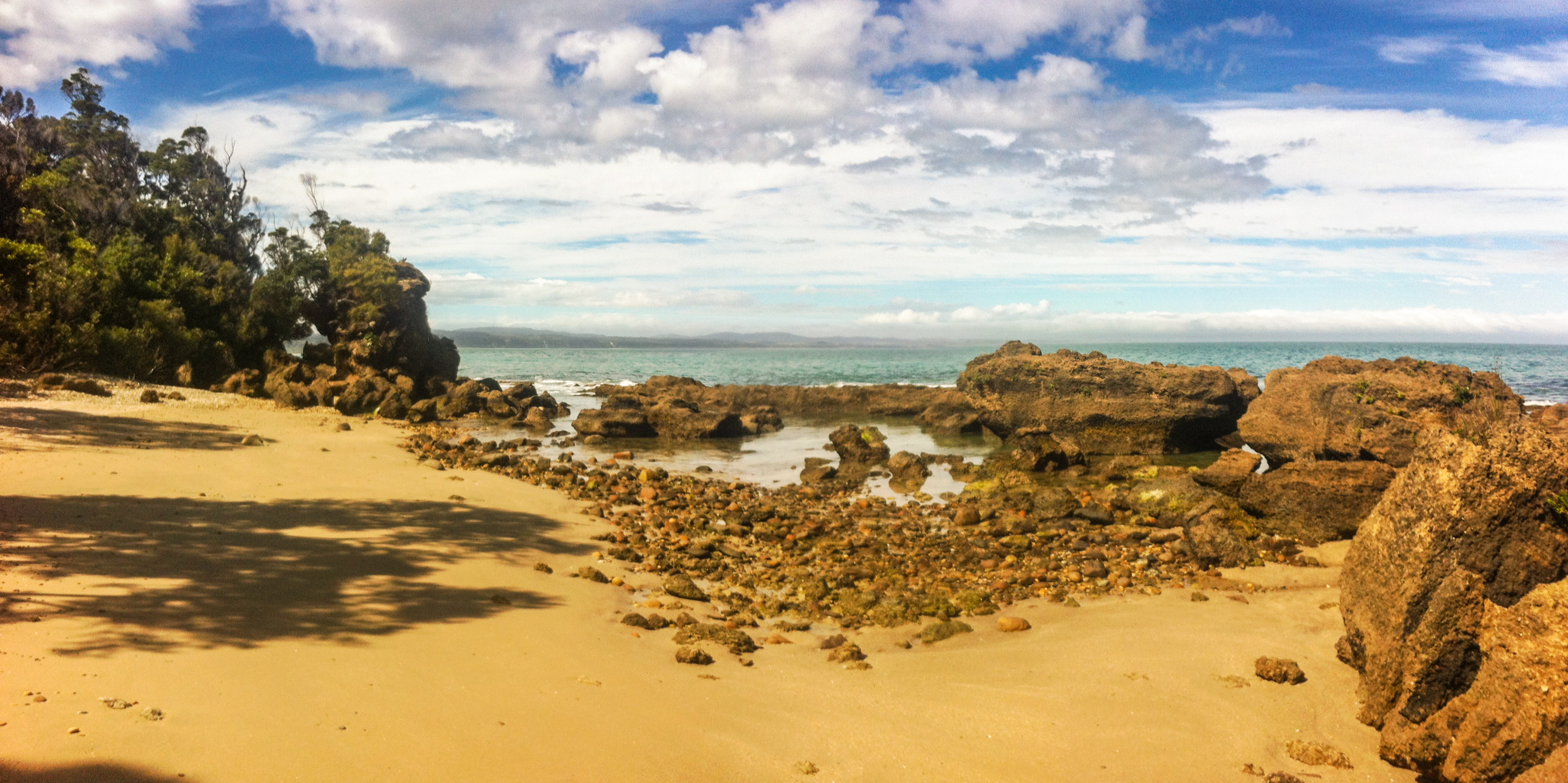
Beach section of track

== History ==
=== History of the area ===
The Waitutu area was visited by early Māori in search of food from the sea, rivers and forests. Kaika or hunting camps were sited on the banks of the Waiau River, near Tuatapere, and the river crossed by mokihi or rafts. Tracks led along the terraces and beaches, probably very close to the track of today, providing access to Sandhill Point, the Wairaurāhiri River, and beyond.

The coastal track was first cut by government workers in 1896 to provide an alternative to the unreliable shipping service to Cromarty and Te Oneroa, gold mining settlements of Preservation Inlet. In 1908 a telegraph line was installed along the track linking the Puysegur Point Lighthouse with Orepuki. Insulators, wire and old maintenance workers' huts can still be found today.

The area where the track is today was previously known for forestry. In 1916, the Marlborough Timber Company had more than 14 km of tramway built through the bush for shipping native timber out from Port Craig. This tramway included four viaducts, of which three now form part of the track. The largest, the Percy Burn Viaduct, is registered as a Category One Historic Place by Heritage NZ Pouhere Taonga and it is one of the world's largest wooden mill tramway viaducts. During the 1920s, Port Craig was the site of the largest and most modern sawmill in New Zealand. The Marlborough Timber Company mill employed over 200 men and produced up to 1800 cubic metres of timber a month.

By 1930, the Port Craig settlement was abandoned, after both supply of and demand for wood was lower than expected. About 14 square kilometres of forest had been logged. Old wharf piles remain, along with old building materials and the Port Craig school, which has been converted into a hut for trampers.

=== Construction of the track ===
A ban on logging native timber was placed in the mid-1980s, leading to several sawmills in the area closing, and there was also a downturn in the farming industry about the same time. The idea for the Hump Ridge Track came in response; construction of the track would provide work to locals and tourism from walkers would bring in income.

The track was made from 1994 to 2001. A charitable trust was created and, in the words of one reporter, the community "spent years battling with red tape and fund-raising". The track was built by community volunteers, mainly over nine months, and it was opened in November 2001. The track cost $3,950,000 NZD to construct.

=== Great Walk upgrade project ===
In 2019, it was announced that the Hump Ridge Track would become a New Zealand Great Walk, one of a set of premier tramping tracks maintained by New Zealand's Department of Conservation (DOC). DOC had run a process, starting in 2017, to choose an existing track to upgrade to join the Great Walk set. The decision was announced by Minister of Conservation Eugenie Sage in Tuatapere. The decision was supported by locals in the town of Tuatapere who felt the status would attract tourism to the region, though there was concern that the town would not have enough infrastructure to support that tourism.

The aim of the project was "to develop the Tuatapere Hump Ridge Track into... a world-class visitor experience that reflects the significant cultural and heritage values of the area and inspires increased conservation advocacy." It was originally announced that it would open as a Great Walk in late 2022 and that the project to upgrade it would cost $5 million, but the project was delayed. As of November 2021, around $200,000 has so far been spent on the project on engineering and geotechnical work to understand the environment and its risks. At that time, a DOC director said that the final budget could be up to $NZ7 million and that the intent was to break ground on the project work by the end of 2021 and to open the Great Walk for the 2023–2024 summer season. The track will remain open to trampers during the upgrade work.

Several upgrades are planned to raise the track to Great Walk standards. DOC plans to make the track a little easier by improving the track standard, lowering its gradient in places, putting board walks in place of muddy areas, building staircases, and setting the walk up to be a three-night trip instead of two nights. The project may also include improving resilience to climate change, erosion, and earthquakes; assessment and perhaps upgrades to the existing viaducts; upgrades to existing huts or building a new hut; and construction of swing bridges or bypasses. DOC also intends to make the stories of the people and industry of the region part of the walk's experience.

While DOC is leading the upgrade project, it has oversight from a group that includes Te Rūnanga o Ōraka-Aparima, the Tuatapere Hump Ridge Track Charitable Trust and Tuatapere Hump Ridge Track Inc. DOC has stated that once the project is complete, Tuatapere Hump Ridge Track Charitable Trust will continue to manage and operate the track and its facilities.

== Stump the Hump ==
The Stump the Hump is an annual event where participants attempt to complete the entire track in under 24 hours. that traverses the Hump Ridge track in the standard anti-clockwise direction. It was started in 2011 and walkers start early at midnight on a Friday in February with lights to guide their way. It is expected most walkers will finish the track in less than 24 hours. Any money raised goes to track maintenance.

It has not been hosted for a number of years.

== Flora and fauna ==
Near the coast are dense forests of rimu, miro, Hall's tōtara and rātā. The lower terraces are mainly podocarp and silver beech, while the higher terraces are dominated by yellow-silver pine. Birds that can be seen include the kākā, kea, yellow-crowned parakeet, South Island robin, fantail, bellbird, grey warbler and South Island tomtit. Hector's dolphins are often seen around Port Craig and occasionally people are able to swim with them.

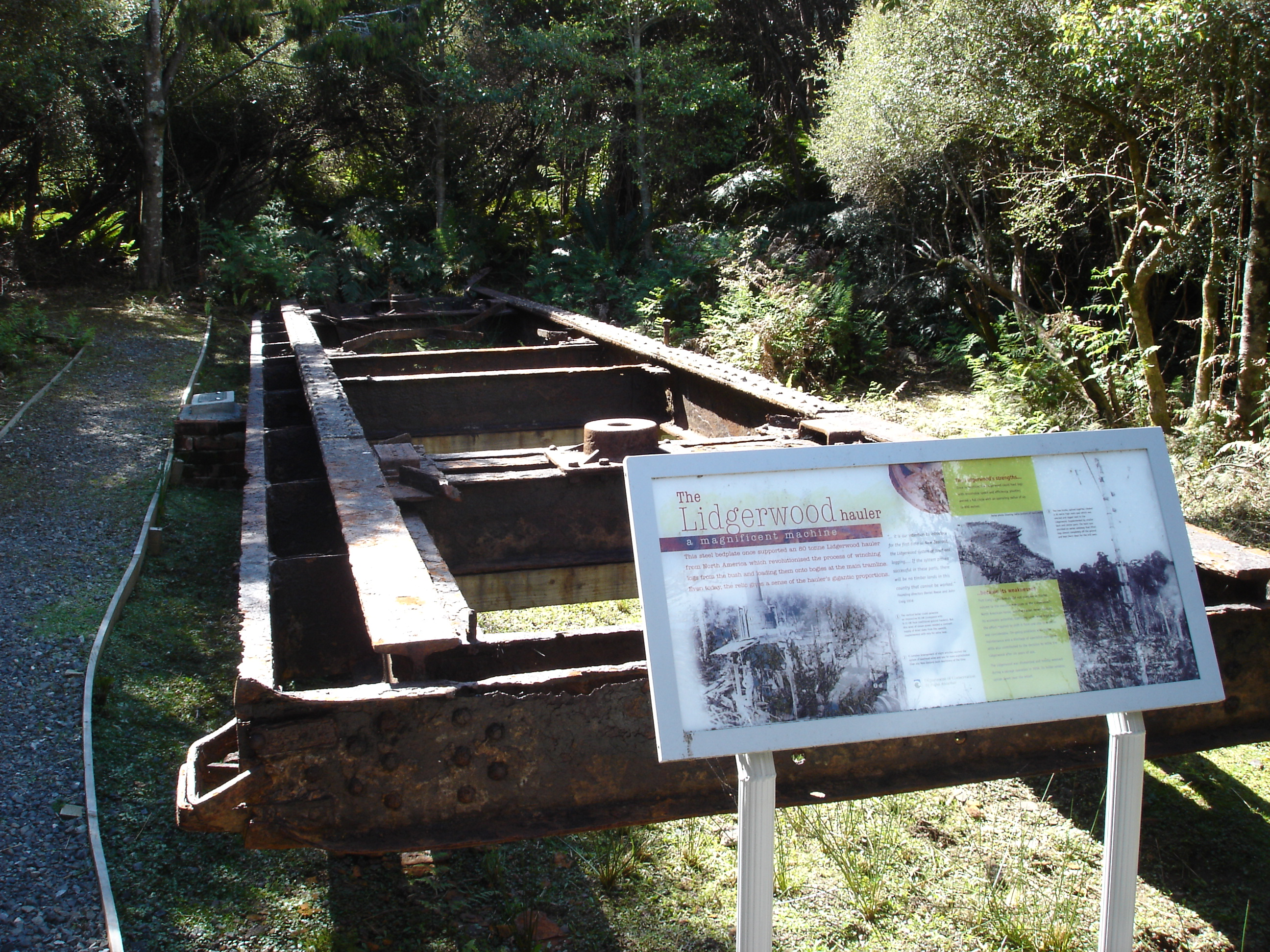
The Department of Conservation has put in a heritage trail at Port Craig including this 80-ton base to the steam-powered Lidgewood Hauler.
