= Rooney River =

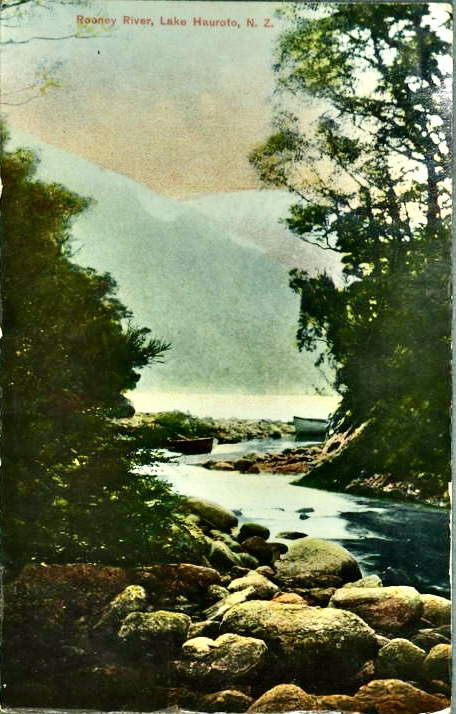
- Rooney River and Lake Hauroko
- Route of the Rooney River
- Mouth of the Rooney River Rooney River (South Island)

Location
- Country: New Zealand

Physical characteristics
- Source: Kaherekoau Mountains
  - coordinates: 45°51′21″S 167°15′24″E
  - elevation: 1,000 m (3,300 ft)
- Mouth
  - location: Lake Hauroko
  - coordinates: 45°54′55″S 167°17′17″E
  - elevation: 155 m (509 ft)
- Length: 8 km (5.0 mi)

Basin features
- Progression: Rooney River → Lake Hauroko → Wairaurāhiri River → Foveaux Strait

The Rooney River is a river in southern Fiordland, New Zealand. It rises in the Kaherekoau Mountains and flows southward into Lake Hauroko.

It was named after John Rooney, who hired out boats and ran a launch and tourist service on the lake from 1908 to about 1912. Mr Rooney gave up a block of land at the lake in 1917.

The valley is mainly formed in Jurassic Hunter Intrusives, mainly diorites, and follows a fault line in its lower reaches.

== See also ==
- List of rivers of New Zealand
