= Rural Heritage Southland =

New Zealand historic preservation and stewardship charity

Southland Rural Heritage Banner

Rural Heritage Southland is a Heritage Trust that was established in 2002. Originally it was designed to illustrate family farm life in Southland, New Zealand from the inter-war period of 1925–1935. The focus has now shifted to include all southern rural heritage (such as agriculture, horticulture, machinery, farm equipment and oral history). As such, the Rural Heritage Southland now has assumed more of a stewardship role of safeguarding and promoting the rural past through its various projects.

Southland Rural Heritage Trust Logo

== Projects ==
Rural Heritage Day — This living history event is held every two years. It includes a wide range of rural domestic and working exhibitions from: blade shearing to dog handling, and jam making to blacksmithing. Competitions such as hay bale throwing (over rugby posts) and rides on traction engines are particularly popular.

Oral History Project — this project begun in 2006 aims to record as many stories about Southland's rural heritage as possible before they are gone. It also acts as a training ground for new oral historians to learn interview techniques and how to use digital recording equipment. The recorded stories are accessible from the Invercargill Public Library.

Southland Regional Heritage Forum - First held at Southland Boys High School in April 2012. The Heritage Forum is chance for Southland heritage organisations to get together, share ideas and network.
