= Waitutu River =

- Route of the Waitutu River
- Mouth of the Waitutu River Waitutu River (South Island)

Location
- Country: New Zealand

Physical characteristics
- Source: Lake Poteriteri
  - coordinates: 46°10′58″S 167°05′32″E
  - elevation: 30 m (98 ft)
- Mouth
  - location: Foveaux Strait
  - coordinates: 46°14′29″S 167°04′02″E
  - elevation: 0 m (0 ft)
- Length: 9 km (5.6 mi)

Basin features
- Progression: Waitutu River → Foveaux Strait

The Waitutu River is a river in southern Fiordland, New Zealand. It is the outlet of Lake Poteriteri to the sea.

The name Waitutu River is official and can be translated as Boisterous waters. The river is crossed by a suspension bridge on the South Coast Track. Along the Track, Waitutu is 13 from Wairaurāhiri Hut and 12 from Big River. A DoC hut is close to the river mouth. Another is a few hundred metres up the Slaughterburn tributary.

== Climate ==
Climate data for Waitutu (1991–2020)
Month	Jan	Feb	Mar	Apr	May	Jun	Jul	Aug	Sep	Oct	Nov	Dec	Year
Mean daily maximum °C (°F)	19.0 (66.2)	18.7 (65.7)	17.5 (63.5)	15.1 (59.2)	12.2 (54.0)	9.7 (49.5)	9.3 (48.7)	11.3 (52.3)	13.2 (55.8)	14.8 (58.6)	16.0 (60.8)	17.9 (64.2)	14.6 (58.2)
Daily mean °C (°F)	14.0 (57.2)	13.8 (56.8)	12.3 (54.1)	10.5 (50.9)	8.3 (46.9)	5.9 (42.6)	5.3 (41.5)	6.5 (43.7)	8.3 (46.9)	9.8 (49.6)	11.0 (51.8)	12.9 (55.2)	9.9 (49.8)
Mean daily minimum °C (°F)	9.0 (48.2)	8.8 (47.8)	7.1 (44.8)	5.9 (42.6)	4.3 (39.7)	2.1 (35.8)	1.4 (34.5)	1.8 (35.2)	3.5 (38.3)	4.8 (40.6)	6.1 (43.0)	7.8 (46.0)	5.2 (41.4)
Average rainfall mm (inches)	184.2 (7.25)	174.0 (6.85)	160.0 (6.30)	275.7 (10.85)	276.0 (10.87)	180.3 (7.10)	272.3 (10.72)	200.8 (7.91)	235.7 (9.28)	257.8 (10.15)	196.5 (7.74)	175.0 (6.89)	2,588.3 (101.91)
Source: NIWA

== See also ==
- List of rivers of New Zealand
