= Lake Hauroko =

Lake in the South Island of New Zealand

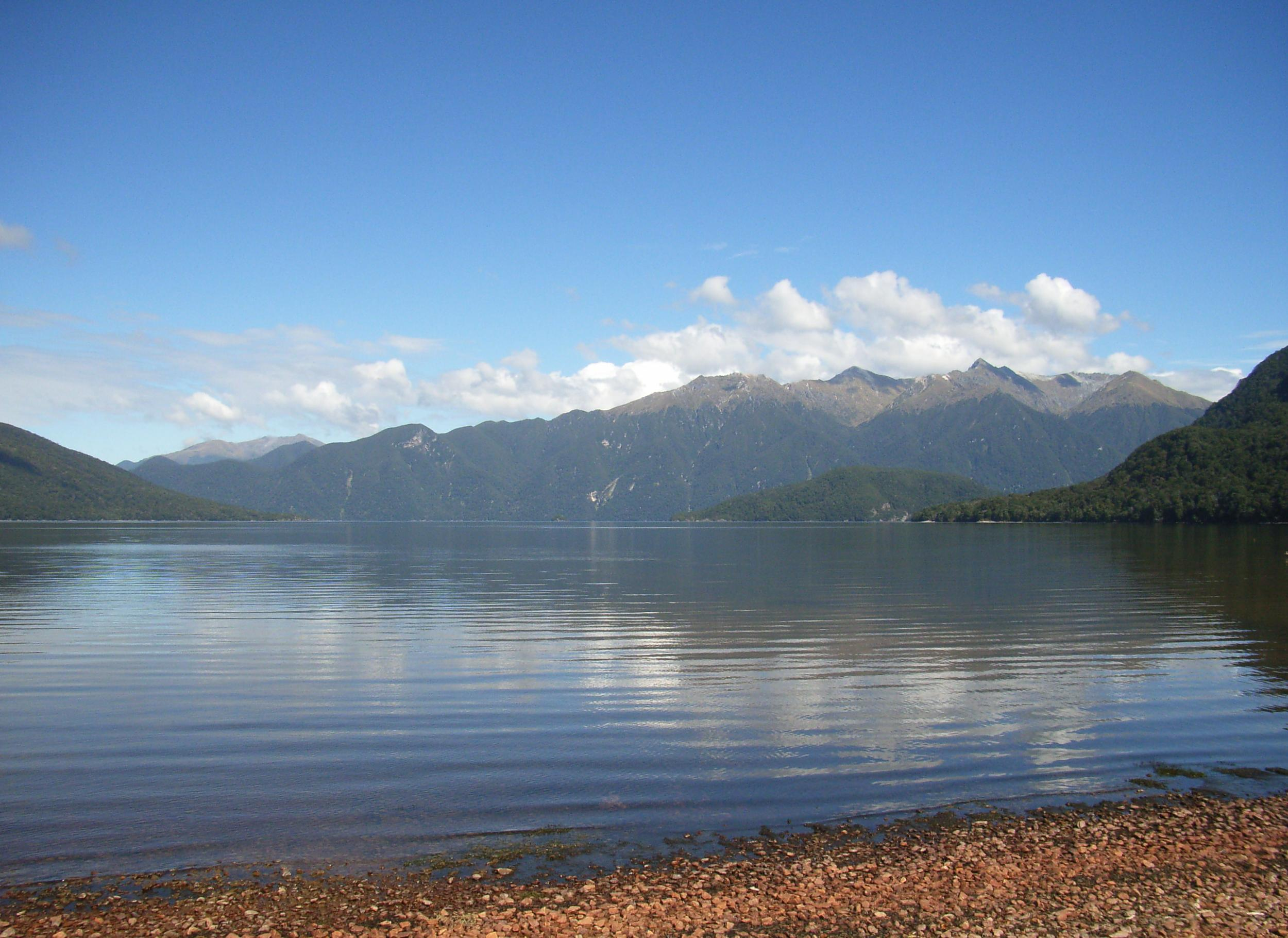
- Lake Hauroko

- Location within South Island
- Interactive map of Lake Hauroko
- Location: Fiordland National Park, Southland District, Southland, South Island
- Coordinates: 46°00′S 167°20′E
- Type: Glacial lake
- Primary inflows: Caroline Burn, Hay River, Hauroko Burn, Russet Burn, Rooney River
- Primary outflows: Wairaurāhiri River
- Catchment area: 195 mi^{2} (510 km^{2})
- Basin countries: New Zealand
- Max. length: 40 km (25 mi)
- Surface area: 63 km^{2} (24 sq mi)
- Average depth: 116.7 m (383 ft)
- Max. depth: 462 m (1,516 ft)
- Water volume: 7.35 km^{3} (1.76 cu mi)
- Surface elevation: 150 m (490 ft)
- Islands: Mary Island

Lake Hauroko is the deepest lake in New Zealand. The lake, which is 462 metres (1,516 ft) deep, is located in a mountain valley in Fiordland National Park.

== Etymology ==
"Hauroko" translates from te reo Māori as "soughing of the wind" or "sounding wind". Prior to 1930, the lake was also called "Lake Hauroto".

== Geography ==
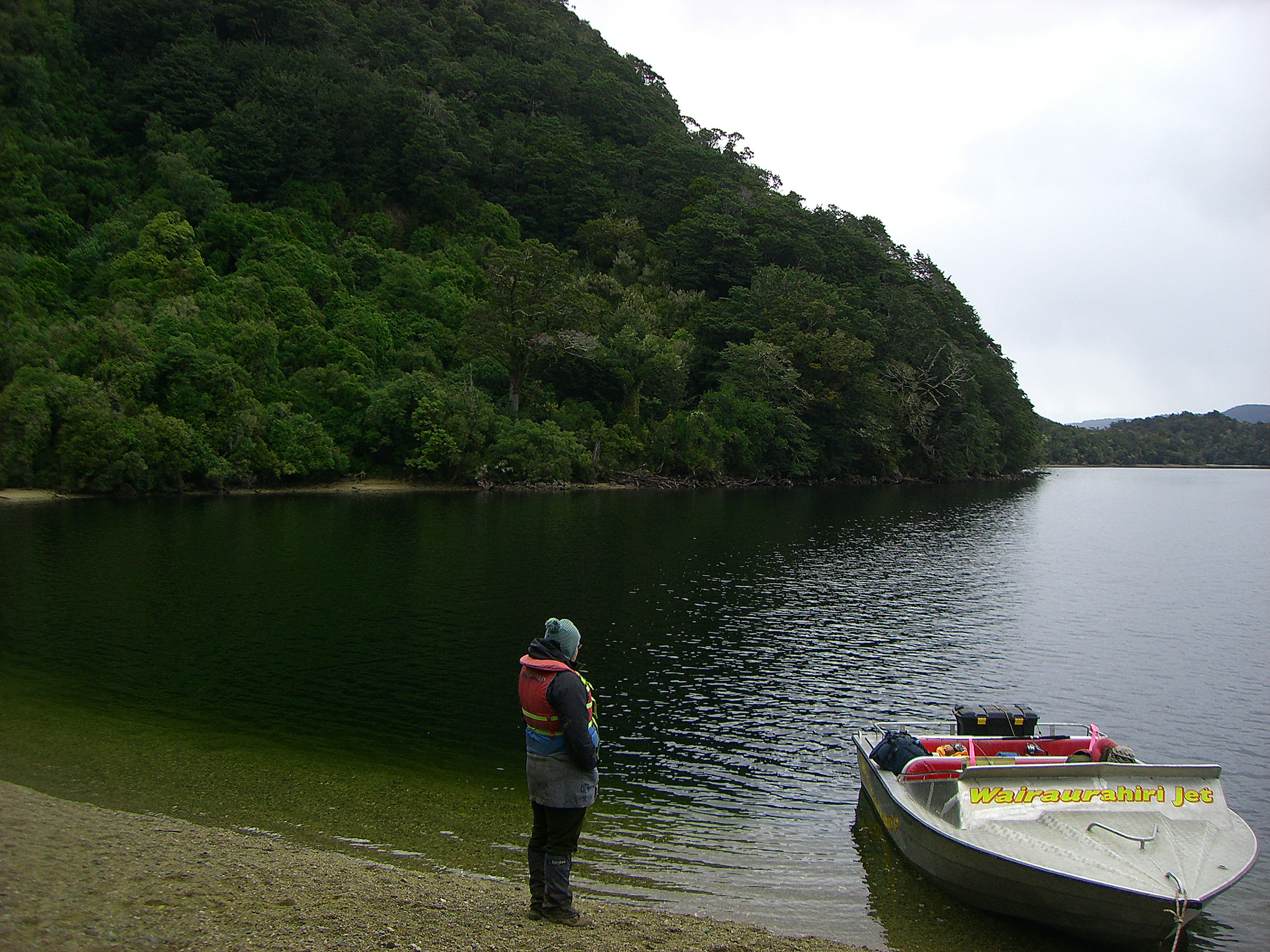
Jetboating on Lake Hauroko

Lake Hauroko is 462 metres (1,516 ft) deep; sources range from calling it the 16th deepest lake in the world to the 23rd deepest. The S-shaped lake is 32 kilometres (20 mi) long and has a surface area of 65 square kilometres (25 sq mi). The lake surface is about 155 metres (509 ft) above sea level.

One of the country's southernmost lakes, it is only 13 km from the southern coast of the South Island. It sits between the similarly-sized lakes Monowai and Poteriteri. According to the 1925 New Zealand Official Yearbook, it drains about 1,800 ft^{3} (51 m^{3})/sec via the 20 km (12 mi)-long Wairaurāhiri River into Foveaux Strait 10 kilometres to the west of Te Waewae Bay.

The largest island in Lake Hauroko is Mary Island, named in 1883 after the wife of the government surveyor John Hay. A smaller island is adjacent to Teal Bay at the southern end of the lake. There are also a few other smaller islets and rocks in the lake.

== Geology ==
Traditionally, Ngā Puna Wai Karikari o Rakaihautu say the lake was dug by rangatira Rākaihautū on his journey south with his ko. The lake is a Statutory Acknowledgement site under the Ngāi Tahu Claims Settlement Act 1998.

From a geological perspective, it is a glacial lake formed near the Hauroko Fault. It and other faults in the area have slipped several kilometres. The higher ground consists of early carboniferous granites and metamorphic rocks, with much more recent Hauroko Formation Eocene - Oligocene sediments such as calcareous sandstone, on the lower ground, towards the southeast.

Hauroko granite is about 358 million years old, medium grained, white, granodiorite and granite, with red-brown biotite. It has intruded dikes, plugs and xenoliths into metasediment. Albert Edward Granite is coarser, with pink K-feldspar megacrysts and green-brown biotite. There are also small amounts of carboniferous diorite. Towards the northwest of the lake, the area between the Hauroko Burn and the Hay River has dioritic, felsic dykes.

== Access ==
A 30 km (19 mi) road from Clifden to the lake was built in about 1909 and improved in the 1960s. A water taxi runs to the Dusky Track, which starts at the north end of the lake and leads to Lake Manapouri.

== Burial on Mary Island ==
Mary Island is the subject of several local myths, including one that the island is subject to a Māori curse. Such stories are dismissed by local Māori. The island is famous for the discovery of a burial site of a Māori woman in 1967, who is known as "the lady of the lake" by Southland locals. The burial site is in a cave on the eastern side of the island. Believed to have been placed on the burial site sometime between the late 16th century and 17th century, possibly around 1660, the woman was laid to rest wearing a flax cloak and a dog skin collar with weka feather edging around her neck, and was seated upright on a bier made of sticks and leaves. The reasons for the burial in this manner are uncertain, although it has been suggested that these burials were to either make sure the remains were protected from desecration by enemies, or to protect living descendants from a dangerous "tapu" (sacred, forbidden or taboo) that Māori may have believed the ancestral bones possessed. This led to the belief that this woman was of high-ranking status, and it was later discovered through an archaeological investigation that she was a chieftain of the Ngāti Mamoe tribe. The burial remains on the island today, with a grille made of steel and wire mesh ensuring that people can still view the burial, but the woman will remain untouched.

== Natural history ==
Trees are mainly mataī, tōtara, rimu, tawhai pango, tawhai, Pseudopanax linearis and rautawhiri (Pittosporum Colensoi).

The lake is one of the few not yet colonised by invasive water weeds, except the bulbous rush, Juncus bulbosus, so it retains plants such as Nitella stuartii algae, Callitriche petriei water-starwort, Isoetes kirkii quillwort, Pilularia novaezelandiae pillwort fern, Trithuria inconspicua waterlilies and Charales fibrosa.

Pests include stoats and possums, which arrived in the 1990s. They are controlled by trapping, bait stations and periodic 1080 drops.

== See also ==
- Lakes of New Zealand
- List of lakes of New Zealand
