= Percy Burn Viaduct =

Bridge in New Zealand

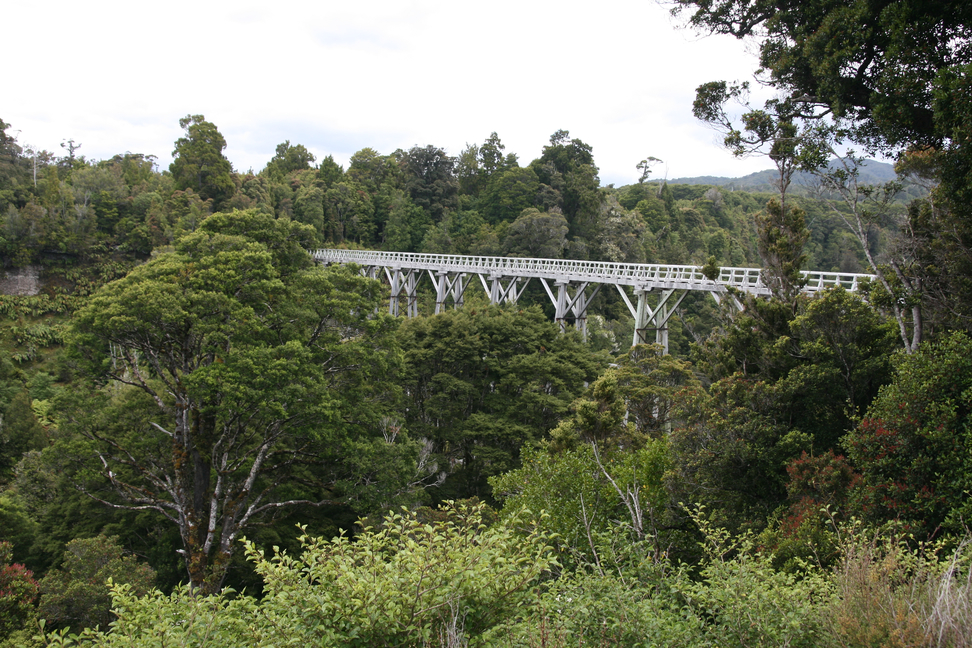
- Coordinates: 46.241086°S 167.303951°E
- Carries: Pedestrians on the Hump Ridge Track
- Crosses: Percy Burn
- Locale: Fiordland, New Zealand

Characteristics
- Design: Trestle
- Material: Timber
- Total length: 125 metres (410 ft)
- Height: 36 metres (118 ft)

History
- Opened: 1923
- Closed: 1928

Location
- Interactive map of Percy Burn Viaduct

Percy Burn Viaduct is located in the far south of the South Island of New Zealand. It is reputedly the largest surviving wooden viaduct in the world. A former logging tramway, it is now a footbridge and the most popular feature of the Tuatapere Hump Ridge Track.

During the early years of the twentieth century, logging companies exploited much of the native timber of New Zealand. The Marlborough Timber Company, one of the country's largest forestry companies, was looking for new areas of forest to mill, and managed to secure the logging rights to an inhospitable and difficult to access area of timber close to Te Waewae Bay in the island's southwestern corner. The main timber milled was rimu.

Access was originally only available by ship, and a wharf and settlement were built at Port Craig, but 25 kilometres of bush tramway were still needed to transport logs to the wharf. These had to cross four large, deep burns, and four large wood-trestle viaducts were built to accomplish this. The largest of these crossed the Percy Burn. Built in 1923, it was 125 metres in length and 36 metres high.

Unfortunately for the company, the timber was not of high quality and proved costly to log. Coupled with falling timber prices (due to the improvement of access between the South Island's cities and the heavily forested West Coast with the completion of the Otira Tunnel), the Port Craig operation was quickly in trouble and was abandoned in 1928, just as maximum timber production had been achieved.

Restoration of the viaduct took place during the 1990s, as part of work on the new Hump Ridge walking track. Further restoration work was undertaken jointly by the Department of Conservation, Southland District Council and the Port Craig Viaducts Trust in the mid-2010s.

== Closure and Restoration ==
The viaduct, which formed part of the Hump Ridge Track and South Coast Track, was closed to public access in May 2013 due to rotting timber and other safety concerns. An alternate route bypassing the viaduct was constructed by the Department of Conservation.

Its fate was unknown until February 2014 when the Department of Conservation and Environment Southland pledged NZ$480,000 to restore it and the other three viaducts on the former logging rail line. As of April 2014 the bridge was closed and restoration work had not begun. Reopening was expected in 2018. The viaduct reopened in late 2018.
