= Lake Poteriteri =

Large lake in Fiordland National Park in New Zealand's South Island

- Potiritiri
- Lake Poteriteri

- Location within South Island
- Interactive map of Lake Poteriteri
- Location: Fiordland, Southland District, North Island
- Coordinates: 46.02°S 167.114°E
- Primary inflows: Princess Burn
- Primary outflows: Waitutu River
- Basin countries: New Zealand
- Max. length: 28 km (17 mi)
- Surface area: 43 km^{2} (17 sq mi)
- Average depth: 113.1 m (371 ft)
- Water volume: 4.86 km^{3} (1.17 cu mi)
- Surface elevation: 30 m (98 ft)

Lake Poteriteri is the southernmost of the large lakes in Fiordland National Park in New Zealand's South Island. Only Lakes Hakapoua and Innes lie further south on the southern of New Zealand's two main islands. It is located 40 kilometres (25 mi) to the west of the town of Tuatapere.

Lying in a steep-sided mountain valley, Poteriteri runs roughly north–south for a distance of 28 kilometres (17 mi) with an average width of under 2 kilometres (1.2 mi). It covers an area of 43 square kilometres (17 sq mi). The outflow of Poteriteri is the Waitutu River, a short 8 kilometres (5.0 mi) river which flows into the western end of Foveaux Strait.

The naming of the lake is unclear. The Māori word may mean 'to drift forwards and backwards', with another theory that the spelling of the lake should be Poutiritiri, which would translate as a 'post on which offerings are hung'. A third theory is that the spelling should be Poeteretere, in which case it would mean 'dripping wet'.

Access to the lake is via helicopter, a rough deer trail from Slaughter Burn or Harry's Track, a marked route from the outlet of Lake Hauroko.

== See also ==
- Lakes of New Zealand
- List of lakes of New Zealand
