= Southland Region =

Region of New Zealand

Coordinates: 45.7°S 168.1°E

Southland Māori: Murihiku
- Region
- Southland Region
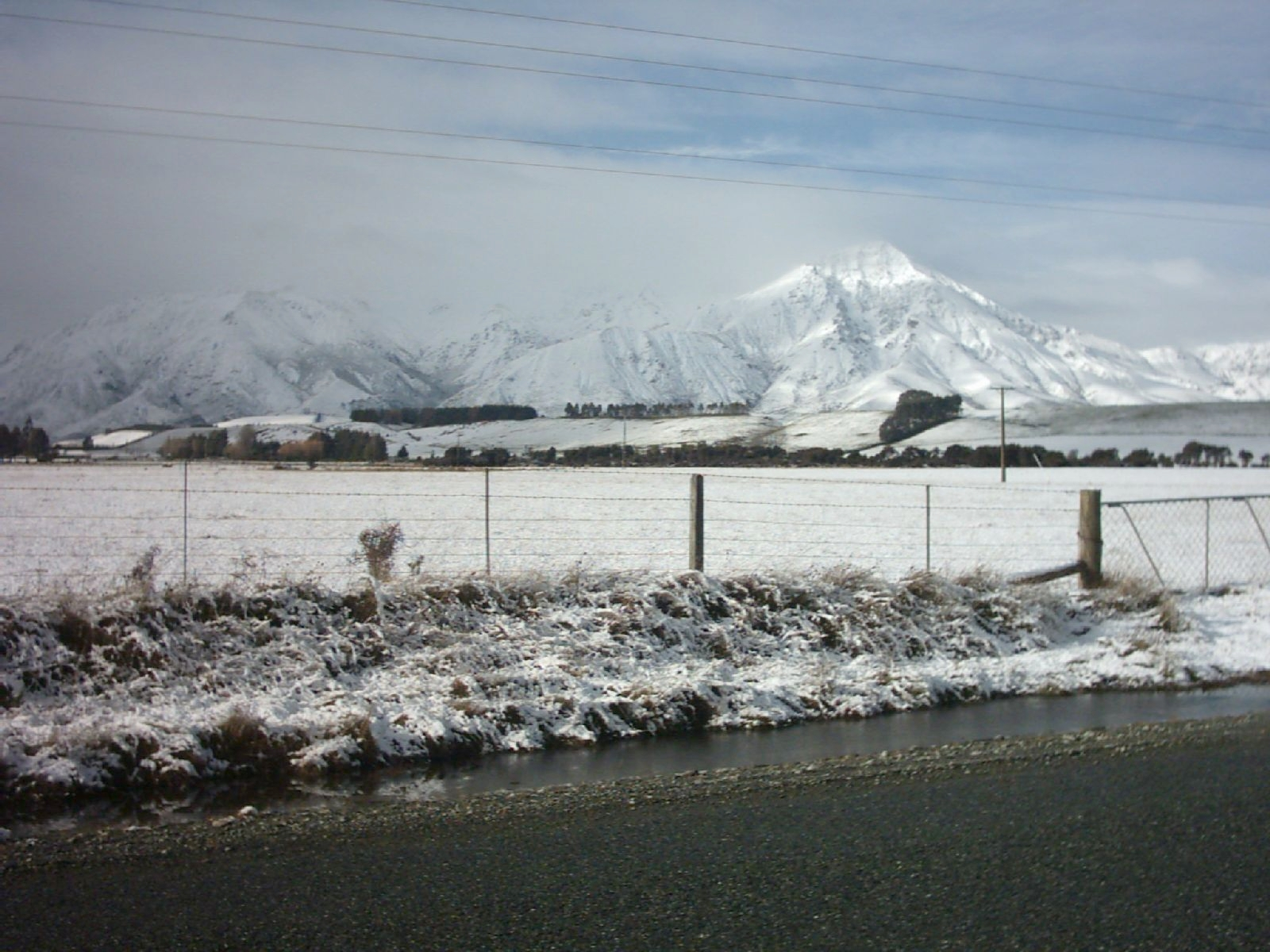
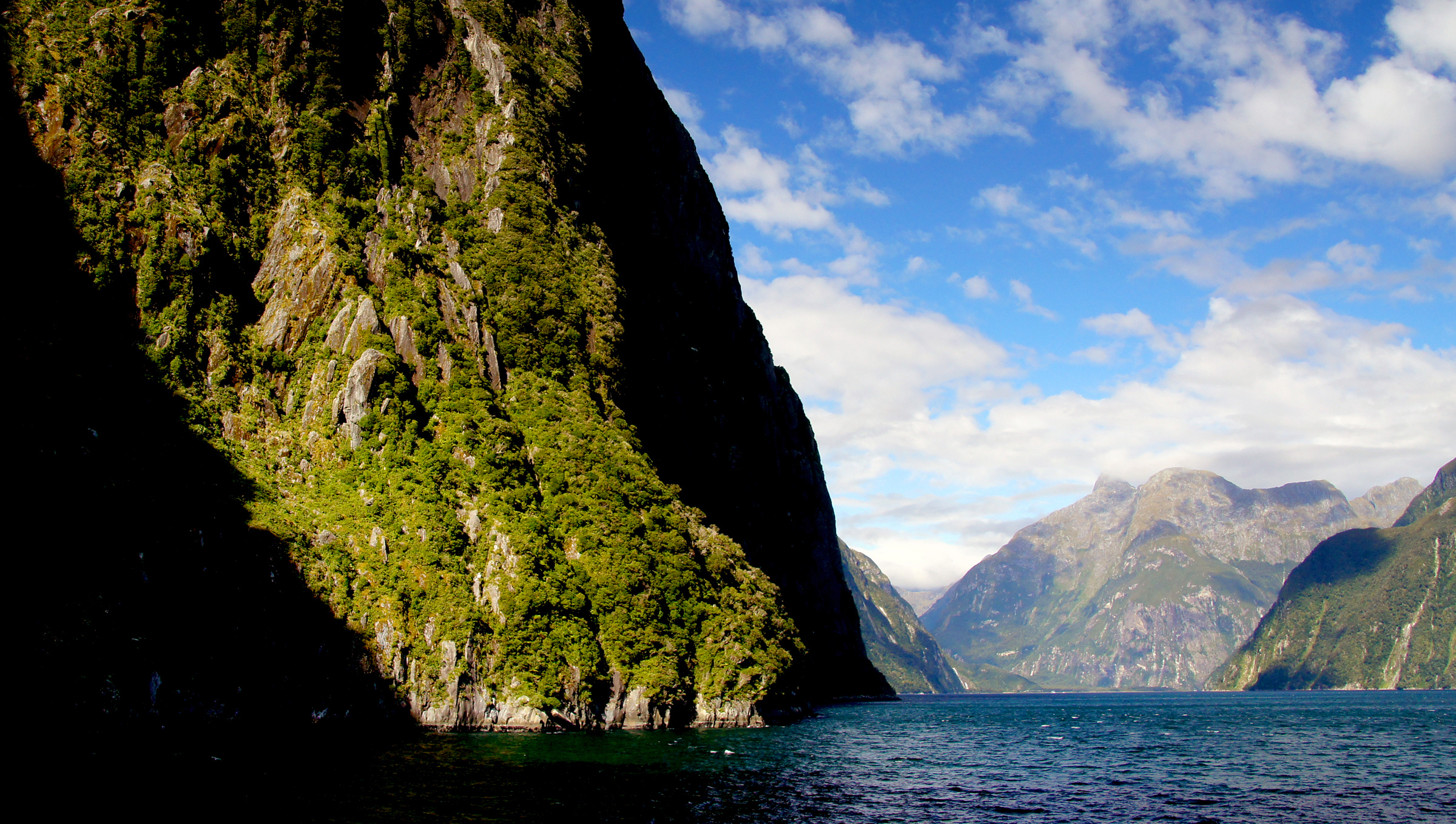
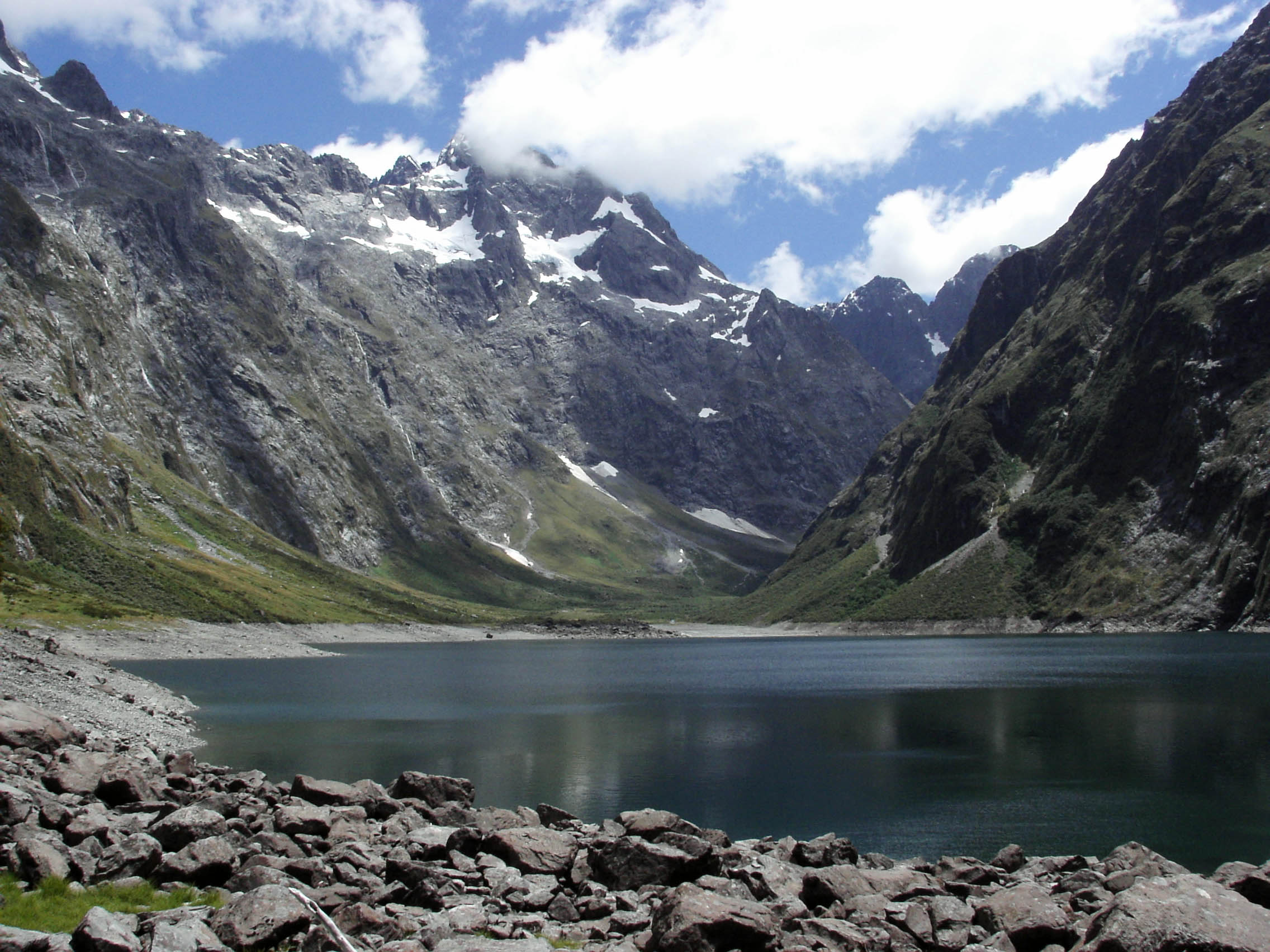
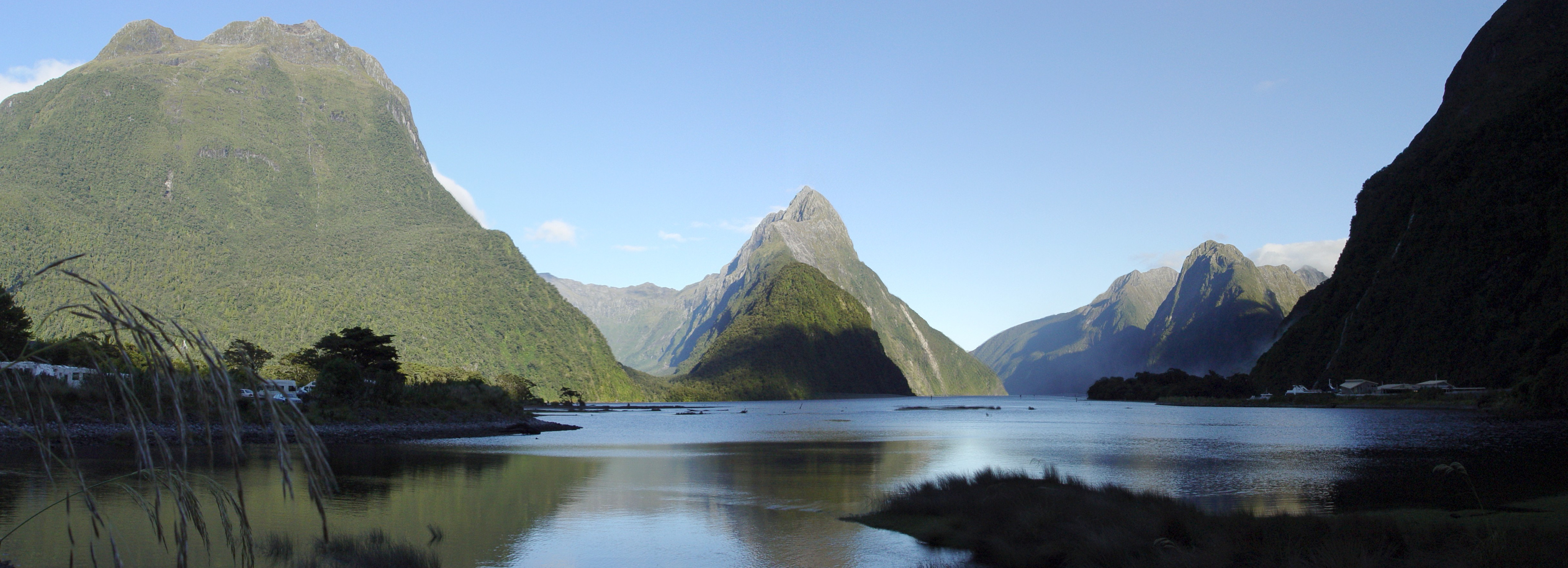
- From top to bottom, left to right: A winter scene in western Southland, Milford Sound, Lake Marian, and Doubtful Sound in Fiordland

- Southland within New Zealand
- Country: New Zealand
- Island: South Island and Stewart Island
- Established: 1861 (provincial); 1989 (reformation)
- Seat: Invercargill
- Territorial authorities: List: Southland District; Gore District; Invercargill City

Government
  - Body: Southland Regional Council
  - Chair: Jeremy McPhail
  - Deputy Chair: Phil Morrison

Area
  - Land: 31,218.95 km^{2} (12,053.70 sq mi)

Population (June 2025)
  - Region: 104,800
  - Density: 3.357/km^{2} (8.694/sq mi)

GDP
  - Total: NZ$ 7.396 billion (2021) (11th)
  - Per capita: NZ$ 72,223 (2021)
- Time zone: UTC+12 (NZST)
  - Summer (DST): UTC+13 (NZDT)
- HDI (2023): 0.928 very high · 10th
- Website: https://www.es.govt.nz/

Southland (Māori: Murihiku, lit. 'the last joint of the tail') is New Zealand's southernmost region. It consists of the southwestern portion of the South Island and includes Stewart Island. Southland is bordered by the culturally similar Otago Region to the north and east, and the West Coast Region in the extreme northwest. The region covers over 3.1 million hectares and spans 3,613 km of coastline. As of June 2023, Southland has a population of 103,900, making it the eleventh-most-populous New Zealand region, and the second-most sparsely populated. Approximately half of the region's population lives in Invercargill, Southland's only city.

The earliest inhabitants of Southland were Māori of the Waitaha iwi, followed later by Kāti Māmoe and Kāi Tahu. Early European arrivals were sealers and whalers, and by the 1830s, Kāi Tahu had built a thriving industry supplying whaling vessels, looked after whalers and settlers in need, and had begun to integrate with the settlers. By the second half of the 19th century these industries had declined, and immigrants, predominantly Scottish settlers, had moved further inland. The region maintains a strong cultural identity, including its own distinct dialect of English and strong influences from its Māori and Scottish heritage.

Southland extends from Fiordland in the west past the Mataura River to the Catlins the east. It contains New Zealand's highest waterfall, the Browne Falls, and its deepest lake, Lake Hauroko. Fiordland's terrain is dominated by mountains, fiords and glacial lakes carved up by glaciations during the last ice age, between 75,000 and 15,000 years ago. The region's coast is dotted by several fiords and other sea inlets which stretch from Milford Sound in the north to Preservation Inlet to the south. Farther north and east in Fiordland lie the Darran and Eyre Mountains which are part of the block of schist that extends into neighbouring Central Otago. The region is rich in natural resources, with large reserves of forestry, coal, petroleum and natural gas.

== History ==
The earliest inhabitants of the region—known to Māori as Murihiku ('the last joint of the tail')—were Māori of the Waitaha iwi, followed later by Kāti Māmoe and Kāi Tahu. Waitaha sailed on the Uruao waka, whose captain Rākaihautū named sites and carved out lakes throughout the area. The Takitimu Mountains were formed by the overturned Kāi Tahu waka Tākitimu. Descendants created networks of customary food gathering sites, travelling seasonally as needed, to support permanent and semi-permanent settlements in coastal and inland regions.

In later years, the coastline was a scene of early extended contact between Māori and Europeans, in this case sealers, whalers and missionaries such as Wohlers at Ruapuke Island. Contact was established as early as 1813. By the 1830s, Kāi Tahu had built a thriving industry supplying whaling vessels, looked after whalers and settlers in need, and had begun to integrate with the settlers. Throughout the nineteenth century local Māori continued such regular travel from trade that a "Māori house" had to be built in 1881 to accommodate them when they travelled from Ruapuke and Stewart Island to Bluff to sell produce.

On 10 June 1840, Tūhawaiki, a paramount chief of Kāi Tahu, signed the Treaty of Waitangi aboard HMS Herald at Ruapuke. Aware that this treaty did not guarantee him sovereignty over his land he had previously asserted that he would sign it if those bringing it to him would sign one he had prepared himself.

In 1853, Walter Mantell purchased Murihiku from local Māori iwi, claiming the land for European settlement. Part of the agreement was that schools and hospitals would be provided alongside each Kāi Tahu village; this promise was not fulfilled. The boundaries of the land sold were also not made sufficiently clear, with Kāi Tahu always maintaining that Fiordland was not intended to be included in this purchase.

Over successive decades, present-day Southland and Otago were settled by large numbers of Scottish settlers. Immigration to New Zealand had been precipitated by an economic depression in Scotland and a schism between the Church of Scotland and the Free Church of Scotland.

In 1852, James Menzies, leader of the Southland separatist movement, became the first Superintendent of the tiny Southland electorate which was still part of the large Otago region. Under the influence of Menzies, Southland Province (a small part of the present Region, centred on Invercargill) seceded from Otago in 1861 following the escalation of political tensions.

However, rising debt forced Southland to rejoin Otago in 1870, and the province was abolished entirely when the Abolition of the Provinces Act came into force on 1 November 1876.

In the 1880s, the development of an export industry based on butter and cheese encouraged the growth of dairy farming in Southland. Consequently, the colony's first dairy factory was established at Edendale in 1882. Much of this export went to the United Kingdom.

Now, Edendale is the site of the world's largest raw milk-processing plant, and Southland's economy is based on agriculture, tourism, fishing, forestry, coal, and hydropower.

Southland region and the Southland Regional Council were created in 1989, as part of the 1989 local government reforms.

== Structure ==
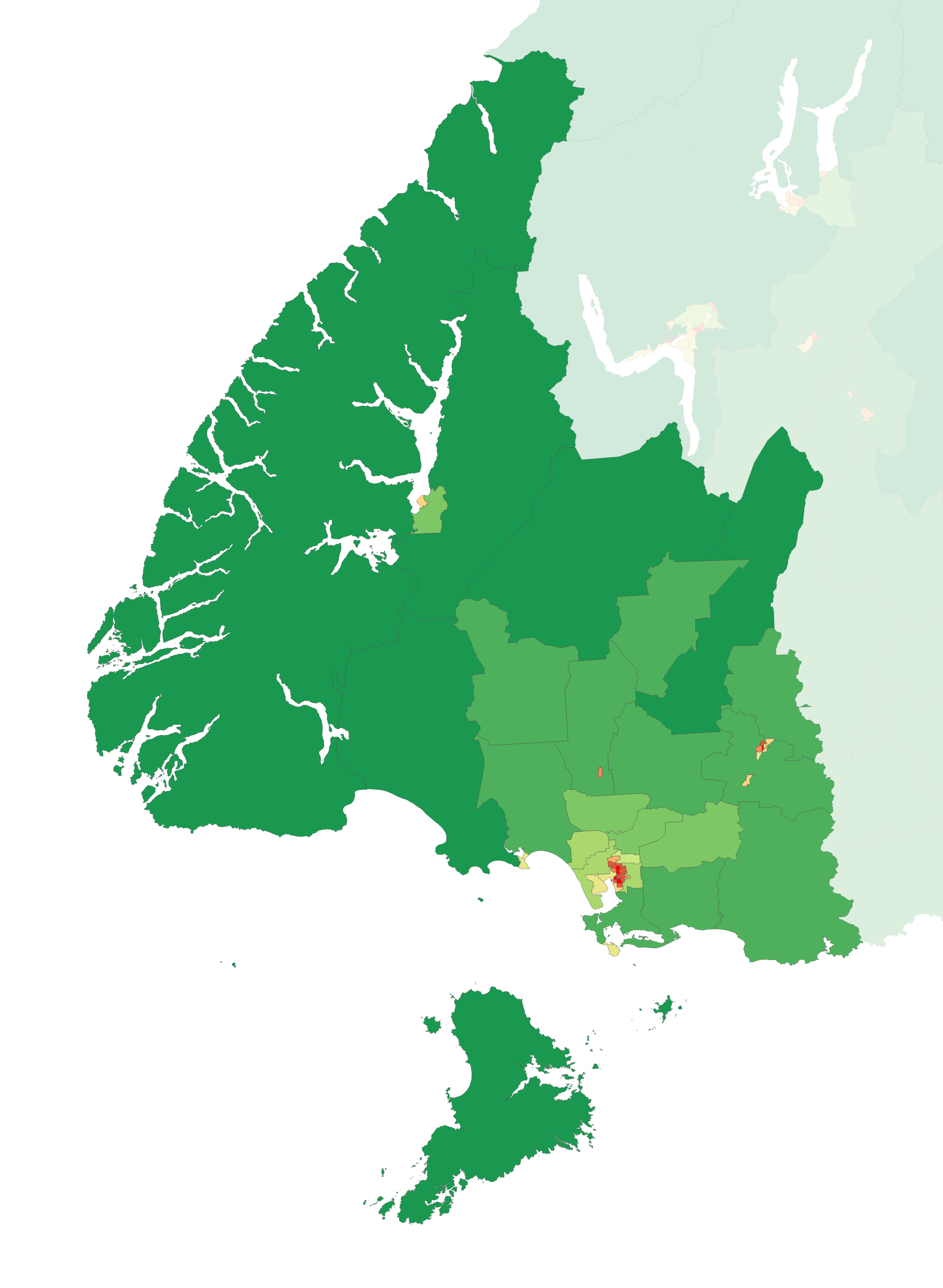
A map showing population density in the Southland region at the 2023 census.

=== Representation ===
Southland is divided into two parliamentary electorates. The large rural electorate of Southland, held by Joseph Mooney of the New Zealand National Party, also includes some of the neighbouring Otago Region. The seat of Invercargill is held by Penny Simmonds of the New Zealand National Party. Under the Māori electorates system, Southland is part of the large Te Tai Tonga electorate which covers the entire South Island and the surrounding islands, and is currently held by Tākuta Ferris of Independent politician.

=== Local government ===
Regional responsibilities are handled by the Southland Regional Council (Environment Southland). Three territorial authorities fall entirely within Southland. The Invercargill City Council governs Invercargill itself, together with some adjoining rural areas. Much of the remaining area of Southland, including all of Stewart Island, falls within the Southland District, which is administered by its own Council, also based in Invercargill. The Gore District Council administers the Gore township and its rural hinterland. In 2001, the three authorities (Invercargill City, Southland District and Gore District Councils) created the joint initiative agency Venture Southland which is the agency responsible for the region's economic and community development initiatives and tourism promotion.

=== National parks ===
The region is home to two national parks: Fiordland National Park and Rakiura National Park. The former which covers 7,860 square kilometres; making it New Zealand's largest national park. Southland also includes Stewart Island, 85% of which is covered by Rakiura National Park. Both parks are administrated by the Department of Conservation.

== Geography ==
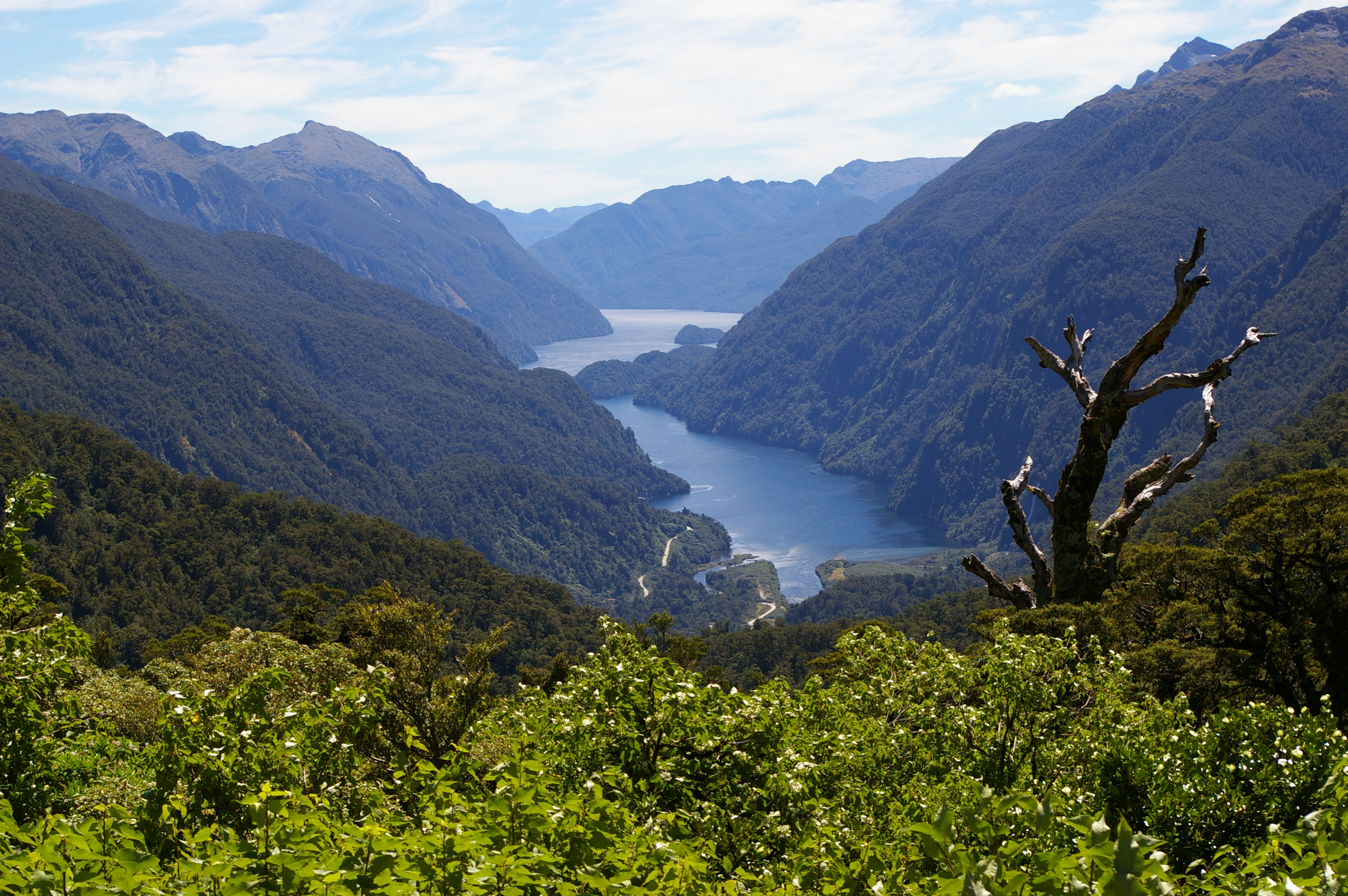
Doubtful Sound

Politically, Southland proper extends from Fiordland in the west past the Mataura River to the Catlins the east. To the north, Southland is framed by the Darran and Eyre Mountains. Farther south lies Stewart Island which is separated from the mainland by the Foveaux Strait.

Southland contains New Zealand's highest waterfall—the Browne Falls. Lake Hauroko is the deepest lake in the country. The highest peak in Southland is Mount Tūtoko, which is part of the Darran mountains. The largest lake in Southland is Lake Te Anau followed by Lake Manapouri which both lie within the boundaries of Fiordland National Park. Established on 20 February 1905, it is the largest national park in New Zealand—covering much of Fiordland which is devoid of human settlement.

Fiordland's terrain is dominated by mountains, fiords and glacial lakes carved up by glaciations during the last ice age, between 75,000 and 15,000 years ago. The region's coast is dotted by several fiords and other sea inlets which stretch from Milford Sound in the north to Preservation Inlet to the south. Farther north and east in Fiordland lie the Darran and Eyre Mountains which are part of the block of schist that extends into neighbouring Central Otago.

Farther east of the Waiau River, the Southland Plains predominate which include some of New Zealand's most fertile farmlands. The region's two principal settlements Invercargill and Gore are located on the plains. The plains extend from the Waiau River in the west to the Mataura River to the east. It can be divided into three broad areas: the Southland plain proper, the Waimea Plains and the lower Waiau plain to the west near the Waiau river. The southern part of these plains (including the Awarua Plains along the coast east of Bluff) contains much wetland and swamp.

In the far southeast of Southland rises the rough hill country of the Catlins. This area is divided between Southland and the neighbouring Otago region, with the largest settlement, Owaka, being within Otago. The hills of the Catlins form part of a major geological fold system, the Southland Syncline, which extends from the coast northwestward, and include the Hokonui Hills above Gore.

Off the coast of Southland lies the Great South Basin which stretches over 500,000 square kilometres (190,000 sq mi)—an area 1.5 times New Zealand's land mass. It is one of the country's largest undeveloped offshore petroleum basins with prospects for both oil and gas.

=== Groundwater ===
Drinking water for much of the Southland population is sourced from groundwater. A report published in 2026 via Environment Southland revealed increasing nitrate contamination in Southland's groundwater, with approximately 15,000 people in the area exposed to drinking water polluted by nitrates. Many sites show long-term deterioration. The report identified intensive dairy farming and the nitrate excretion from urinating cows as a key contributor to the high nitrate levels. International studies have linked nitrate contamination to preterm birth, blue baby syndrome and colorectal cancer. There have been calls for the declaration of a nitrate emergency in the area.

In Gore, the region's largest town, nitrate levels above the legal national limit of 11.3 mg/L were recorded in the groundwater which supplies the town with drinking water in July 2025. A measurement of 13.83 mg/L was recorded in early 2026.

In May 2026, it was reported that nitrate levels in Lumsden's water supply had tested at 6.14 mg per litre, below the national limit, but exceeding the 5 mg/L threshold for increased risk of preterm birth.

== Climate ==
Weather conditions in Southland are cooler than the other regions of New Zealand due to its distance from the equator. However, they can be broken down into three types: the temperate oceanic climate of the coastal regions, the semi-continental climate of the interior and the wetter mountain climate of Fiordland to the west. Due to its closer proximity to the South Pole, the Aurora Australis or "Southern Lights" are more commonly seen than in other regions.

The coastal regions have mild summers and cool winters. The mean daily temperature varies from 5.2 °C in July to 14.9 °C in January. Rainfall varies from 900 mm to 1300 mm annually with rainfall being more frequent in coastal areas and rainbows being a regular occurrence in the region. Summers are temperable with downpours and cold snaps not being uncommon. On 7 January 2010, Invercargill was hit by a hail storm with temperatures plummeting rapidly from 15 °C to 8 °C in the afternoon. Occasionally, temperatures exceed 25 °C with an extreme temperature of 33.8 °C having been reached before in Invercargill in 1948 and 35.0 °C in Winton in 2018.

Winters are colder and more severe than other regions, although not by much. The mean maximum temperature in July is 9.5 °C and Southland's lowest recorded temperature was −18 °C in July 1946. Snow and frost also frequently occur in inland areas but are less common and extreme in coastal areas where the oceans act as a moderating factor. The long-lasting cool and wet conditions are influenced by the presence of a stationary low-pressure zone to the southeast of the country.

Fiordland has a wet mountain climate though conditions vary due to altitude and exposure. Rainfall is the highest in the country and varies between 6,500 and 7,500 mm annually. The farthest coastal reaches of Fiordland are characterised by a limited temperature range with increasing rainfall at higher altitudes. The moist wet climate is influenced by approaching low-pressure systems which sweep across the country entering Fiordland.

== Demographics ==
Southland region covers 31,218.95 km^{2} (12,053.70 sq mi). It has an estimated population of 104,800 as of June 2025, 2.0% of New Zealand's population. It is the country's second-most sparsely populated region (after the West Coast), with 3.36 people per square kilometre (8.69 per square mile).

Historical population
| Year | Pop. | ±% p.a. |
|---|---|---|
| 1991 | 99,954 | — |
| 1996 | 97,098 | −0.58% |
| 2001 | 91,002 | −1.29% |
| 2006 | 90,876 | −0.03% |
| 2013 | 93,342 | +0.38% |
| 2018 | 97,467 | +0.87% |
| 2023 | 100,143 | +0.54% |
Source: Statistics NZ

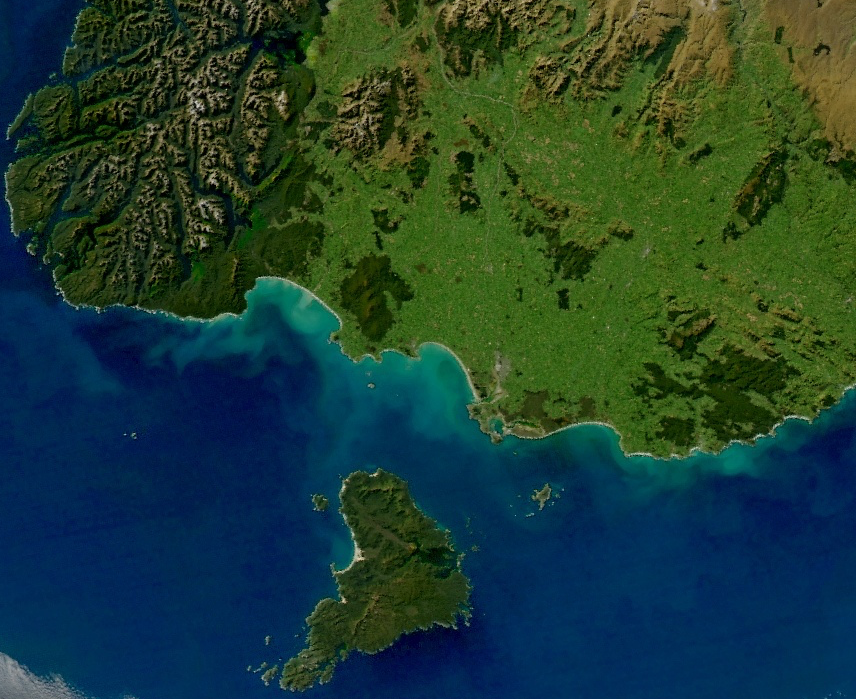
Satellite image of most of New Zealand's Southland region, including Stewart Island and southern Fiordland.

Southland region had a population of 100,143 in the 2023 New Zealand census, an increase of 2,676 people (2.7%) since the 2018 census, and an increase of 6,801 people (7.3%) since the 2013 census. There were 50,115 males, 49,704 females and 321 people of other genders in 41,070 dwellings. 2.6% of people identified as LGBTIQ+. The median age was 40.4 years (compared with 38.1 years nationally). There were 18,921 people (18.9%) aged under 15 years, 17,208 (17.2%) aged 15 to 29, 45,495 (45.4%) aged 30 to 64, and 18,516 (18.5%) aged 65 or older.

People could identify as more than one ethnicity. The results were 84.1% European (Pākehā); 16.8% Māori; 3.3% Pasifika; 7.1% Asian; 1.0% Middle Eastern, Latin American and African New Zealanders (MELAA); and 3.0% other, which includes people giving their ethnicity as "New Zealander". English was spoken by 97.3%, Māori language by 3.1%, Samoan by 0.5% and other languages by 7.2%. No language could be spoken by 1.9% (e.g. too young to talk). New Zealand Sign Language was known by 0.5%. The percentage of people born overseas was 14.4, compared with 28.8% nationally.

Religious affiliations were 33.1% Christian, 0.8% Hindu, 0.4% Islam, 0.5% Māori religious beliefs, 0.6% Buddhist, 0.4% New Age, and 1.1% other religions. People who answered that they had no religion were 54.9%, and 8.3% of people did not answer the census question.

Of those at least 15 years old, 10,104 (12.4%) people had a bachelor's or higher degree, 45,333 (55.8%) had a post-high school certificate or diploma, and 22,866 (28.2%) people exclusively held high school qualifications. The median income was $41,100, compared with $41,500 nationally. 6,549 people (8.1%) earned over $100,000 compared to 12.1% nationally. The employment status of those at least 15 was that 43,197 (53.2%) people were employed full-time, 11,688 (14.4%) were part-time, and 1,749 (2.2%) were unemployed.

A relatively high proportion of nineteenth century migrants came from Scotland and Ireland. Māori are largely concentrated around the port of Bluff. During the 1940s, the development of the freezing works boosted a short-term immigration to the region by North Island Māori.

In the 21st century the Asian-origin population of Southland increased owing to the recruitment of dairy workers, many of them from the Philippines. In 2013 the population of Asian origin accounted for 3.2% of the Southland total.

The West Coast aside, Southland has New Zealand's strongest regional identity. It is the only part of New Zealand which has a distinct regional accent (shared with most rural parts of Otago), characterised in particular by a rolling 'r'. Food-wise, cheese rolls are a Southland specialty and swedes are a popular vegetable, prepared and eaten as are pumpkin and kūmara (sweet potato) elsewhere in New Zealand. For many years a television channel, known as Southland TV from 2003 to 2007, later Cue TV, transmitted Southland content. The strength of Southland identity may owe something to the relatively high proportion of New Zealand-born in the region – 85% compared with 70% for New Zealand as a whole at the 2013 census.

=== Cities and towns ===
With a population of 51,200 Invercargill, the region's main centre and seat of local government, makes up half of Southland's total. Six other centres have populations over 1,000: Gore, Mataura, Winton, Riverton, Bluff and Te Anau. Most of Southland's population is concentrated on the eastern Southland Plains. Fiordland, the western part of the region, is almost totally devoid of permanent human settlement.

Largest urban areas in Southland
| Name | Population (June 2025) | % of region |
|---|---|---|
| Invercargill | 51,200 | 48.9% |
| Gore | 8,310 | 7.9% |
| Te Anau | 2,920 | 2.8% |
| Winton | 2,560 | 2.4% |
| Bluff | 1,840 | 1.8% |
| Mataura | 1,670 | 1.6% |
| Riverton | 1,700 | 1.6% |
| Otautau | 800 | 0.8% |
| Wallacetown | 750 | 0.7% |
| Edendale | 640 | 0.6% |

== Economy ==
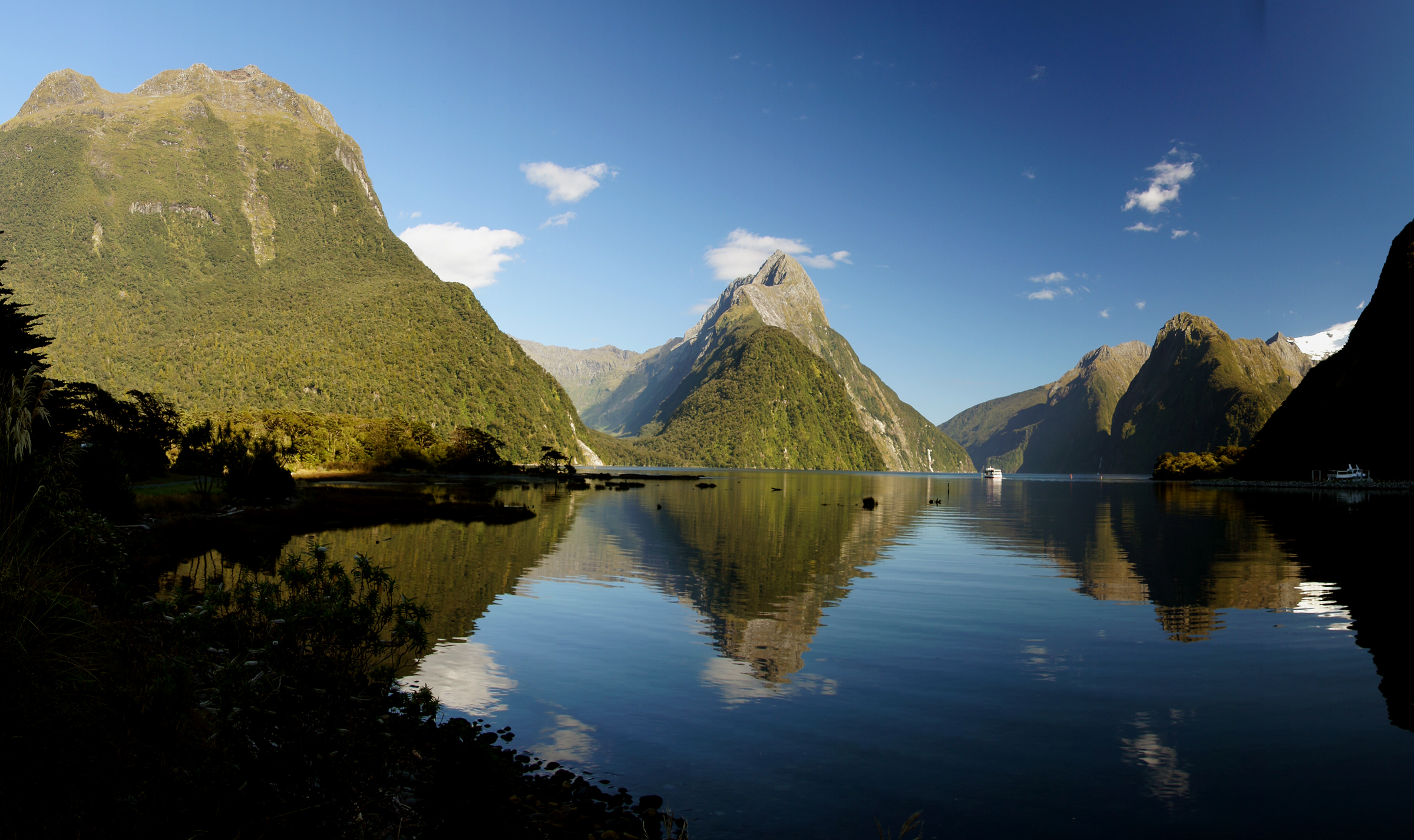
Fiordland National Park

The subnational gross domestic product (GDP) of Southland was estimated at NZ$6.36 billion in the year to March 2019, 2.1% of New Zealand's national GDP. The subnational GDP per capita was estimated at $63,084 in the same period. In the year to March 2018, primary industries contributed $1.35 billion (22.4%) to the regional GDP, goods-producing industries contributed $1.52 billion (25.2%), service industries contributed $2.63 billion (43.7%), and taxes and duties contributed $516 million (8.6%).

The region's economy is based on agriculture, tourism, fishing, forestry and energy resources like coal and hydropower.

The agriculture industry includes both sheep and dairy farming which both account for a significant proportion of the region's revenue and export receipts. Much of this farming is on the Southland Plains, with expansion into the more remote western regions since the 1950s and 1960s. Southland also has the world's largest raw milk-processing plant at the town of Edendale which was established by Fonterra. In the 2019–20 season, there were 591,600 milking cows in Southland, 12.0% of the country's total herd. The cows produced 247,230 tonnes of milk solids, worth $1,780 million at the national average farmgate price ($7.20 per kg).

Other sizeable industries in Southland include coal and hydroelectric power. Eastern Southland has significant deposits of lignite which are considered to be New Zealand's biggest fossil fuel energy resource. Solid Energy operated open cast lignite mines at Newvale and Ohai until its 2015 bankruptcy.

Southland hosts the nation's largest hydroelectric power station at Manapouri which is owned by Meridian Energy and powers the Tiwai Point Aluminium Smelter. The Manapouri project generated much controversy from environmental groups which initiated the Save Manapouri Campaign in opposition to rising water levels in nearby lakes.

In 2026 it was announced that a datacenter will be built in Southland at a cost of $3 billion dollars and be New Zealand's second largest consumer of electricity after Tiwai Point.

Tourism spending is a major factor of the Southland economy, with NZ$595 million being spent by visitors in 2016, of which $210 million was spent in the Fiordland area. In July 2007 the New Zealand Government awarded oil and gas exploration permits for four areas of the Great South Basin. The three successful permit holders were ExxonMobil New Zealand, OMV and Greymouth Petroleum.

== See also ==
- Southland Museum and Art Gallery
- Southland Rugby Football Union
- Southland temperate forests
- Rural Heritage Southland
- List of shipwrecks of Southland
