= Wairaurāhiri River =

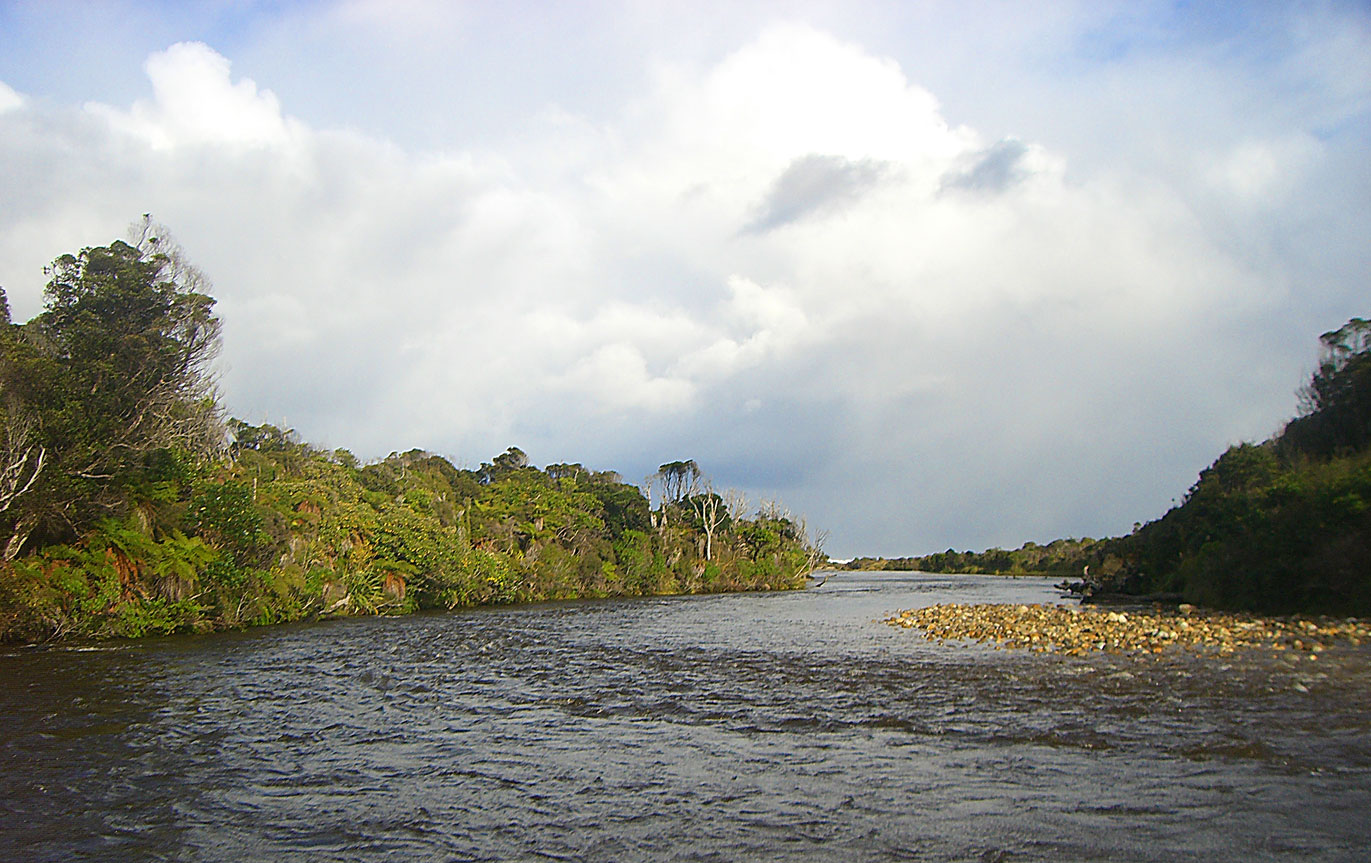
- Mouth of the Wairaurāhiri River
- Route of the Wairaurāhiri River
- Mouth of the Wairaurāhiri River Wairaurāhiri River (South Island)

Location
- Country: New Zealand

Physical characteristics
- Source: Lake Hauroko
  - coordinates: 46°04′42″S 167°17′02″E
  - elevation: 157 m (515 ft)
- Mouth
  - location: Foveaux Strait
  - coordinates: 46°15′44″S 167°12′57″E
  - elevation: 0 m (0 ft)
- Length: 27 km (17 mi)

Basin features
- Progression: Wairaurāhiri River → Foveaux Strait
- Tributaries
  - left: Waitapu Stream, Kaikokopu Stream, Waikakapo Stream, Wairere Stream, Kaituna Stream
  - right: Rata Burn

The Wairaurāhiri River is a river in southern Fiordland, New Zealand, draining Lake Hauroko into the sea. Many boats have got into trouble along its length, as the river flows quite quickly with grade-3 rapids, so the main boats that use the river are commercial jetboats. There is a 157-metre (515 ft) drop from the source at Lake Hauroko to the mouth, which empties into Foveaux Strait.

There is an active stoat and rat trapping program set up along the length of the river and maintained by locals. Possums were plentiful in the area as early as 1900.
