= State Highway 99 (New Zealand) =

Road in New Zealand

State Highway 99

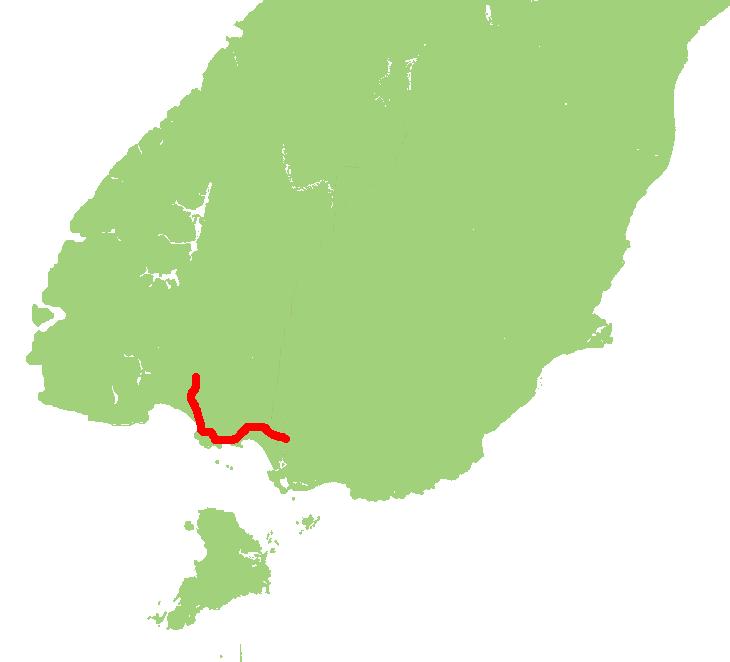

Route information
- Maintained by NZ Transport Agency Waka Kotahi
- Length: 92.4 km (57.4 mi)
- Tourist routes: Southern Scenic Route

Major junctions
- East end: , SH 6 north, SH 98 (Lorne Dacre Road) and SH 6 south (North Road) at Lorneville
- Northwest end: Clifden Blackmount Road and Ohai Clifden Highway at Clifden

Location
- Country: New Zealand
- Primary destinations: Wallacetown, Waimatuku, Riverton, Colac Bay, Orepuki, Tuatapere

Highway system
- New Zealand state highways; Motorways and expressways; List
← SH 98	→ SH 1

State Highway 99 (SH 99) is a New Zealand state highway which runs along the southern coastline of the South Island connecting the settlements of Clifden and Lorneville, near Invercargill, via the major town of Riverton in the Southland region. The road is important both as a freight route, especially for logging and agricultural purposes, and as a tourist route; the entire length of the highway is part of the Southern Scenic Route as it provides access to southern parts of Fiordland National Park.

== Route ==
The highway starts at Lorneville (where it continues from State Highway 98), where it passes over the Wairio Branch railway line runs to the north of the Underwood freezing works to arrive in Wallacetown. The road then crosses the Ōreti River and proceeds over gently rolling farmland, passing through Wrights Bush and Waimatuku (and bypassing Waianiwa and Thornbury) until it reaches Riverton, where it crosses the Aparima River. The road begins to get more hilly and after passing through Colac Bay, skirts the boundaries of the Longwood Range. The roads curves more to the north around Pahia and passes through the settlement of Orepuki before turning more inland to run parallel with the Waiau River.

At Tuatapere, the highway turns left to cross the Waiau River and then back to the north before eventually terminating at a T-intersection at Clifden. Of the other two roads at the terminus, one of them connects Clifden to Manapouri and Monowai while the other connects Clifden to Ohai, where the ungazetted road is renumbered State Highway 96.

== See also ==
- List of New Zealand state highways
