= Waipango =

- Location within New Zealand
- Coordinates: 46°15′S 168°01′E
- Country: New Zealand
- Island: South Island
- Region: Southland
- Territorial authority: Southland District
- Time zone: UTC+12 (NZST)
  - Summer (DST): UTC+13 (NZDT)
- Postcode(s): 9883
- Area code: 03
- Local iwi: Ngāi Tahu

Waipango is a farming locality in Southland, New Zealand, on the flat between the lower reaches of the Pourakino and Aparima Rivers. It is 8 km north-west of Riverton, 14 km south-west of Thornbury, and 14 km north-east of Colac Bay. The name, from the Māori language, literally translates as Wai meaning water, and pango meaning black.
