= Waimatuku =

Coordinates: 46°17′55″S 168°09′47″E

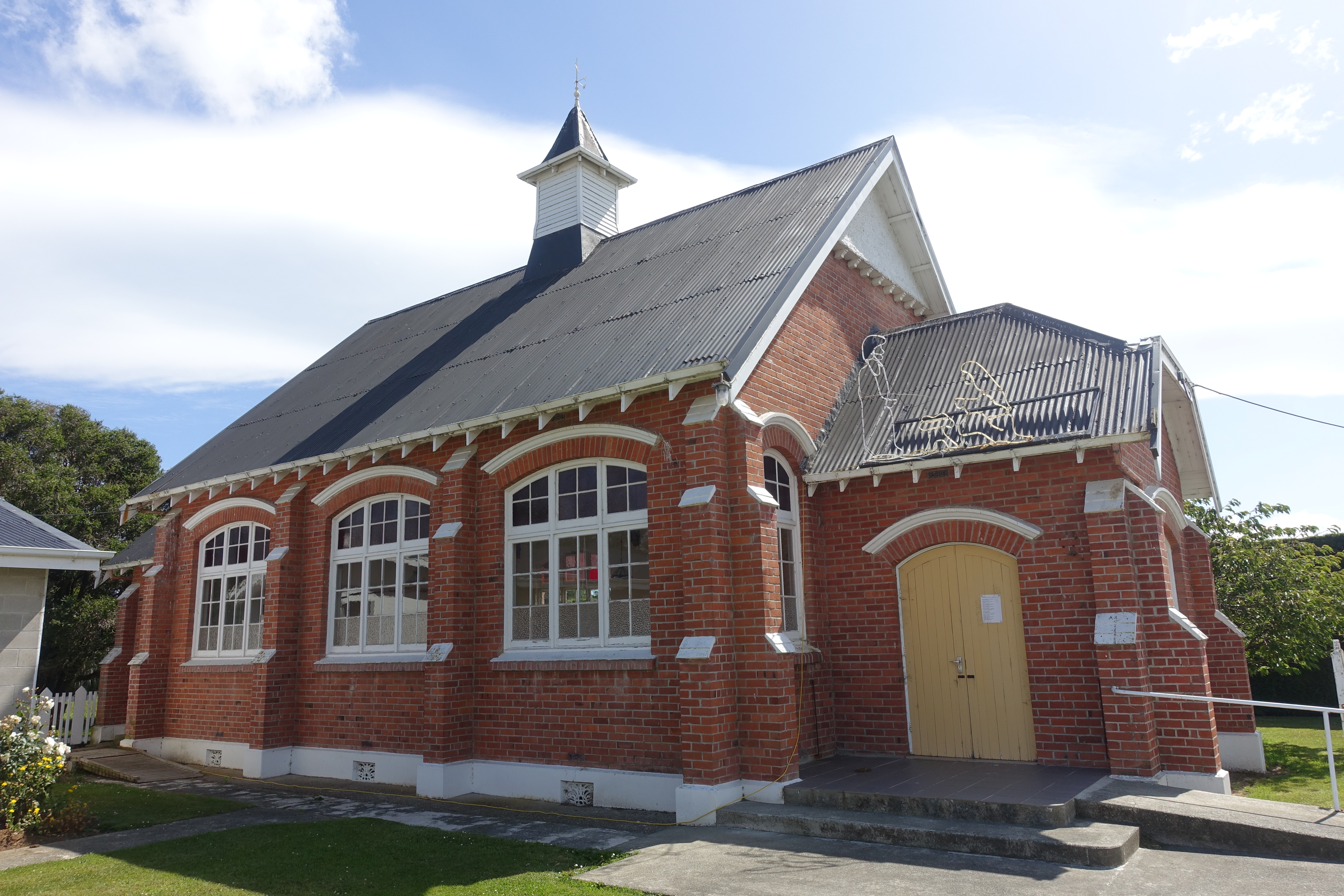
Waimatuku Presbyterian Church

Waimatuku is a small Southland, New Zealand farming community on the Southern Scenic Route, on State Highway 99 between Invercargill and Riverton. The community's name is Māori for "water of the bittern" or "bittern stream".

It is home to the Waimatuku Pipe Band and the Waimatuku Warriors mixed netball team. Traditionally, the area has been a strong sheep farming district, but dairy farming is increasing in popularity.
