= State Highway 98 (New Zealand) =

Road in New Zealand

State Highway 98

Route information
- Maintained by NZ Transport Agency Waka Kotahi
- Length: 21.5 km (13.4 mi)

Major junctions
- West end: SH 6 south (North Road), SH 6 north (Winton Lorneville Highway) and SH 99 (Wallacetown Lorneville Highway) at Lorneville
- East end: SH 1 (Edendale Woodlands Highway) at Dacre

Location
- Country: New Zealand
- Primary destinations: Rakahouka

Highway system
- New Zealand state highways; Motorways and expressways; List
← SH 97	→ SH 99

State Highway 98 (SH 98) is a New Zealand State Highway connecting the settlements of Lorneville (on State Highway 6 just north of Invercargill) and Dacre (on State Highway 1) in the Southland region. Also known as Lorne Dacre Road, the highway was gazetted in 1997 and provides an indirect northern bypass of the city of Invercargill. The road is very flat and passes through primarily prime agricultural land. One locality, Rakahouka, lies halfway along the route.

Beyond Lorneville, SH 98 is renumbered as State Highway 99 and becomes part of the Southern Scenic Route as it continues towards Wallacetown and Riverton.

== See also ==
- List of New Zealand state highways
