= Longwood Range =

Range of hills in Southland, New Zealand

Coordinates: 46°12′S 167°50′E

The Longwood Range is a range of hills to the west of the Southland Plains, Southland, New Zealand. From the 1860s until the 1950s gold mining was prevalent in the Longwood Ranges. There are many small towns and localities situated around the periphery of these hills: clockwise from the south-east, these include Riverton, Pourakino Valley, Colac Bay, Pahia, Orepuki, Tuatapere, Otautau and Thornbury.

Longwood had railway station until 5 November 1972, connected to a 19 km (12 mi) More & Sons bush tramway from 1902 to 1 September 1960.

The Te Araroa Trail runs through the forest.

The highest point of the range is Bald Hill, west of Otautau, and is used for a cellphone tower.
