= Lorneville, New Zealand =

Settlement in Southland, New Zealand

Coordinates: 46°21′S 168°21′E

Lorneville is a small settlement on the northern outskirts of Invercargill, in Southland, New Zealand. It is located on State Highway 6, at the junction with State Highways 98 and 99, and is thus also on the Southern Scenic Route.

It was originally called Wallace Junction or Wallacetown Junction until 1930 after the small settlement of Wallacetown, which lies immediately to the west. It was renamed to Lorneville after the nearby Lorne Farm. Lorneville is the site of a freezing works owned by the Alliance Group farmers' co-operative. Opened on 28 March 1960, three decades after the most recent meatworks, the Lorneville facility is one of the largest in the country. The Meat Board mostly financed its creation via its Meat Industry Reserve Account. As of 2009, its four chains processed eight sheep per minute.
