= Surf To City =

Region Race

- Location: Invercargill, New Zealand

The Surf to City is an annual community participation event held in Invercargill, New Zealand. It involves a scenic route from Oreti Beach to the city's central Queens Park, offering various distances and modes of participation for people of all ages and abilities. It is considered Southland's largest participation event.

== History ==
The event has a long history in the Southland region, evolving to become a significant fixture on the local calendar. Originally conceived as a fun run, it has expanded to include walking and cycling options, emphasizing participation and community engagement over competitive racing.

In December 2015, the Invercargill City Council (ICC) became the naming rights sponsor, highlighting the event's importance to the city's healthy and family-friendly reputation. The ICC's involvement aimed to further boost participation and align with the council's Healthy Families Invercargill initiatives.

Since 2016, the event has been known as the ICC Surf to City. In recent years, Wensley's Cycles has also become a prominent sponsor, and the event is often referred to as Wensley's Cycles Surf to City. The event is organized by Active Southland, a regional sports trust.

== Event Details ==
The Invercargill Surf to City typically takes place in early March. Participants can choose from several distances:

- 12km: Starting at Oreti Beach.
- 6km: Starting at Otatara.
- 3km: Starting on Bond Street.
- iAM Run/Walk in the Park (approx. 1.4km): A shorter, accessible option within Queens Park for individuals living with disabilities.

All events finish at Queens Park, where a festival atmosphere often includes music, food stalls, and family entertainment. The event is not timed, further emphasizing its focus on participation and enjoyment.

== Community impact ==
The Invercargill Surf to City serves as a significant community participation event in the Southland region. Annually, it attracts a wide demographic, including individuals, families, school groups, and workplace teams from Invercargill and the surrounding areas. The event provides an opportunity for physical activity and fosters a sense of community engagement through shared participation.

By offering various distances and modes of participation, the Surf to City aims to be inclusive for people of diverse ages and abilities. The non-competitive nature of the event encourages broad participation, focusing on personal achievement and enjoyment rather than timed results. The route, spanning from the coastal environment of Oreti Beach to the urban parkland of Queens Park, showcases local scenery. The event's presence on the local calendar may contribute to community well-being and social cohesion. The post-event activities in Queens Park, often featuring entertainment and vendors, further contribute to the community atmosphere.
