= Makarewa =

Community in Southland, New Zealand

Coordinates: 46°20′S 168°21′E

Makarewa is a small community north of Invercargill (the southernmost city in the South Island within Southland of New Zealand).

== History ==
Makarewa was formerly the junction of two branch line railways, where the Tuatapere Branch diverged from the Kingston Branch. A third line, the Ohai Branch, left the Tuatapere Branch in Thornbury. On 15 January 1978, the Tuatapere Branch closed beyond Thornbury, and on 13 December 1982, the Kingston Branch closed beyond Makarewa. The line through Makarewa has since been incorporated into the Ohai Branch and only freight services operate.

== Education ==
Makarewa School is a contributing primary school for years 1 to 6 with a roll of 158 students as of July 2025. The school was established in 1887, replacing a previous school in Waikiwi. In 1904, there were about 100 children attending.
