= Southern Scenic Route =

Road in New Zealand

Coordinates: 46°08′0″S 167°41′0″E

Southern Scenic Route

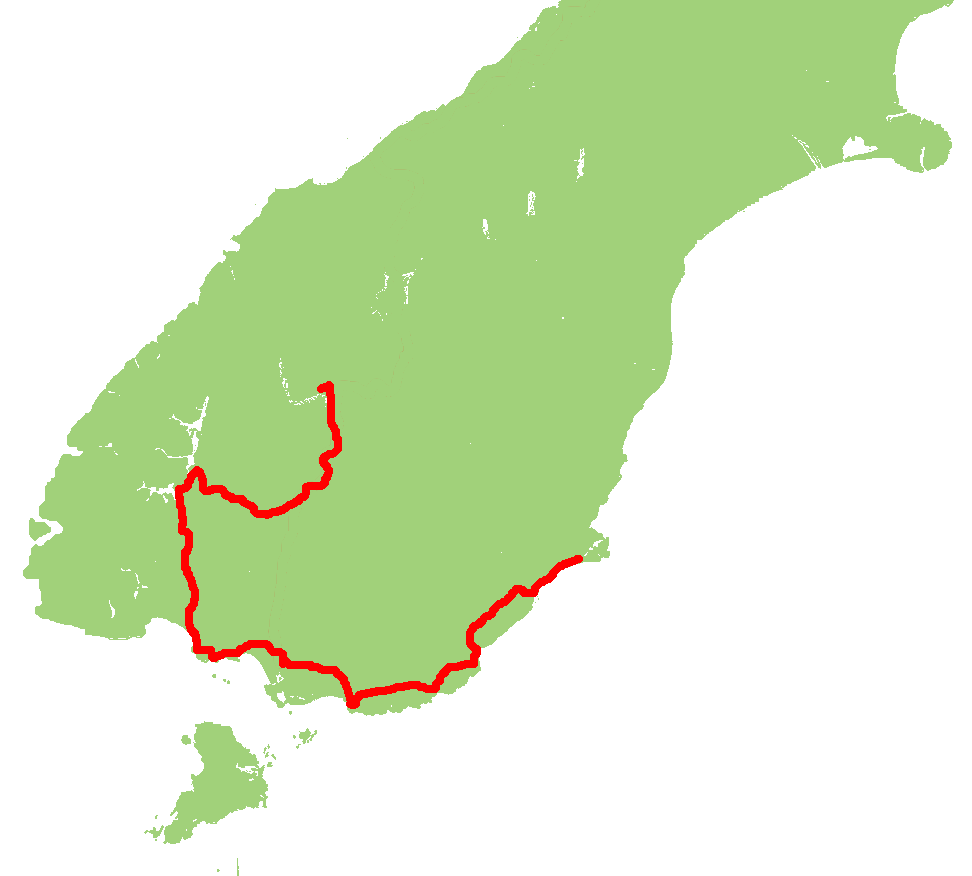

Route information
- Maintained by NZ Transport Agency, Venture Southland, Destination Queenstown, Destination Fiordland, Clutha District Council, Dunedin City Council and Department of Conservation
- Length: 610 km (380 mi)
- Existed: 6 November 1988–present

Major junctions
- West end: SH 6 at Queenstown
- SH 6 and SH 97 at Five Rivers SH 97 and SH 94 at Mossburn; SH 94 and SH 95 at Te Anau; SH 95 at Manapouri; SH 99 at Clifden; SH 6, SH 98 and SH 99 at Lorneville; SH 1 and SH 6 at Invercargill; SH 1 at Balclutha; SH 1 and SH 8 at Clarksville SH 1 at Waihola
- East end: SH 1 at Caversham, Dunedin

Location
- Country: New Zealand

Highway system
- New Zealand state highways; Motorways and expressways; List

Official logo

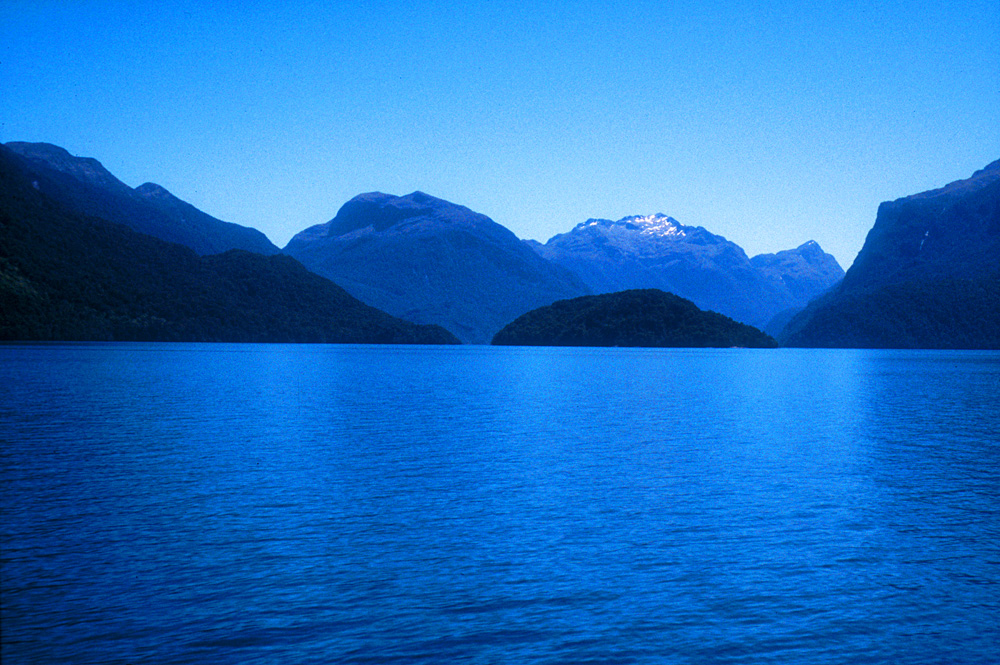
On Lake Te Anau

The Southern Scenic Route is a tourist highway in New Zealand linking Queenstown, Fiordland, Te Anau and the iconic Milford Road to Dunedin via Riverton, Invercargill and The Catlins. An Australian travel magazine labelled it "one of the world's great undiscovered drives" in 2008.

== History and development ==
The Southern Scenic Route concept and name were conceived at an informal gathering by Tuatapere residents John Fraser and Les Hutchins in November 1985 and confirmed at a public meeting in January 1986. The promoters then negotiated with road and tourism authorities and local government.

The project was a first for New Zealand and approval was a slow process. At one stage, traffic signs were installed in a clandestine operation. The Route opened officially on 6 November 1988, initially running between Te Anau in the west and Balclutha in the east. It was extended from Balclutha to Dunedin in 1998 and from Te Anau to Queenstown in 2010.

== Route ==
=== Current route ===
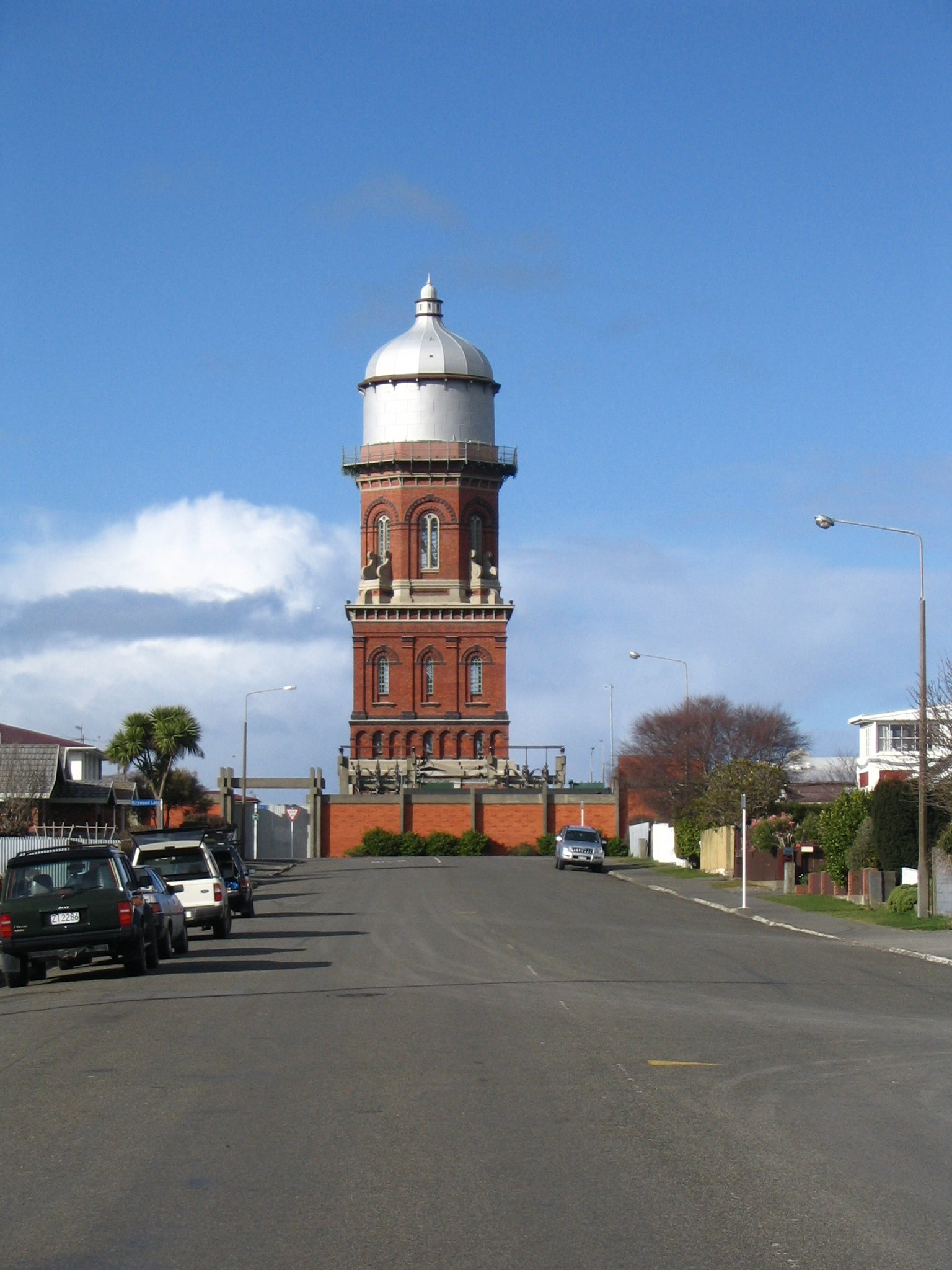
Invercargill Water Tower, viewed from Leet St

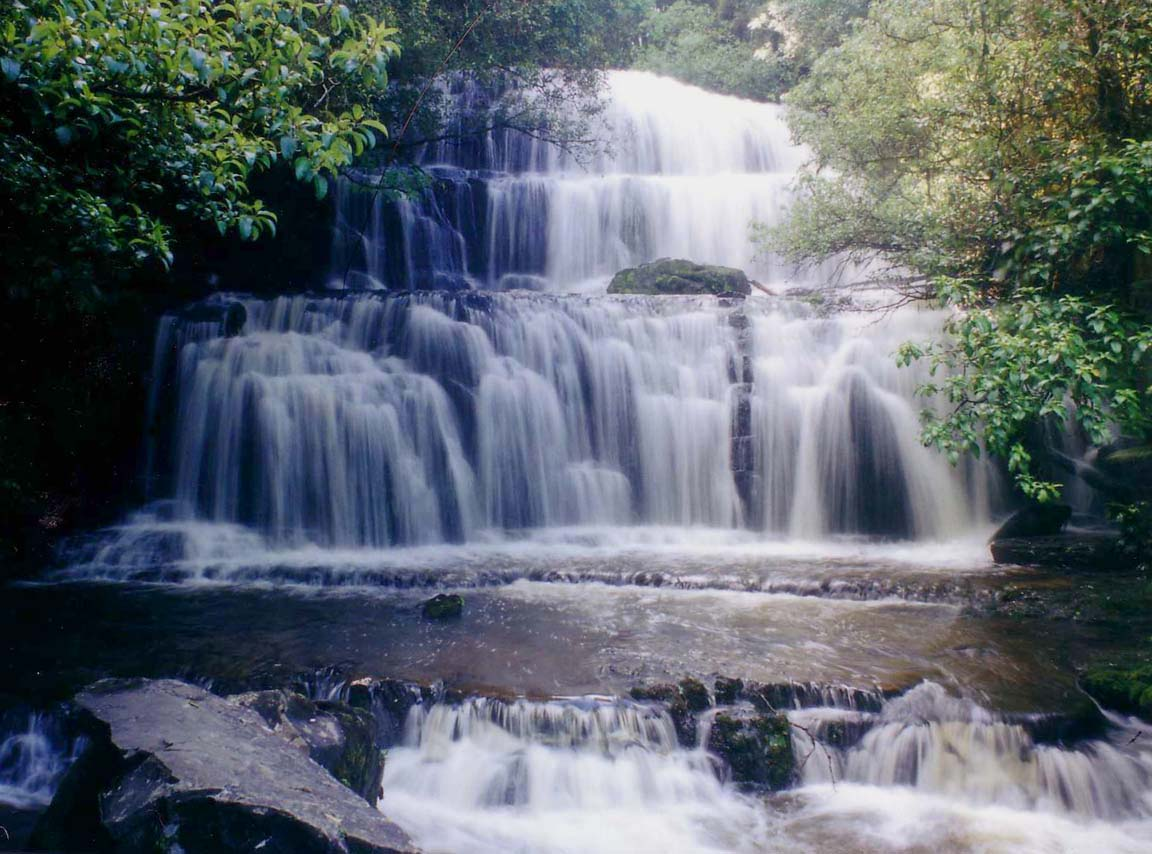
Purakaunui Falls, 17 km (11 mi) southwest of Owaka

The Route runs in a U shape from Queenstown to Dunedin. The first stretches of the route are along State Highway 6, along the southern coast of Lake Wakatipu. The route turns west before skirting the eastern boundary of Fiordland National Park, where it passes Manapouri and Tuatapere. At Te Waewae Bay the coast is reached and the route swings eastward towards Orepuki, Colac Bay, and Riverton. At Lorneville the New Zealand state highway network is rejoined, and the Southern Scenic Route runs on SH 6 for just eight kilometres south into Invercargill.

From Invercargill the route heads east through Fortrose and into the Catlins, then through Owaka to Balclutha. This part was formerly SH 92. The next section of rugged coastline with poor roading through Kaitangata is avoided, as the Southern Scenic Route follows SH 1 to Milton and Lake Waihola.

The Route leaves the highway at Waihola and climbs through Otago Coast Forest, reaching the coast at Taieri Mouth. From here it follows secondary roads through Brighton and Green Island, ending where it meets SH 1 again at Caversham.

=== Proposed extensions ===
In early 2007 a proposal arose to extend the route northward beyond Dunedin through Waitati. In November 2007, the Dunedin City Council confirmed that it planned to talk with the Waitaki District Council about extending the route to Oamaru, an idea that was not adopted.
