= Pahia =

Coordinates: 46°20′S 167°45′E

Pahia is a small rural locality in coastal Southland, New Zealand, not to be confused with the North Island tourist resort of Paihia. Surrounding areas include Ruahine, Wakapatu, Round Hill, Colac Bay and Orepuki. The main road, Orepuki-Riverton Hwy (section of State Highway 99), runs through it. Pahia is 15 minutes from Riverton, 20 minutes from Tuatapere and 45 minutes from Invercargill.

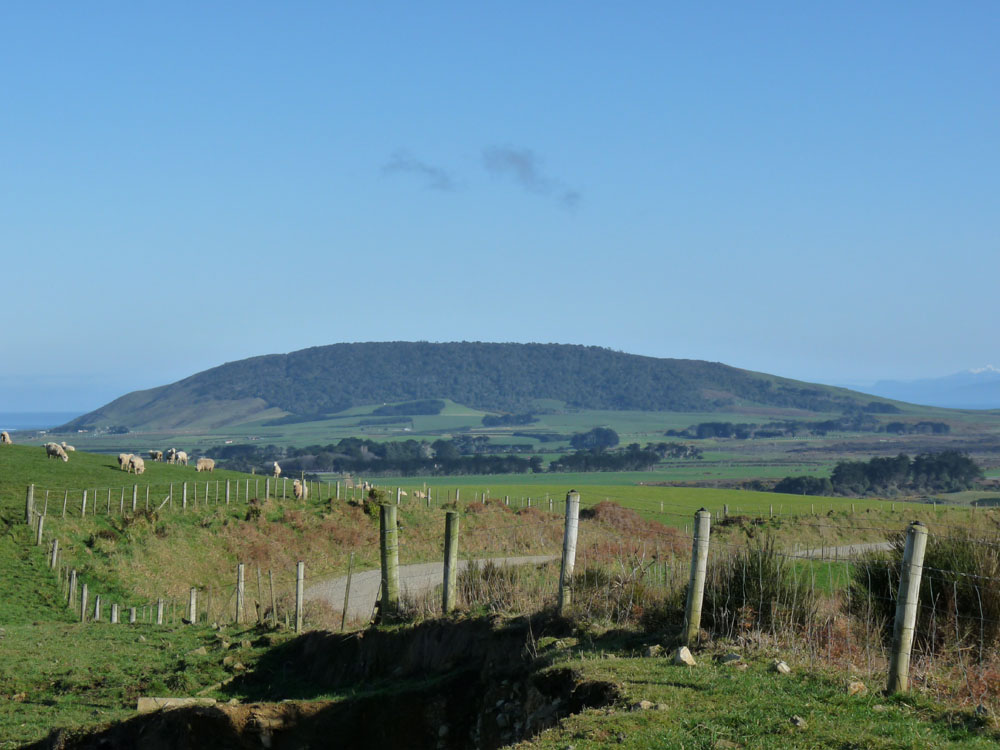
A uniquely shaped hill visible from Bluff Hill to Sandhill Point

== History ==
During the early years of European contact with New Zealand, Pahia was home to a substantial Māori village and island pā (fortified stronghold) near Cosy Nook (known locally as the "Old Pā"). The village served as an important contact point for European sealers and traders requiring potatoes and flax for the Australian market in the 1820s. The naming is uncertain. One theory is that the name 'Pahia' comes from the village Chief of the time, Tahu Pahia. The other theory is that it is a literal translation for 'slapped', referring to the hill resembling meals of mashed or pounded food.

It used to have rail running through, a cheese factory, forest industry and a small gold mining industry. It also once used to have a primary school named Pahia School, which closed its doors in 1997. Pahia is part of a historic trail with signage informing you of its history. The area today is made up of many farms, including sheep, dairy and deer.

Geographically Pahia lies between the thick, forest-covered Longwood Range and the Tasman Sea. There are outlooks in places over Te Waewae Bay and the Princess Mountains, and also Stewart Island / Rakiura. Pahia Hill, and across to Ruahine the Ruahine Hills and Mt Victoria make up some of the geographic landmarks. The weather on average is cooler than Central Otago but it is rare to have snow settle on the ground in Winter. Pahia is exposed to the weather coming from across the sea, but also sees its share of fine weather.

== Nearby attractions ==
- Cosy Nook, a very small fishing village
- Porridge, a world-famous surf spot
