= Alliance Group =

New Zealand freezing company

Alliance Group Limited, a cooperative originally named Alliance Freezing Company (Southland) Limited, operates freezing works at seven sites in New Zealand and exports grass-fed meat and by-products to Europe, North America, as well as Asia including China, India, Korea and Japan and many other countries. Alliance employs almost 5,000 people across New Zealand and operates two processing plants in the North Island and five in the South Island.

== Brands ==
- Pure South – the company's overarching brand for lamb, beef and venison
- Lumina Lamb – high country lamb
- Silere – alpine origin merino lamb
- Handpicked – beef and venison
- Ashley – for sheepmeat exported to Europe

== Corporate profile ==
The corporate identity was changed to Alliance in 2018.

David Surveyor has since January 2015 been the chief executive officer, succeeding Grant Cuff. Murray Taggart has been chairman of the board of directors since 1 October 2013.

== History ==
Alliance Freezing Company (Southland) Limited was founded by local farmers in Invercargill in 1948. Their first large freezing works was opened in 1960 at Lorneville on the outskirts of Invercargill.

From its base in Invercargill Alliance runs freezing works nearby in Southland at Lorneville and Mataura, further away at Pukeuri in Otago, Timaru in South Canterbury, and at Nelson. There are two freezing works in the North Island at Dannevirke and Levin. A new $15.9 million venison plant opened at Lorneville in December 2018.

Always a business belonging to farmers Alliance's ownership model was changed in 1960 to a cooperative. The farmers who supply the livestock to be killed are the company's shareholders. The name of the cooperative was changed to Alliance Group Limited in 1990.

Alliance Group bought their first North Island freezing works at Dannevirke in 2003. They added a second North Island works at Levin in 2008.

On 27 September 2024, the Alliance Group proposed closing down its Timaru Alliance Smithfield meatworks plant, which would affect about 600 jobs. The consultation period will last until 11 October, with a decision expected to be made on 18 October 2024. On 18 October, the Alliance Group confirmed that it would close down its Smithfield meat processing plant in December 2024, citing declining sheep processing numbers caused by land use changes.
