= State Highway 97 (New Zealand) =

Road in New Zealand

State Highway 97

Route information
- Maintained by NZ Transport Agency Waka Kotahi
- Length: 19.7 km (12.2 mi)
- Tourist routes: Southern Scenic Route

Major junctions
- East end: SH 6 (Athol Five Rivers Highway/Five Rivers Lumsden Highway) at Five Rivers
- West end: SH 94 (Devon Street) at Mossburn

Location
- Country: New Zealand

Highway system
- New Zealand state highways; Motorways and expressways; List
← SH 96	→ SH 98

State Highway 97 (SH 97) is a New Zealand State Highway connecting the settlements of Five Rivers (on SH 6) and Mossburn (on SH 94) in the Southland region. The highway was gazetted in 2004 to reflect the increasing amount of traffic between the tourist destinations of Queenstown and Fiordland National Park and provides a bypass of the town of Lumsden, where SH 6 and 94 intersect.

In 2010, the highway was added to the Southern Scenic Route when it was extended from Te Anau to Queenstown. The road proceeds generally in an east–west direction through dairying farmland and crosses the Ōreti River just north of Mossburn.

== See also ==
- List of New Zealand state highways
