= Pourakino River =

Coordinates: 46°20′S 167°59′E

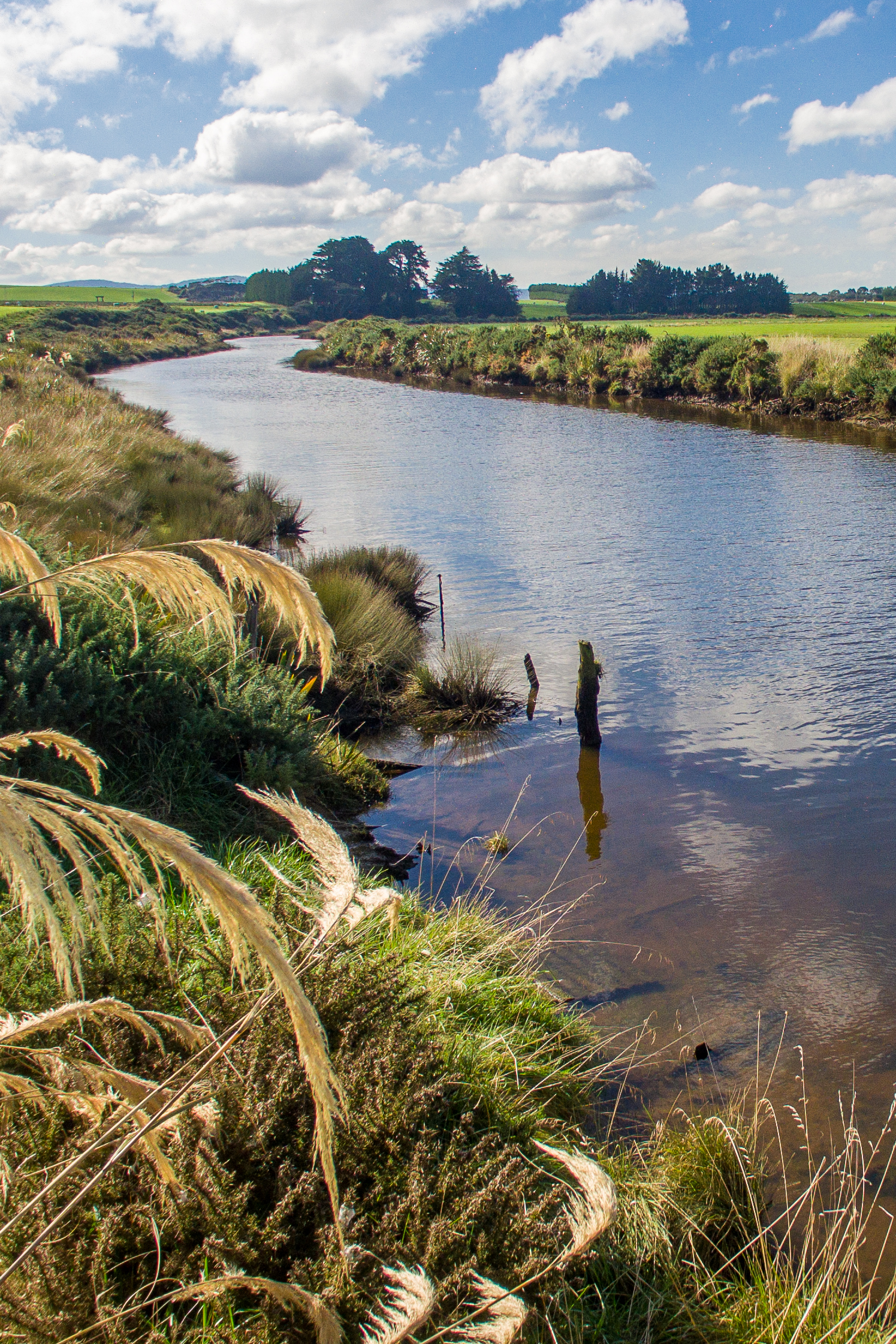

- Location within New Zealand

Location
- Country: New Zealand

The Pourakino River is a river in New Zealand, flowing into the Jacobs River Estuary at Riverton.

== See also ==
- List of rivers of New Zealand
