= Te Waewae Bay =

Bay on the Foveaux Strait of New Zealand

Coordinates: 46°15′S 167°30′E

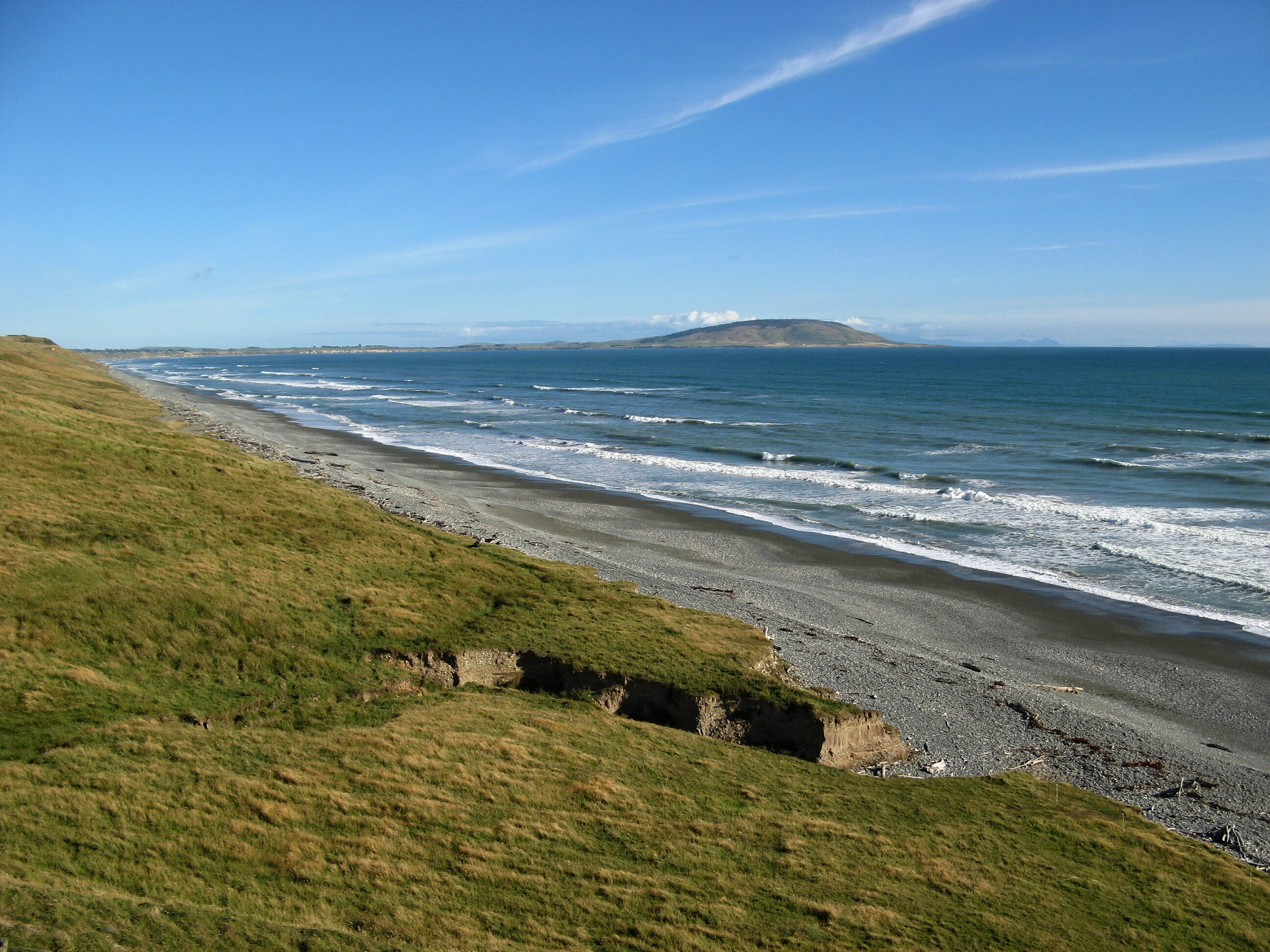
- Looking towards Pahia Hill

- Location in New Zealand
- Location: Foveaux Strait
- River sources: Waiau River, Waikoau River, Waimeamea River, Rowallan Burn
- Basin countries: New Zealand
- Max. length: 27 km (17 mi)

Te Waewae Bay is the westernmost of three large bays lying on the Foveaux Strait coast of Southland, New Zealand, the others being Oreti Beach and Toetoes Bay. Twenty-seven kilometres in length, the western end of the bay is mountainous, with the southern terminus of the Southern Alps and Fiordland National Park.

Its Māori name reflects the southern chief (rangatira), Te Waewae who resided in the bay for large periods of time.

The small farming town of Orepuki is situated on the cliffs at the eastern end of the bay and the timber town of Tuatapere and Port Craig is located seven kilometres north of the bay, on the banks of the Waiau River, which has its outflow in the bay.

The bay, lining from Sand Hill Point to Pahia Point, is declared as a marine mammal sanctuary and hosts an important habitat for New Zealand fur seals, the endemic Hector's dolphins and one of major winter breeding grounds for southern right whales on mainland coasts. Other species can be seen within the areas, from time to time, include such as humpback whales, orcas, Hooker's sea lions, and leopard seals. Sea Shepherd is conducting annual patrolling named the "Operation Pahu" (Pahu stands for Hector's Dolphins in Māori).

Surrounding lands, both coastal and terrestrial, are home to little blue penguins and Fiordland crested penguins, 25 species of native birds, and the endangered New Zealand long-tailed bats

== Gallery ==
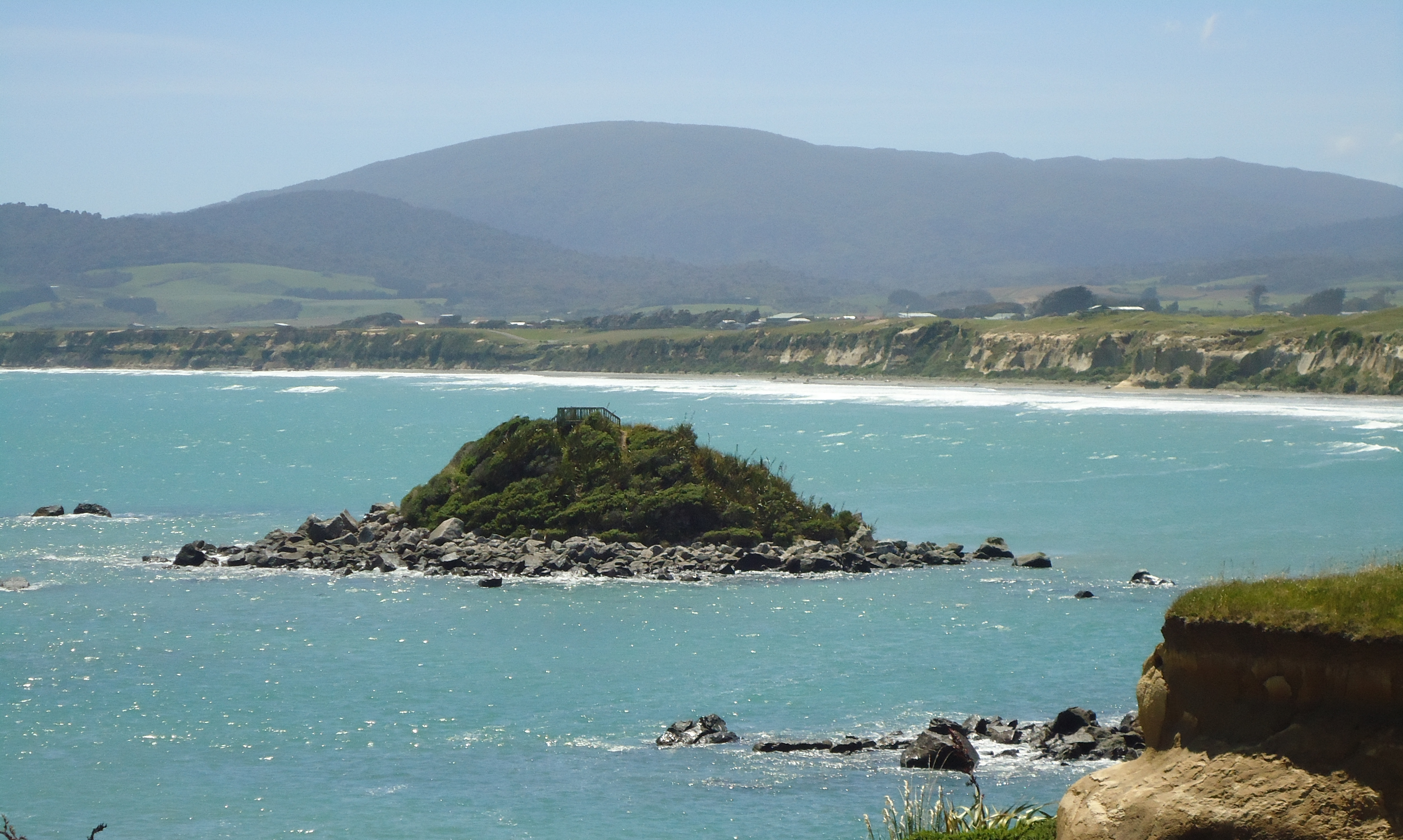
Monkey Island and Orepuki

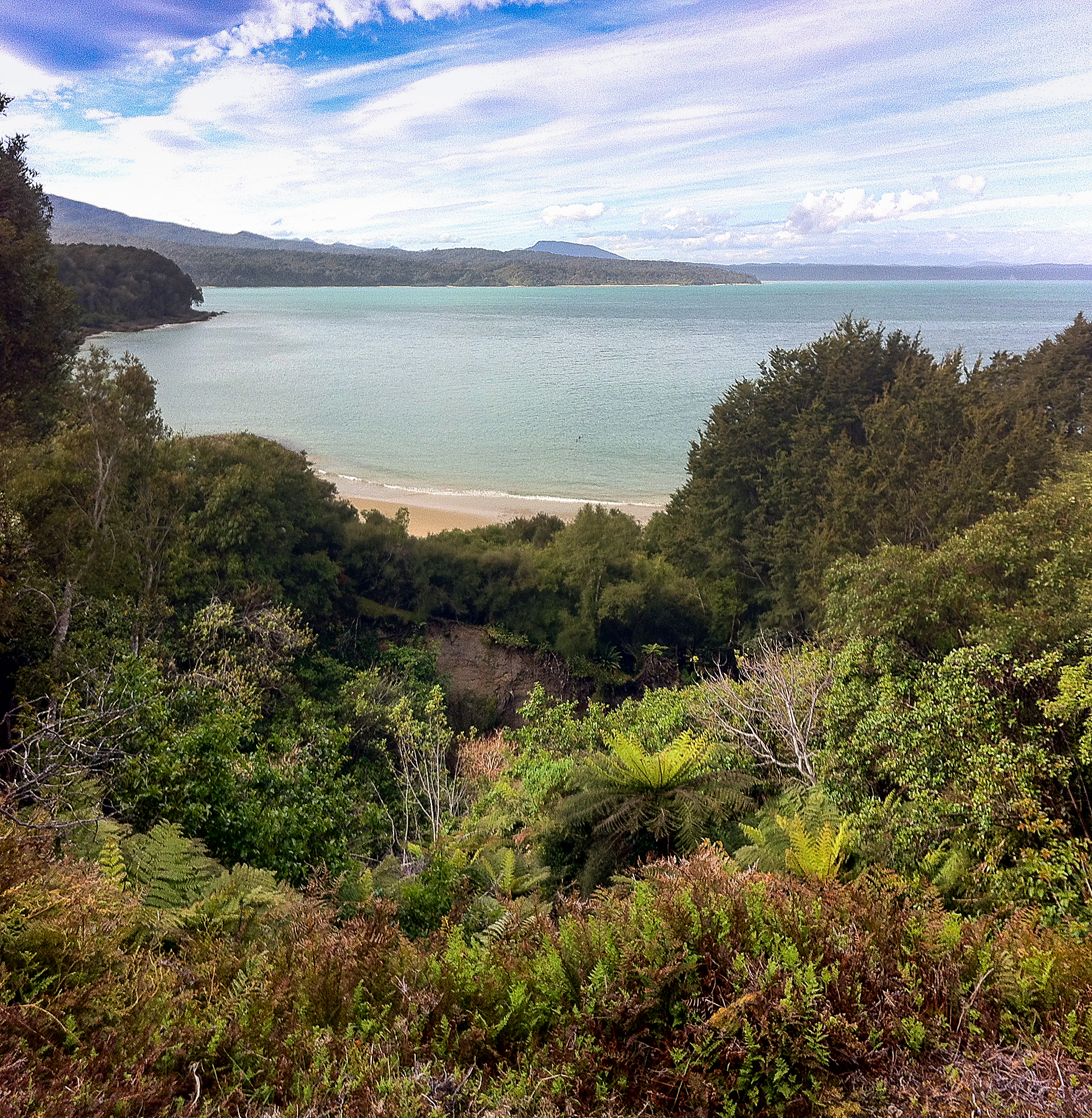
Mussel Beach, Port Craig
