= Colac Bay =

Township in New Zealand

Colac Bay Ōraka (Māori)
- Township
- Etymology: From Māori, Ō place of, and Raka, a local chief
- Interactive map of Colac Bay
- Location of Colac Bay in New Zealand
- Coordinates: 46.362°S 167.876°E
- Country: New Zealand
- Region: Southland Region
- District: Southland District
- Established: 1850s
- Time zone: UTC+12 (NZST)
  - Summer (DST): UTC+13 (NZDT)

Colac Bay, officially Colac Bay/ Ōraka, is a small township situated on the bay of the same name facing Foveaux Strait, and located on the Southern Scenic Route, 10 minutes from Riverton, New Zealand. Surrounding areas include Longwood, Tihaka, Waipango, Round Hill, Wakapatu, Ruahine, Pahia and Orepuki.

European settlers first arrived in the area in the 1850s to mill timber and mine for gold in the neighbouring Longwood Range. By 1881, the town had been connected to the growing rail network, and by 1900 it had reached a population of around 2000 people. The town has a well appointed cafe, craft shop, pub, caravan park, community hall and marae. The town also features a statue of a surfer riding a wave.

The hills behind Colac are part of the Longwood Range, which were a major gold mining area between the 1860s and 1950s. Further west shale was also mined for a short time. In the gold mining days there was a significant Chinese village towards Orepuki called Canton. Colac had a railway station from 25 July 1881 to 31 July 1976.

Colac Bay Hill, Lake George, Howell's Hills and the Longwood Range make up the geographic landmarks. In some places Raratoka Island or Centre Island and Stewart Island can be seen by looking across Foveaux Strait.

== Name ==
The area of the township was originally known to Māori as Māori: Ōraka (lit. 'place of Raka'), after a chief who lived in the area. The English name for the town, Colac Bay, is believed to be a corruption of Korako, a variation of the original Māori name. European whalers are said to have pronounced the original name in a similar way to the English word "colic", hence Kolluck's and "Colac's Bay". The Ngāi Tahu Claims Settlement Act 1998 resulted in Colac Bay being renamed to the dual name of Colac Bay / Ōraka.

== Surfing ==
Colac Bay is a popular destination for surfing, with cold but otherwise accessible conditions for all experience levels. An annual surfing competition, the Colac Bay Classic, is held in the area.

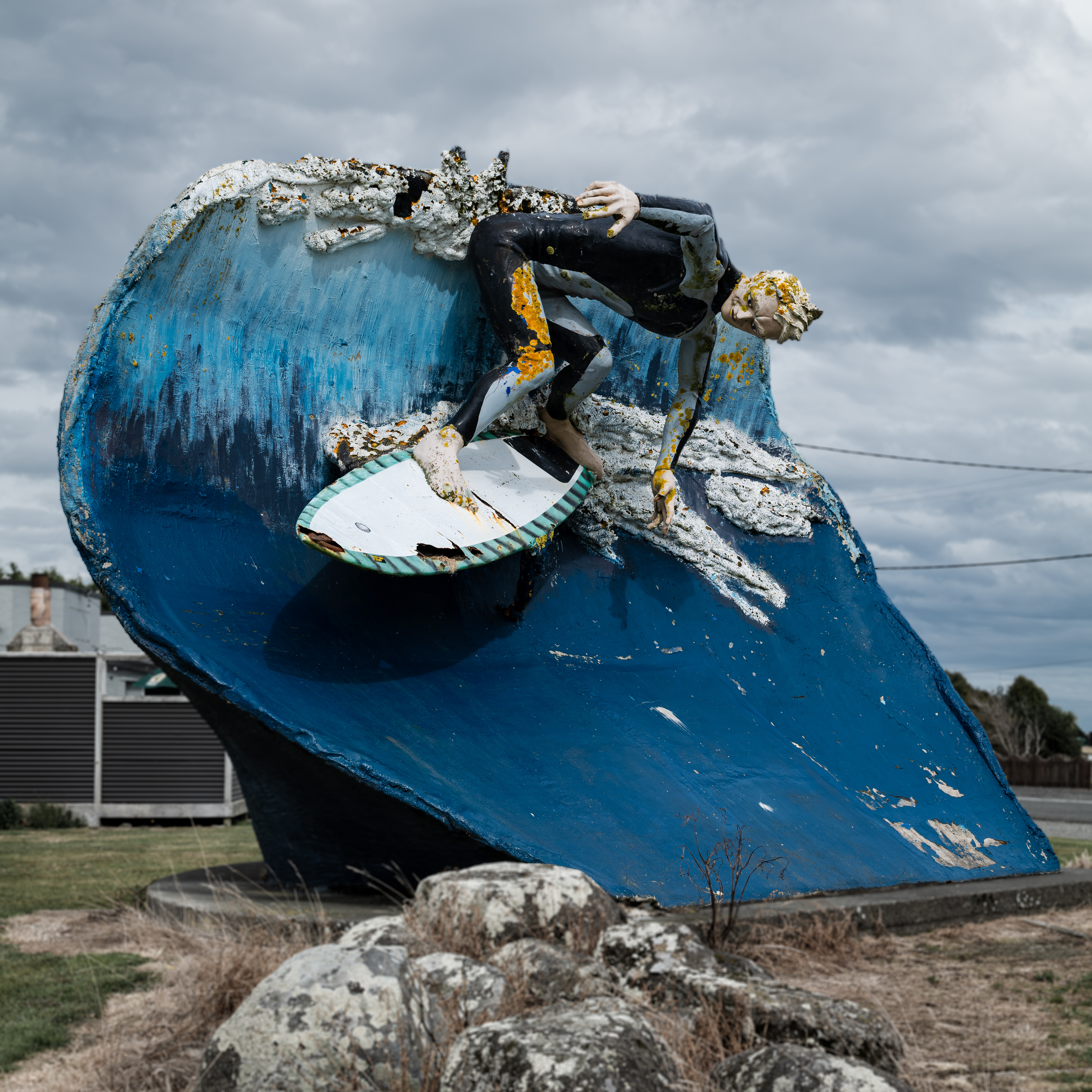
Giant Colac Bay Surfer

== Climate ==
Colac Bay's climate, which is similar to Invercargill's for its proximity, is oceanic (Cfb) in Köppen-Geiger climate classification system.

Its sea water becomes the warmest in February, at 12–15 °C (54–59 °F), while the coldest is in August, at 9–11 °C (48–52 °F).

Colac Bay mean sea temperature (since 1984)
Jan	Feb	Mar	Apr	May	Jun	Jul	Aug	Sep	Oct	Nov	Dec
13 °C (55 °F)	13 °C (55 °F)	13 °C (55 °F)	12 °C (54 °F)	11 °C (52 °F)	10 °C (50 °F)	10 °C (50 °F)	10 °C (50 °F)	10 °C (50 °F)	10 °C (50 °F)	11 °C (52 °F)	12 °C (54 °F)
