= Tuatapere Branch =

Branch line railway in Southland, New Zealand

Map

The Tuatapere Branch, including the Orawia Branch, was a branch line railway in Southland, New Zealand. Although the Tuatapere and Orawia Branches look like a single line, operationally they were considered separate lines. The first section opened to Riverton in 1879 and reached Tuatapere three decades later. The extension from Tuatapere to Orawia operated from 1925 until 1970. In 1976 the Tuatapere Branch was truncated to Riverton, and was known as the Riverton Branch until 1978, when it closed beyond Thornbury. The remaining portion of the line is now part of the Wairio Branch.

== Construction ==
The desire to open up regions west of Invercargill prompted construction of this line, with developers hoping to discover plentiful minerals and resources, and encourage more substantial settlement in the area. The first section of the line was built from Makarewa on the Kingston Branch to Riverton via Thornbury, the Wairio Branch junction, and opened on 9 June 1879. The line was opened in stages: Colac on 25 July 1881, Roundhill on 24 September 1883, Orepuki on 5 May 1885, Waihoaka on 1 October 1903 and Tuatapere on 1 October 1909.

There was some dispute over where to commence a railway to the settlement of Orawia. One of the two main proposals was to extend the Tuatapere line, and the other was to build a branch from Waikouro on the Wairio Branch. Ultimately, the Tuatapere proposal was accepted, and although construction was postponed due to World War I, work had recommenced by October 1919 and the Public Works Department was operating trains by mid-September 1924. The line was handed over to the New Zealand Railways Department (NZR) and officially opened on 20 October 1925.

== Operation ==
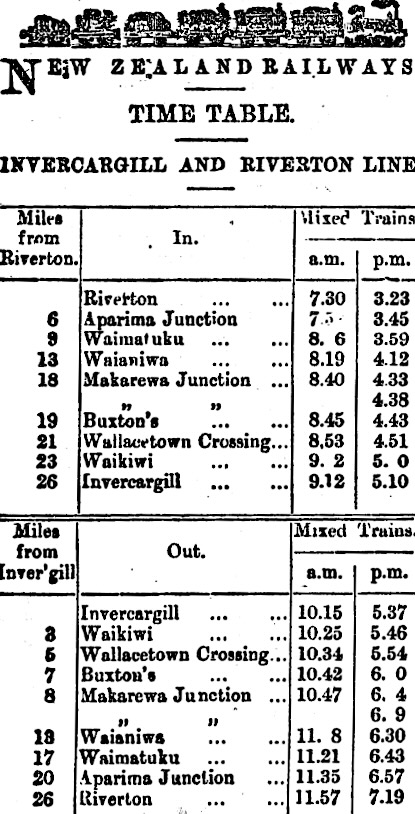
1879 Riverton timetable

The line was run as two separate branches from Tuatapere: the Tuatapere Branch from Invercargill, and the Orawia Branch. During the days of steam motive power, most services on the branches were operated from a depot at Tuatapere. Trains were typically mixed, carrying both passengers and freight. One such train daily operated from Tuatapere to Invercargill and return, while another ran Invercargill to Tuatapere and return. Orawia was served by a service from Tuatapere on Mondays, Wednesdays and Fridays. Along the line, a lucrative logging industry was established and many bush tramways were built to provide easy cartage of logs to the railway line. A timber mill was established in Tuatapere to process the logs and it provided much traffic for the railway. In the early days of the line, oil shale was a prominent source of freight from Orepuki. The railway was also indispensable in helping to develop the Waiau River valley and its settlements.

A locomotive from the More & Sons sawmill tramway, which ran about 12 miles (19 km) from Longwood, is on display beside Riverton museum. The tramway was open from 1902 to 1960.

Passenger services on the Orawia Branch did not last even a decade. By 1932, passengers were no longer carried and goods trains ran only twice weekly. Passengers could travel on the rest of the line until the early 1950s, and around this time the daily Invercargill to Tuatapere and return goods train was withdrawn. This was partially offset by a Monday to Friday goods train from the Wairio Branch junction at Thornbury to Tuatapere. The Orawia Branch looked as if it could be closed at any time until a cement works was constructed in the town in 1956. It provided sufficient traffic to justify the Orawia Branch's existence.

Traffic declined during the 1960s, and when steam motive power was replaced by D^{J} class diesel-electrics in June 1968, Tuatapere locomotive depot closed and services changed to operate out of Invercargill thrice weekly, on Monday, Wednesday and Friday. In May 1968 the cement works in Orawia closed, and deprived of its main source of traffic, the Orawia Branch closed on 1 October 1970. By the mid-1970s, only 4,500 tonnes of traffic yearly were railed west of Riverton and the line was cut back to Riverton on 30 July 1976. There were expectations that forestry developments would create sufficient traffic from Riverton, but these failed to eventuate and the line from Thornbury was closed on 15 January 1978. A minor protest to keep the Thornbury to Riverton section open for tourism and potential private railway operations, was to no avail. The section from Makarewa and Thornbury became part of the Wairio Branch.

== Stations ==
Thornbury to Riverton (9 June 1879 to 15 January 1978) closed to passengers 28 June 1954

Station	Distance	notes
Thornbury	0 km	Thornbury refreshment rooms, station and goods shed about 1910 Thornbury in 1938, with the pre- (bottom left) and post- (mid right) 1930 stations Thornbury had a station at the junction of the lines to Invercargill, Nightcaps and Riverton. Named Aparima Junction in 1879, then Thornbury Junction, it became Thornbury from 1 July 1881. From 1879 to 1930 it had a 5th class station, with a platform, cart approach, 61 ft (19 m) x 31 ft (9.4 m) goods shed, loading bank, cattle yards, water service, fixed signals, urinals and a passing loop for 27 wagons (extended to 41 by 1886), with an engine reversing triangle added by 1898. The station had a Post Office from 1880 until the station moved in 1930. Refreshment rooms were built in 1880. In 1882 reference was made to the "dangerous practice of passengers crossing line" to reach the rooms. The concrete rooms were gutted by fire in 1913. An advert invited tenders for replacement rooms. Several railway houses were built between 1882 and 1956. An automatic tablet exchanger was added in 1909. On 28 November 1929 Cabinet approved a new station and yard, estimated to cost £10,000, to allow coal from Ohai to run to Invercargill without reversal. Despite protests, in 1930 the station was moved from the centre to the edge of the village and rebuilt as an island platform. Staff were reduced from a stationmaster, clerk, cadet and platelayer in 1930, to just a clerk in 1933. Electricity was used in the rebuilt station and yard. The old station building was sold in 1937. The burnt out refreshment rooms remain in their ruined state, but the 1930 station was removed between 1991 and 2010, except for a loading bank. The new station had a turntable until it was removed in 1969.
Otaitai Bush	4.6 km (2.9 mi)	Otaitai Bush had a shelter shed, platform and cart approach. The station closed on 22 September 1957.
Riverton Racecourse		A new stopping place opposite the Racecourse was noted on 27 May 1933 and in November 1933 a shelter shed was moved from Menzies Ferry for £11.14s. By 17 April 1957 trains no longer stopped at the station and the shed and tablet hut were removed. The station closed on 17 April 1957.
Riverton	9.6 km (6.0 mi)	Riverton railway bridge as rebuilt in 1904. The station is on the left in the background Work at Riverton began with the first sod being turned on 26 June 1874, followed by construction of a house in 1875, but progress was slow, largely due to a dispute with the original contractor, David Proudfoot. A public meeting in 1878 called on the Minister for Public Works to hurry work on. Riverton's Mayor, Theophilus Daniel, formally opened the railway on 9 June 1879, saying he hoped it would eventually run the length of the island, linking Te Koko-o-Kupe / Cloudy Bay with Rakituma / Preservation Inlet. David Proudfoot won the Riverton-Orepuki contract, with a tender of £28,397. Riverton remained the terminus of the railway for two years. A 5th class station was considered, but a 4th class station, platform, cart approach, 75 ft (23 m) x 31 ft (9.4 m) goods shed (demolished in 1973), loading bank, water service, coal accommodation, turntable, engine shed, fixed signals, urinals and a loop for 24 wagons (by 1886 29 wagons) were built. As early as 1884 it was noted that Riverton Bridge could take locomotives no heavier than class F. and an 1886 report on the condition of the bridge urged erection of new one. By 1902 the shared wooden road rail bridge was busier. Construction of a new bridge began in October 1902. The 750 m (2,460 ft) long bridge and causeway opened in 1904. After closure in 1978 the bridge was no longer maintained and in 1994 Southland District Council asked for it to be upgraded or removed. It was demolished in 2001. Nothing remains of the station.

Riverton to Colac Bay / Ōraka (25 July 1881 to 31 July 1976) closed to passengers 28 June 1954

Longwood	14.67 km (9.12 mi)	Longwood had a shelter shed, platform and, by 1888, also a cart approach. It closed on 5 November 1972. An extensive 19 km (12 mi) More & Sons bush tramway from 1902 to 1 September 1960 had a siding near the station.
Tihaka	17.7 km (11.0 mi)	McKillop & Trail had a private siding from 20 December 1883, which was transferred to Frew & Co on 18 April 1883. It was renamed as Oraki on 13 April 1885. It had a shelter shed, platform and loop for 24 wagons. On 15 September 1912 the name was again changed to be Tihaka. It closed on 6 November 1955, but from 1966 to 17 March 1967 Tihaka Sand Pit siding supplied NZR with sand for locomotives, and track repair.
Colac	21.04 km (13.07 mi)	Colac had a ballast pit, a shelter shed, platform, loop for 11 wagons (extended to 21 by 1886). By 1886 it also had a cart approach, 31 ft (9.4 m) x 21 ft (6.4 m) goods shed, loading bank, water service and urinals. Additions to shelter shed were made in 1899.

Colac to Orepuki (5 May 1885 to 31 July 1976) closed to passengers 28 June 1954

Wakapatu	26.15 km (16.25 mi)	Whakapatu flag station had a shelter shed, platform and, by 1886, also a cart approach and loop for 30 wagons On 14–15 January 1917 bush fires damaged the station. The station building was sold in 1970.
Ruahine	29.83 km (18.54 mi)	Ruahine had a shelter shed, platform, loading bank, siding and, by 1886, also a cart approach and loop for 32 wagons. The station closed on 4 September 1966.
Pahia	32.34 km (20.10 mi)	Pahia had a shelter shed, platform, loading bank, siding, then cattle yards in 1885 and, by 1886, also a cart approach and a loop for 29 wagons.
Hirsts	35.45 km (22.03 mi)	On 3 August 1885 £20 was authorised to build a platform for Mr Hirst. By 1886 there was a platform, cart approach and, from 9 December 1901, a flag station with a shelter shed for passenger and parcels traffic. The station closed on 22 September 1957.
Orepuki	37.95 km (23.58 mi)	Orepuki in 1900s Orepuki station was opened by Theophilus Daniel on 5 May 1885. It had a 4th class wood and iron station building (including a ladies waiting room and ticket lobby), Post Office (until 23 June 1960), cart approach, 42 ft (13 m) x 32 ft (9.8 m) goods shed, crane, loading bank, engine shed, water service, coal accommodation, stationmaster's house, several railway cottages, by 1886 also urinals and a loop for 44 wagons. About 1897 a turntable was added, in 1893 stockyards were provided and in 1937 a coal shed. Orepuki remained a terminus until 1903. In 1941 part of the station was badly damaged by fire and Closed as an officered station on 31 March 1942. In 1961 the station building was sold. The buildings have gone, except for the water tank.

Orepuki to Waihoaka (1 October 1903 to 26 April 1970) closed to passengers 28 June 1954

Te Tumutu	43.15 km (26.81 mi)	Flag station with a shelter shed, platform, loading bank and loop for 17 wagons. The station closed on 1 April 1956.
Waihoaka	45.29 km (28.14 mi)	Waihoaka remained the terminus of the line for 6 years. The flag station had a 7th class building, built by Edward Walter Bone, 300 ft (91 m) x 20 ft (6.1 m) platform, cart approach, privies, urinals, loading bank, 40 ft (12 m) x 30 ft (9.1 m) goods shed, cattle yards, 2 platelayers' cottages and a loop for 46 wagons, lifted by the end of 1941. The goods shed was sold in 1970.

Waihoaka to Tuatapere (1 October 1909 to 31 July 1976) closed to passengers 28 June 1954

Tewaewae	50.67 km (31.48 mi)	In 1906 it was planned to call the flag station Te Tua, but from 18 January 1908 it was known as Te Waewae and a gravel pit was opened. The station had a shelter shed (with ladies waiting room), platform with cart access, 30 ft (9.1 m) x 20 ft (6.1 m) goods shed, loading bank, water, urinals and a loop for 37 wagons. In 1910 improvements were made to the cattle yards.
Te Tua	54.44 km (33.83 mi)	Harry Morris, Invercargill, signed a £889 contract on 22 August 1907 to erect station buildings, with latrines at the south end of the platform. The work was done by 30 January 1908 and from 8 December 1908 cheese was hauled to Waihoaka with the ballast engine and ten days later, also wool. In July 1909 E W Boie completed a further contract for station buildings and H Morris another by October 1909. The flag station opened with a shelter shed, platform, 30 ft (9.1 m) x 20 ft (6.1 m) goods shed, loading bank, cattle yards, urinals and a loop for 34 wagons. The loop was lifted in 1941.
Tuatapere	58.2 km (36.2 mi)	1915 station in 2004 Tuatapere was the terminus for 16 years and facilities for engines were never provided on the remaining 13 km of the branch. The station opened by the Minister of Internal Affairs, David Buddo, with a large crowd on 23 September 1909, though some buildings were not finished. S Shields & Andrews, Invercargill, signed a £4462.11.7 contract for station buildings on 22 April 1909. There was a 4th class station, platform, cart approach, 40 ft (12 m) x 30 ft (9.1 m) goods shed, loading bank, cattle yards, 6,000 gallon water vat, 50 ton coal shed, coaling crane with 8 x 10 cwt tubs, 50 ft (15 m) turntable, 60 ft (18 m) single-road engine shed with pit, stationmaster's house, urinals and a loop for 48 wagons. They were completed by 28 March 1910. On 9 January 1915 the station and Post Office burnt down and station work was done at the goods shed. A replacement station was built with a verandah. From 1930 the station had electricity and fluorescent lights from 1969. In 1908 2 cottages were built for engineers and in 1925 2 houses for the Maintenance Branch. There was a Post Office at the station from 20 December 1909 until the 1915 fire. After closure the station was again used from 11 April 1983 and from 1986 to 1988 it was used by the Waiau Community Theatre. The buildings remain.

Tuatapere to Orawia (20 October 1925 to 1 October 1970) closed to passengers 16 November 1930

Piko Piko	62.56 km (38.87 mi)	Piko Piko had a shelter shed, platform, cart approach, loading bank and a passing loop for 33 wagons. The station closed on 6 November 1955. Sutherland and Harris had a short tramway linking to the Waiau River from about 1924.
Pukemaori	68.62 km (42.64 mi)	The line was ready for use by 10 April 1924 and opened for goods on 9 September 1924. The flag station had a shelter shed, platform, cart approach, loading bank, cattle and sheep yards, with 2 holding yards and a passing loop for 28 wagons. The station closed on 22 September 1957.
Orawia	71.86 km (44.65 mi)	Orawia railway station and cement works in 1947 PWD started work in 1922 and the stockyards were open and goods could be carried by 24 March 1925. The flag station had a station building with ladies waiting room, conveniences, platform, cart dock and approaches, 37 ft (11 m) x 22 ft (6.7 m) goods shed (with a verandah), loading bank, cattle and sheep yards, with 5 holding yards, a 55 ft (17 m) cast iron turntable (replaced by one from Kingston in 1927, the original being sent to Addington), privies and urinals. However, there was no water for engines. 2 railway houses were built. The Tuatapere – Orawia Section was one of 10 lines listed for closure when the Government cut back on railway expenditure in 1930. It was scheduled to close on 23 August 1930, but was reprieved for a year in October 1930 and goods traffic continued.

== Today ==
Some notable relics remained after closure. The most significant of these was the causeway and truss bridge that crossed the mouth of the Jacob River estuary in Riverton. The bridge and formation was removed in 2003, with one truss preserved by a local museum. The wooden viaduct near Tuatapere still exists. Tuatapere station and yard area are used by the local Jewish community, with the goods shed, station building, and water tank all standing in relatively good condition, though the station building's exterior requires repairs and there are proposals to relocate it to a site on the Otago Central Rail Trail. The Orawia Branch's formation is distinct for much of its length, and at the terminus is the goods shed, with the ruins of the old cement works nearby. The formation of the Tuatapere Branch is also pretty clear in most places, and in Wakatapu some discarded rails and sleepers are at the old yard site, while a loading bank is at Ruahine and relocated station buildings still stand at Longwood and Orepuki.

== See also ==
- Main South Line
- Kingston Branch
- Bluff Branch
- Browns/Hedgehope Branch
- Seaward Bush/Tokanui Branch
- Wairio/Ohai Branch
