= Oreti Beach =

Beach in New Zealand

Coordinates: 46.4019°S 168.132°E

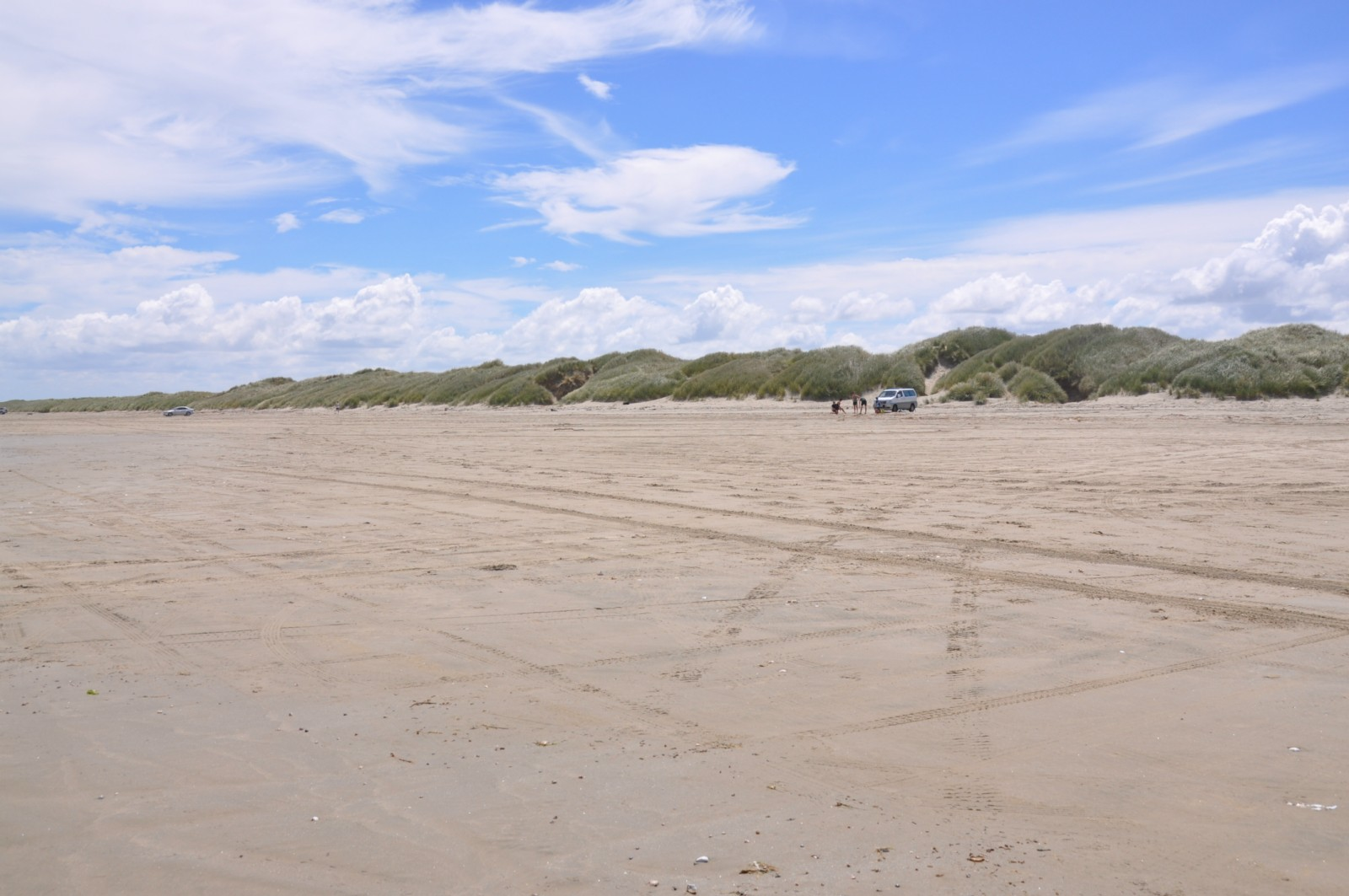
Oreti Beach

Oreti Beach is the central bay of three lying on the Foveaux Strait coast of Southland, New Zealand, the others being Te Waewae Bay and Toetoes Bay. Twenty-six kilometres in length, the bay lies between the town of Riverton and the outflow of the Aparima River in the northwest, and the estuary of the Ōreti River in the southeast.

The city of Invercargill is located on the Waihopai River ten kilometres east of the bay at the closest point.

This is the site where Burt Munro practised riding the Indian motorbike with which he would go on to break records at Bonneville Salt flats, Utah.

In 1967 an emperor penguin was found at the beach and was the only emperor penguin to have been found in New Zealand until Happy Feet arrived at Peka Peka Beach in 2011.
