= Wallacetown =

- Rural settlement
- Interactive map of Wallacetown
- Coordinates: 46.335°S 168.288°E
- Country: New Zealand
- Region: Southland region
- Territorial authorities of New Zealand: Southland District
- Ward: Oreti Ward
- Community: Oreti Community
- Electorates: Invercargill; Te Tai Tonga (Māori)

Government
  - Territorial authority: Southland District Council
  - Regional council: Southland Regional Council
  - Mayor of Southland: Rob Scott
  - Invercargill MP: Penny Simmonds
  - Te Tai Tonga MP: Tākuta Ferris

Area
  - Total: 0.87 km^{2} (0.34 sq mi)

Population (June 2025)
  - Total: 750
  - Density: 860/km^{2} (2,200/sq mi)
- Time zone: UTC+12 (New Zealand Standard Time)
  - Summer (DST): UTC+13 (New Zealand Daylight Time)
- Postcode: 9816
- Local iwi: Ngāi Tahu

Wallacetown is a small town in Southland, in the South Island of New Zealand. Wallacetown is to the west of Invercargill, on high ground between the Makarewa and Ōreti rivers, near the Ōreti's estuary. Both rivers are popular for trout and whitebait fishing. It is considered to be a satellite town of Invercargill. It is served by State Highway 99, which skirts the town's northern edge.

== Demographics ==
Wallacetown is described as a rural settlement by Statistics New Zealand. It covers 0.87 km^{2} (0.34 sq mi), and had an estimated population of 750 as of June 2025, with a population density of 862 people per km^{2}. It is part of the much larger Wallacetown statistical area.

Historical population for the settlement
Year	Pop.	±% p.a.
2006	612	—
2013	681	+1.54%
2018	717	+1.04%

Wallacetown had a population of 717 at the 2018 New Zealand census, an increase of 36 people (5.3%) since the 2013 census, and an increase of 105 people (17.2%) since the 2006 census. There were 270 households, comprising 369 males and 342 females, giving a sex ratio of 1.08 males per female, with 168 people (23.4%) aged under 15 years, 111 (15.5%) aged 15 to 29, 339 (47.3%) aged 30 to 64, and 93 (13.0%) aged 65 or older.

Ethnicities were 91.2% European/Pākehā, 10.9% Māori, 0.8% Pasifika, 2.9% Asian, and 2.9% other ethnicities. People may identify with more than one ethnicity.

Although some people chose not to answer the census's question about religious affiliation, 57.7% had no religion, 34.3% were Christian and 1.7% had other religions.

Of those at least 15 years old, 48 (8.7%) people had a bachelor's or higher degree, and 141 (25.7%) people had no formal qualifications. 84 people (15.3%) earned over $70,000 compared to 17.2% nationally. The employment status of those at least 15 was that 330 (60.1%) people were employed full-time, 60 (10.9%) were part-time, and 24 (4.4%) were unemployed.

=== Wallacetown statistical area ===
Wallacetown statistical area covers 89.79 km^{2} (34.67 sq mi) and had an estimated population of 1,240 as of June 2025, with a population density of 14 people per km^{2}.

Historical population for the statistical area
Year	Pop.	±% p.a.
2006	1,056	—
2013	1,158	+1.33%
2018	1,173	+0.26%

The statistical area had a population of 1,173 at the 2018 New Zealand census, an increase of 15 people (1.3%) since the 2013 census, and an increase of 117 people (11.1%) since the 2006 census. There were 441 households, comprising 609 males and 567 females, giving a sex ratio of 1.07 males per female. The median age was 39.3 years (compared with 37.4 years nationally), with 243 people (20.7%) aged under 15 years, 204 (17.4%) aged 15 to 29, 591 (50.4%) aged 30 to 64, and 138 (11.8%) aged 65 or older.

Ethnicities were 90.3% European/Pākehā, 11.3% Māori, 1.8% Pasifika, 3.8% Asian, and 2.8% other ethnicities. People may identify with more than one ethnicity.

The percentage of people born overseas was 8.4, compared with 27.1% nationally.

Although some people chose not to answer the census's question about religious affiliation, 53.2% had no religion, 37.6% were Christian, 0.3% had Māori religious beliefs, 0.5% were Muslim and 1.3% had other religions.

Of those at least 15 years old, 96 (10.3%) people had a bachelor's or higher degree, and 231 (24.8%) people had no formal qualifications. The median income was $38,800, compared with $31,800 nationally. 153 people (16.5%) earned over $70,000 compared to 17.2% nationally. The employment status of those at least 15 was that 576 (61.9%) people were employed full-time, 108 (11.6%) were part-time, and 33 (3.5%) were unemployed.

== Education ==
Wallacetown School is a contributing primary school for years 1 to 6 with a roll of 75 as of July 2026. The school opened in 1865 and celebrated its centennial in 1965.
