= Orepuki =

Locality in Southland District, Southland Region, New Zealand

Orepuki Aropaki (Māori)
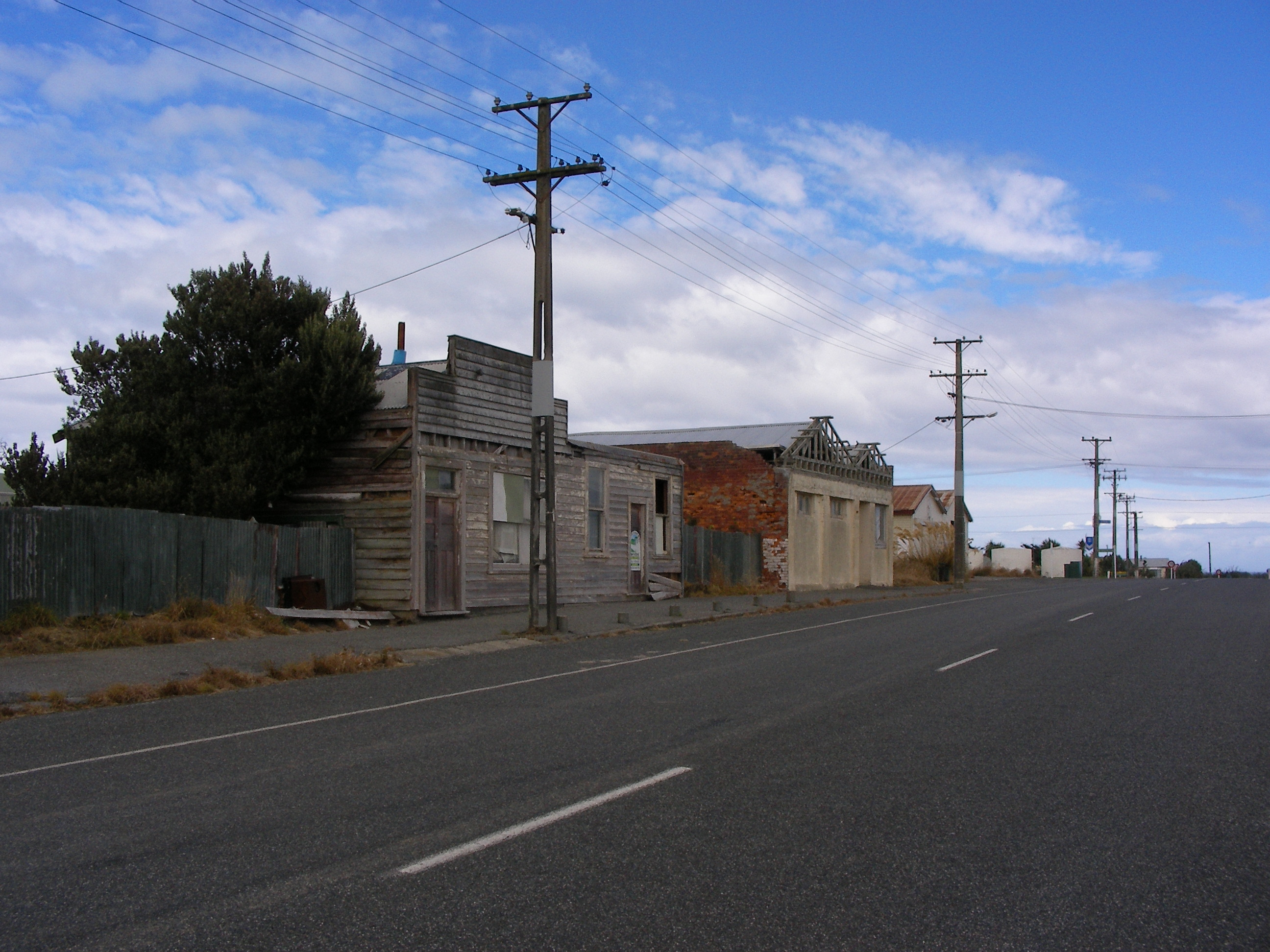
- Abandoned stores in Orepuki
- Etymology: Unclear etymology, with multiple potential translations proposed.
- Location of Orepuki in New Zealand
- Country: New Zealand
- Region: Southland
- District: Southland
- Established: 1865

Orepuki in Southland, New Zealand is a small country township on the coast of Te Waewae Bay some 20 minutes from Riverton / Aparima, 15 minutes from Tuatapere and 50 minutes from Invercargill that sits at the foot of the Longwood Range. Once a thriving gold mining settlement of 3000 people, today Orepuki is something of a ghost town with an assortment of abandoned stores, goldmining relics and sluicing scars as the only reminders of its former glory.

== History ==
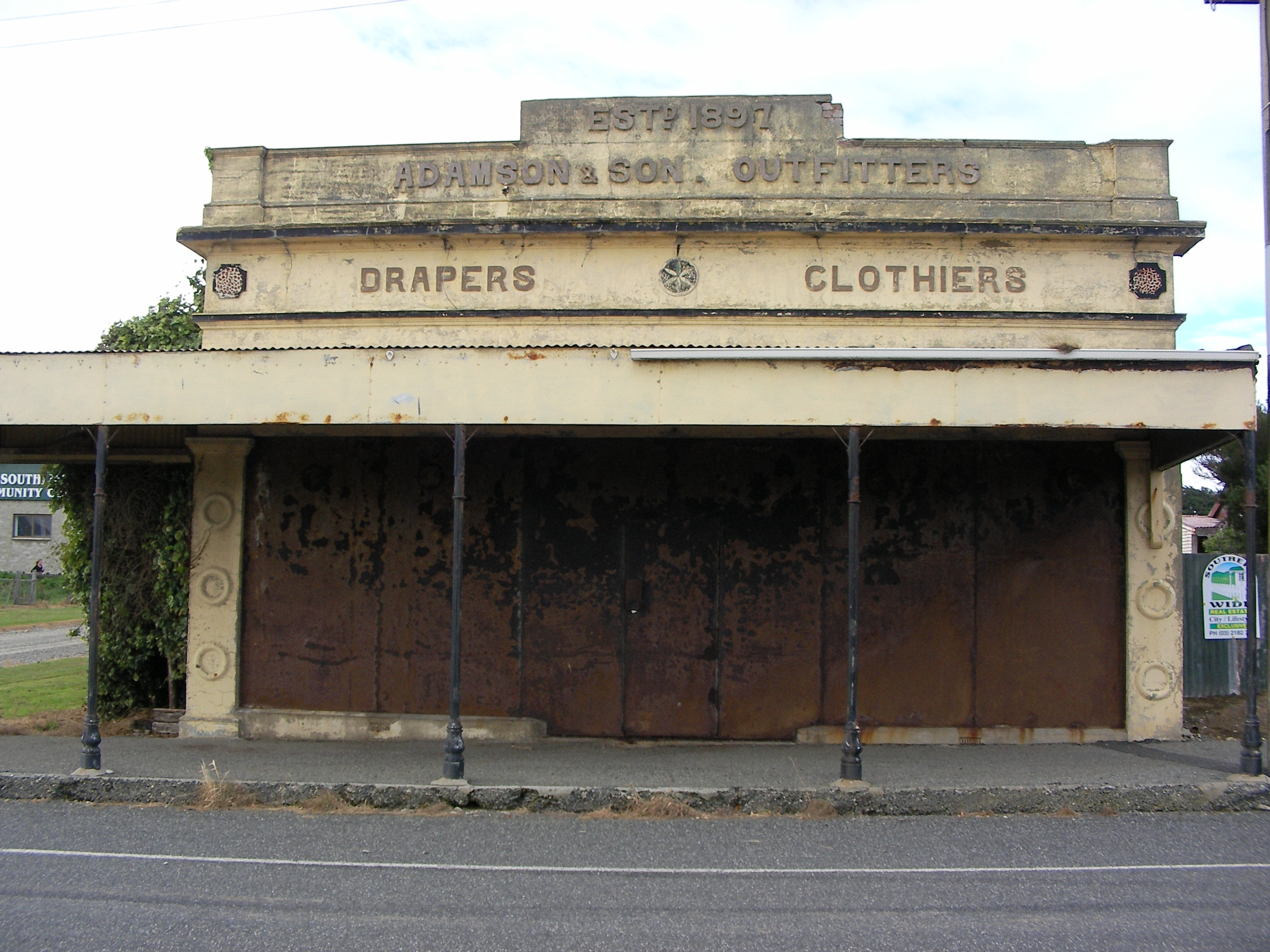
A disused store in Orepuki

In pre-European times, local Māori used the unique and highly prized garnet gemstones on the beach to polish and sharpen their 'toki' or adzes/axes.

According to Māori history several Kāti Māmoe Māori were killed by a tsunami while walking along the beach near Orepuki in the 1820s. They had been gathering fish at the Waiau River mouth in autumn as provisions for the winter period. The beach runs between the sea and a line of cliffs meaning that only a moderate tsunami of 2–4 metres high would have been needed to cause so many deaths. The likely source of the tsunami could have been an earthquake on the Fiordland or Puysegur faults. There are questions around the exact date of this event as it is reliant entirely on unverified unnamed sources.

European sealer John Boultbee noted in 1827 that there was an "old and small" Māori village situated near present-day Orepuki. It seems likely that any trace of this village was washed away by later goldminers and their sluicing activities. The European origins of Orepuki township begin with the discovery of gold in the beaches black sand in 1865. The first tent town of Hirstfield sprung up near Monkey Island (in the lee of which ships anchored). Several years later a slightly more permanent second township was constructed to the north of the present day village, known as Garfield. Mining operations however, dictated that this site was on gold bearing land and the people and their houses, including the school, shifted to the present site to allow further mining.

On 25 May 1885 a branch line railway was opened to Orepuki, providing it with swift transport to Invercargill. On 1 October 1903, a further extension beyond Orepuki was opened and the line ultimately became the Tuatapere Branch. The section of line between Riverton and Tuatapere closed on 30 July 1976. Orepuki station building still stands, relocated to serve other purposes on a farmer's paddock. Other industries to have operated in Orepuki include: sawmilling, coal mining, a shale works , a smelter to extract platinum, a flax mill and farming which remains as the main industry today. An array of old buildings still exist and currently the township supports a pub, a bowling green, a community hall, a church and a population of around 100 people. Orepuki Primary School closed in 2003. By 2014, Orepuki started undergoing a transformation with new houses being built and renovated and the opening of the Orepuki Beach Cafe .

The area is famous for a number of former All Blacks, world champion shearers, and its odd trees which appear to be in a perpetual gale, even in complete calm (frequent strong salt winds from the sea have warped and bent many trees by nearly 90°).

== Etymology ==
The English translation of 'Orepuki' has been subject to numerous theories, with most claiming that the name is a corruption of Aropaki, the traditional Māori name for the area. Numerous potential translations for Aropaki have been suggested, including 'echo' or 'mimic', 'favourable weather', and 'cliffs washed by high tides'. In 1923, Henry P. Young, the former headmaster of Orepuki School, said in a talk to the Southland Branch of the N.Z. Society, published in the Southland Times, that the area's original name meant "a bright area or expanse." Aro-puke, translating as 'crumbling cliffs', has also been proposed as a potential origin for the name. In Ngā Ingoa o Aotearoa: an oral dictionary of Māori placenames, recorded in 1992, local kaumātua (tribal elder) George Te Au offers as pronunciations both Ore-PUki and ō-RĀpaki.

== Nearby attractions ==
Surrounding areas include Pahia, Round Hill, Wakapatu, Ruahine, Colac Bay / Ōraka, Garden Bay, Cosy Nook, Waihoaka, Te Waewae and Te Tua.

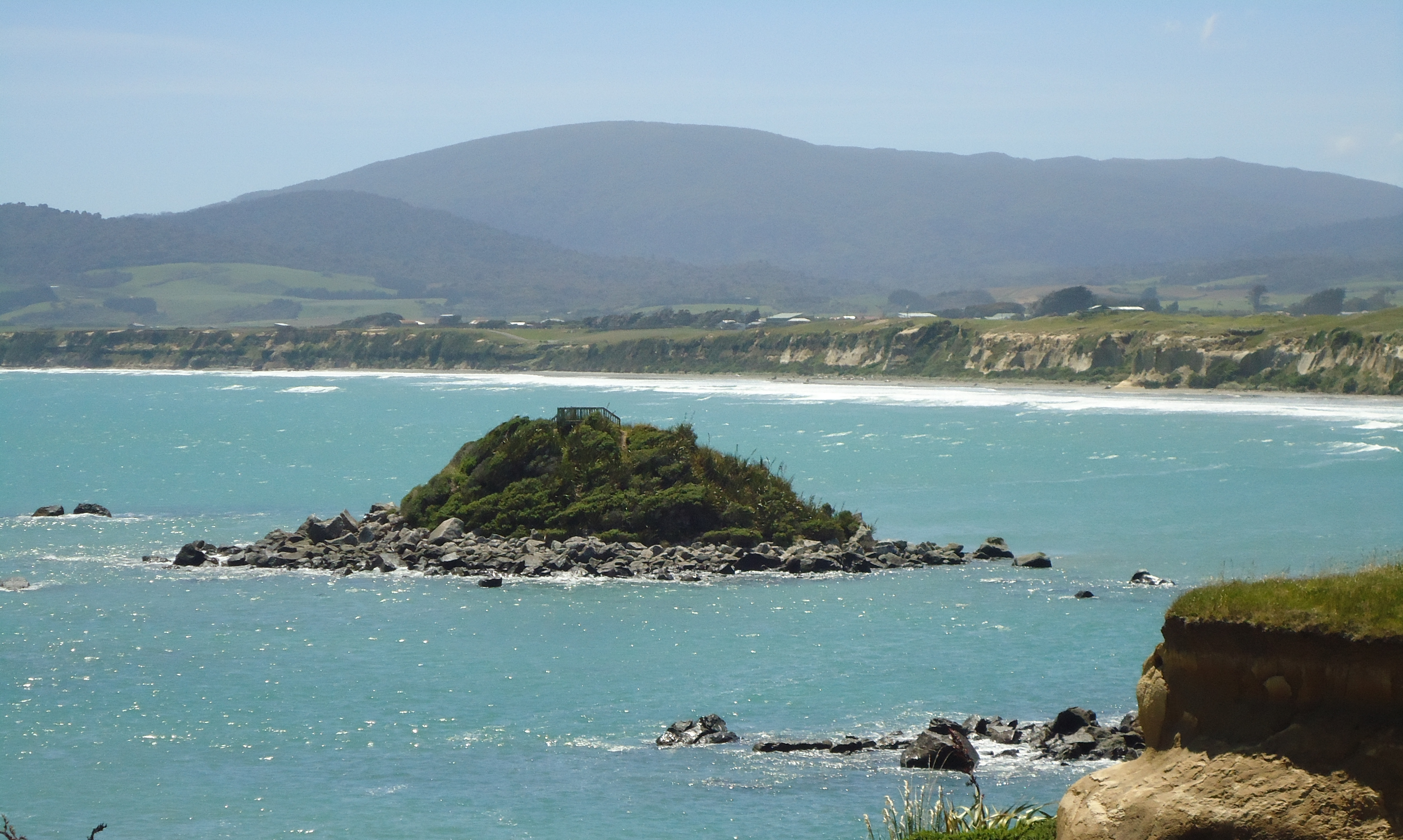
Monkey Island, Orepuki, Southland, New Zealand. Orepuki township in background

- Monkey Island; a small island and mini lagoon off the southern end of the beach. Accessible during low tide, with a small walking track. Local Māori used the island as a traditional lookout for southern right whales and named it 'Te Puka o Tākitimu', or the 'Anchorstone of Tākitimu' waka/canoe.
- Gemstone Beach; situated ½ km north of Orepuki, this wild beach contains semi-precious gemstone such as: garnet, orbicular jasper, garnet sands, rodinguite quartz, semi nephrite, fossil worm casts, oil shale and elusive sapphire.
- McCracken's rest; a rest area that provides spectacular panoramic coastal views from Pahia to the Waiau River mouth and further around to the former timber town of Port Craig.
