= Thornbury, New Zealand =

Town in Southland, New Zealand

Coordinates: 46°17′S 168°06′E

Thornbury is a small township on the east bank of the lower Aparima River, in western Southland, New Zealand. It is approximately 10 km (6.2 mi) northeast of Riverton, and 31 km (19 mi) northwest of Invercargill. It is mainly a farming service community. Local small industries include machinery and transport/trucking companies, and a tannery.

The township was founded by pioneer settlers Matthew Instone and Robert Foster. It was named by Robert Foster after his wife's birthplace, the market town of Thornbury, in Gloucestershire, England.

Originally Thornbury had grown around a railway junction. The railway line from Invercargill split at Thornbury, with one branch going around the coast to Riverton and Tuatapere / Orawia, and the Wairio Branch going inland to the coal mines at Nightcaps. In 1978 the Tuatapere Branch was closed and was eventually removed.

== Education ==
Thornbury School is a co-educational contributing primary school for years 1 to 6 with a roll of 71 students as of November 2024. The school opened on 6 June 1883.
