= Aparima River =

River in Southland, New Zealand

Coordinates: 46°20′S 168°01′E

The Aparima River, earlier known as Jacob's River, is one of the southward-flowing braided rivers of Southland, New Zealand.

== Description ==
The Aparima has its headwaters in the Takitimu Mountains, south of Lake Te Anau, and flows south for 100 kilometres (62 mi) before entering Foveaux Strait near Riverton at the north end of Oreti Beach. A Māori man lived at the mouth of the river who was called Jacob by local whalers, and 'Jacob's River' was in early use for both the river and the settlement that established itself.

It is one of the rivers responsible for the large alluvial plain known as the Southland Plains. It has been identified as an Important Bird Area by BirdLife International because it supports breeding colonies of the endangered black-billed gull.
