= SS Waihora =

Steamships named Waihora include:

- SS Waihora (1882), a passenger cargo ship in service with the Union Steam Ship Company of New Zealand 1882–1903
- SS Waihora (1907), a cargo ship in service with the Union Steam Ship Company of New Zealand 1907–1927
