= List of ships named Holmwood =

Holmwood was a name used for several ships, including -

== Holmwood (–1898) ==
Holmwood (–1898), a four-masted barque, which left Sydney for London in May 1898 and was abandoned on fire in September, probably due to spontaneous combustion of hides in her hold.

== Holmwood (1902–1910) ==
Holmwood (1902–1910), a 1,327 grt 70.1 m (230 ft) x 11 m (36 ft) steel single screw steam cargo ship, with a 159 hp (119 kW) triple expansion engine, built in1901 by the Northumberland Shipbuilding Company and bought by Wm. France, Fenwick & Co. Ltd., London, as the company's first new collier in 1902. She sank on 5 January 1910, whilst carrying coal from Newcastle, after the Aberdonian (1909–1946), a 1,648 grt coastal passenger ship, ran into her, off Orfordness.

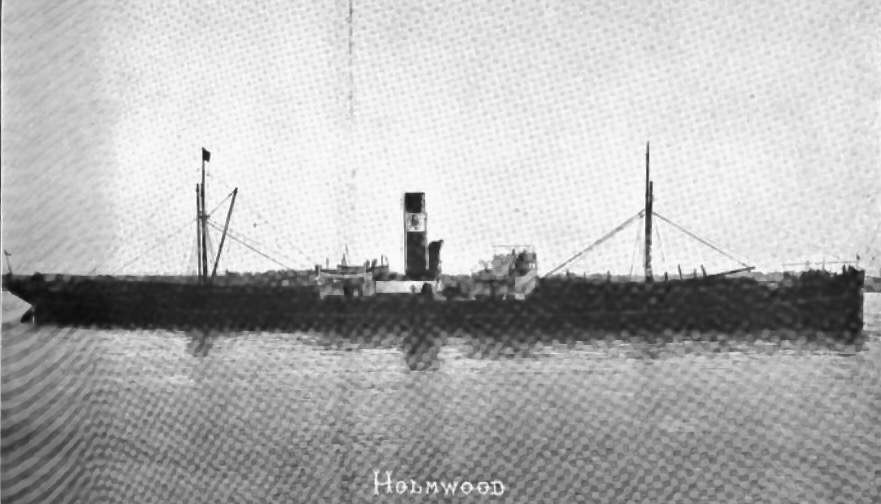
Holmwood about 1913

== Holmwood (1912–1914) ==
Holmwood (1912–1914), was a 4,223 grt, 390 ft (120 m) long, steel, screw, steamer, also built by the Northumberland yard. She left Newport with 6,000 tons of coal and was sunk by the German cruiser SMS Dresden, 170 mi (270 km) off Farol de Santa Marta (near Tubarão, Brazil) on 26 August 1914. The crew were landed at Rio de Janeiro. She was one of four steamers owned by Francis Stanley Holland, of London, the others, also built at the Northumberland yard, being Carlisle Castle (Holtye 1913–1918), Crawford Castle (Hova 1910–1944), and Hollington (1912–1917).

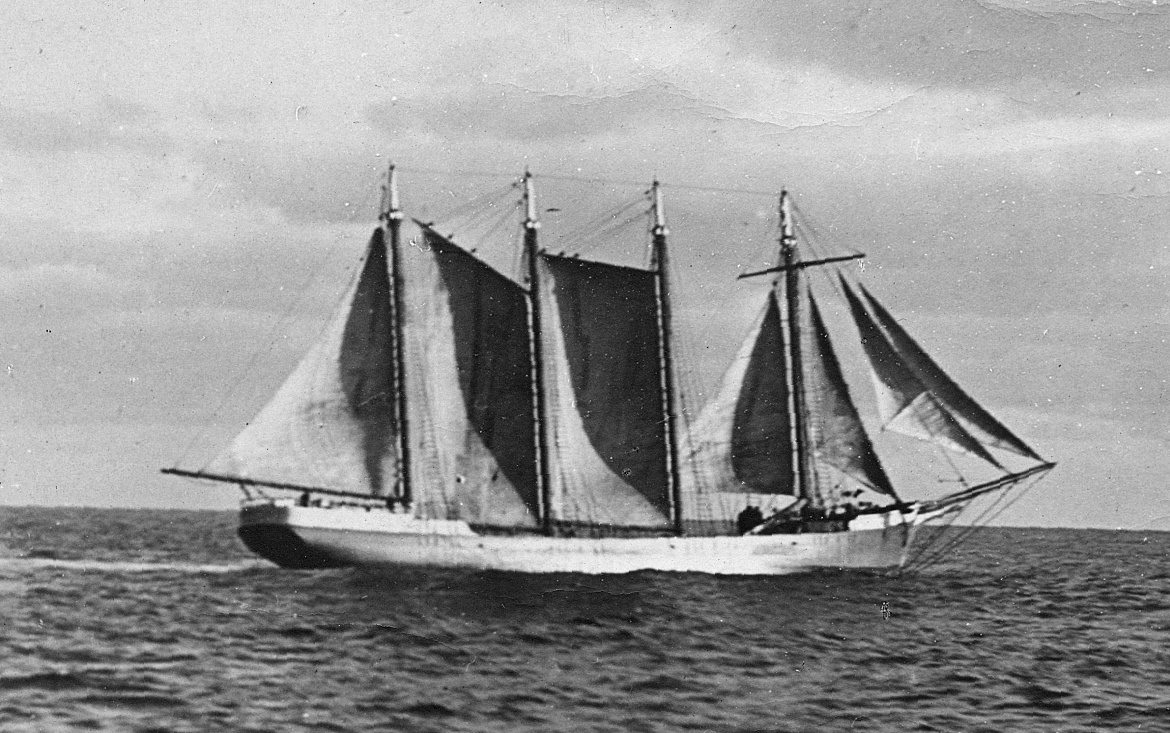
Holmwood 1924

== Forest Home (1900–1924), Holmwood (1924–1939) ==
Forest Home (1900–1939), was bought in 1924 by Holm & Co. She was a four-masted, 682 tons, or 763 tons, schooner, which Holm renamed Holmwood. She was 174 ft (53 m) long. 40 ft (12 m) beam, drew 16.25 ft (4.95 m), had a crew of 15 and was built in 1900 by H. E. Heckendorf at Marshfield for Hicks Lumber Co. Holm converted her at Wellington to carry about 700 tons of coal between Newcastle and Whanganui, though she also served New Plymouth, Prior to purchase there had been a dispute between crew members and the Supreme Court ordered the sale of the ship. About 1931 she was converted to a coal hulk and broken up in 1939 at Te Whanganui / Port Underwood.

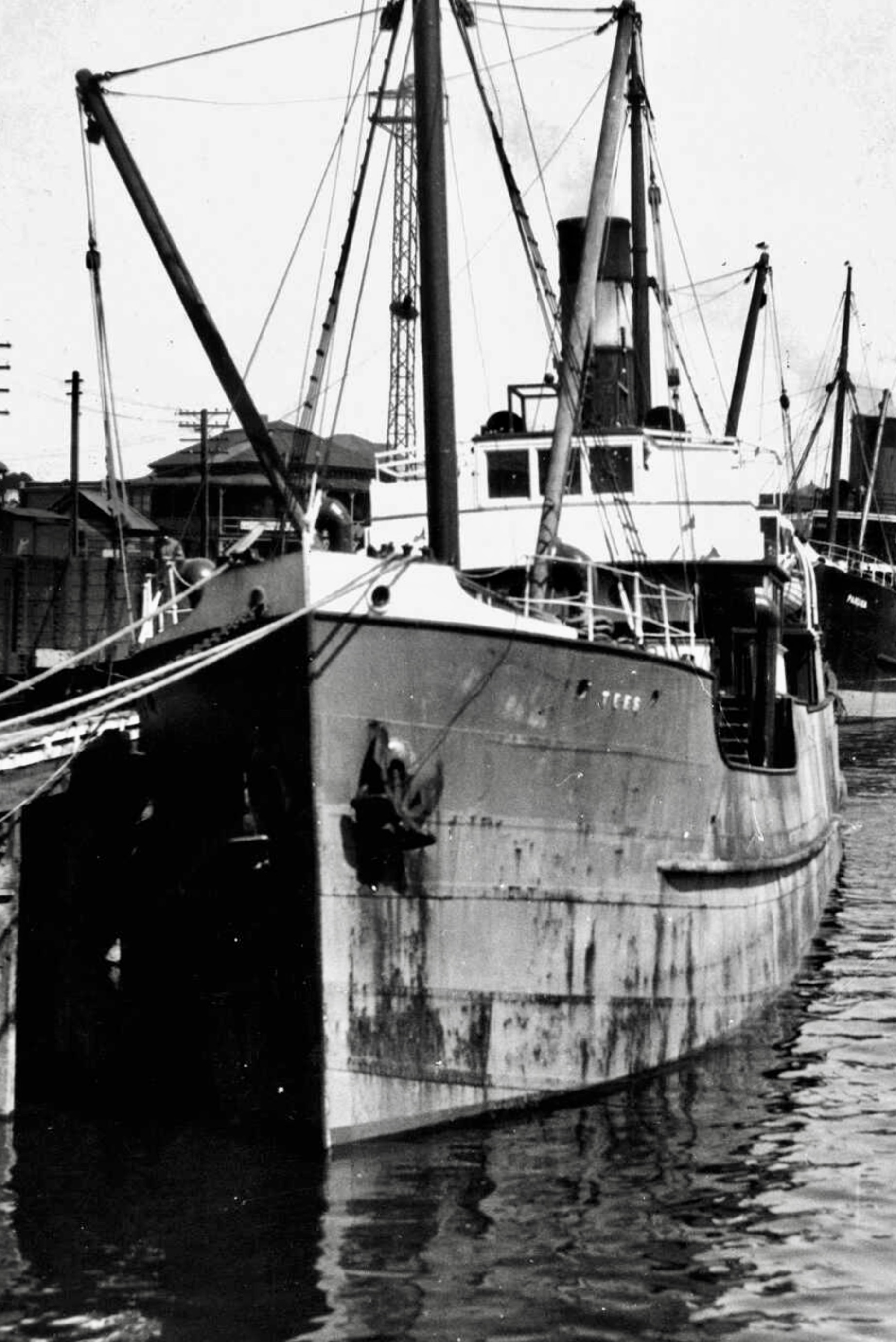
Tees at Greymouth in 1924

== Tees (1911–1940), Holmwood (1940) ==
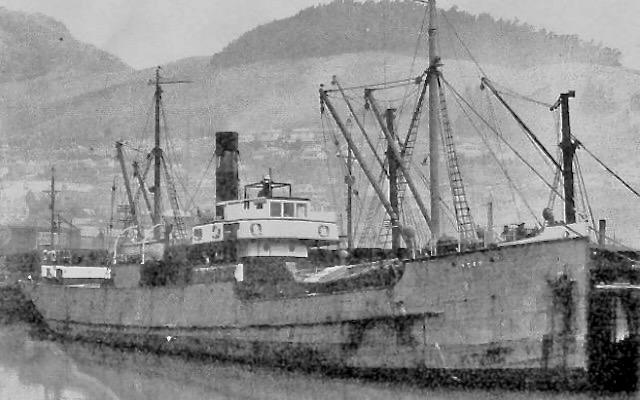
Tees at Greymouth probably 1924

Holmwood (1940) was a new name for an old ship, built as Tees by Goole Shipbuilding & Repairing Co. for Edward P Hutchinson, of Hull, in October 1911. She was 546grt, 165.2 ft (50.4 m), 26.1 ft (8.0 m) wide, her holds were 12.6 ft (3.8 m) deep and a 78 hp (58 kW) steam engine drove her at 9, or 10 kn (19 km/h; 12 mph) In 1917 she was transferred to John Harrison Ltd., Hull / London, in 1922 to Haig Shipping Co. Ltd., King & Co. (Cardiff) Ltd., Cardiff, and at the end of 1922 to Westland Shipping Co. The company, formed in 1922 by Greymouth and Rēkohu (Chatham Island) shareholders, had sent Captain Andrew T Dowell to buy a ship to use between Greymouth, Wellington, Lyttelton and Rēkohu. He arrived from Ardrossan with Tees at Greymouth on 4 April 1923. She could carry 19, or 24 passengers and took about 2 days to cross between Lyttelton and Waitangi. When Westland Shipping went into liquidation, Southern Traders Ltd bought Tees in August 1940, with Holm, their parent company, managing her. In September 1940 she was renamed Holmwood, probably whilst in dry dock at Lyttelton. She was captured 25 mi (40 km) of SW of Rēkohu by the German raiders Orion and Komet, whilst on her third voyage to Lyttelton for Holm & Co, and was sunk by gunfire on 25 November 1940. For some time Holmwood's disappearance was a mystery.

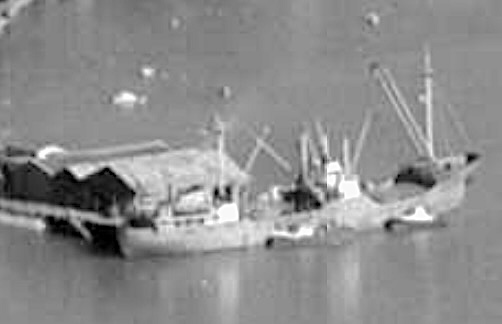
Holmwood at Raglan in 1963

== Holmwood (1953–1971) ==
Holmwood (1953–1971) was the first new vessel in the Holm & Co. fleet. She was launched on 30 October 1952 at the N V Bodewes Scheepswerven yard at Martenshoek. She was 797 grt, 208 ft (63 m) long, 32.1 ft (9.8 m) wide, 13.6 ft (4.1 m) deep and had a draught of 13.3 ft (4.1 m). Her 1,100 bhp (820 kW) Mirrlees Bickerton & Day diesel engines could drive her at 11 kn (20 km/h; 13 mph) with a single screw. She traded between Raglan, Lyttelton and other ports from 1953 to 1969, when Pateke took over on 1 October 1969. Timaru was then a port of call. Holmwood had the usual Holm & Co livery of green funnel and grey hull. Her engine was at the rear of the ship and her bridge and cabins amidships, between her holds. in 1968 Holm & Co. became a wholly owned subsidiary of Union Steam Ship Co., which was owned by P & O. After P & O sold Union to Thomas Nationwide Transport (TNT) of Australia and New Zealand Maritime Holdings Co. in September 1971, the Holm ships were sold. In December 1971 Holmwood was laid up for sale at Nelson and left on 31 October 1972 for Guan Guan Shipping Co. Ltd, of Panama, who renamed her King Fish and ran her between Singapore and Indonesia. In 1975 she was transferred to Guan Guan Shipping (Pte.) Ltd. of Singapore. In 1984 she was sold to Pioneer Shipping Co. of Malé, (managed by Seaward Shipping & Trading Co.) and renamed Pioneer Elite. In July 1985 she was broken up at Gadani Beach by Molasses Trading & Export Co.
