= TEV Wahine =

Wellington–Lyttelton ferry, New Zealand

Coordinates: 41°20′50″S 174°50′20″E

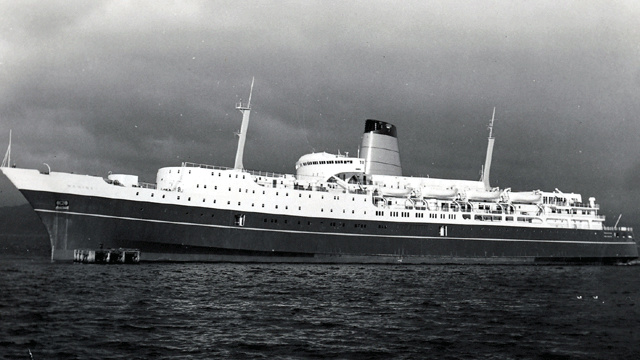
- Wahine at sea

History

New Zealand
- Name: TEV Wahine
- Namesake: Māori: woman
- Owner: Union Steam Ship Company
- Route: Wellington–Lyttelton
- Ordered: October 1963
- Builder: Fairfield Shipbuilding & Engineering
- Yard number: 830
- Laid down: 14 September 1964
- Launched: 14 July 1965
- Completed: June 1966
- Acquired: 24 July 1966
- Maiden voyage: 1 August 1966
- Identification: 317814
- Fate: Wrecked 10 April 1968

General characteristics
- Type: Ferry
- Tonnage: 8,948 GRT
- Length: 488 ft (149 m)
- Beam: 71 ft (22 m)
- Decks: 6
- Propulsion: Turbo-electric transmission; Twin screw and bow thrusters
- Capacity: 927, over 200 cars
- Crew: 126

TEV Wahine was a twin-screw, turbo-electric, roll-on/roll-off passenger ferry. Ordered in 1964, the vessel was built by the Fairfield Shipbuilding and Engineering Company, in Govan, Glasgow, Scotland for the Union Steam Ship Company's Wellington-Lyttelton Steamer Express Service in New Zealand.

The Wahine began transporting passengers on day and overnight trips on New Zealand's inter-island route between the ports of Wellington and Lyttelton in 1966. The Wahine was permitted to carry a maximum of 1,100 passengers on day trips, or 927 berthed passengers on overnight trips.

On 10 April 1968, near the end of a routine northbound overnight crossing from Lyttelton, Wahine was caught in a fierce storm stirred by tropical cyclone Giselle. She ran aground on Barrett Reef, then drifted and capsized and sank in the shallow waters near Steeple Rock at the mouth of Wellington Harbour. Of the 734 people on board, 51 people died from drowning, exposure to the elements, or from injuries sustained in the hurried evacuation and abandonment of the stricken vessel.

The unfolding shipwreck drama was covered by radio and television crews, as the Wahine ran aground within a short distance of New Zealand's capital city, Wellington. Newspaper crews, and other journalists and photographers, provided immediate news coverage documenting the passenger rescue and loss of life.

== Background ==
TEV Wahine was designed and built for the Union Steamship Company of New Zealand, and was one of many ferries that have linked New Zealand's North and South Islands. The first regular interisland ferry service between Wellington and Picton began in 1875, and the first Wellington – Lyttelton service began in 1895 with the Union Steamship Company vessel SS Penguin. Since then ferries have plied Cook Strait and the Kaikōura Coast, transporting passengers and cargo between Wellington in the north and Picton or Lyttelton in the south. From 1933 the Union Company's Wellington – Lyttelton service was marketed as the "Steamer Express". The introduction of Wahine in 1966 enabled the withdrawal of TEV Rangatira (1930–1967) from service in 1965 and TEV Hinemoa (1945–1971) in 1966 and the sale of both Rangatira and Hinemoa in 1967.

== Construction ==
Wahine was built by the Fairfield Shipbuilding and Engineering Company in Govan, Glasgow, Scotland. Plans were made by the Union Company in 1961, and her keel was laid on 14 September 1964 as Hull No. 830. Built of steel, her hull was completed in ten months, and she was christened and launched on 14 July 1965 by the Union Company's director's wife. Wahine's machinery, cargo spaces and passenger accommodations were installed in the following months and she was completed in June 1966. She left Greenock, Scotland for New Zealand on 18 June 1966 and arrived at Wellington on 24 July 1966; she sailed on her maiden voyage to Lyttelton one week later, on 1 August.

Wahine was 148.7 metres (488 ft) long, had a beam of 21.6 m (71 ft) and was 8,948 gross register tons (GRT). At the time Wahine was the Union Company's largest ship and one of the world's largest passenger ferries. The powerplant was turbo-electric transmission, with four boilers supplying steam to two turbo alternators that drove the twin main propellers and gave a top speed of 22 knots (41 km/h). The ship also had stern and bow thruster propellers to propel her sideways for easier berthing. She had stabilisers that halved the frequency and amount she rolled.

The hull was divided by 13 watertight bulkheads into 14 watertight compartments. The lifeboat complement was eight large fibreglass lifeboats, two 7.9-metre (26 ft) motor lifeboats each with a capacity of 50 people, six 9.4-metre (31 ft) standard lifeboats each with a capacity of 99 people, and additionally 36 inflatable rafts, each with a capacity of 25 people.

== Service ==
Wahine entered service on 1 August 1966 with her first sailing from Wellington replacing TEV Hinemoa (1947–1967). Between then and the end of the year, she made 67 crossings to Lyttelton. From August 1966, TEV Wahine and TEV Maori (1953–1972) provided a two-ship regular overnight service between Wellington and Lyttelton, with one ship departing from each port each night and crossing during the night. The arrival of Wahine enabled Hinemoa to be withdrawn from service and subsequently sold. TEV Rangatira (1931–1965) had last sailed on 14 December 1965.

On a normal crossing Wahine's crew complement was usually 126. In the deck department, the master, three officers, one radio operator and 19 sailors managed the overall operation, and in the engine department, eight engineers, two electricians, one donkeyman and 12 general workers supervised the operation of the engines. In the victualling department, 60 stewards, seven stewardesses, five cooks and four pursers catered to the needs of the passengers.

On trips made during the day Wahine could carry 1,100 passengers, and on overnight crossings 927, in over 300 single-, two-, three- and four-berth cabins, with two dormitory-style cabins each sleeping 12 passengers. Common areas included a cafeteria, lounge, smoke room, gift shop, two enclosed promenades and open decks. Wahine had two vehicle decks with a combined capacity for more than 200 cars.

== Disaster ==
Wahine disaster
- A photo of TEV Wahine listing starboard
- Date: 10 April 1968; 58 years ago
- Location: Barrett Reef
- Type: Capsizing
- Participants: Total: 733; Crew: 123; Passengers: 610
- Deaths: Total: 53: 51 on the day; 1 weeks later; 1 on 15 October, 1990

On the evening of 9 April 1968, Wahine departed from Lyttelton for a routine overnight crossing to Wellington, carrying 610 passengers and 123 crew.

=== Weather conditions ===
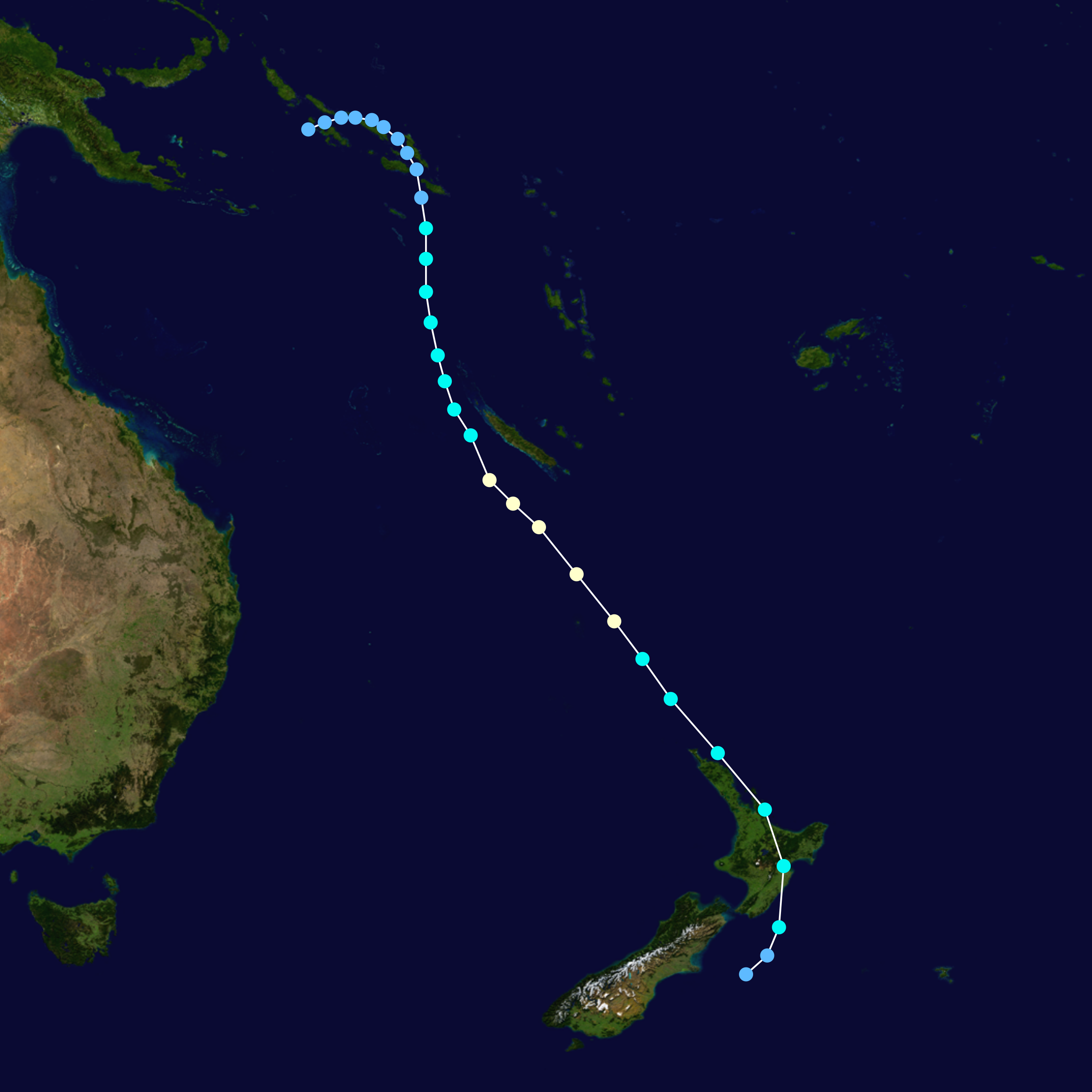
Track of Cyclone Giselle

In the early morning of Wednesday, 10 April, two violent storms merged over Wellington, creating a single extratropical cyclone that was the worst recorded in New Zealand's history. Cyclone Giselle was heading south after causing much damage in the north of the North Island. It hit Wellington at the same time as another storm that had driven up the West Coast of the South Island from Antarctica. The winds in Wellington were the strongest ever recorded there. At one point, the wind reached 275 km/h (171 mph) and in one Wellington suburb the wind ripped off the roofs of 98 houses. Three ambulances and a truck were blown onto their sides when they tried to go into the area to rescue injured people.

As the storms hit Wellington Harbour, Wahine was making her way out of Cook Strait on the last leg of her journey. Although there had been weather warnings when she set out from Lyttelton, there was no indication that storms would be severe or any worse than those often experienced by vessels crossing Cook Strait.

=== Grounding ===
At 05:50, with winds gusting at between 100 and 155 km/h (62 and 96 mph), Captain Hector Gordon Robertson decided to enter the harbour. Twenty minutes later the winds had increased to 160 km/h (99 mph), and Wahine lost her radar. A huge wave pushed her off course and in line with Barrett Reef. Robertson was unable to turn the ship back on course, and decided to keep turning around and back out to sea.

For 30 minutes Wahine battled into the waves and wind, but by 06:10 she was not answering her helm and the engines had stopped responding. At 06:40, the ship was driven onto the southern tip of Barrett Reef, near the harbour entrance less than a mile from shore. She drifted along the reef, shearing off her starboard propeller and gouging a large hole in her hull on the starboard side of the stern, beneath the waterline. Passengers were told that the ferry was aground but that there was no immediate danger. They were directed to don their lifejackets and report to their muster stations as a routine "precautionary measure".

The storm continued to grow more intense. The wind increased to over 250 km/h (160 mph) and Wahine dragged her anchors and drifted into the harbour. At about 11:00, close to the western shore at Seatoun, the anchors finally held. At about the same time the tug Tapuhi reached Wahine and tried to attach a line and bring her in tow, but after 10 minutes the line broke. Other attempts failed, but the deputy harbourmaster, Captain Galloway, managed to climb aboard from the pilot boat.

Throughout the morning, the danger of the ship sinking seemed to pass as the vessel's location was in an area where the water depth did not exceed 10 metres (33 ft), and the crew's worst-case scenario was the clean-up once the vessel either arrived in Wellington or had grounded in shallower water. There was indication that the ship would even sail again that evening as usual, albeit later than scheduled while the damage done by the reef was repaired.

=== 'Abandon ship' and foundering ===
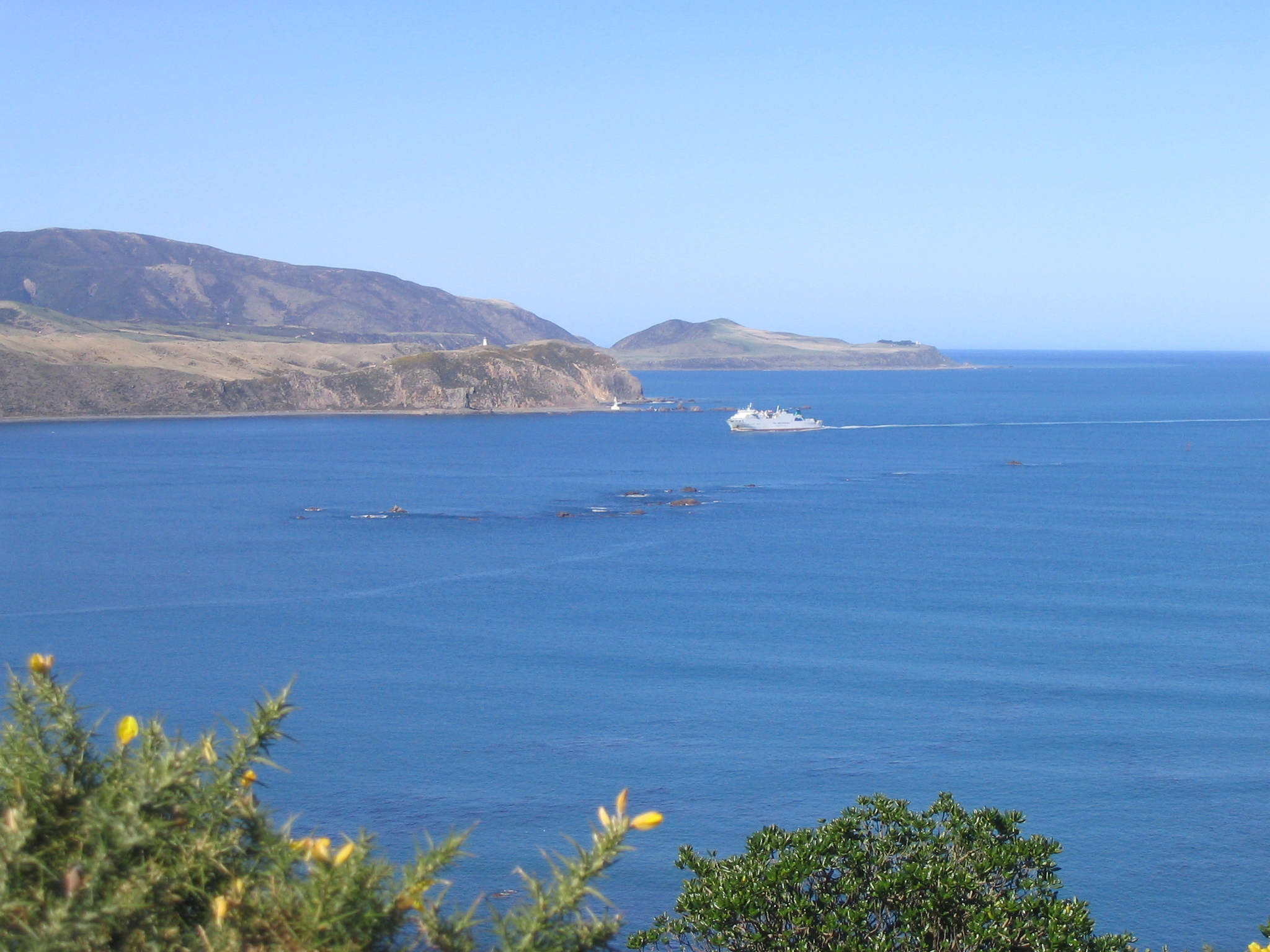
looking east on a calm day over the entry of Wellington Harbour, where the disaster occurred. The ferry entering the harbour is Aratere.

Wahine listing heavily to starboard

Around 13:15, the combined effect of the tide and the storm swung Wahine around, providing a patch of clear water sheltered from the wind. As she suddenly listed further and reached the point of no return, Robertson gave the order to abandon ship. In an instance similar to what had occurred during the sinking of the Italian passenger liner Andrea Doria off the coast of New England in 1956, the severe starboard list left the four lifeboats on the port side useless: only the four on the starboard side could be launched. The first starboard motor lifeboat, boat S1, capsized shortly after being launched. Those aboard were thrown into the water, and many were drowned in the rough sea, including two children and several elderly passengers. Survivor Shirley Hick, remembered for losing two of her three children in the disaster, recalled this event vividly, as her three-year-old daughter Alma drowned in this lifeboat. Some managed to hold onto the overturned boat as it drifted across the harbour to the eastern shore, towards Eastbourne.

The three remaining standard lifeboats, which, according to a number of survivors, were severely overcrowded, did manage to reach shore. Lifeboat S2 reached Seatoun beach on the western side of the channel with about 70 passengers and crew, as did Lifeboat S4, which was severely overcrowded with over 100 people. Heavily overcrowded Lifeboat S3 landed on the beach near Eastbourne, about 5 kilometres (3 mi) away on the opposite side of the channel.

Wahine launched her life rafts, but waves up to 6 metres (20 ft) high capsized some of them and many people were killed. She sank in 11.6 metres (38 ft) of water. forcing hundreds of passengers and crew into the rough sea. When the weather cleared, the sight of Wahine foundering in the harbour led many vessels to race to the scene, including the ferry GMV Aramoana, tugs, fishing boats, yachts and small personal craft. They rescued hundreds of people. Over 200 passengers and crew reached the rocky shore of the east side of the channel, south of Eastbourne. As this area was desolate and unpopulated, many survivors were exposed to the elements for several hours while rescue teams tried to navigate the gravel road along the shoreline. It was here that a number of bodies were recovered. At about 14:30, Wahine rolled completely onto her starboard side.

Some of the survivors reached the shore, only to die of exhaustion or exposure. Fifty-one people died at the time, and two more died later from their injuries, 53 victims in all. Most of the victims were middle-aged or elderly, but the toll included three children; victims dying from drowning, exposure or injuries from being battered on the rocks. 566 passengers were safe, as were 110 crew.

== Disaster aftermath ==
=== Investigation ===
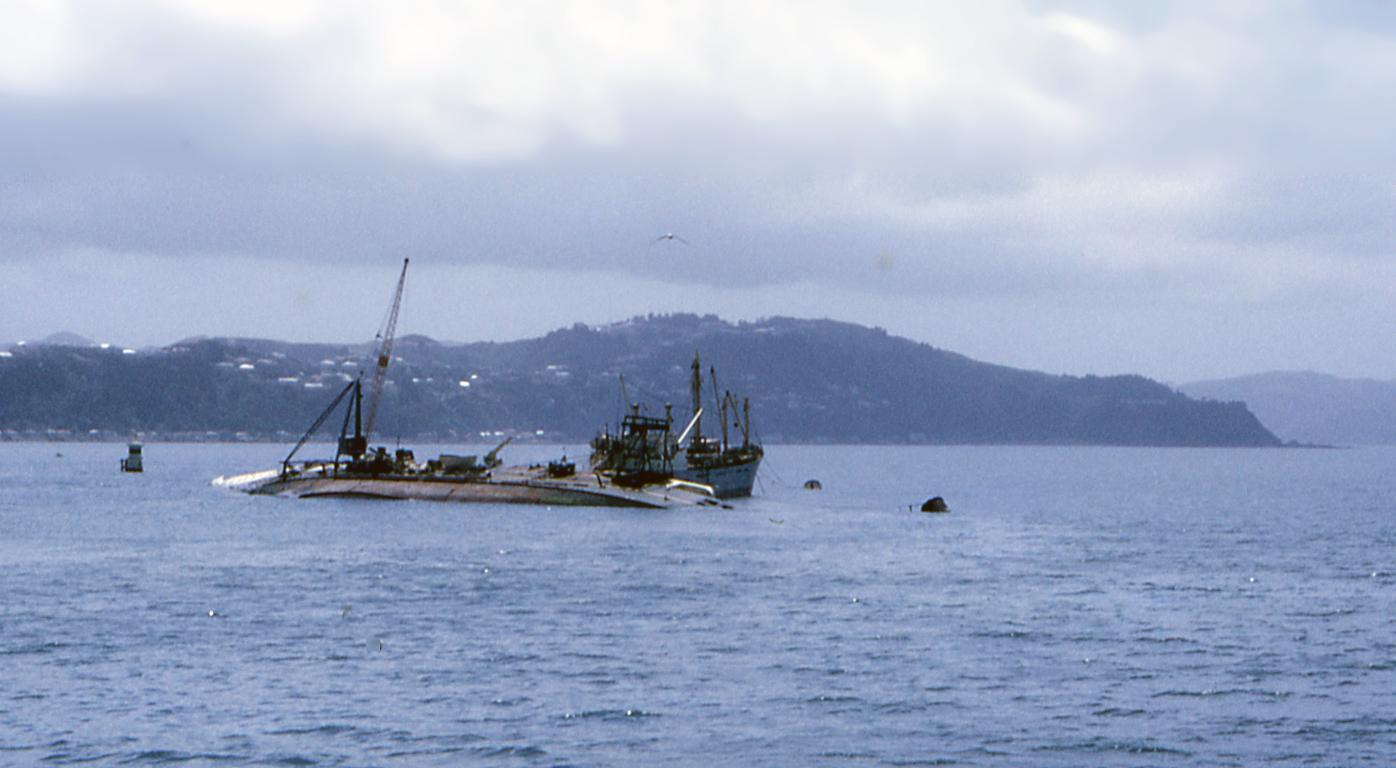
Salvage operations under way two weeks after the disaster

Ten weeks after the disaster, a court of inquiry found errors of judgement had been made, but stressed that the conditions at the time had been difficult and dangerous. The free surface effect caused Wahine to capsize due to a build-up of water on the vehicle deck, although several specialist advisers to the inquiry believed that she had grounded a second time, taking on more water below decks.

The report of the inquiry stated that more lives would almost certainly have been lost if the order to abandon ship had been given earlier or later. The storm was so strong that rescue craft would not have been able to help passengers any earlier than about midday. Charges were brought against Wahine's officers but all were acquitted.

Early hopes that the ship could be salvaged were abandoned when the magnitude of structural damage became clear. As the wreck was a navigational hazard, preparations were made over the next year to refloat her and tow her into Cook Strait for scuttling. However a similar storm in 1969 broke up the wreck, and it was dismantled (partly by the Hikitia floating crane) where it lay.

=== Memorials ===
Wahine Memorial Park marks the disaster with a bow thruster, near where the survivors reached the shore at Seatoun. J. G. Churchill Park in Seatoun has a memorial plaque, the ship's anchor and chain, and replica ventilators. A plaque and the foremast are at the parking area near Burdans Gate on the eastern side of the harbour, on the coast where many of the survivors and dead washed up. The main mast forms another memorial in Frank Kitts Park in central Wellington. The Wellington Museum has a permanent commemorative exhibition on its maritime floor that includes artifacts and a film about the storm and the sinking.

== Replacement ==
It was more than a year before the Union Company ordered a ferry to replace Wahine. In May 1969 it ordered TEV Rangatira, built by a different British shipyard and to a new design. She had accommodation for 159 fewer passengers, and like Wahine could carry more than 200 cars.

Rangatira did not enter service until March 1972, almost four years after Wahine was wrecked. She was a commercial failure, carrying on average only just over half the number of passengers and a third of the vehicles for which she had capacity. From 1974 the NZ Ministry of Transport subsidised the "Steamer Express", but in 1976 it withdrew the subsidy and the service ceased.
