= List of ships named Talune =

A number of ships have borne the name Talune. They include:

- SS Talune, built in 1890 and scuttled in 1925, a passenger and freight steamship employed in the Tasman Sea and South Seas trades
- SS Talune, built in 1930 for the Union Steamship company of New Zealand and sold in 1959 to Transporte de Minerales, Panama, which renamed it the Amos.
- Talune, a 30-foot (9.1 m) motor launch, built in Hobart, Tasmania in 1914 and destroyed by fire at her moorings at Maria Island, Tasmania on 6 July 1929.
