= Tasmanian Steam Navigation Company =

Australian steam ship company

Tasmanian Steam Navigation Company Limited was an Australian steaming company, formed in Hobart in 1853 and defunct in 1922 after a series of acquisitions. It operated a shipping service from Tasmania to Mainland Australia, later expanded to New Zealand.

== History ==
The company was formed in Hobart, Tasmania in 1853 to operate a shipping service from Tasmania to Mainland Australia, and expanded its routes into New Zealand in 1864. It took over the Launceston & Melbourne Steam Navigation Company in 1865 after the sinking of the City of Launceston.

From 1889 there was a three-way battle between the Union Steam Ship Company of New Zealand, Huddart Parker and the Tasmanian Steam Navigation Company (TSNCo) on the Tasmanian routes (Melbourne-Launceston, Hobart-Melbourne and Hobart-Sydney). The TSNCo did not have other routes to absorb their Tasmanian losses, and was bought out by the Union Company in 1891 but continued to trade under TSNCo flag. EM Fisher regarded a Union Company takeover as the lesser of two evils.

In 1921 Huddart Parker and the Union Line formed a joint partnership company called Tasmanian Steamers to operate ferry services across the Bass Strait. on 1 January 1922 all remaining vessels belonging to TSNCo were transferred to Tasmanian Steamers.

== Fleet ==
- SS City of Hobart
- SS Corinna
- SS Derwent
- SS Esk
- SS Flinders
- SS Flora
- SS Havilah
- SS Mangana
- SS Oonah
- SS Pateena
- SS Southern Cross
- SS Talune
- SS Tamar
- SS Tasman
- SS Tasmania
