= Holmbank =

Norwegian ship

Holmbank was a Norwegian ship built in 1948 and launched as Anne. It sank in New Zealand in 1963.

== Construction ==
Holmbank was of steel construction, built in the yard of Bergens Mek Verk, Bergen, Norway. Launched in 1948, Holmbank had a gross tonnage of 515 tons. Length 53m, beam 8.6m, draft 3.7m.

Powered by diesel engines, Holmbank was propelled by a single screw. When sailing in New Zealand, it was one of the first vessels on the New Zealand coast with a controllable pitch propeller.

== Ownership and name changes ==
Holmbank was named Anne when launched in 1948, being renamed Sunny Girl the following year. Bought by a New Zealand company, the vessel was renamed Turihau in 1952, before finally being renamed Holmbank in 1962 when bought by Holm Shipping Company.

== Voyages ==
Holmbank was employed in coastal trade throughout New Zealand from 1952 until 1963. Between 1952 and 1961, while named Turihau, the vessel was involved in four casualty incidents. In 1952 it struck a submerged rock off Tuahine Point. In 1954, damage was sustained while berthing in a gale in Auckland. In 1955 Holmbank struck twice on submerged rocks, first on Great Mercury Island, and later on Walker Rock, off Cape Jackson.

== Final voyage ==
On 19 September 1963, Holmbank sailed from Timaru, bound for Wellington with 400 tons of general cargo. It had a crew numbering 16, and was commanded by a Captain Home. Around the southern coast of Banks Peninsula, Holmbank's course was calculated to pass within 2 miles of the Akaroa light. The light was obscured in fog, and a current brought the vessel very close to the shore, unknown to the crew. By the time the Akaroa light would have been in range, it was obscured by high ground, the ship being so close to the shore.

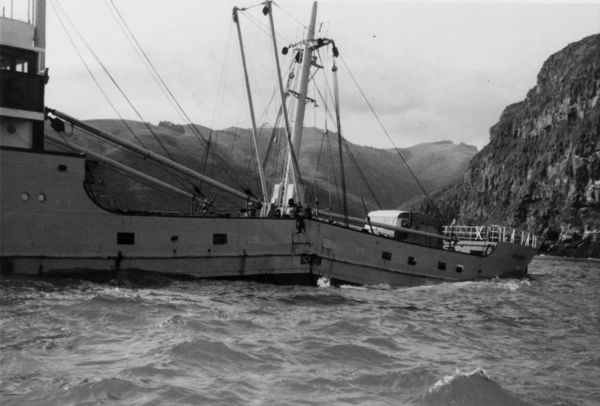
Holmbank, on 20 September 1963, aground on Whale Rock and breaking up.

At 8.22pm on the night of 19 September, Holmbank ran aground at full speed, striking Whale Rock, 200 m from the cliffs at the northern entrance to Piraki Bay. The ship was inspected under the water and found to be unsalvageable. 48 hours later, Holmbank sank.

== Wreck ==
The wreck lies where it sank in 15m – 25m of water. It is considered a dangerous dive site due to strong tidal set and heavy swell.
