= Flinders (ship) =

Several vessels have been named Flinders after British explorer Matthew Flinders (1774–1814), including:

- Flinders was a schooner built in 1863 at Brisbane Water as Jenny Cox and owned and renamed by the South Australian Colonial Government between 1865 and 1873, when she sprang a leak and was beached.
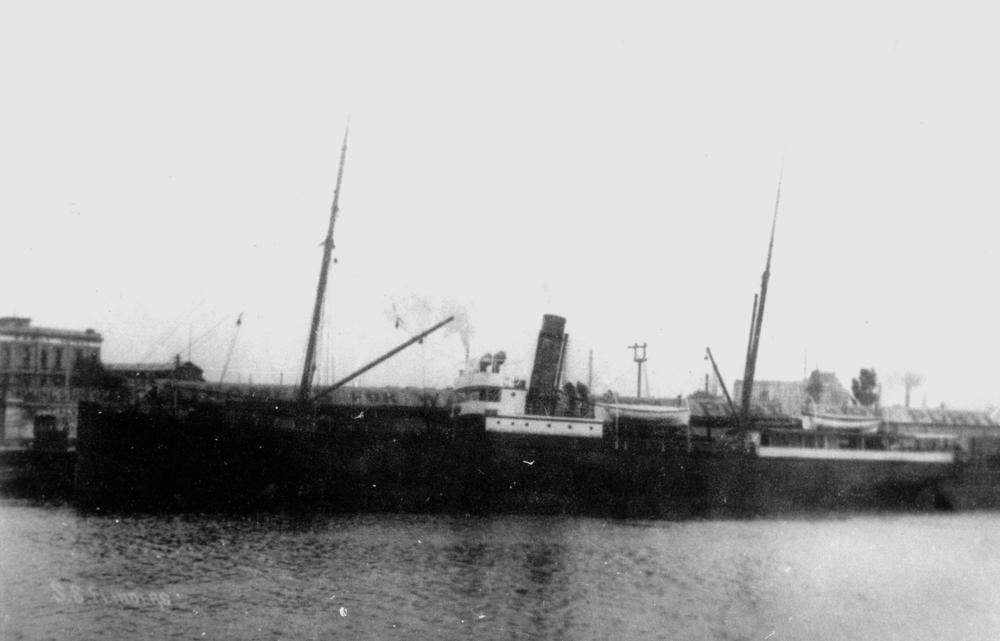
- Flinders (1878)
  SS Flinders (1878) was a passenger-cargo steamer of 948 GRT built by A & J Inglis Ltd, Pointhouse, Glasgow for the Tasmanian Steam Navigation Company, Hobart, which merged with Union Steam Ship Company of New Zealand. She was later in the fleets of McIlwraith, McEacharn & Co and Adelaide Steamship Company, and then hulked in 1911 after being damaged by fire and abandoned at Garden Island Ships Graveyard, where she remains.
- HMS Flinders was a Royal Navy survey ship, completed in 1919 by Lobnitz & Co, Renfrew. She was laid down as the Aberdare-class minesweeper Radley but repurposed during construction. Flinders became an accommodation ship in 1940, then was a blockship at Poole from 1942. She was broken up at Falmouth in 1945.
- HMAS Flinders (GS 312) was a hydrographic survey ship in service from 1973 to 1998.
- HMAS Flinders (FFG) is the intended name of a Hunter-class frigate that is expected to enter service in the late-2020s.
