= Holm & Co =

New Zealand ship owners

Holm & Co were ship owners, ship brokers and stevedores based in Wellington, New Zealand. They were agents for Australian and other foreign airways and shipping lines.

The business was founded by Swedish-born Captain Pehr Ferdinand Holm (1844–1917) when he bought the barque Genevie M Tucker in 1889. He had settled in Wellington in 1868. His last sailing ship was the barquentine Titania wrecked off Nouméa in 1914 when the lighthouse was under a wartime blackout. Two sons became marine engineers and two became master mariners. Sydney Holm ran the business before his father died and thereafter. A company was incorporated to take ownership of the business in 1918 with offices in the Huddart Parker Line building in Wellington's Post Office Square.

The Union Steam Ship Company took a controlling shareholding in 1930.

In 1968 Richardson & Co and Canterbury Steam Ship Company joined Holm & Co and the three businesses became subsidiaries of Union Steam.

Shipping services were provided to:

- New Zealand's coast extending to the Chatham Islands, Norfolk Island, Raoul Island, Campbell Island.
- Australia (timber trade only), Japan, and passengers from Australia via Italy to England.
- Refrigerated cargo to Honolulu and the Pacific coast of North America.

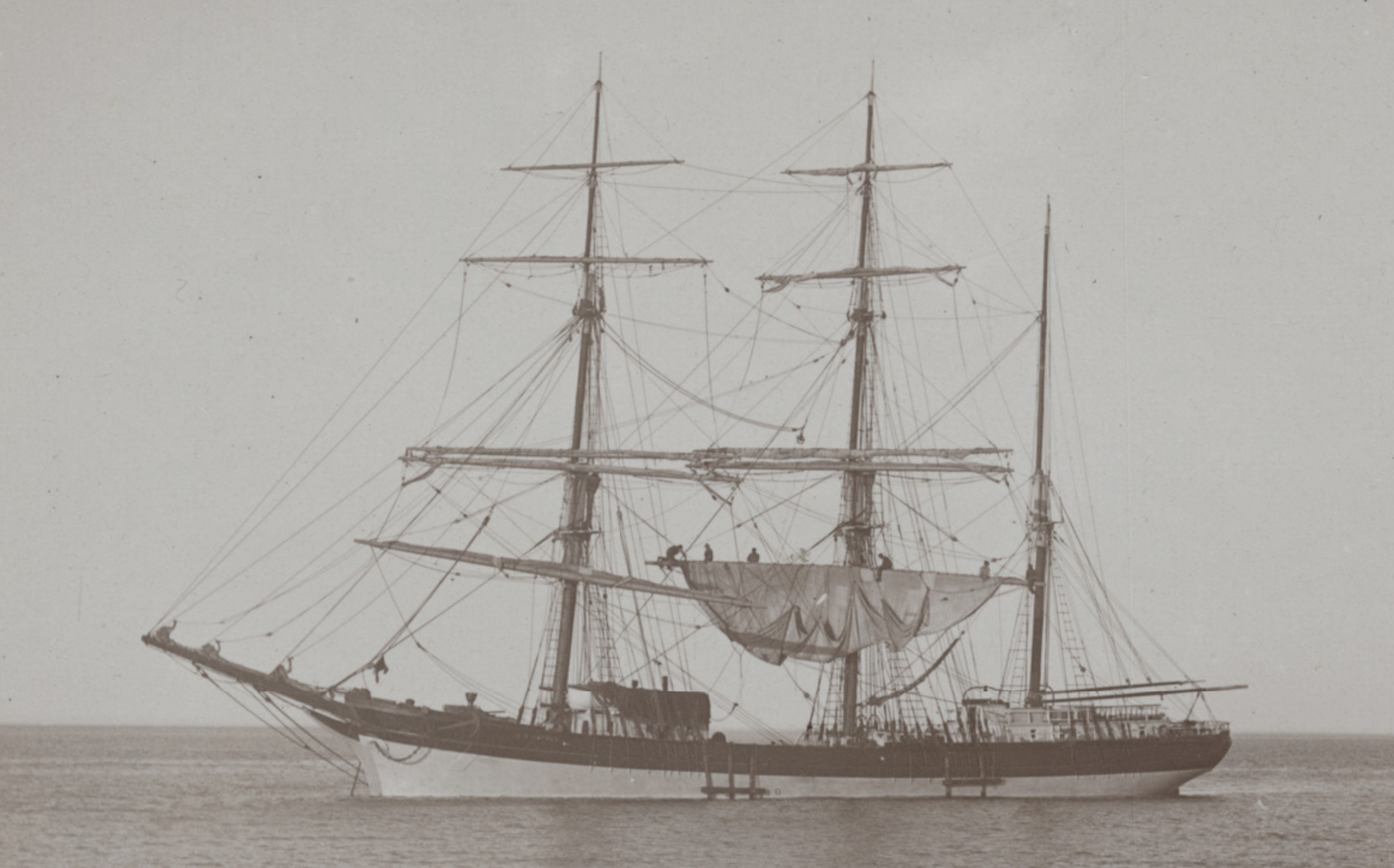
Genevie M. Tucker barque

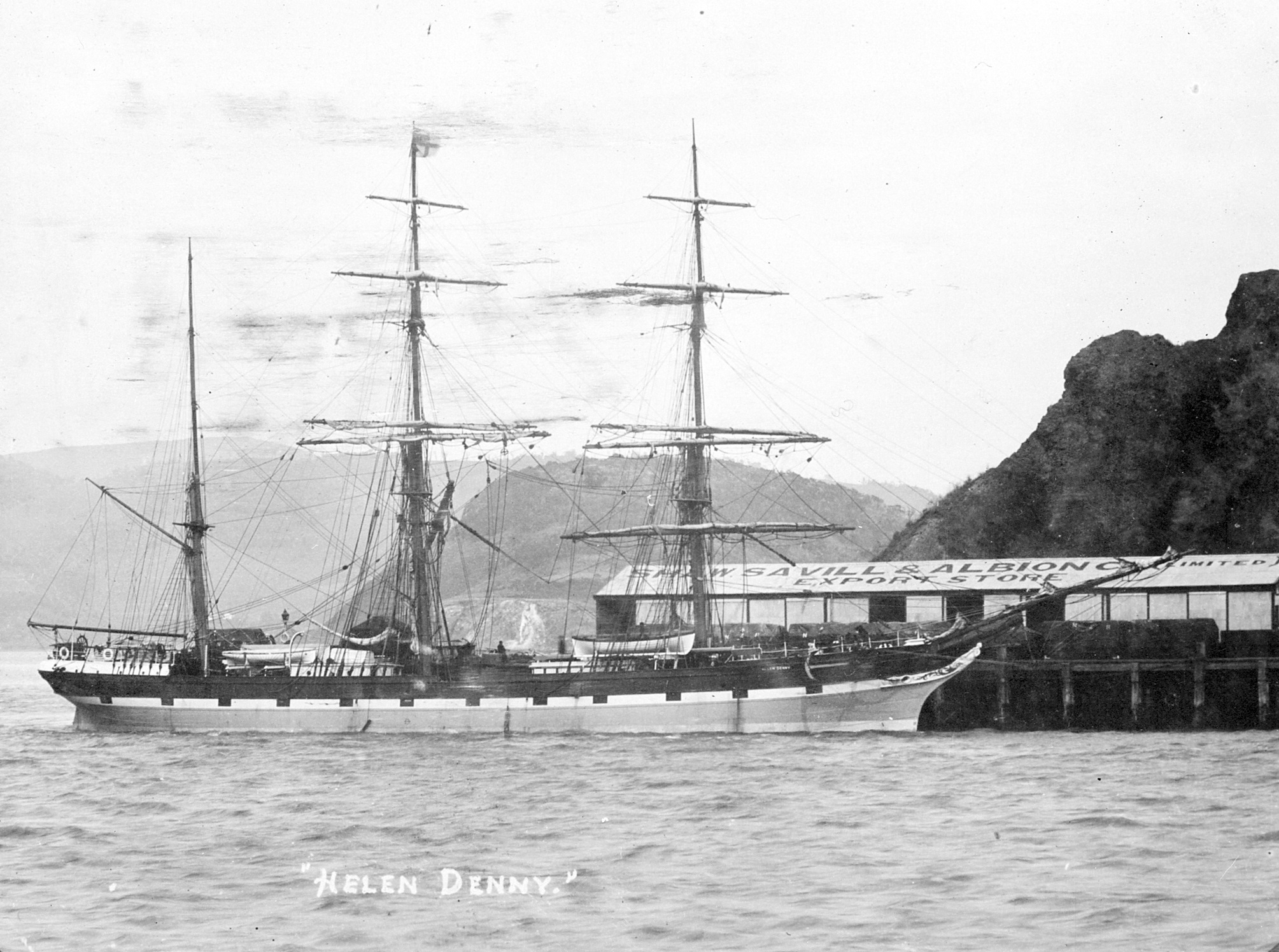
Helen Denny barque

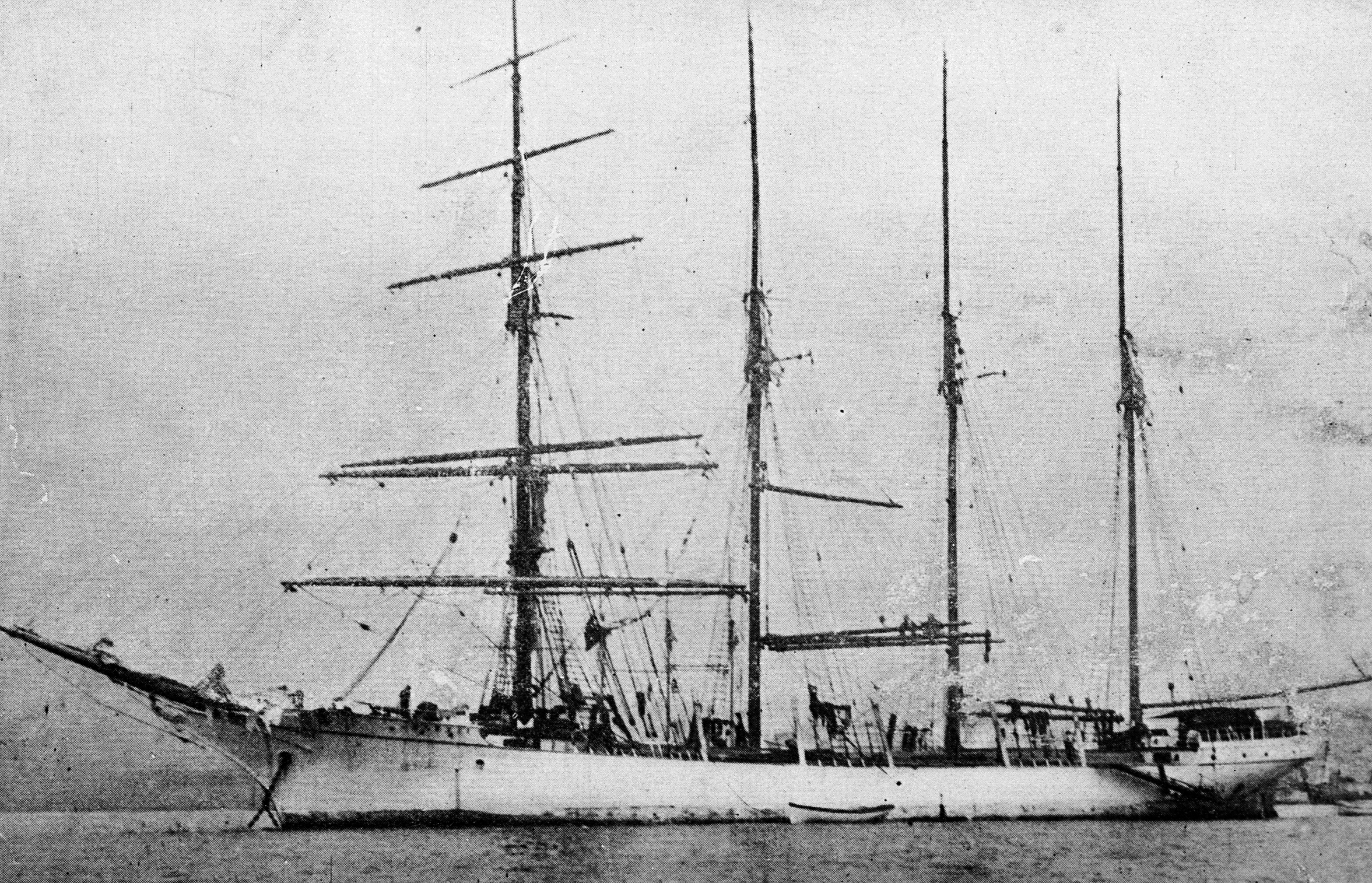
Titania barquentine

Holm & Co's ships included:

Genevie M. Tucker
Helen Denny
John
Titania
Progress
Holmdale (Kylebeg)
Holmwood (Forest Home)
Holmglen (previously Argus)
Holmlea (Parera) chartered 1934, bought 1935, renamed 1936 - 555grt triple-expansion steamer, built 1921 by Goole Shipbuliding, sold 1949 and renamed as the Stone Fleet ship, Kiama (2nd)
Holmlea (Seaway Princess) bought 1969 from Northern Steamship, renamed 1970 - 1,053 grt, stern door roll-on/roll-off, built 1967 by Hong Kong & Whampoa Dock Co, sold 1975
Holmburn (Port Whangarei)
Holmwood (Tees)
Port Waikato
Holmwood
Holmglen
Holmburn
Holmdale
Holmbank (previously Anne)
Holmbrae (previously)
Holmpark (previously)
Gael
Wakanui
Marlyn
Picton (previously Koau)
Parer
