= Pehr Ferdinand Holm =

New Zealand mariner and shipowner

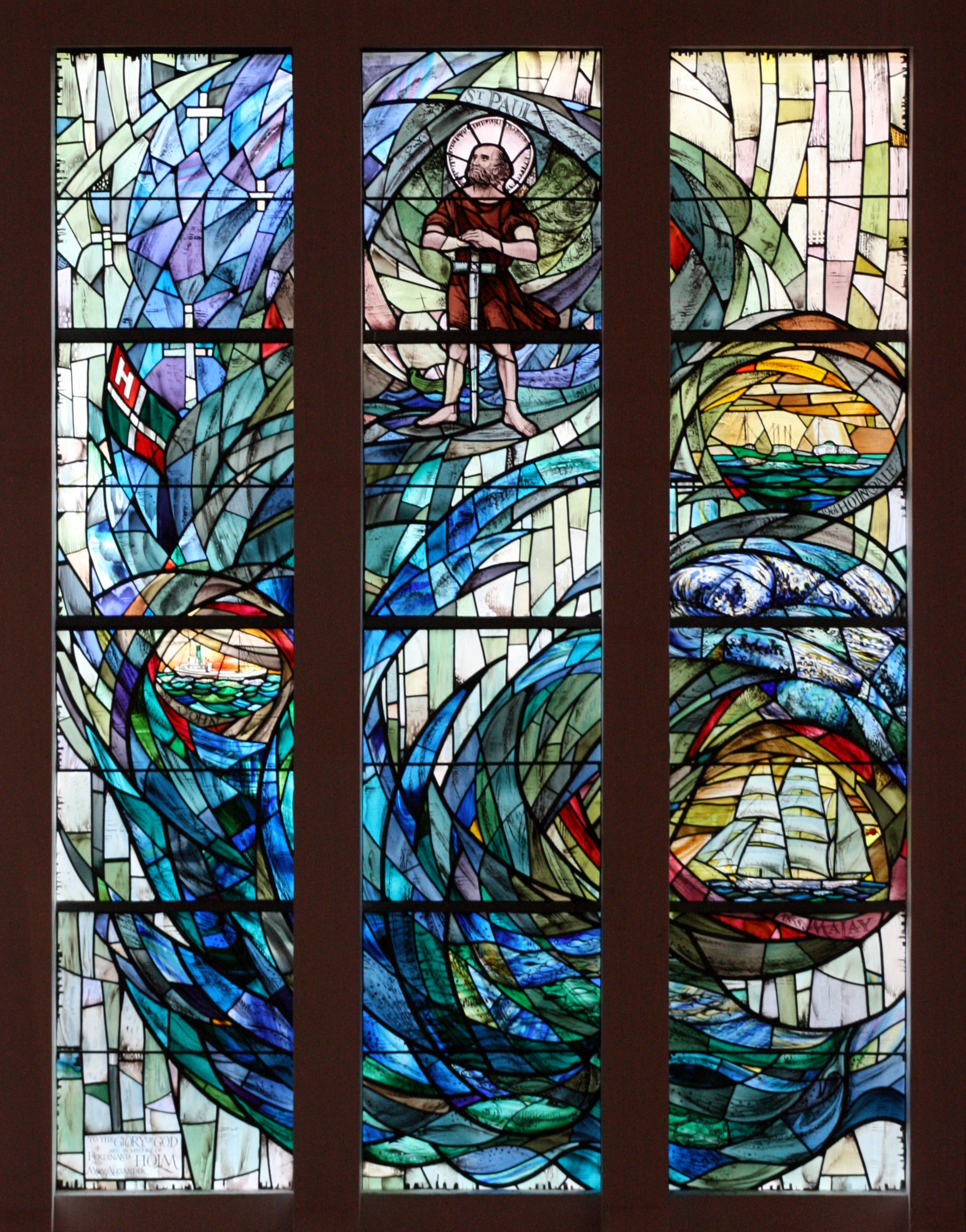
The Holm Window, installed 1970

Pehr Ferdinand Holm (3 April 1844–30 March 1917) was a New Zealand mariner and shipowner. He was born in Arboga, Sweden on 3 April 1844.

Holm and his wife are commemorated by a large window in the Wellington Cathedral of St Paul.

After his death his business was continued by his sons under the name Holm & Co.
