= MV Holmglen =

Coordinates: 44.5223°S 171.6894°E

MV Holmglen II was a steel-hull coastal trader built in 1956 by Maartenshoek, Netherlands-based shipyard Bodewes Scheepswerven for the Holm Shipping Company of New Zealand. It was 485 gross register tons, had a max speed of 9 knots (17 km/h; 10 mph) and was powered by a four-cylinder diesel engine.

On 23 November 1959, the ship left Dunedin, New Zealand, for Wanganui via Wellington, under the command of Captain Edward Joseph Eugene Regnaud. On the evening of 24 November, a mayday from Holmglen was received by the Taiaroa Head Signal and Radio Station, and a voice believed to be that of the captain reported, "am heeling heavily to port ... accommodation awash ... preparing to launch boat." The message was acknowledged by Taiaroa and answered by Holmglen, who said to stand by for further communication, but this was the last communication and she was not heard from again.

A sea and air search was conducted, and the wreck of Holmglen was found by another Holm Shipping Company vessel, MV Holmburn. After the crew of Holmburn spotted an oil slick, they used sonar to locate the exact position, which was later confirmed by the Royal New Zealand Navy underwater video and divers. Holmglen lies in 30 fathoms (180 ft; 55 m) of water about 22 miles (35 km) south-east of Timaru, and all 15 people died. An investigation by Maritime New Zealand was unable to determine the cause for the sinking.

On 10 November 2008, Blenheim dive master Kevin Bailey drowned while diving the wreck.
