= Union Company =

New Zealand shipping company

Union Steam Ship Company of New Zealand Limited
- House flag
- Industry: Shipping, freight and passenger services
- Founded: 1875
- Founder: James Mills
- Defunct: 2000
- Headquarters: Dunedin (1875–1921); Wellington, New Zealand

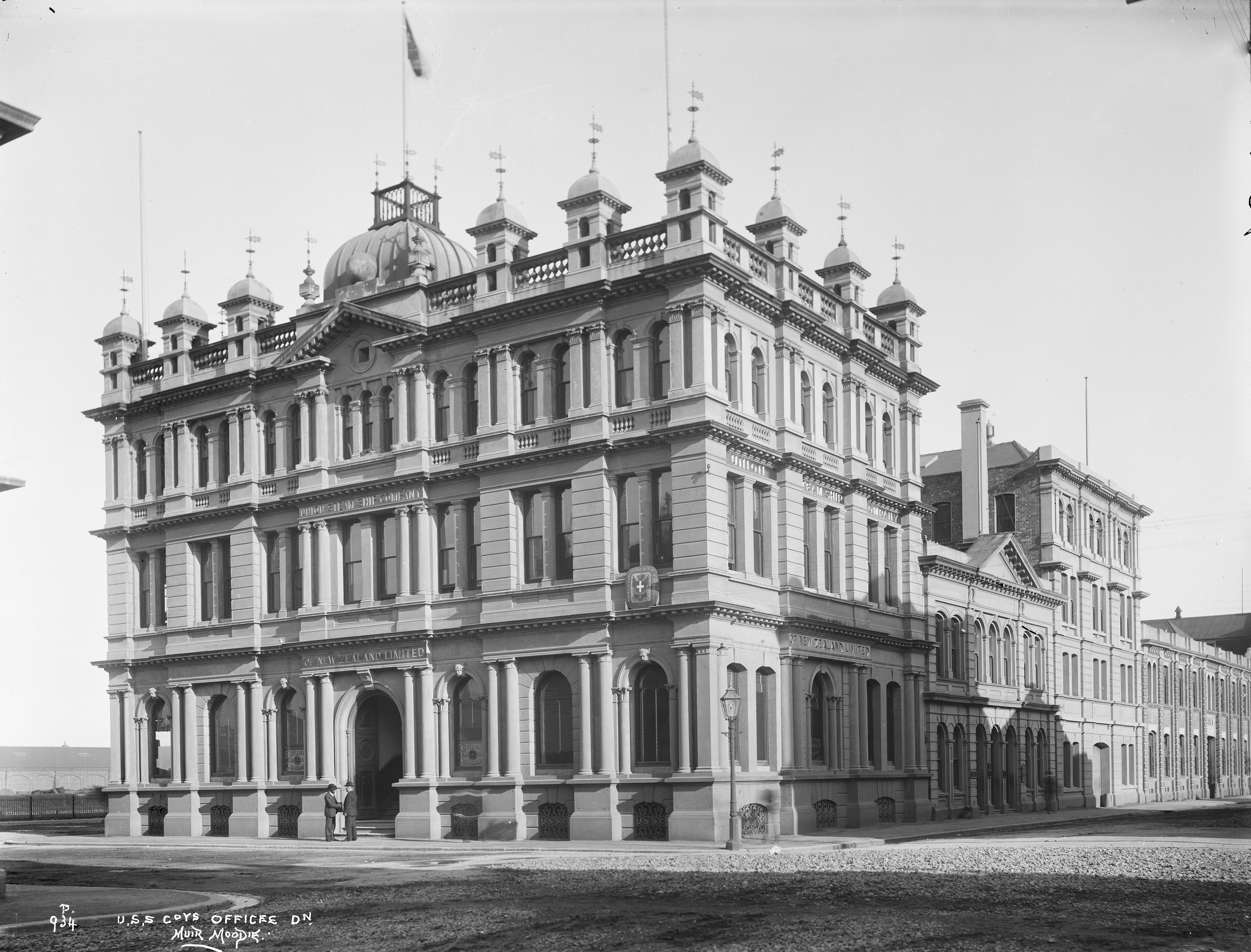
Head office, Water Street, Dunedin designed 1883

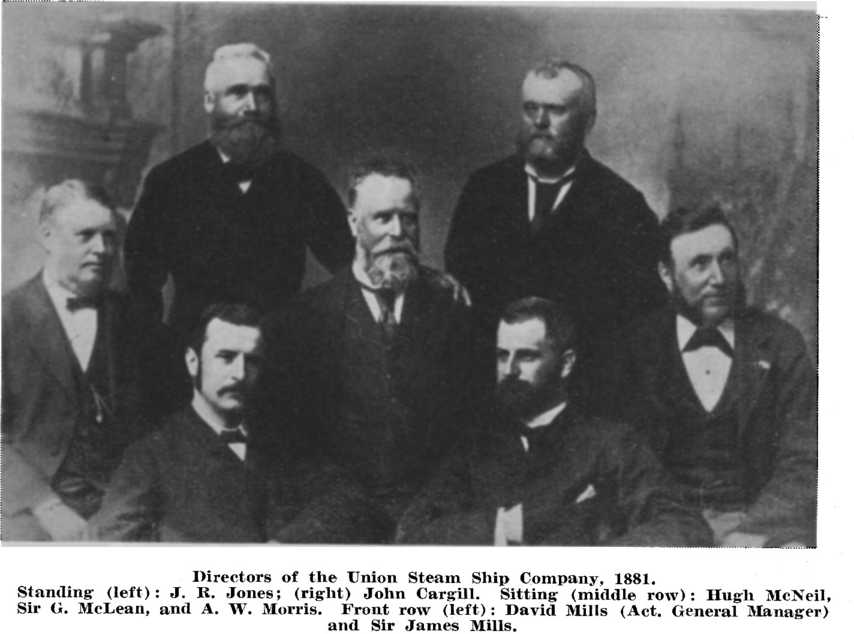
Five directors (back) of the Union Steam Ship Company in 1881, including John Richard Jones, John Cargill, and George McLean; David and James Mills in the foreground

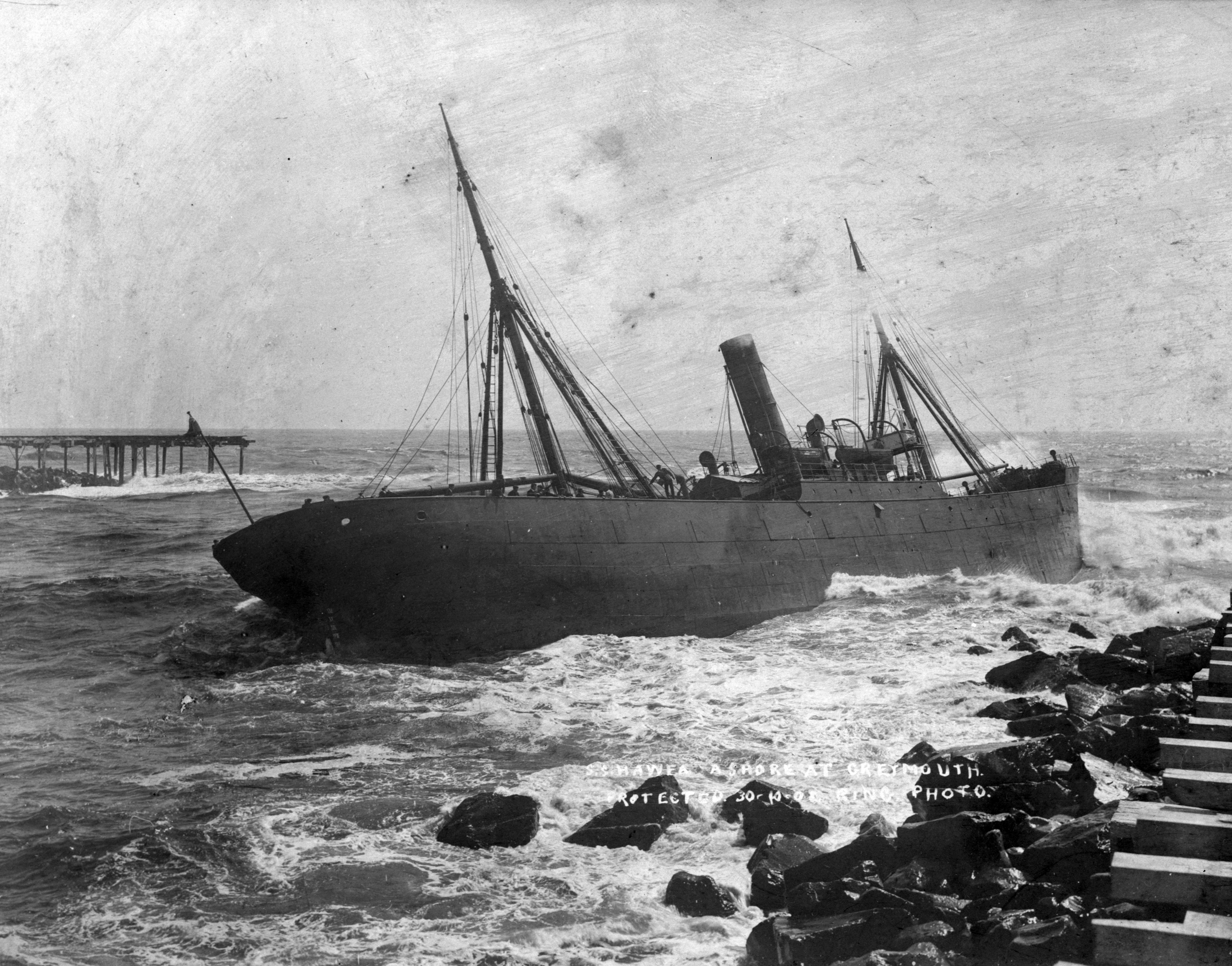
Hawea run ashore at the entrance to the Grey River, 1908

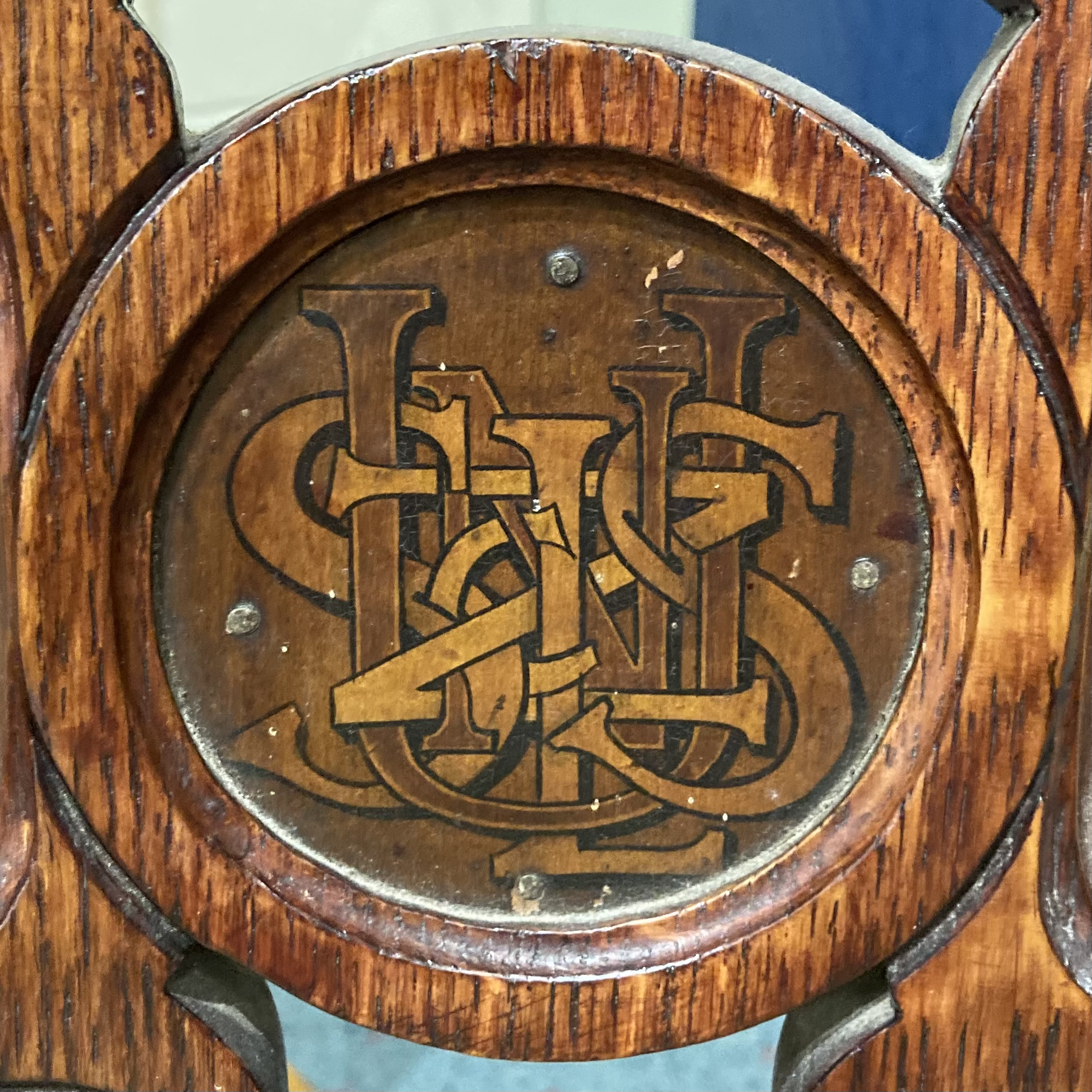
Logo and monogram of the Union Steam Ship Company of New Zealand

Union Steam Ship Company of New Zealand Limited was once the biggest shipping line in the Southern Hemisphere and New Zealand's largest private-sector employer. It was incorporated by James Mills in Dunedin in 1875 with the backing of a Scottish shipbuilder, Peter Denny. Bought by shipping giant P&O around the time of World War I it was sold in 1972 to an Australasian consortium and closed at the end of the twentieth century.

== James Mills ==
James Mills had worked for Johnny Jones and his Harbour Steam Company. After Jones’ death in 1869 Mills tried twice to float a Union Steam Ship Company of New Zealand Limited without attracting enough interest from local investors but in 1875 he found backing from Scottish shipbuilder Peter Denny in return for Union Steam Ship orders for Denny's Dumbarton shipyard. The Denny-built Hawea and Taupo, both then large by local standards, arrived in mid 1875 and entered service. Union Steam Ship took over the Harbour Steam Company's vessels on 1 July 1875.

=== Absorption of local competition ===
Union Steam Ship became a major shipping line dubbed "The Southern Octopus" with a near-monopoly on trans-Tasman shipping. It steadily mopped up trans-Tasman and coastal shipping businesses including -

- Anchor, Nelson 50% holding from 1908, absorbed into Union in 1972,
- Black Diamond Line, Wellington and Koranui coal mine in 1885,
- Canterbury Steam, 50% holding from 1905,
- Gisborne Sheepfarmers Frozen Meat & Mercantile Company 25% holding from 1912,
- Grey Valley Coal Company, Dunedin 1888,
- H.C. Sleigh Limited, Melbourne,
- Holm, a controlling shareholding from 1930,
- Invercargill Shipping Company, Dunedin 25% holding from 1907,
- Maoriland Steamship Company, Wellington 50% holding from 1915
- New Zealand Steam Ship Co from 24 June 1876, with their ships, Lady Bird, Phoebe, Taranaki and Wellington, for £47,400.
- Richardson & Co, Napier, a major shareholder, Williams & Kettle, sold shares to Union in 1912
- R.S.Lamb, Sydney holding from 1909, Union took over all the ships Gabriella, Kalingo, Omana and Ihumata (Kini) in 1930
- Wairau Steam Ship Company, Wellington 25% holding from 1907,
- Watchlin Shipping,
- Westport Coal Company, Dunedin 1887,
- William Holyman & Sons, Launceston 50% holding, involved in a Huddart Parker deal in 1902

=== Trans-Tasman ===
In 1878 McMeckan and Blackwood, who ran a weekly service between Melbourne and New Zealand, sold Albion, Arawata, Tararua and Ringarooma to Union. From 1889 there was three-way competition between Union Steam Ship, Huddart Parker and Tasmanian Steam Navigation Company (TSNCo) on the Tasmanian routes (Melbourne – Launceston, Hobart – Melbourne and Hobart – Sydney). TSNCo did not have other routes to absorb their Tasmanian losses and was bought out by USSCo in 1891. The rivalry between USSCo and Huddart Parker lasted to 1895 despite an earlier agreement in 1893. There was undercutting of fares and there were steamers shadowing each other from port to port. USSCo's Rotomahana and Mararoa would sail alongside the Miowra and Warrimoo, with other ships like the Te Anau and Manapouri sailing before and after and bracketing the Huddart Parker ships. The 1895 agreement between the two lines pooled the Auckland-Sydney profits and losses; the Melbourne-Launceston profits were divided 4/7 to USSCo and 3/7 to Huddart Parker. The Sydney-Hobart passenger trade was excluded but the cargo and stock trade was divided 2/3 to USSCo and 1/3 to Huddart Parker. Mark Twain criticised travel conditions on a Union Company ship in 1897 in his travel book Following the Equator.

Mills was a UK resident after 1907 and died in London in 1936. By 1914 Union Steam Ship had 75 ships. It was the biggest shipping line in the southern hemisphere and New Zealand's largest private-sector employer.

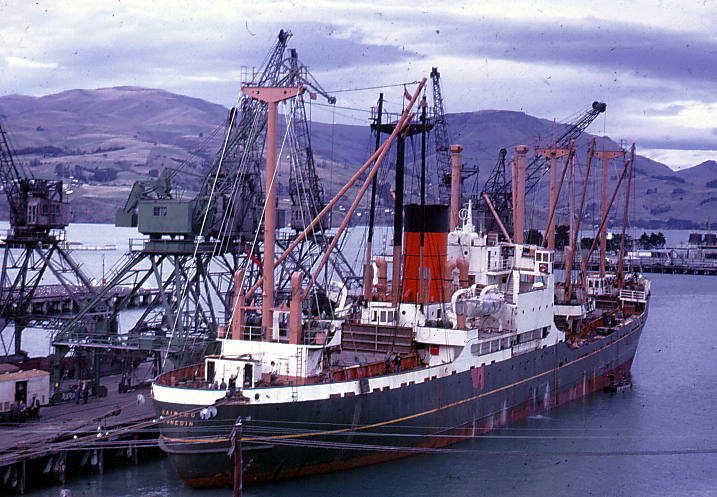
Union Steam Ship Company's 3,721 ton MV Kaimiro loading cargo in Lyttelton, New Zealand, in 1968

== P&O ==
In 1917 P&O shareholders were asked to confirm their directors' prior purchase of Union Steam Ship with the information that USSCo had a valuable coasting trade within New Zealand, connections with India and Australia and a line of steamers running between Australia, New Zealand and Canada. The Union Steam Ship fleet was described as 74 high class steamers with a tonnage of 237,860 and of an average age of 12 years. In November 1920, rumours surfaced that the head office of the company would shift from Dunedin to Wellington. At the end of 1920, it became known that the board of directors would remain in Dunedin, but that all headquarters staff would transfer to Wellington. The move happened in late 1921, with all head office functions in Wellington after the New Year holidays. About 70 staff transferred to Wellington, ending 46 years of Dunedin as the company's headquarters.

== Norrie Falla ==
With the Dunedin staff came Norrie Falla as general traffic manager. He had joined as a boy in Westport in 1898 and finished his accountancy exams in 1906. In 1910 he was put in charge of the cargoes and movements of Union's 65-strong fleet. Falla volunteered immediately for service in the 1914—1918 first world war. He was promoted to lieutenant colonel in 1916 and returned to his former post in 1919. He succeeded David Aiken as general manager in March 1934 and was appointed chairman in January 1936 on the death of founder Sir James Mills.

Falla ordered two new passenger ships and began a steady renewal of cargo ships commissioning 11 ships between 1935 and 1939.

Falla also took Union Company into airlines. First in 1934 into East Coast Airways and then Cook Strait Airways in 1935.

=== Australian National Airways ANA ===
Union in conjunction with Holyman's Airways and Huddart Parker set up an airline across Bass Strait which began business in September 1934. In 1935 they added Adelaide Steamship Company as a partner in the venture which was renamed Australian National Airways the following year.

Union took up a 20% interest on the formation of Australian National Airways in 1936.

=== Union Airways NAC ===
In 1935 Union Airways of New Zealand was formed by Union Steam Ship and it built an air service through New Zealand. Union Airways was nationalised by the government in 1947 and renamed National Airways Corporation. Union Travel remained a substantial operation as travel agents and tour operators.

=== Tasman Empire Airways TEAL Air New Zealand ===
Union was instrumental in establishing this business in particular by buying the first three flying boats which began operations in April 1940. TEAL became Air New Zealand.

=== Falla dies ===
During World War II, Falla returned to the army with the rank of brigadier. He was later based in London as New Zealand representative on the Ministry of War Transport. He joined the main board of P&O in 1944. On his way back to New Zealand aged 62 he suffered a cerebral haemorrhage and died at sea 6 November 1945.

== P&O sell to TNT ==
Australian road transport business, Thomas Nationwide Transport, had a substantial road transport stake in New Zealand. With New Zealand investors TNT bought USSCo from P&O in 1971.

In 1990 Union Steam Ship operated seven ships, and was involved in ship management, tourism, real estate and other ventures. By 2000, the Union Bulk barge made its last voyage.

== Brierley Investments ==
At the end of the 20th century Brierley Investments bought all the shares, broke Union Steam Ship into components and sold up what it could.

Union Steam Ship Company of New Zealand owned more than 350 ships and has been the subject of a number of books.

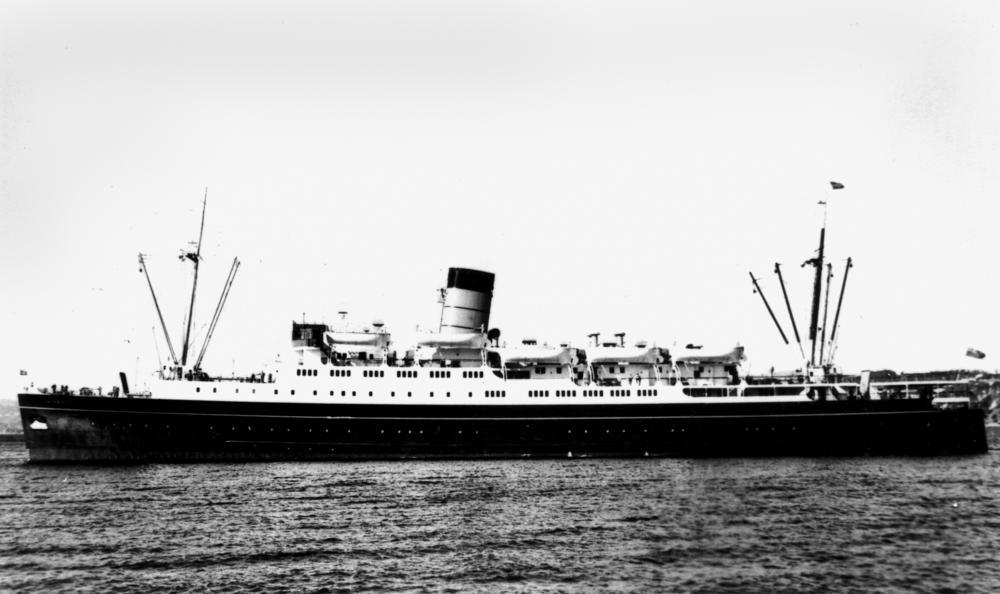
Steamer Express TEV Hinemoa, built in England in 1946 and scrapped in Hong Kong in 1971

== Ferries ==
=== Steamer Express Wellington to Lyttelton ===
Union Steam Ship began regular sailings between Wellington and Lyttelton in 1895 with the Penguin making two round trips a week. In 1905 this became a daily service year round. In 1933 the name "Steamer Express" was adopted for the service. Over the years a number of ships were used, including two Maoris, two Wahines, two Rangatiras, and a Hinemoa.

TEV Wahine entered service in October 1966 and foundered and sank at the mouth of Wellington Harbour 18 months later in April 1968. The TEV Rangatira entered service in 1972 and was withdrawn in 1976, bringing the Wellington–Lyttelton "Steamer Express" to an end.

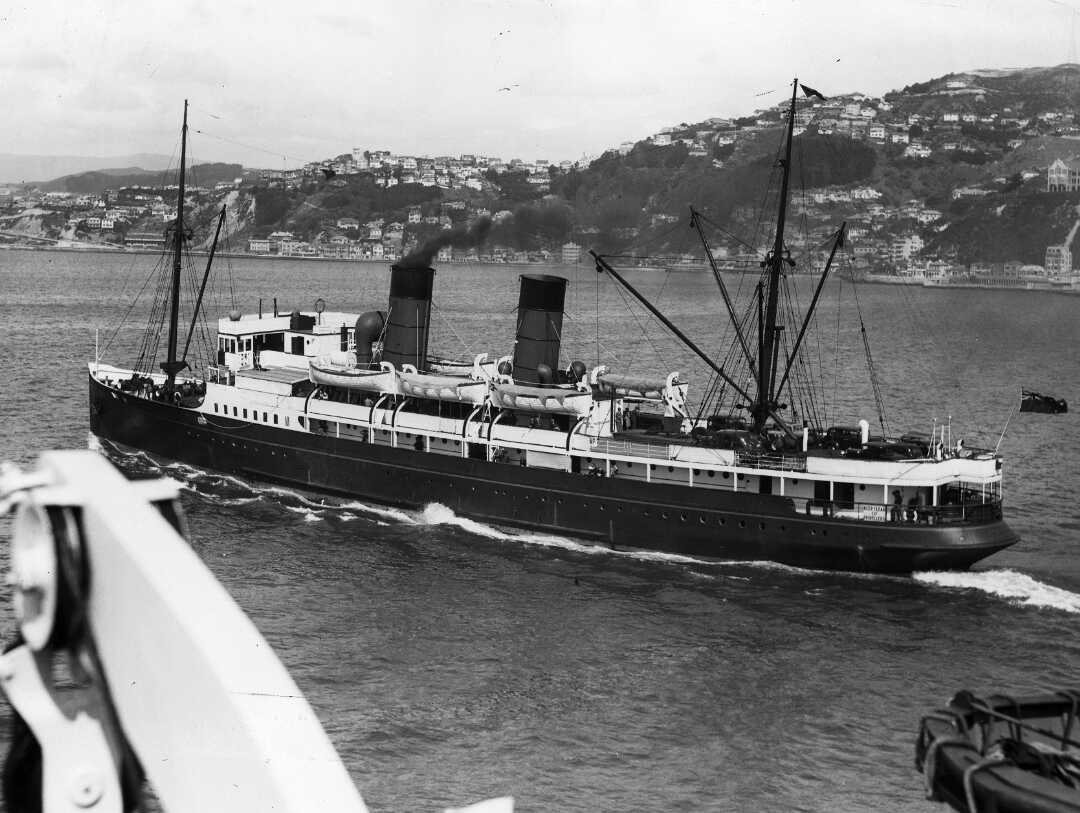
Tamahine, built in 1925 and retired in 1962

=== Wellington to Picton ===
In what has been described as "a fatal mistake", the Union Steam Ship announced in 1956 that the Tamahine was to be withdrawn from the Wellington-Picton route in 1962 and unlikely to be replaced (despite an offer of a $3 million government loan). The designer of the replacement ferry the GMV Aramoana recalled that, "The media said the whole thing was a red herring", adding, "In their view, if the Union Steam Ship Company couldn't make the service pay, Railways definitely couldn't."

== Fleet ==
Name	Built	In service	Gross tonnage	Notes
SS Aorangi (1883)	1883	1883–1915	4,163 GT	Sunk 10 August 1915 at Scapa Flow
MV Aorangi (1924)	1924	1924–1953	17,491 GT	Arrived 25 July 1953 at Clydeside for breaking up
SS Aotearoa	1915	1915	15,300 GT	sunk 1917 as HMS Avenger
TSS Arahura	1905	1905–1926	1,607 GT	
SS Atua	1906	1906–1926	3,444 GT	Built by David J Dunlop. Sold to Khedivial Mail in 1926.
HMT Awatea	1936	1936–1942	13,482 GT	Trans Tasman liner, sunk in 1942, as HMT Awatea
Dartford	1877	1908–1921	1,327 GT	Dartford was a 67 m (221.5 ft) long, iron barque, built by Mountsey & Foster, South Dock, Sunderland. In March 1908 Union bought her as a cadet ship for 12 cadets at Lyttelton, increased to 36 in 1911. She was converted to a coal hulk in 1914. In 1917, she was converted back to a barque, due to wartime shipping shortages, but again laid up in Auckland Harbour as a hulk in 1921. She was broken up and then beached in Boulder Bay on Rangitoto Island on 25 July 1946.
SS Dingadee	1883	1890–1900	640 GT	Collier built by Royal Victoria Dock, bought from Australasian Steam, sold to Blackball Coal Co.; purchased by Chobei Tanaka of Tokyo in 1905, renamed Chokyumaru No.3, and operated for nearly twenty years before being resold; scrapped in 1925.
SS Flinders	1878	1891–1900	640 GT	Built by A & J Inglis for TSNCo, which merged in 1891, sold to McIlwraith, McEacharn and in 1907 to Adelaide Steamship, hulked in 1911 after fire damage and beached on 4 September 1931 at Garden Island Ships Graveyard, where she remains.
Gladbrook	1877	1911–1945	1,112 GT	An iron, coal hulk, 214.4 ft (65.3 m) x 35.2 ft (10.7 m) x 21.2 ft (6.5 m), launched on 26 April 1877 at R & J Evans yard, Liverpool as County of Anglesea for W Thomas & Co, Liverpool, 1905 sold to O Pettersen and V Gustafson, Mariehamn. 1911 bought by Union, converted to a hulk, able to hold 2,000 tons of coal, and renamed Gladbrook. In 1918 she was re-rigged as a barque at Port Chalmers, due to postwar shipping shortages, and sailed to San Francisco, but in 1921 was hulked again for use at Suva, in 1924 moved to Auckland, stripped and, on 19 December 1945, beached on Rangitoto Island. She was replaced as a hulk by Helen Denny.
SS Hawea	1875	1875–1888	721	Launched 17 February 1875 and completed 1 April 1875 by William Denny & Bros, Dumbarton for Union. Hawea, a sister ship of Taupo, was an iron, single-screw, 2-masted steamer, 215.7 ft (65.7 m) x 27.3 ft (8.3 m) x 14.1 ft (4.3 m), with a 2-cylinder, 160 nhp engine, driving her at up to 11 kn (20 km/h; 13 mph). In 1875 she was the first Union ship to visit Picton, later being used on the Lyttelton-Wellington-Picton-Nelson-New Plymouth-Onehunga service. On 30 March 1886 she ran aground off Nelson, but was refloated on the next day's tide. She was wrecked on 12 June 1888 near New Plymouth. The wreck was removed by dredging in 1925.
SS Hawea	1897	1897–1908	1,758 GT	A steel, single-screw steamer launched on 20 November 1896 for Union by Archibald McMillan & Son, Dumbarton, 260 ft (79 m) x 36.1 ft (11.0 m) x 22.8 ft (6.9 m), with a 3-cylinder (17, 28, 45 1/2 x 42 in), 134 hp (100 kW) engine by Denny & Co. On 30 October 1908, as she left Greymouth, she probably hit the bottom in heavy waves on the bar and was wrecked on the north breakwater. Her remains were blown up in March 1909.
MV Hauraki	1921	1921–1942	7,112 GT	Captured on 12 July 1942 by Imperial Japanese navy off the coast of Sri Lanka. IJN renamed it Hoki Maru and used the vessel until sunk in Operation Hailstone in Truk Lagoon
SS Hauroto	1882	1882–1915	1,988 GT	A steel, single-screw steamer launnched on 31 August 1882 for Union by William Denny & Bros, 284.8 ft (86.8 m) x 36.3 ft (11.1 m) x 22.6 ft (6.9 m), with a 2-cylinder (38 & 68 - 45in), 250 hp (190 kW) compound engine. On 1 January 1889 she damaged King Arthur in Hobsons Bay. In 1915 she was sold to Carmichael & Clarke, Hong Kong and in 1917 to a related company, Hauroto SS Co. Ltd. She left Saigon on 26 July 1919, but never reached Hong Kong and was posted missing in a typhoon. Some wreckage was found near the Paracels.
Helen Denny	1866	1934–1948	734 GT	An iron, sailing ship, 187.5 ft (57.2 m) x 31.2 ft (9.5 m) x 19.1 ft (5.8 m), launched on 8 November 1866 by Robert Duncan & Co, for Albion Shipping for the UK-Burma run, but by 1872 was running between Port Glasgow and Auckland. In 1874 she was reduced from full rigging to a barque and in 1882 Albion merged to form Shaw, Savill & Albion Line. In 1896 she was sold to Ferdinand Holm, Wellington and in 1913 to Paparoa Coal Co as a coal hulk. In 1934 Waimarino towed her from Wellington to Lyttelton. In 1946 she was towed to Auckland. On 27 April 1848 she was scuttled off Cuvier Island, being the last of Auckland's coal hulks.
TEV Hinemoa	1946	1947–1967	6,911 GT	The steamer was 419.3 ft (127.8 m) x 58.2 ft (17.7 m) x 24.7 ft (7.5 m), launched on 30 May 1946 (tenders had been sought in 1939) by Vickers-Armstrong Ltd for Union's Wellington-Lyttelton Inter-island express, serving the railway pier at Lyttelton. Her 2 steam turbines powered 13,000 hp (9,700 kW) British Thomson-Houston electric motors and twin screws, at up to 22 kn (41 km/h; 25 mph), with up to 82 cars and 921 passengers. After fitting out at Birkenhead, she went to Greenock, left there on 21 December 1946, with 90 passengers and arrived at Wellington on 26 January 1947. Her first trip to Lyttelton was on 10 February, replacing Wahine. Cabins were charged for by position, rather than the ship being divided into 1st and 2nd class sections. A rough crossing was reported a week after her maiden voyage and in 1950 a gale damaged her bridge, broke several saloon windows and she was again 8 hours late. She was replaced by Wahine from 23 August 1966, as she could not be readily converted to a ro-ro ferry. She was laid up at Wellington. In October 1966, though US President Lyndon Johnson stayed at Government House, she was used as a hotel ship for journalists. On 23 August 1967 she was sold to Hydro Tasmania for power and accommodation at Bell Bay and renamed George H Evans. Rain soon ended the drought and in 1969 she was sold to Hamersley Ore for power at Dampier. After a new power station opened, she was moored offshore. During Cyclone Glynis, in January 1970, she broke her moorings. On 12 February 1971 Fuji Marden & Co Ltd, Hong Kong, bought her and she was towed in March by the tug Salvonia and scrapped.
SS Katoa	1912	1912–1933	2,484 GT	Collier built by Osbourne, Graham & Co Ltd, Sunderland. Sold to Moller & Co, Shanghai (as Winifred Moller) in 1933, to Zui Kong Steamship Co Ltd, Shanghai (as Tsze Yung) in 1946, to Chinese Maritime Trust Ltd. in 1948 and broken up in Taiwan in 1958.
SS Korowai	1938	1938–1965	2,525 GT	Cargo steamer, launched on 2 May 1938, completed June 1938 by Alexander Stephen for Union, 303.8 ft (92.6 m) x 45.2 ft (13.8 m) x 19.6 ft (6.0 m), 1 screw, triple-expansion (21.5, 34 & 56 - 39)in, 200 psi (1,400 kPa), 353 hp (263 kW), 12 kn (22 km/h; 14 mph), 7.02.1941 stranded at Greymouth, 18 August 1944 on fire off Tokomaru Bay, 1965 sold to Timor Navigation Corp S.A., Panama - Lay San Ing, Dili, renamed Ermera, 21 November 1969 arrived at Mollers Ltd., Hong Kong, for scrapping in March 1970.
SS Maheno	1905	1905–1935	5,323 GT	
SS Maori	1868	1875–1902	174 GT	Schooner rigged steamer by Blackwood & Gordon. In 1913 she sank in Saluafata Harbour.
TSS Maori	1906	1907–1946	3,399 GT	
TEV Maori	1952	1953–1972	8,303 GT	Converted to Ro-Ro configuration in 1965
SS Marama	1907	1907–1937	6,437 GT	
SS Makura	1908	1908–1937	8,075 GT	Arrived 8 April 1937 at Shanghai for breaking up
SS Manapouri	1882	1882–1915	1,783 GT	First to have electric lights Sunk 1945.
TSS Maunganui	1911	1911–1957	7,527 GT	Sold 1948 as SS Cyrenia; arrived 1957 at Savona for breaking up
SS Monowai	1890	1890–1926	3,433	Launched 11 December 1889 and completed 4 April 1890 by William Denny & Bros, Dumbarton for Union. Monowai was a steel, single-screw, 2-masted steamer, 330 ft (100 m) x 42.2 ft (12.9 m) x 34 ft (10 m), with a 3-cylinder, 330 nhp engine, driving her at up to 13 kn (24 km/h; 15 mph). In 1926 she was stripped to a hulk at Port Chalmers and sold to Gisborne Harbour Board, who scuttled her as a breakwater on 16 December 1926.
SS Monowai	1925	1925–1960	10,852 GT	Ex-SS Razmak (1925–1930); sold 1960 in Hong Kong for breaking up
SS Ohau	1885	1885–1899	411 GT	She and sister ship, Taupo, were built by William Denny & Brothers. The Ohau arrived on 14 January 1885 and Taupo on 10 March 1885. Ohau sank whilst carrying timber and coal. She was supposed foundered in a heavy gale. Last seen off Cape Campbell on 12 May 1899. Some wreckage was found near Castlepoint. Lost with all 22 crew. An inquiry into the loss dismissed claims that the ship was too low in the water. A council-published heritage trail says locals still find coal on the shore near Cape Campbell, likely from the Ohau.
SS Penguin	1864	1879–1909	874 GT	Sunk 12 February 1909 off Cape Terawhiti; 75 deaths
TEV Rangatira	1930	1931–1965	6,152 GT	
TEV Rangatira	1971	1972–1976	9,387 GT	
SS Rotoiti	1898	1898–1912		Rotoiti was built for Union's Onehunga-New Plymouth service, as a 220 ft (67 m) long, 33.1 ft (10.1 m) wide, 13.2 ft (4.0 m) deep, steel steamer, with two 3-cylinder (13 1/2, 20 1/2, 31 1/2 x 27 in) engines of 108 hp (81 kW), driving twin screws. In 1912 she was sold to Northern Steamship and renamed Manaia. On 10 June 1926 she was wrecked on Slipper Island (Whakahau), without loss of life.
SS Rotomahana	1879	1879–1921	1,727 GT	The name was used by at least two other ships of the era. The first mild steel ship in the Union fleet. Built by William Denny & Brothers. Scrapped in 1926.
SS Southern Cross	1873	1881–1906	262 GT	Launched 5 November 1873 by J T Eltringham (at Stone Quay, South Shields) for Watts Bros, Napier, a schooner-rigged, iron, single-screw steamer, 135.2 ft (41.2 m) x 23.7 ft (7.2 m) x 9 ft (2.7 m), with a 2-cylinder (18.5 & 36 × 24 in), 50 hp (37 kW) engine by Pattison & Atkinson, Newcastle driving her at up to 8.5 kn (15.7 km/h; 9.8 mph). In 1878 she was sold to Auckland Steam Ship Co Ltd and in 1881 to Union for £8,500. In 1897, to comply with local subsidy law, Union sent a staff member, Fred Cramond, to be their agent in Papeete and the ship was renamed Croix De Sud. On return in 1901 she was hulked, her machinery being put into the newly launched Gael in 1904. On 24 April 1906 Duchess towed her to be scuttled in Cook Strait.
RMS Tahiti	1904	1904–1930	5,323 GT	Ex-RMS Port Kingston (1904–1911); sunk 12 August 1930 off Rarotonga; no death
SS Talune	1890	1891–1925	2,087	Launched 19 April 1890 at Leith and sold to Union in 1891, Talune was a steel, single-screw, 2-masted steamer, 280 ft (85 m) x 38.2 ft (11.6 m) x 13.5 ft (4.1 m), with a 3-cylinder, 259 nhp engine. In 1923 she was cleaned, but, in May 1925, was sold for dismantling by Todd & Borlase at Dunedin and on 22 January 1926 was sunk as part of a breakwater at Waikokopu.
SS Tararua	1864	1864–1881	563 GT	Sunk 29 April 1881 off Waipapa Point; 131 deaths
SS Taupo	1875	1875–1881	720	Launched 20 March 1875 by William Denny & Bros, Dumbarton for Union. Taupo, a sister ship of Hawea, was a single-screw, 2-masted steamer, 215.8 ft (65.8 m) x 27.3 ft (8.3 m) x 14.1 ft (4.3 m), with a 2-cylinder engine. On 1 February 1879 she ran aground at the entrance to Tauranga Harbour, but was refloated on the 2 March 1881. She was wrecked on 29 April 1881 off Mayor Island after seams opened, while under tow to Auckland.
SS Te Anau	1879	1880–1924	1,652	Launched 3 November 1879 and completed on 15 December 1879 by William Denny & Bros, Dumbarton for Union, Te Anau was a steel, single-screw steamer, 270 ft (82 m) x 34.2 ft (10.4 m) x 22.5 ft (6.9 m), with a 2-cylinder, 200 hp engine. In June 1924 she was sold to Todd & Borlase, Dunedin, partly dismantled at Port Chalmers and towed to Whanganui to be scuttled as a breakwater on 23 August 1924.
MV Union Nelson	1980	1981–1991	3,023 GT	Built by Dong Hae Shipbuilding, Ulsan, as Sunny Karina, able to carry 150 standard containers, 96.37 m (316.2 ft) x 16.08 m (52.8 ft) x 8.41 m (27.6 ft), draft 6.581 m (21.59 ft), 1981 acquired from Aquarius, Hamburg and renamed Union Nelson, She replaced Anchor's last ship, Titoki, in March 1982, serving Lyttelton, Nelson, New Plymouth and Onehunga, until being withdrawn after 3 years, in December 1985, due to competition from rail ferries. In 1986 she was sold to Polynesian Triangle Line, Tonga, and renamed Capricornia. She was sold in 1991 renamed Polynesian Link and capsized alongside wharf at Suva on 12 October 1991. In 1992 she was cut up where she lay.
TSS Wahine	1912	1913–1951	4,436 GT	Ran aground on the Masela Island Reef off Cape Palsu in the Arafura Sea
TEV Wahine	1966	1966–1968	8,948 GT	Sunk 10 April 1968 after hitting Barrett Reef during an extra-tropical cyclone; 53 deaths.
SS Waihemo	1903	1914–1918	4,286 GT	Cargo steamer, built by Northumberland Shipbuilding as Canada Cape, sunk by a mine in March 1918
SS Waihora	1882	1882–1903	2,003 GT	
SS Waihora	1907	1907–1927	4,638 GT	
SS Wainui	1886	1887–1927	684	Launched 2 September 1886 and completed the next month by Murray Bros, Dumbarton, for Union. Wainui was a steel, single-screw steamer, 196 ft (60 m) x 28.2 ft (8.6 m) x 14.7 ft (4.5 m), with a 2-cylinder, 95 hp (71 kW) engine, built by Muir & Houston Ltd, Glasgow. From 1906 to 1908 she ran the first Wellington- Picton ferries. From 1924 she ran between Auckland and Gisborne, until being laid up in June 1927, after the passenger service was ended and she was replaced by Waimea. On 14 October 1929 Borlase & McKay, after stripping her at Auckland, scuttled her, as part of a breakwater at Whangaparāoa, for Mr Shakespear.
SS Waipori	1901	1901-1928	1,976 GT	Later renamed Tung Lee in 1937. Scuttled in Yangtse River at Zhenjiang in 1937 as blockship by Chinese Government during Japanese attacks.
SS Wairarapa	1882	1882–1894	1,786 GT	Sunk 29 October 1894 off Great Barrier Island; 140 deaths
SS Warrimoo	1901	1901–1914	3,326 GT	
SS Waitemata	1908	1908–1918	5,432 GT	Sunk 14 July 1918 in the Mediterranean
SS Waitemata	1919	1919–1932	5,666 GT	Launched as War Rampart 4 March 1919 by Northumberland Shipbuilding Company Ltd at Howden for the Shipping Controller. Following sea trials, Union took her over from 23 May 1919 and renamed her Waitemata, 400 ft (120 m) x 53 ft (16 m) x 32.8 ft (10.0 m), with a 483 hp (360 kW), or 619 hp (462 kW) triple-expansion (27, 45 & 75 × 54 in) engine by North East Marine Engine Works, driving a single screw at up to 11 or 12 kn (22 km/h; 14 mph). She was used for trade in the Pacific and to Australia, until she was laid up in Hobson Bay on 25 August 1930 at Auckland, due to lack of trade. In November 1932 she was sold to William Crosby & Co Pty Ltd, Melbourne, and was to be renamed Willandra. However, she was repaired by Mason Brothers in Auckland, sold to Yamashita Shipping Company to ship scrap iron to Japan in February 1933 and renamed Yuki Maru. On 16 June 1944 she was sunk by USS Bream off Morotai Island, in the Sumba Strait.
SS Waitomo	1944	1946-1963	7209	Built in Vancouver in 1944 for the Canadian Park Steamship Company under the name Sunnyside Park, renamed Waitomo after having been sold to Union Steam Ship Company. During service with Union Steam Ship Company manned by Canadian seamen and New Zealand/Australian officers.
SS Wellington	1863	1864–1881	429	Launched 24 October 1863 by Blackwood & Gordon, Port Glasgow, for New Zealand Steam Navigation Co, Wellington and transferred to Union in 1871. Wellington was a 100-passenger, iron, single-screw steamer, 185.5 ft (56.5 m) x 24.6 ft (7.5 m) x 13.2 ft (4.0 m), with a 2-cylinder, 90 hp (67 kW) engine, which arrived on 3 June 1864. In 1881 she was sold to Northern Steamship, initially serving Tauranga-Auckland. She ran daily to Whangārei in 1900, but was laid up about 1905, after being used on the New Plymouth-Onehunga route. 1909 G. T. Niccol converted her to a hulk at Auckland. 1913 scuttled as a breakwater at Moehau, or at Whangārei.
SS Whangape (1900)	1900	1900–1928	2,931 GT	Sister ship to SS Mont-Blanc (1899)
SS Willochra	1913	1913–1914	7,784 GT	Union chartered her from Adelaide Steamship in April 1913, just after she had arrived in Sydney from her builders, William Beardmore, to replace Warrimoo on the Dunedin-Lyttelton-Wellington-Sydney route. In September 1913 she was put on the San Francisco service, until converted to a troopship in late 1914.

== Arms ==
Coat of arms of Union Company

Notes
Granted 16 October 1940.
Crest
On a wreath of the colours a Demi-Lion rampant Or langued Gules holding in his paws a standard with the house flag of the Company Gules having a small Union Jack in the centre surrounded by the letters U.S.S.Co.
Escutcheon
Azure on a chevron Argent two chevronels Gules and Sable in chief a double Vol displayed of the second, and in base a Lymphad proper with sails set and flagged of the third on barry wavy of six of the first and second.
Supporters
On either side a carved Maori Panel Murrey representing Tangaroa the Maori Guardian Sea-God of Te Moana-nui-a-Kiwa (the Pacific Ocean).
Motto
Per Mare Per Caelum

== See also ==
- Union Airways of New Zealand – Union Line's airline subsidiary

== Bibliography ==
- Farquhar, Ian (2001). Union Fleet. Wellington: New Zealand Ship & Marine Society. ISBN 0959783474.
- McGregor, Rae (2009). Sailing to Success: The Union Company Cadet Scheme. Wellington: New Zealand Ship & Marine Society on behalf of Union Company Cadets Reunion Committee. ISBN 9780473152178.
- McLean, Gavin (2001). Captain's Log: New Zealand's Maritime History (Softcover). Auckland, NZ: Hodder Moa Books. ISBN 1-86958-881-9.
- McLean, Gavin (1989). Ships of the Union Company. Wellington, NZ: GP Government Print. ISBN 0-477-00016-9.
- McLean, Gavin (1990). The Southern Octopus. Wellington, NZ: New Zealand Ship and Marine Society & Wellington Maritime Museum. ISBN 0959783431.
- McLauchlan, Gordon (1987). The Line that Dared: A history of the Union Steam Ship Company 1875–1975. Auckland: Four Star Books. ISBN 0-9597853-0-2.
