= Waikōkopu =

- Location within North Island
- Coordinates: 39.0729°S 177.825°E
- Country: New Zealand
- Region: Hawke's Bay
- Territorial authority: Wairoa District

Waikōkopu is a small coastal settlement in the north of New Zealand's Hawke's Bay Region, where the Waikōkopu Stream forms a small tidal estuary between two prominent headlands. The name Waikōkopu translates from Māori as "waters" (wai) of the "kokopu" , the kokopu being any one of three species of small native fresh-water fish. Waikokopu is about 40 km east of Wairoa, the largest town in northern Hawke's Bay.

The settlement has history as both a landing place for Māori, and an industrial port town. Today, Waikōkopu has only a few houses, and little evidence of its industrial past is visible. The wharf has been reduced to rubble by southerly swells, and only a few boats use the small harbour. The remains of the wharf and breakwater are still there, and are probably now best known as an access point for the Rolling Stones surf break on the southern headland.

== History ==
=== Early history ===
In Māori times Waikōkopu was a landing place for waka (canoes) and the site of Māori settlements. By 1832 (8 years before the signing of the Treaty of Waitangi) it was the site of the first coastal whaling station in northern Hawke's Bay, run by an American named Ward. Other whaling stations were established in the same general area, and the whales were soon depleted as an economic resource. By 1876 wool was being loaded out from Waikōkopu to ships waiting offshore. By 1910 volumes had increased to the point where a port company was formed to improve facilities for the loading out of farm produce. Mr EB Bendall was appointed Harbour master.

Wairoa's river harbour was difficult to access and had a dangerous bar. This prohibited its use by ships of any size, and prevented full exploitation of the region's economic potential. As Waikōkopu offered the best port development potential in the region, Parliament in 1915 authorised a private railway from Wairoa to Waikōkopu. Apart from a preliminary survey nothing was done about this line during the war years, or for two years thereafter because of the possible establishment of a rail link from Wairoa to Gisborne via an inland route.

By 1920 the Wairoa River harbour was virtually unusable because of silting of the bar at the river mouth. Due to the urgency of the situation, the lack of progress on the inland railway route, and the business community's inability to raise the necessary capital, the Government agreed to build the line to Waikōkopu.

=== Rail development ===
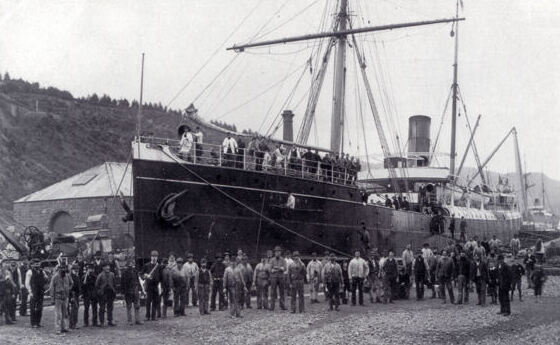
The ship Talune was sunk to form a breakwater.

Despite some difficulties during the building of the line, and the need to flatten a small hill at Waikōkopu to create a flat area for the rail yards, the first through train from Wairoa to Waikōkopu ran on 17 July 1923. From 1921 to 1923 the Government had expended £352,790 on the project. However the port company had failed in its attempts to create an inner harbour at Waikōkopu, and the Government had to authorise expenditure of a further £78,000 for 'the immediate erection of safe berthing facilities'. The work was speedily completed, and the first of many shipments of frozen meat went out via the new railway line and port in August 1924.

During further development of the port in 1925 the ship Talune was stripped, filled with rocks and sunk to form a breakwater to protect the wharf from the Southerly swells. The Talune was notorious as the ship on which the 1918 pandemic influenza reached Samoa, killing over 20% of the population.

From 1929 and through the 1930s heavy equipment and iron work for the Waikaremoana power project was brought ashore at Waikōkopu, railed to Wairoa, and then carted up to the lake by bullock wagon and traction engines. Also in the 1930s, during the building of the Napier to Wairoa section of the Palmerston North - Gisborne Line, the steelwork for the Mohaka Viaduct was landed at the port and railed to the Mohaka River work site.

In 1924, an engineer's report recommended the branch be incorporated as the southernmost portion of a new coastal rail route from Wairoa to Gisborne. The originally proposed inland rail route from Wairoa to Gisborne was abandoned, and by 1942 the Wairoa - Waikōkopu section was incorporated into the Palmerston North - Gisborne line. Easy transport to Gisborne and Napier via rail gave Wairoa access to superior port facilities, and Waikōkopu reverted to a small fishing establishment and a base for servicing the lighthouse on Portland Island, off the south end of the Māhia Peninsula, until the light was automated in 1984.

=== Shipwrecks ===
Two ships are recorded as having been wrecked at Waikōkopu, in 1886 and 1900.

In September 1886, the wreck of the schooner Cleopatra was found bottom up on the beach at Waikōkopu, where it rapidly broke up. The schooner had been bound from Thames to Lyttelton with a cargo of timber. It was supposed the schooner was capsized at sea during a heavy gale with the loss of all six crew members. The Cleopatra was of 92 tons, 82 feet long, and had been built in Auckland in 1867.

In November 1900, the cutter Coralie encountered a strong south-westerly wind and ran for shelter at Waikōkopu during a voyage from Gisborne to Napier. The next day the wind shifted to the south, blowing 'with terrific force'. Both anchors were let go and for a while the cutter rode safely, but as there was no sign of the sea abating the three crew decided to get ashore as soon as possible. After a perilous trip in the dinghy the crew landed safely, but after a short time the storm increased and their ship was driven ashore where the surf quickly broke it up. The Coralie was 47 feet long, of 29 tons register, and had been built in 1874.
