= SS Waihora (1882) =

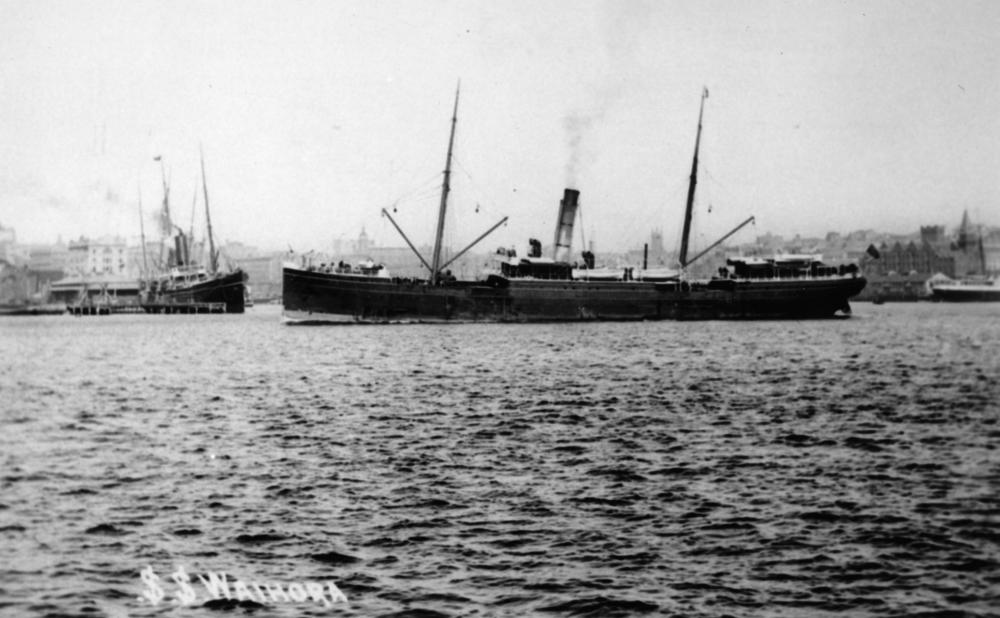
- SS Waihora

History
- Name: Waihora (1882-1906); Lysholt (1906-1911)
- Owner: Union Steam Ship Company of New Zealand (1882-1903); Koe Guan Company (1903-1906); Diedrichsen & Jebsen & Company; H. Diedrichsen (1909-1911)
- Builder: William Denny & Brothers, Dumbarton
- Yard number: 264
- Launched: 25 November 1882
- Fate: Scrapped in 1911

General characteristics
- Tonnage: 2,003 GRT; 1,269 NT
- Length: 285 ft (87 m)
- Beam: 36.2 ft (11.0 m)
- Propulsion: Steam compound engine

SS Waihora was a 2,003-ton passenger cargo steamship built by William Denny & Brothers, Dumbarton in 1882 for the Union Steam Ship Company of New Zealand.

Waihora stuck a rock of the coast of Tasmania in February 1886 and was holed. She was sold subsequently to Koe Guan Company, Penang in 1903, to Diedrichsen & Jebsen & Company, Hamburg in 1906 and renamed Lysholt and later to H. Diedrichsen, Hamburg in 1909.

== Fate ==
She was broken up at Shanghai in 1911.
