= SS Penguin =

19th and 20th-century New Zealand ferry

Coordinates: 41.35°S 174.66°E

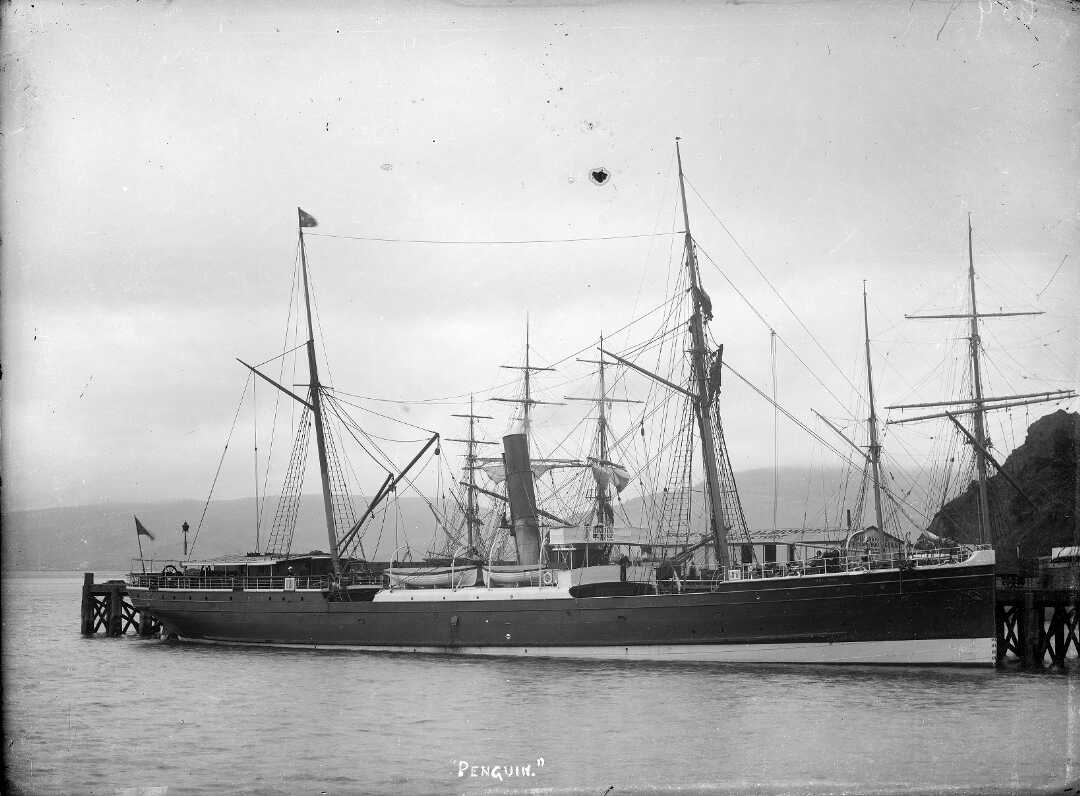
- SS Penguin at Port Chalmers. Photograph by David Alexander De Maus.

History

New Zealand
- Name: SS Penguin
- Owner: G. & J. Burns, Glasgow, Scotland (1864–1879); Union Steamship Company, Dunedin, New Zealand (1879–1909)
- Builder: Tod and Macgregor, Glasgow
- Yard number: 128
- Launched: 21 January 1864
- Identification: Official number: 47849
- Fate: Sank on 12 February 1909 after colliding with rocks near Wellington. 75 people killed.

General characteristics
- Type: Passenger/cargo steamship
- Tonnage: As built; 749 GRT; 518 NRT; From 1882; 874 GRT; 517 NRT
- Length: 220 ft 6 in (67.21 m)
- Beam: 28 ft 6 in (8.69 m)
- Depth: 14 ft 4 in (4.37 m)
- Propulsion: As built; Tod & Macgregor 2-cylinder inverted steam engine; From 1882; Robert Napier and Sons 180 hp (134 kW) 2-cylinder compound steam engine
- Speed: As built; 10 knots (19 km/h; 12 mph); From 1882; 12 knots (22 km/h; 14 mph)

SS Penguin was a New Zealand inter-island ferry steamer that sank off the southwest coast of Wellington after striking a rock near Sinclair Head in poor weather on 12 February 1909. Penguin's sinking caused the deaths of 75 people, leaving only 30 survivors. This was New Zealand's worst maritime disaster of the 20th century.

== Ship history ==
Penguin was built by Tod & McGregor of Glasgow, Scotland, for G. & J. Burns of Glasgow, and launched on 21 January 1864. Registered in Glasgow on 4 April 1864, she was finally sold to the Union Steamship Company in 1879, and was extensively refitted in 1882.

In 1904, a passenger aboard the SS Penguin tried to shoot a dolphin named Pelorus Jack with a rifle, leading to Jack becoming the first individual sea creature protected by law in any country.

=== Sinking ===
Penguin departed Picton on 12 February 1909 en route to Wellington in good conditions. However, the weather conditions changed by 8 pm, with very strong winds and bad visibility. At 10 pm, Captain Francis Naylor headed farther out to sea to wait for a break in the weather, but the ship smashed into Thoms Rock while making the turn, and water started to pour in. Women and children were loaded into the lifeboats, but the rough seas dragged the lifeboats underwater; only one woman survived, and all the children were killed. Other survivors drifted for hours on rafts before reaching safety. As the Penguin sank, seawater flooded the engine room. The cold water reached the boilers, and a massive steam explosion violently fractured the ship.

Following the disaster, a half-day holiday was declared in Wellington to allow the many funerals to be held, as some 40 people were laid to rest in Karori Cemetery.

A court of inquiry found that the ship struck Thoms Rock near the mouth to Karori Stream in Cook Strait. The captain maintained that it had struck the submerged hull of the Rio Loge, lost the month before. On the 100th anniversary of the sinking, Wellington's mayor unveiled a plaque at Tongue Point, near the site of the wreck.
