= SS Waihora (1907) =

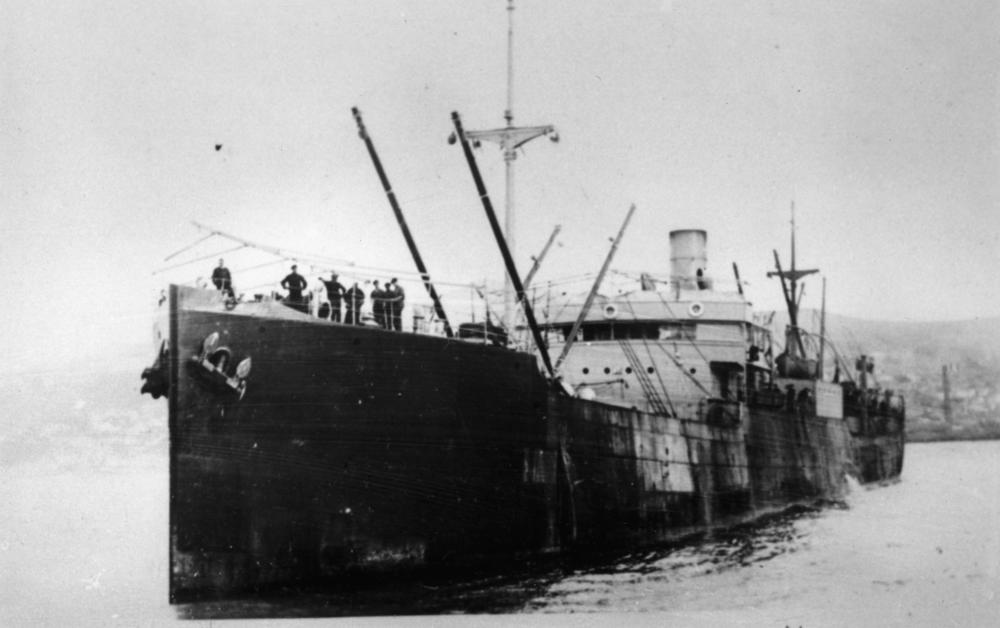
- Waihora

History
- Name: Waihora (1907–1927); Tairyu Maru (1927–1944)
- Owner: Union Steam Ship Company of New Zealand
- Builder: Swan Hunter & Wigham Richardson, Tyne
- Launched: 15 April 1907
- Fate: Sunk after being bombed by aircraft on 19 February 1944

General characteristics
- Tonnage: 4,638 GRT
- Length: 384.1 ft (117.1 m)
- Beam: 51.5 ft (15.7 m)
- Draught: 29.2 ft (8.9 m)
- Propulsion: Triple expansion engine
- Speed: 10.5 knots (19.4 km/h; 12.1 mph)

SS Waihora was a 4,638-ton cargo steamship built by Swan Hunter & Wigham Richardson, Tyne in 1907 for the Union Steam Ship Company of New Zealand. During the First World War she was chartered by the Royal Australian Navy and took part in operations against the German colonies in the Pacific with the Australian Naval and Military Expeditionary Force and later used by New Zealand as a troop transport as His Majesty’s New Zealand Transport. She was sold in 1927 to Naigai Kisen and renamed Tairyu Maru.

== Fate ==
Tairyu Maru was bombed by United States aircraft on 19 February 1944 during the Second World War and was sunk.
