= SS Talune =

Passenger and freight steamer 1890–1925

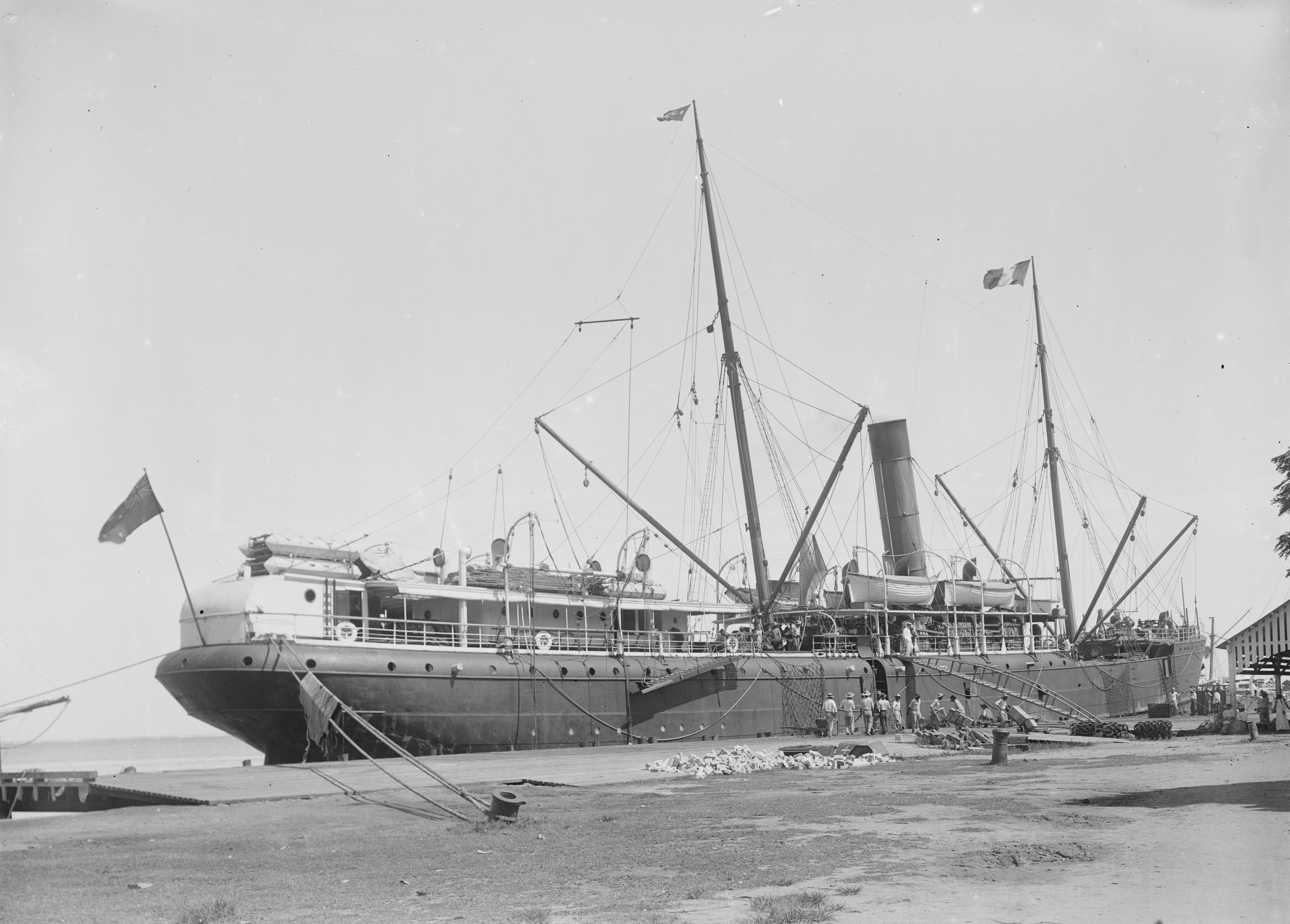
- SS Talune at Papeete, Tahiti in 1910

History
- Name: SS Talune
- Operator: Tasmanian Steam Navigation Company / (1891 on) Union Steam Ship Company of New Zealand
- Builder: Ramage & Ferguson, of Leith, Scotland
- Launched: 19 April 1890
- In service: 1890
- Out of service: 1921
- Fate: Scuttled November 1925 at Miramar, Wellington, New Zealand

General characteristics
- Tonnage: 2,087 GRT
- Propulsion: Single triple-expansion steam engine
- Capacity: 175 passengers
- Crew: 56 crew

SS Talune was built in 1890 and scuttled in 1925. She was a passenger and freight steamship employed in the Tasman Sea and South Seas trades in the last decade of the 19th century and the first two decades of the 20th century. It was a typical ship of its time and type in every way. It would be unknown except that it was the ship that brought the deadly 1918 Spanish flu pandemic from New Zealand to Samoa and other Pacific islands.

== History ==
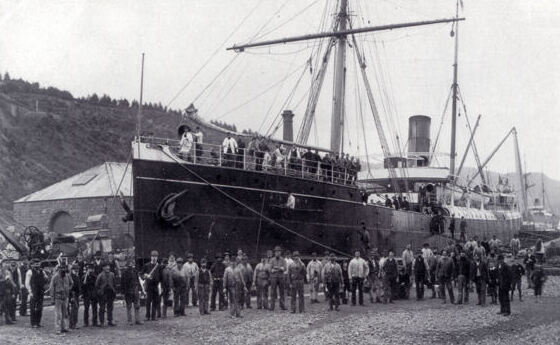
SS Talune in Port Chalmers graving dock, c. 1890s

SS (steamship) Talune was built by Ramage & Ferguson, of Leith, Scotland, for the Tasmanian Steam Navigation Company of Hobart, Tasmania, entering service with the company in 1890. It was of 2,087 tons, about 230 feet long, coal fired, and powered by a triple-expansion steam engine. It had passenger accommodation for up to 175 people and a crew of around 56. Initially the Talune was employed on the Hobart-Sydney run for its parent company.

In 1891, the ship was taken over by the Union Steam Ship Company of New Zealand when it absorbed the Tasmanian company and its assets. The Talune worked thereafter between New Zealand and Australia, and later between New Zealand and the Pacific Islands.

== Early service ==
No complete record of the Talune's many voyages has been found, but the ship appears in a number of records from the time. In November 1891, the Talune took the British poet and writer Rudyard Kipling from Wellington to Bluff, and then on to Melbourne as part of a world tour. His opinion of the ship is not recorded. New Zealand poll tax records show that in May 1896 it brought one Ah Lun, a 34-year-old Cantonese man to Wellington from Sydney. In June 1897, it carried Carl Hertz from Bluff to Hobart. Hertz was an American "Illusionist and Prestigidator" who was the most successful early exhibitor to show motion pictures in New Zealand. In 1901, the Talune was the setting for a lethal poisoning reported in the Otago Witness in April.

In its early years, the Talune was involved in two recorded salvage operations. In 1898, it rendered assistance to the SS Ruapehu, stranded on Farewell Spit. In 1899 the Talune fell in with the 5,500-ton Perthshire, which had gone missing on a voyage from Sydney to Wellington. For eight weeks, the Perthshire had been drifting helplessly without power in the Tasman Sea with a broken tailshaft. The Talune towed the larger ship back to Sydney.

== First World War service ==
The Talune saw service in the First World War as His Majesty's New Zealand Transport 16 (HMNZT 16) transporting at least one contingent of troops to Western Samoa. At some time after 1916, the Talune reverted to civilian service and resumed its ordinary voyages.

== Stranding ==
Talune's only known stranding occurred on 12 March 1917, in the Egeria Channel, off Nukuʻalofa. The Talune was carrying general cargo and 15 passengers, so by this time may have already reverted to civilian service after serving as a military transport. There was £400 worth of damage done to plates and frames. The Court of Enquiry found the Talune struck an uncharted pinnacle rock, and there is no record of the Master (J. Morrison) being censured.

== Influenza in the Pacific ==
On 7 November 1918, the Talune arrived at Apia in Western Samoa, on one of its regular Pacific voyages from Auckland, New Zealand, successively calling at ports in Fiji, Samoa, Tonga, Nauru, and then Fiji again before returning to Auckland.

At that time the Western Samoan islands were administered by New Zealand, which had seized them from Germany at the start of the First World War in 1914. The United States of America controlled the Eastern islands.

At the time of the Talune's departure from Auckland, pandemic influenza was spreading rapidly in New Zealand, resulting in many fatalities. Before leaving Auckland two crewmen had reported sick and were sent ashore, but by the time Talune reached Suva in Fiji on 4 November several more crewmen had influenza.

As none of the local passengers was stricken, they were allowed ashore and the cargo unloaded while the ship remained in quarantine alongside the wharf, the Port Health officer having heard reports of the severe epidemic in New Zealand. As was the custom of the time, about 90 Fijian labourers were taken on board to work the cargo as the ship proceeded on its planned voyage. By the time the Talune reached Apia in Samoa on 7 November, most of the Fijian labourers were ill.

The ship's quarantine at Suva was apparently not mentioned on arrival in Apia and the acting Port Health officer at Apia was not aware of the epidemic in Auckland. After what seems to have been a somewhat cursory examination the ship was granted pratique and passengers allowed to disembark. "[The] Talune's captain told the medical officer, Doctor Atkinson, that nothing was serious, but that "'One old reverend told me he had been sick back in Auckland, but he seems fine now. Two Samoan kids, Tau and Faleolo, had headaches yesterday but are up and around again today.'" The doctor "questioned the pastor and two boys as they went by", but no one complained of being ill. Two hours later the yellow flag was lowered. The Talune had a clean bill of health."

By 31 December, at least 7,542 Samoan people had died from the virulent influenza, and deaths from influenza continued into 1919. A commission of enquiry calculated a final death toll of about 8,500, about 22% of the whole population of Western Samoa. While the impact of the pandemic was undoubtedly amplified by the Samoan cultural response to illness, which requires the fono (family) to gather around a sick person, the New Zealand administrative response to the pandemic was certainly at least inept. Much more could have been done to reduce the impact on the population, such as prohibiting travel within and between islands.

The original decision to allow the Talune's passengers to land, along with other events during New Zealand's administration of Samoa, was the subject of an apology from the New Zealand Government delivered at a state luncheon in Apia in June 2002.

The impact on Western Samoa was particularly poignant in view of the success of the American authorities in preventing pandemic influenza from gaining a foothold in islands under their administration (even though these were only about 60 kilometres (37 mi) from the New Zealand-administered islands. Without orders from his government (but based on what he learned from a radio news service) the governor of American Samoa, Navy Commander John M. Poyer, instituted a rigorous quarantine policy. When he heard of the outbreak on Western Samoa, he banned travel to or from the neighbouring islands. Poyer persuaded the island's natives to mount a shore patrol to prevent illegal landings. People who disembarked from ships sailing from the American mainland were kept under house arrest for a specified period or examined daily. Aspects of the quarantine continued into mid-1920, a year after Poyer departed to the sound of a 17-gun salute. There were no influenza deaths on American Samoa.

The Talune went on from Apia to Tonga (calling at Neiafu, Vava'u, Ha'Apai) and to Nuku'Alofa in Tongatapu, where it arrived on 12 November 1918. Within a few days of the Talune's arrival, the disease had spread with heavy loss of life; estimates vary between 1,800 and 2,000 died, or about 8% to 10% of the Tongan population. After Tongatapu the Talune sailed for Nauru, where once again the first cases of influenza appeared ashore within a few days of her departure.

== Disposal ==
Nothing is known of Talune's employment after its disastrous 1918 voyage until 1921, when Union Steamship Company records show it was laid up.

In 1925 the ship was hulked, and in November of that year was filled with rocks and scuttled to form the foundation of a breakwater at Waikokopu, a small port in northern Hawke Bay, on the east coast of the North Island of New Zealand.

== Remains ==
The port of Waikokopu is no longer in use, and the wharf and the breakwater have been reduced to rubble by southerly swells. The foundations of the breakwater where the last vestiges of the Talune lie can be seen on Google Earth at 39°04′23.74″S 177°49′44.25″E.

== Bibliography ==
- Cliff, A.; Hagget, P.; Smallman-Raynor, M. (2000). Island epidemics. Oxford University Press. ISBN 0-19-828895-6.
- Rice, G. (2005). Black November – the 1918 influenza pandemic in New Zealand (2 ed.). Christchurch, New Zealand: Canterbury University Press. ISBN 1-877257-35-4.
- Plowman, Peter (2004). Ferry to Tasmania, A Short History. Rosenberg Publishing Pty, Limited. ISBN 1-877058-27-0.
