= List of disasters in New Zealand by death toll =

This is a list of New Zealand disasters by death toll, listing major peacetime disasters which occurred in New Zealand and its territories or involved a significant number of New Zealand citizens, in a specific incident, where the loss of life was 10 or more.

== 100 or more deaths ==
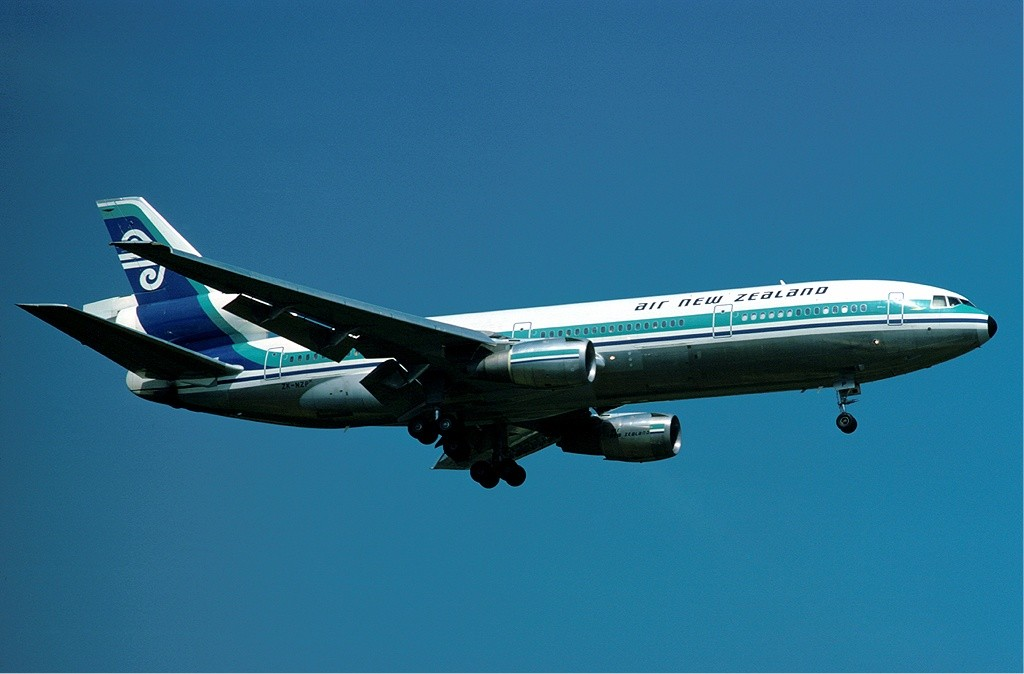
Air New Zealand Flight 901 in 1979

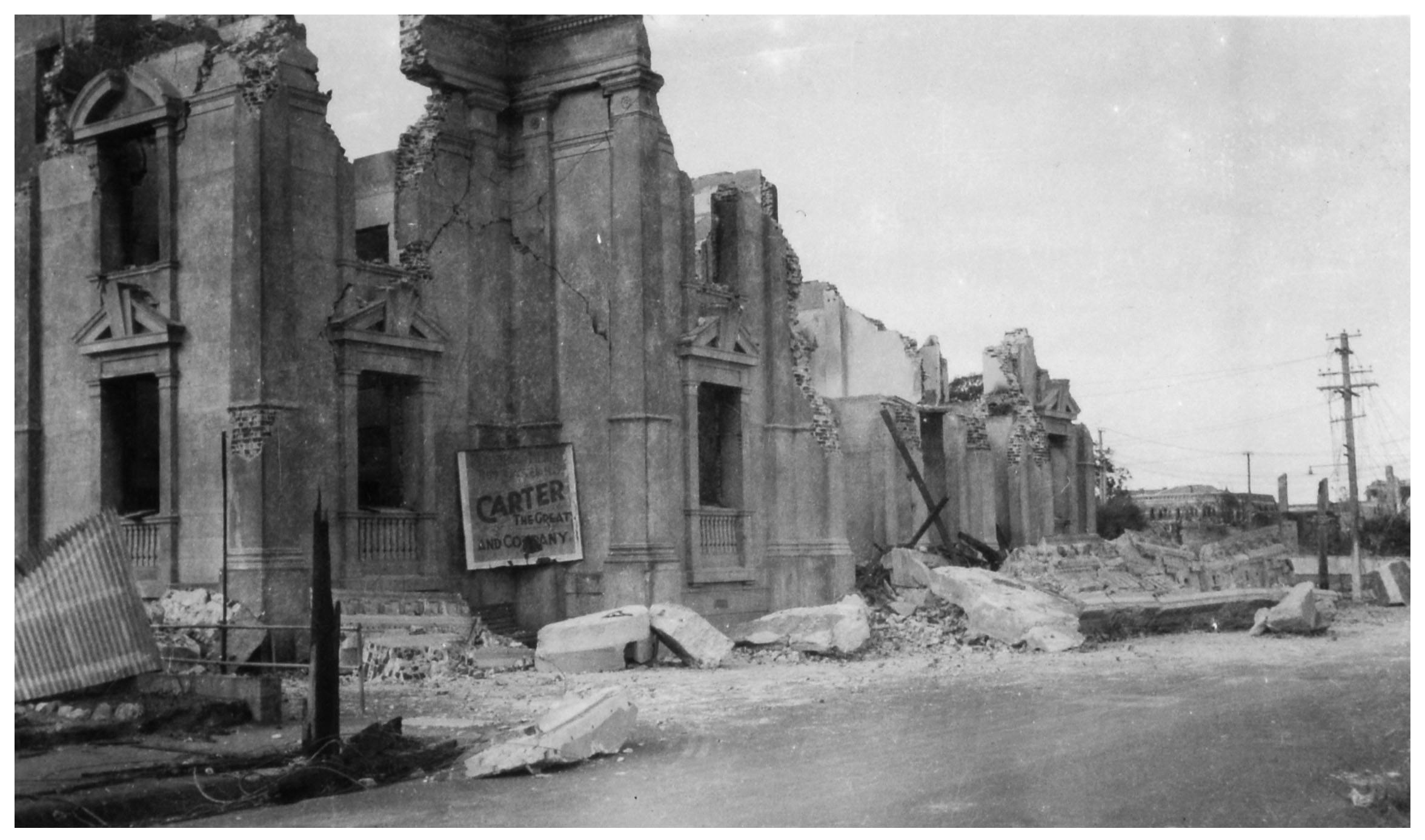
Napier Town Hall following the earthquake

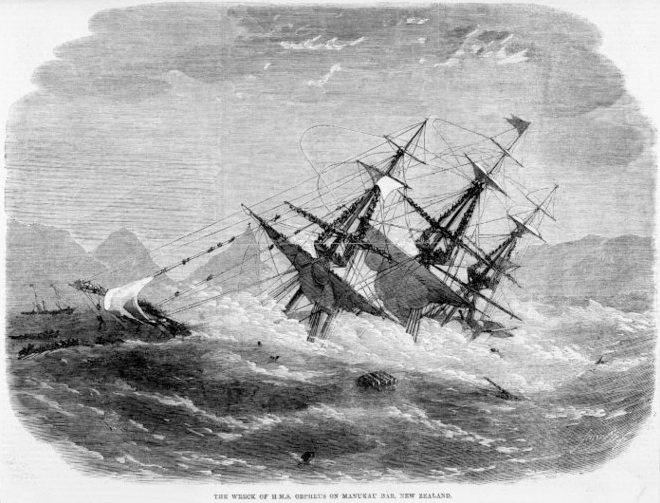
Illustration of the HMS Orpheus wreck

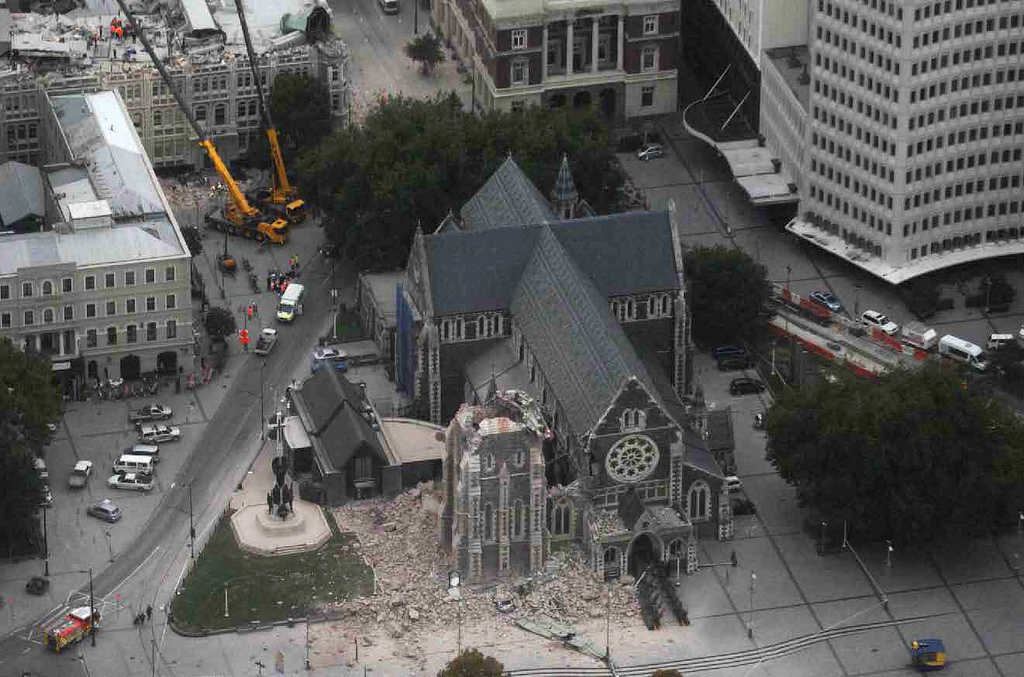
Christchurch Cathedral following the earthquake

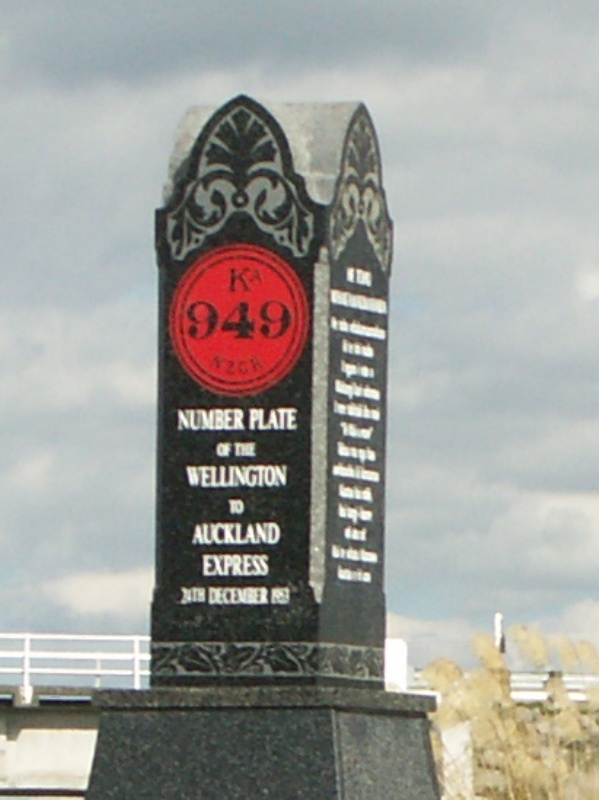
Tangiwai memorial plaque

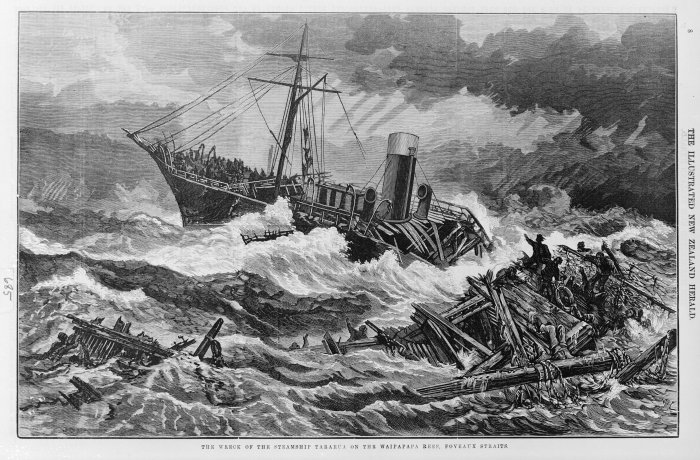
Illustration of the SS Tararua wreck

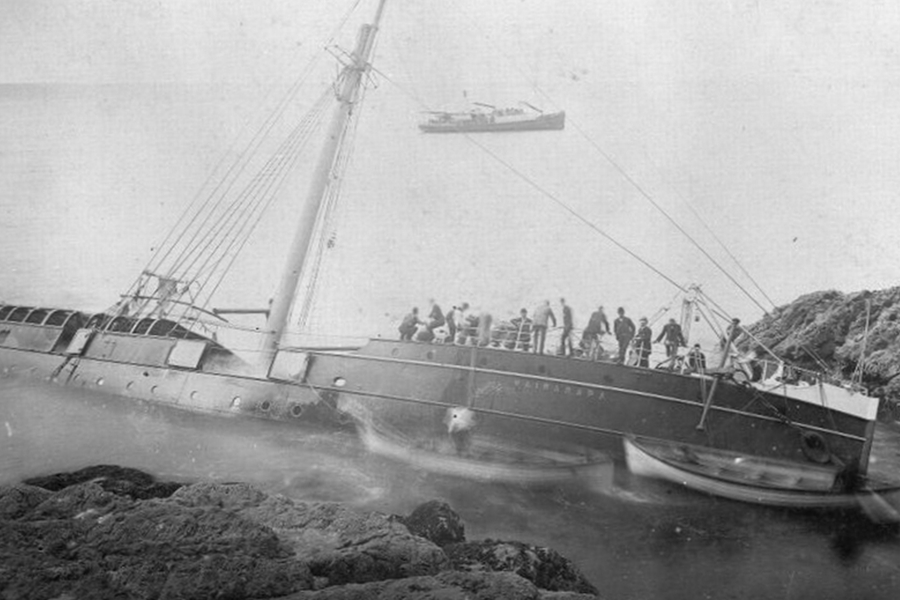
SS Wairarapa wreck

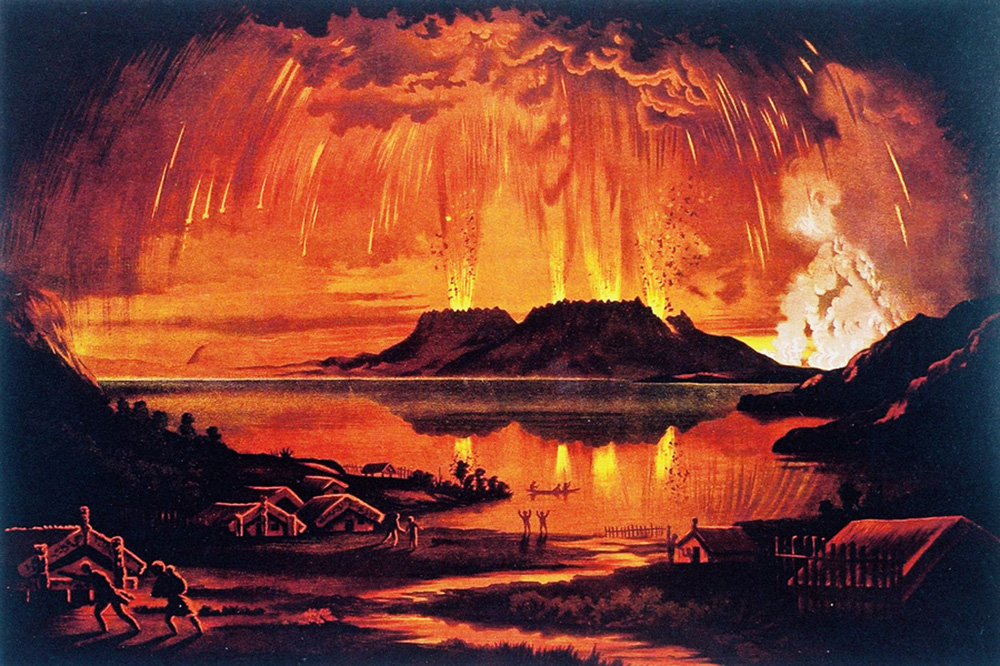
Illustration of the Mount Tarawera eruption

Deaths	Name	Type	Date	Location	Notes
257	Air New Zealand Flight 901	Air accident	28 November 1979	Mount Erebus, Ross Island, Antarctica	Controlled flight into terrain
256	1931 Hawke's Bay earthquake	Earthquake	3 February 1931	20 km north of Napier	
200+	1820s Southland tsunami	Tsunami	1820s	Orepuki beach	Possibly more than 200 killed
189	HMS Orpheus	Shipwreck	7 February 1863	Off Manukau Heads, near Auckland	
185	2011 Christchurch earthquake	Earthquake	22 February 2011	Christchurch	
151	Tangiwai disaster	Railway derailment due to a lahar damaging a bridge	24 December 1953	Whangaehu River	
135+	1st Little Waihi landslide	Landslide	1780	Waihi Village	
131	SS Tararua	Shipwreck	29 April 1881	Off Waipapa Point	
121	SS Wairarapa	Shipwreck	29 October 1894	Off Great Barrier Island	
108–153	1886 eruption of Mount Tarawera	Volcanic eruption	10 June 1886	Mount Tarawera	

== 50 to 99 deaths ==
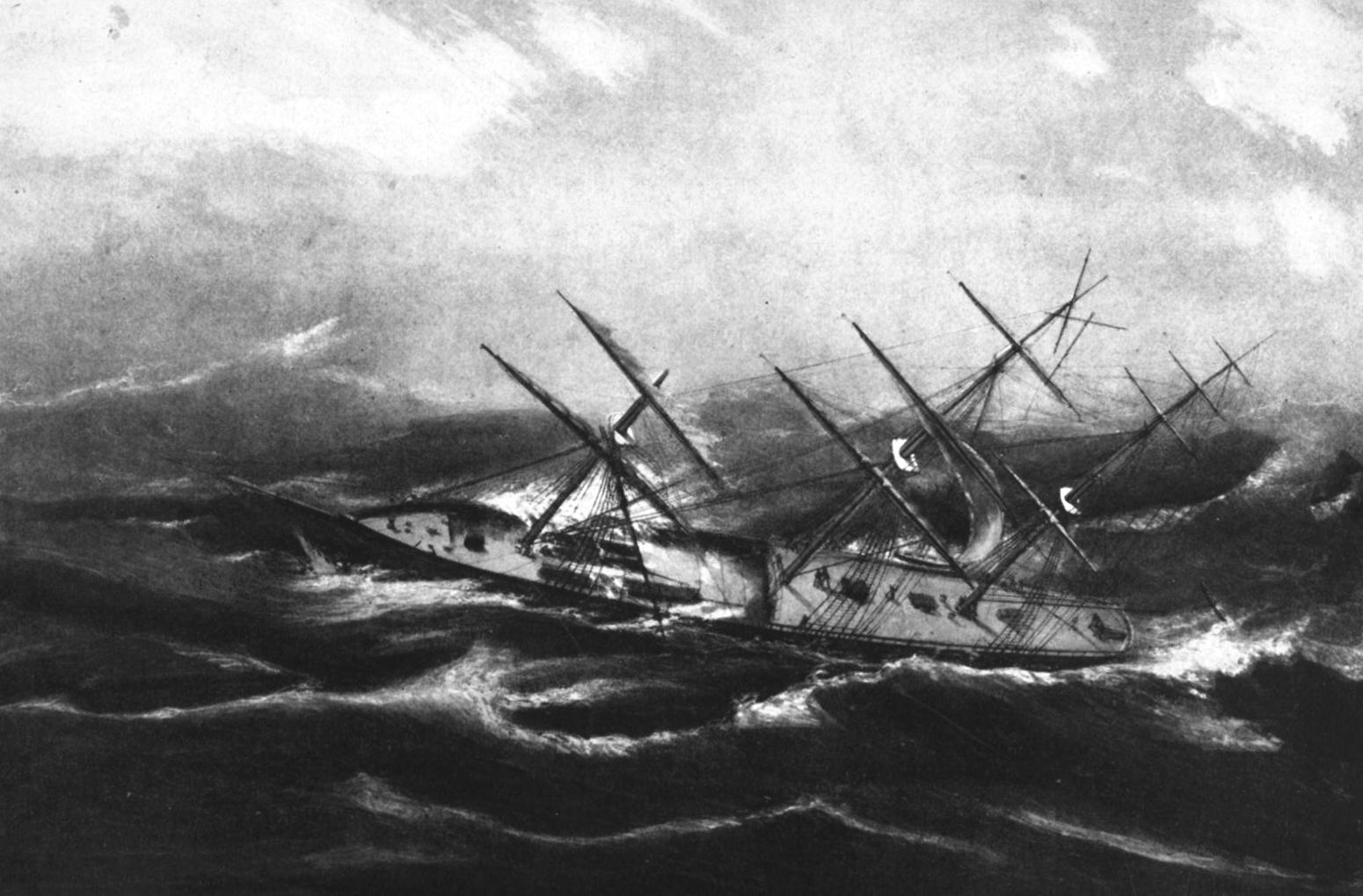
Clipper ship Fiery Star

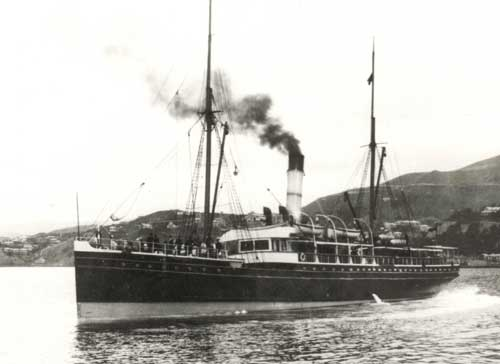
SS Penguin

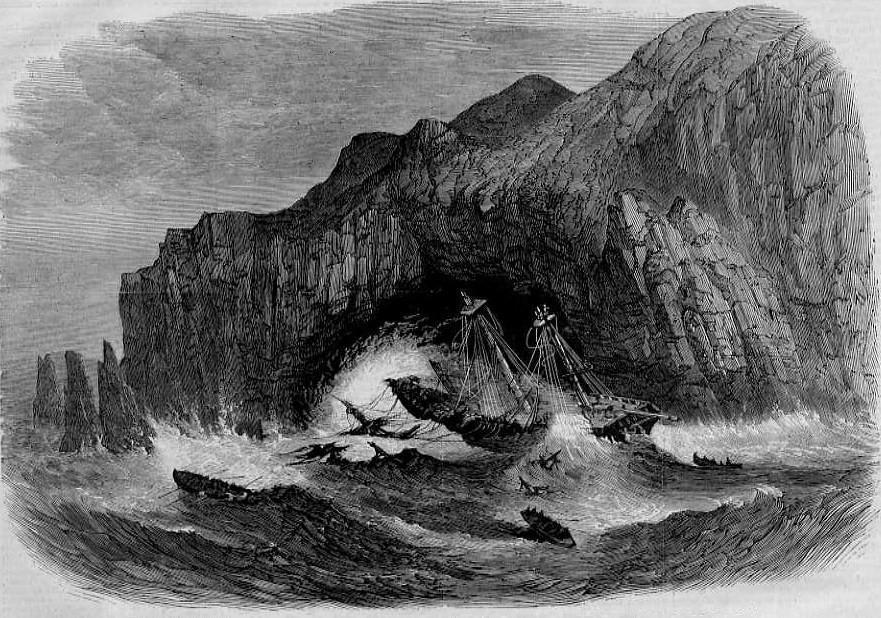
Wreck of the General Grant

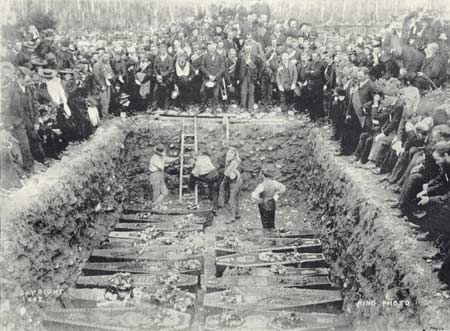
Burial of victims of the Brunner Mine disaster

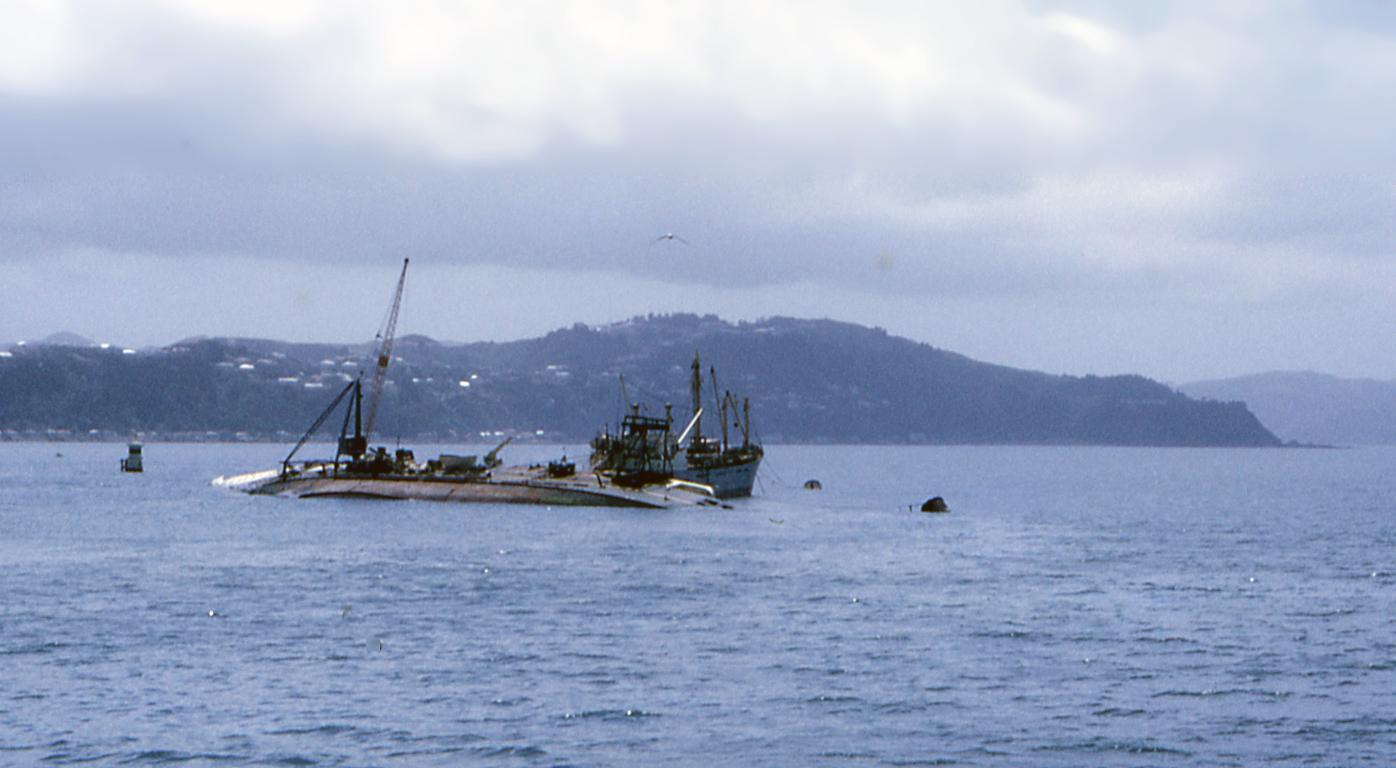
Salvage operations on the wreck of TEV Wahine

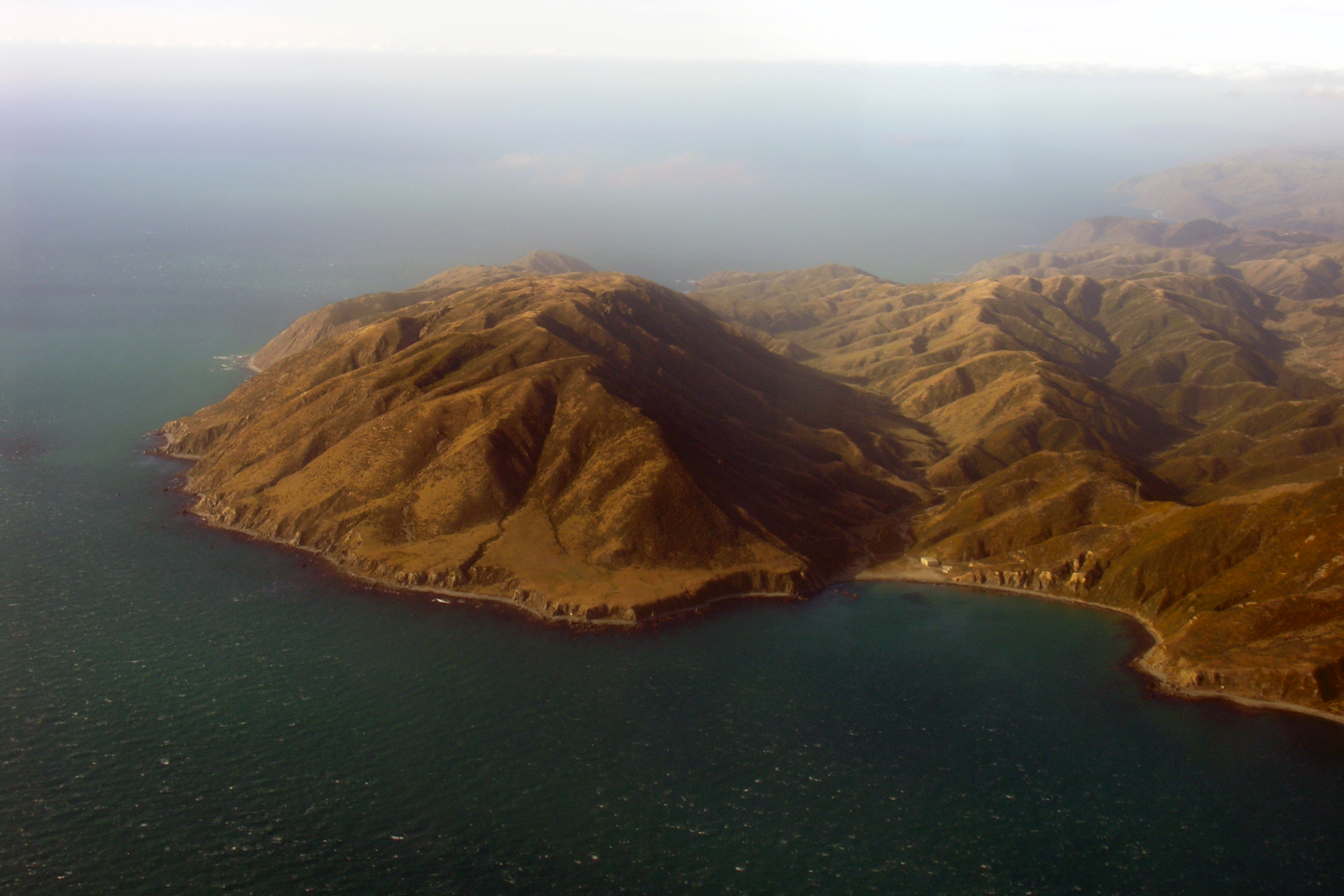
Cape Terawhiti, where the City of Dunedin sank

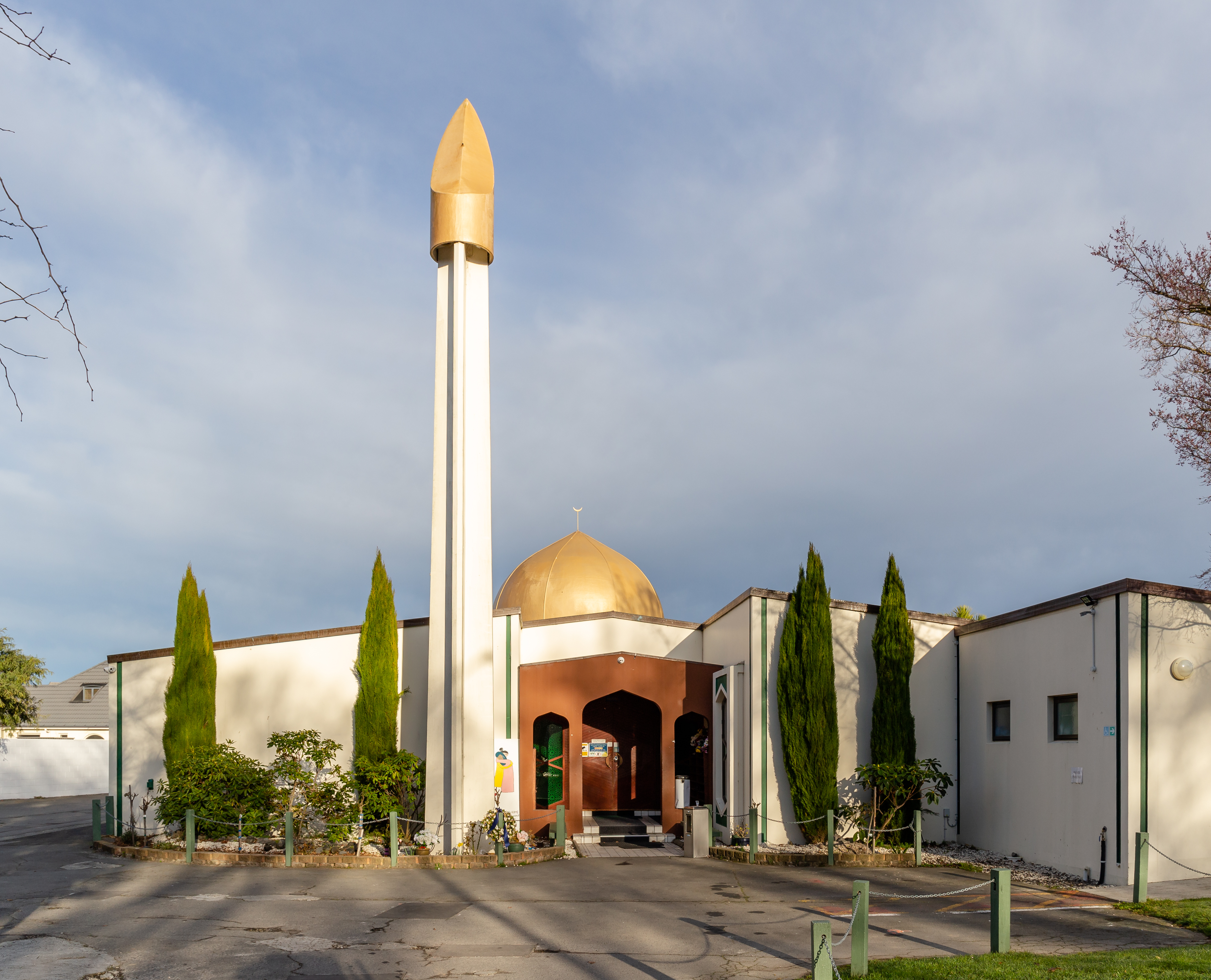
The Al Noor Mosque, where the Christchurch mosque shootings began

Deaths	Name or description	Type	Date	Location	Notes
87	Fiery Star	Shipwreck	11 May 1865	240 km off the Chatham Islands	
75	SS Penguin	Shipwreck	12 February 1909	Off Cape Terawhiti	
68	General Grant	Shipwreck	May 1866	Auckland Island	10 castaways survived the wreck and were successfully rescued.
65	Brunner Mine disaster	Mine explosion	26 March 1896	Brunner	
65	2nd Little Waihi Landslide	Landslide	7 May 1846	Waihi Village	Tribal leader Mananui Te Heuheu Tukino II and most of his family were killed in the landslide
53	TEV Wahine	Shipwreck	10 April 1968	Barrett Reef, Wellington Harbour	
52	City of Dunedin	Shipwreck	20 May 1865	Off Cape Terawhiti	There are estimates of between 250 and 600 passengers perishing, but these reports were 20 or more years later
51+	Blizzard and Flood of 1863	Floods and blizzards	July 1863 – August 1863	Central Otago goldfields	The actual death toll was probably higher because of the transient nature of the miners and the ruggedness of the country
51	Christchurch mosque shootings	Terrorist attack	15 March 2019	Christchurch	

== 10 to 49 deaths ==
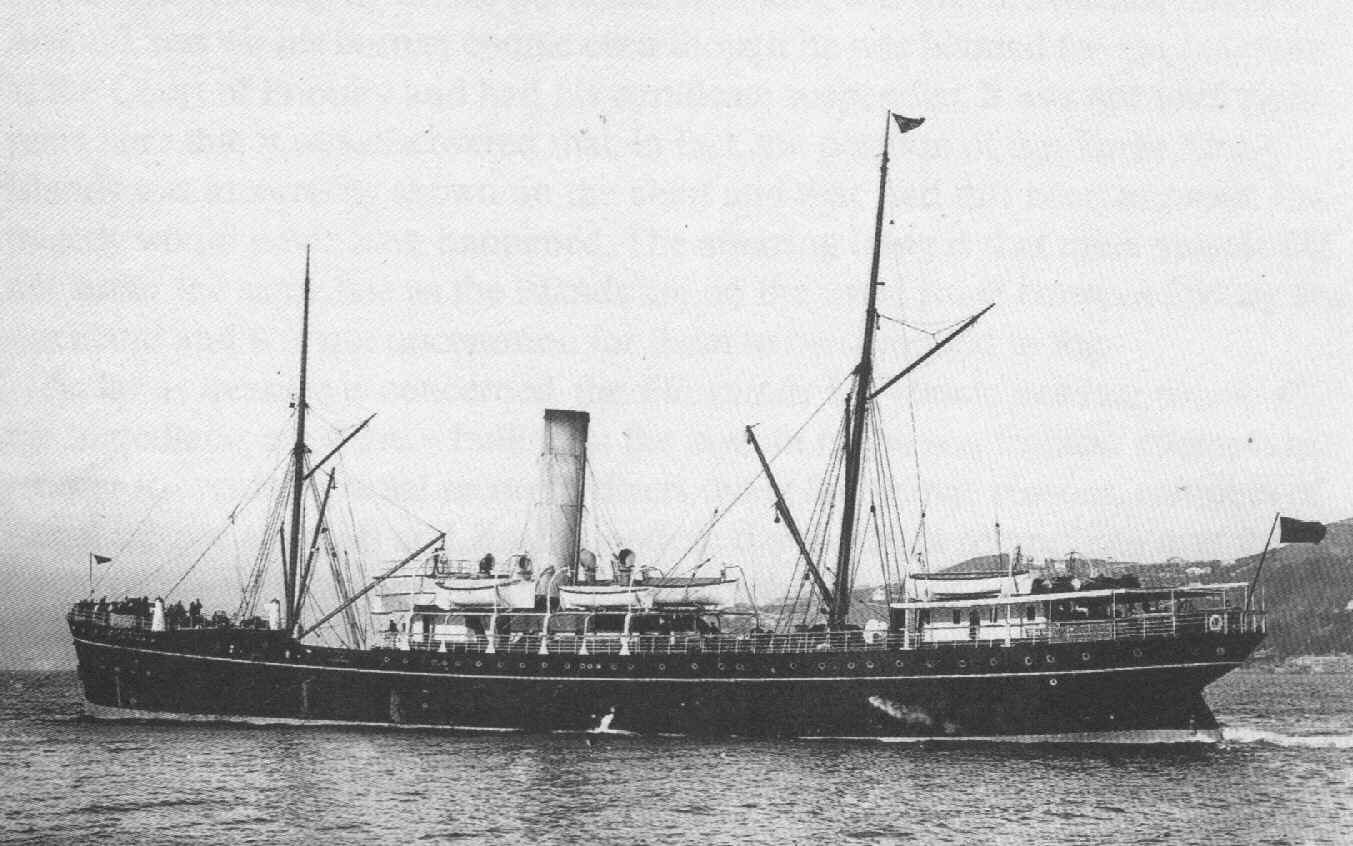
SS Elingamite

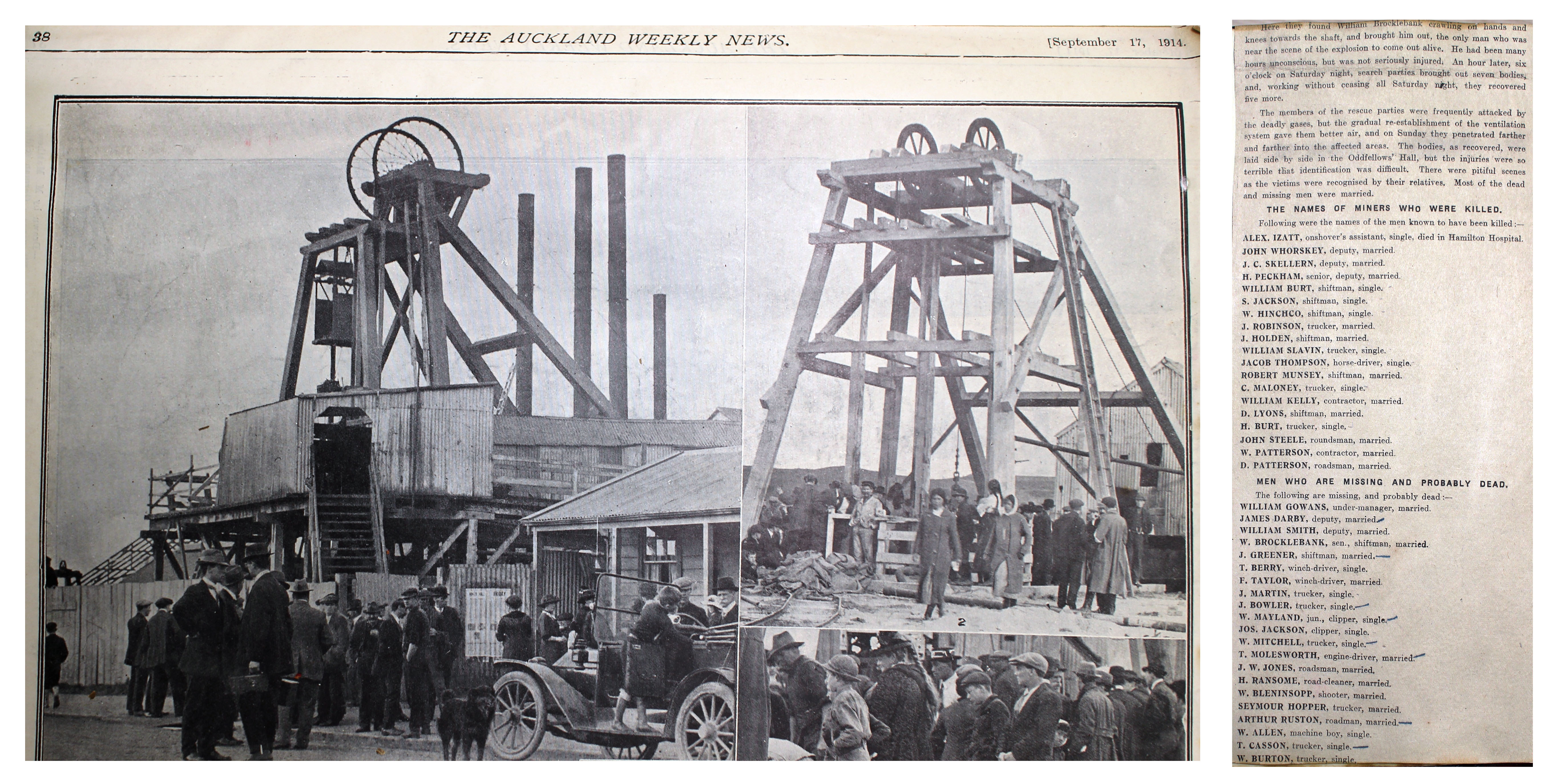
Ralph Mine disaster

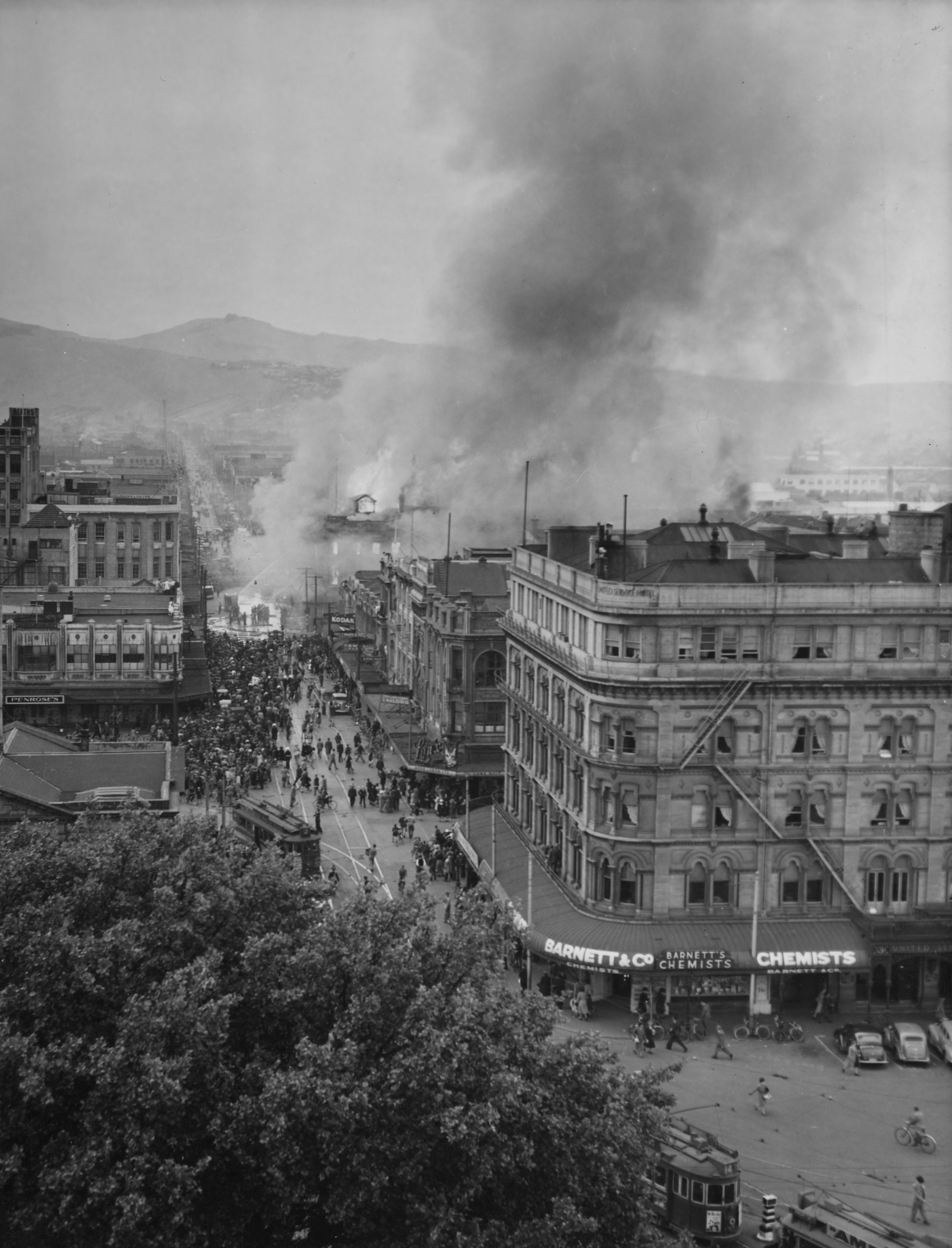
Ballantyne's fire seen from ChristChurch Cathedral

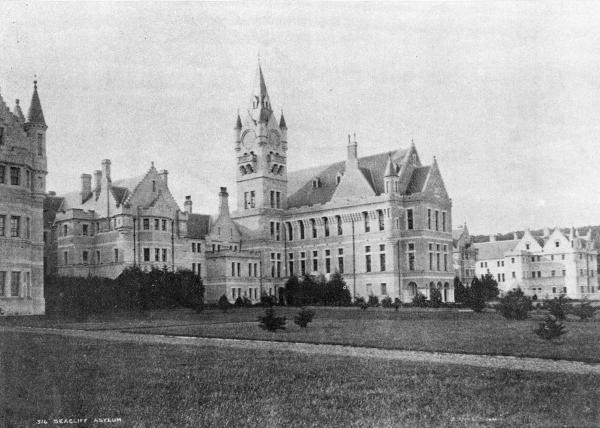
Seacliff asylum, before the fire

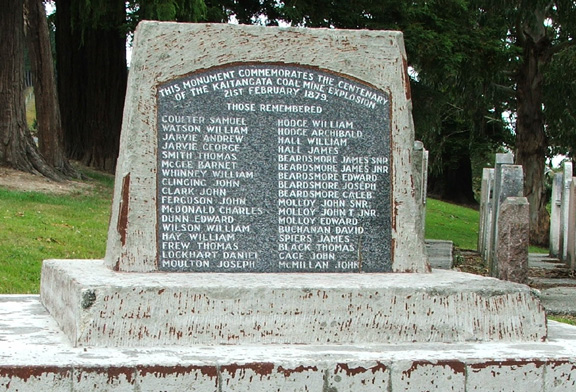
Kaitangata Mine disaster memorial

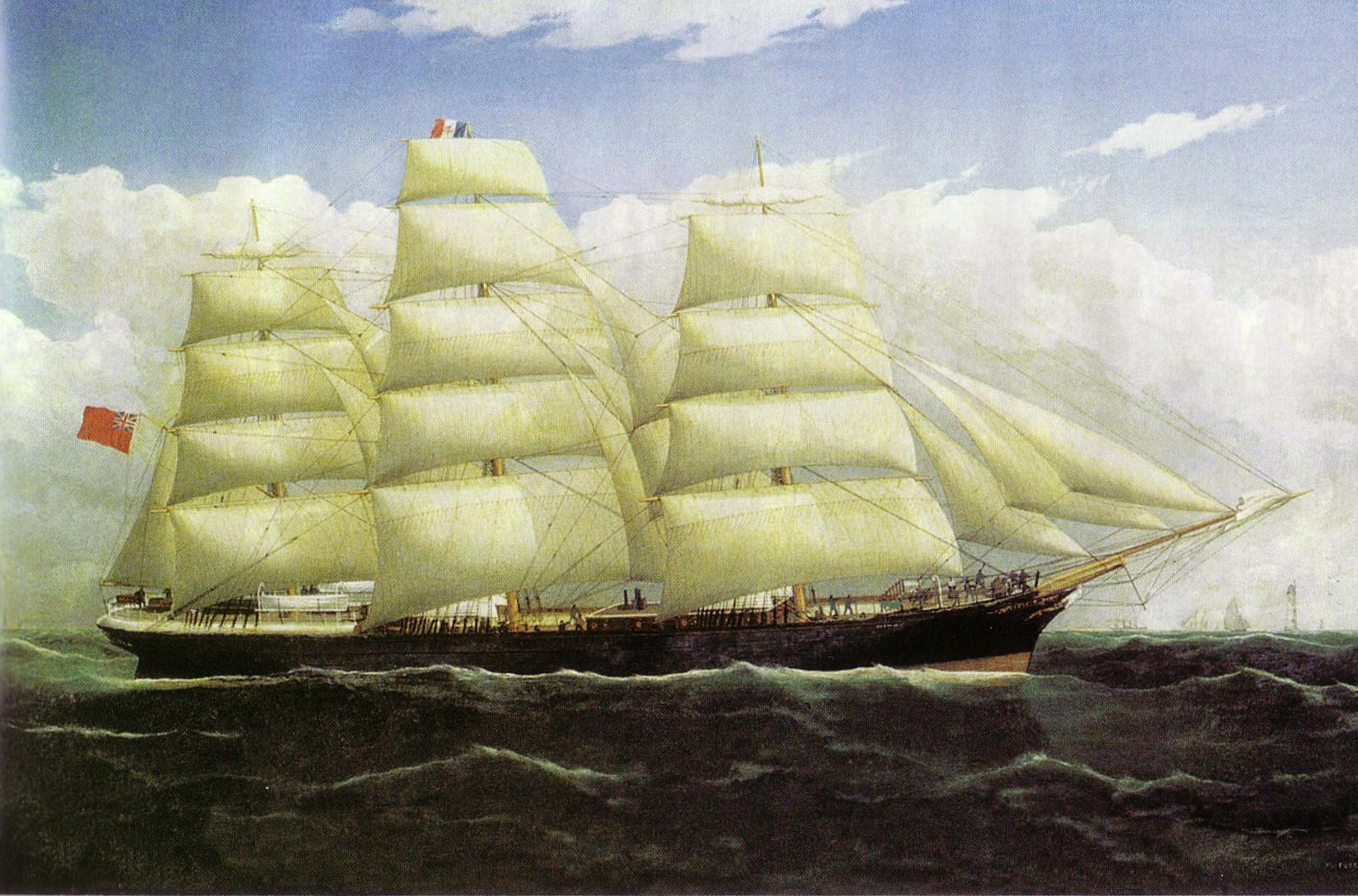
Dunedin

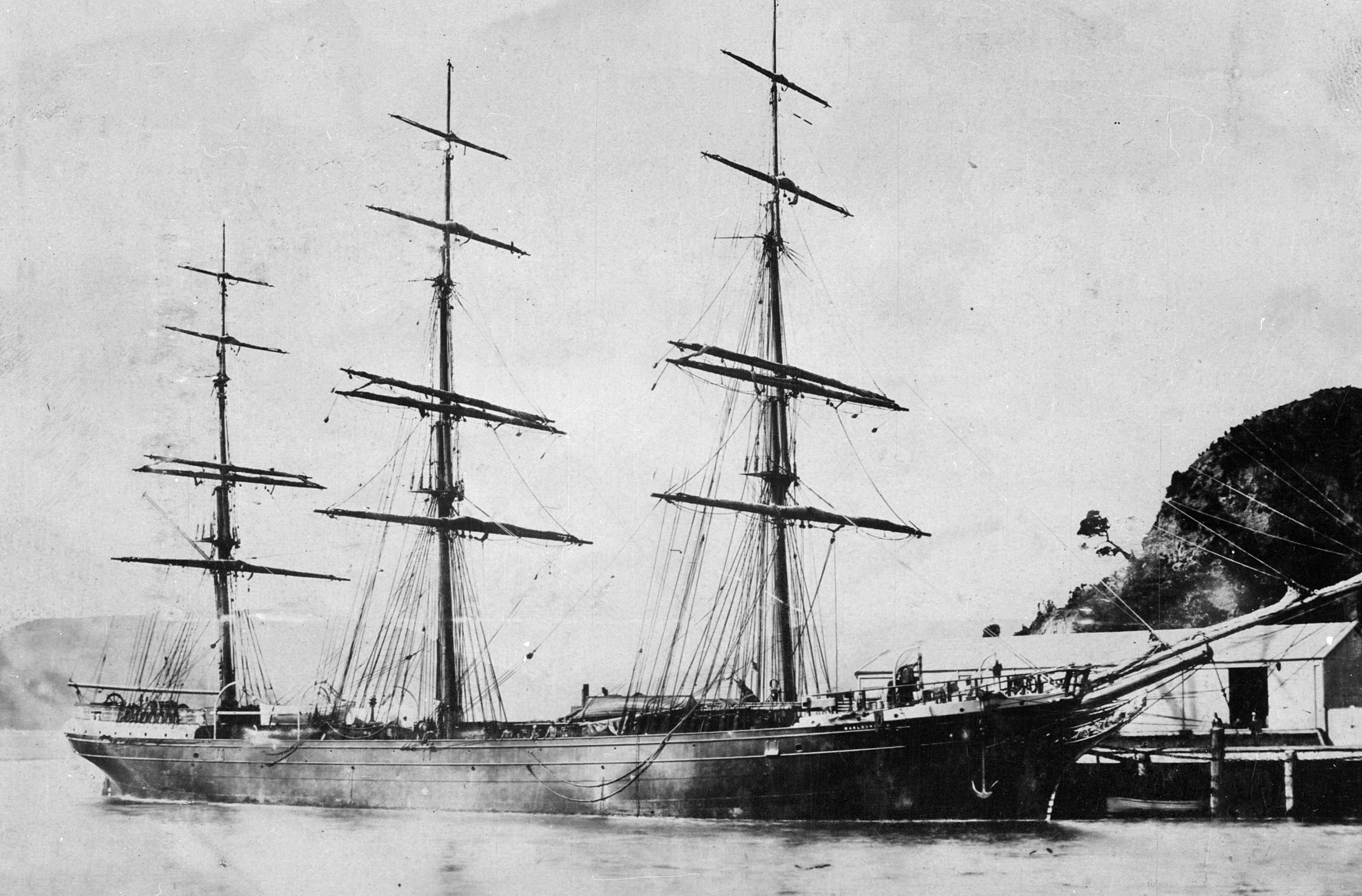
SS Marlborough

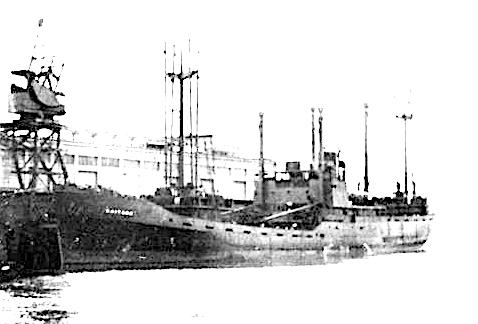
MV Kaitawa

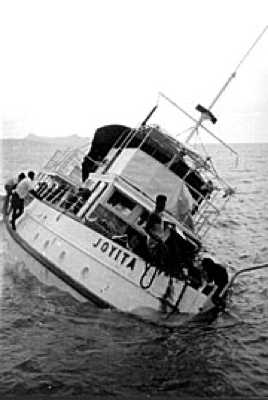
MV Joyita

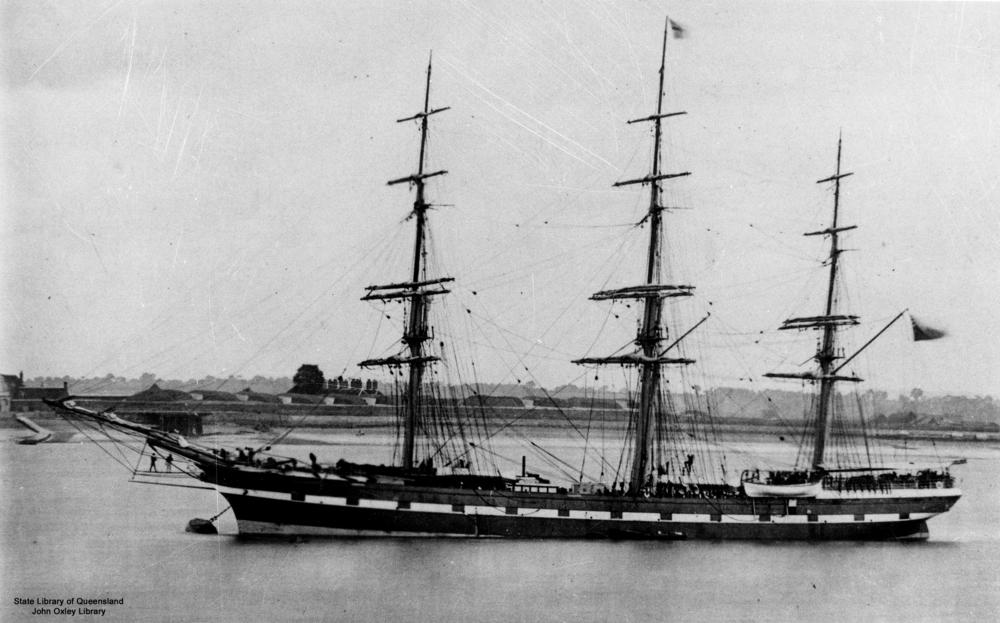
SS Assaye

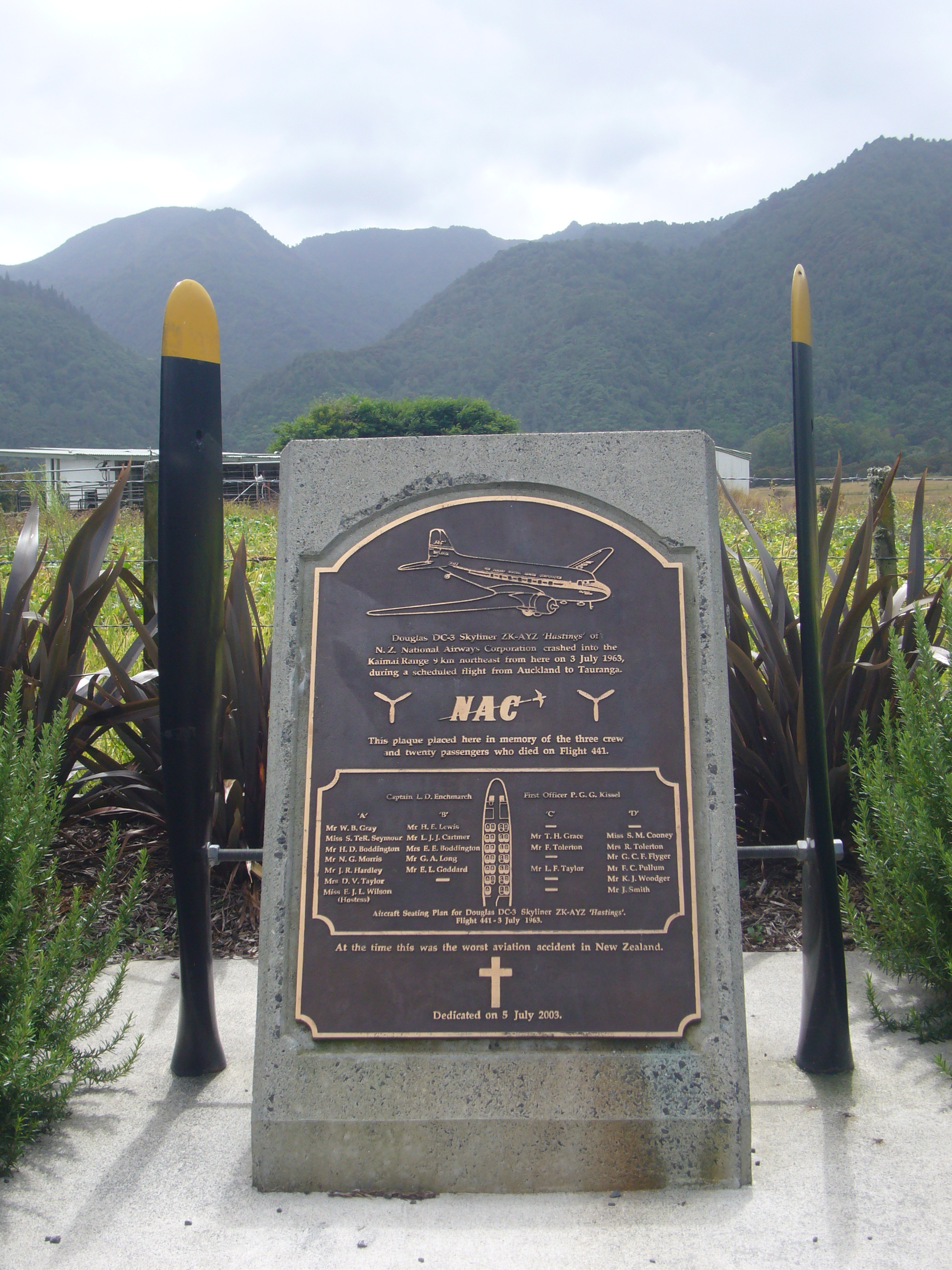
NAC flight 441 memorial

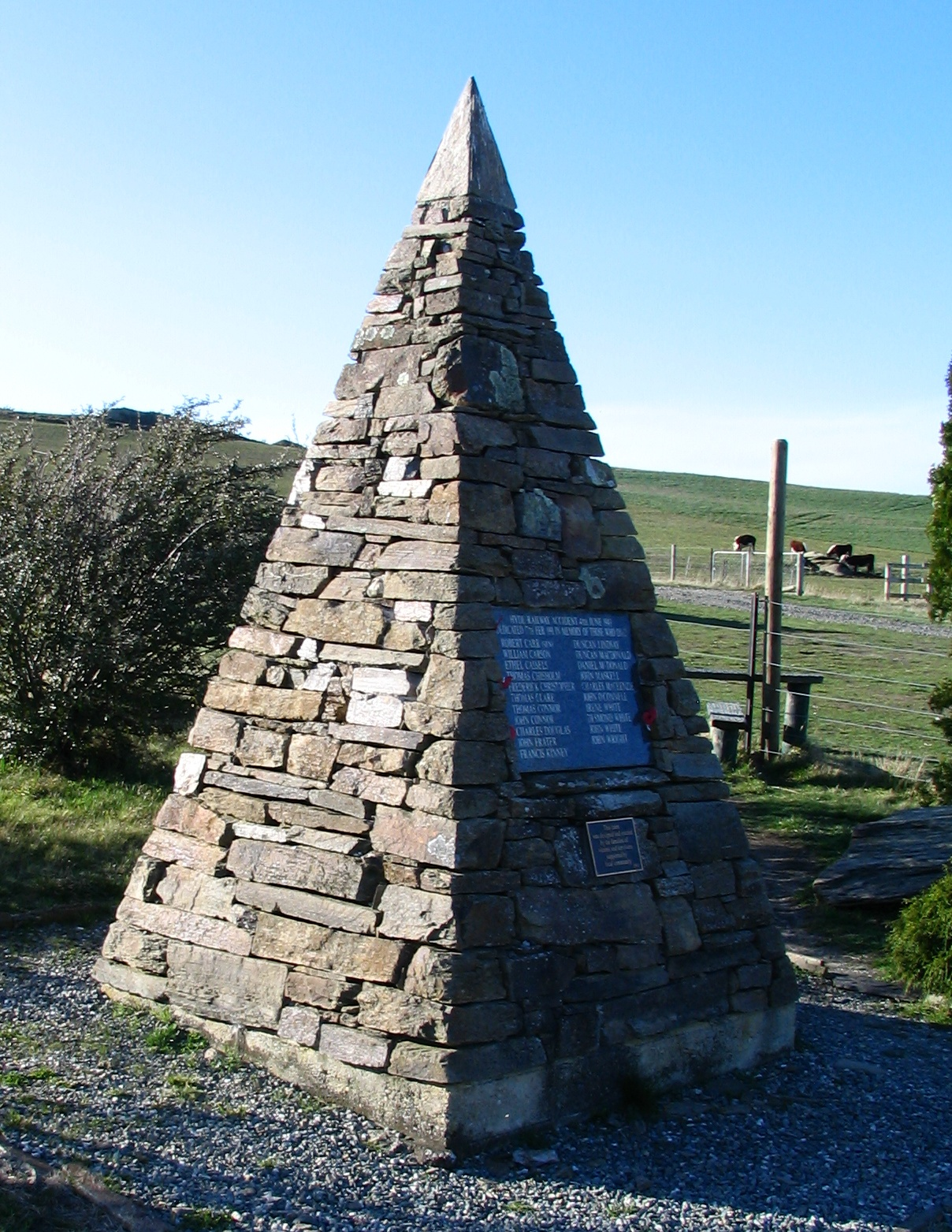
Hyde railway disaster memorial

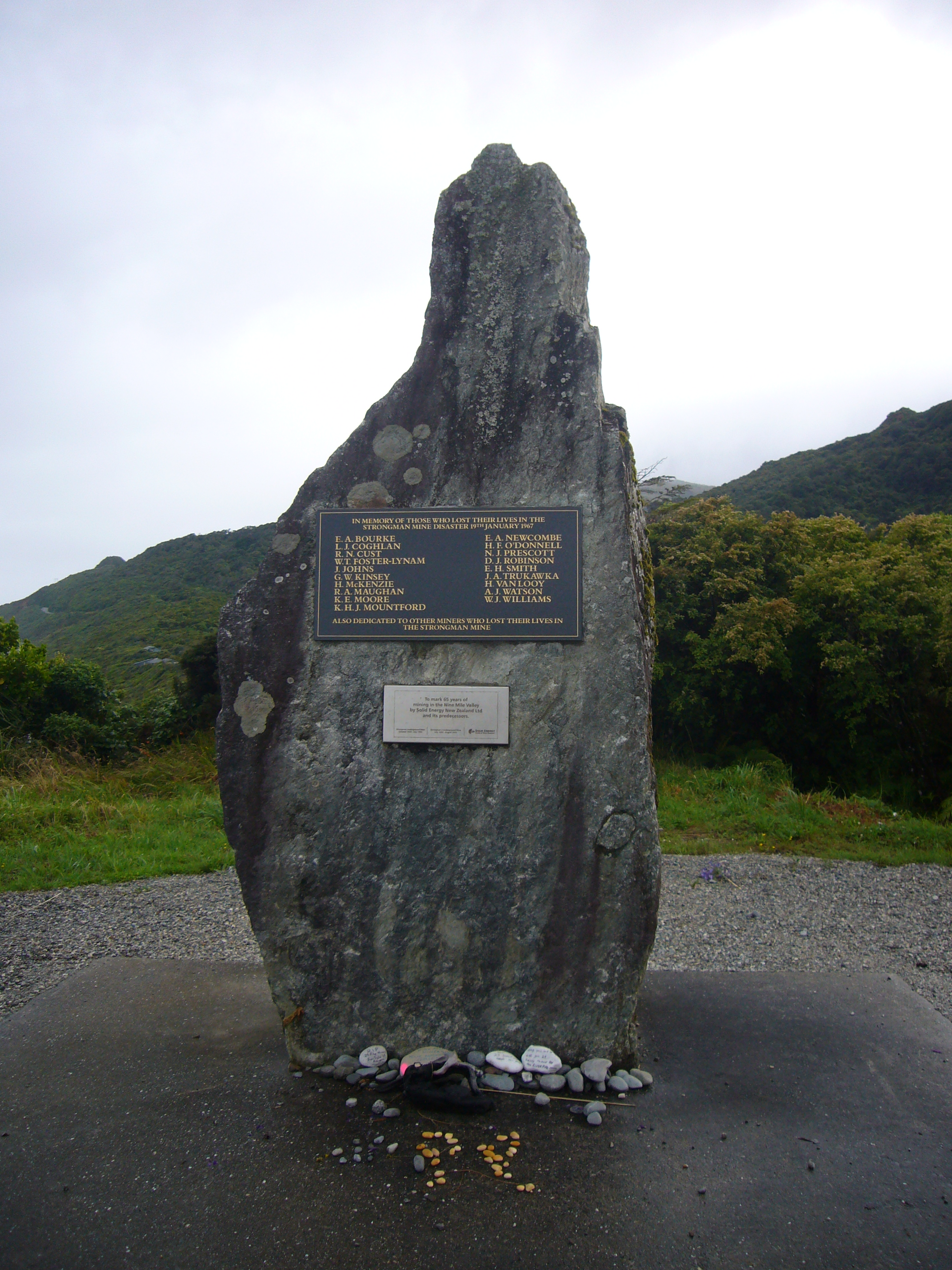
Strongman Mine disaster memorial

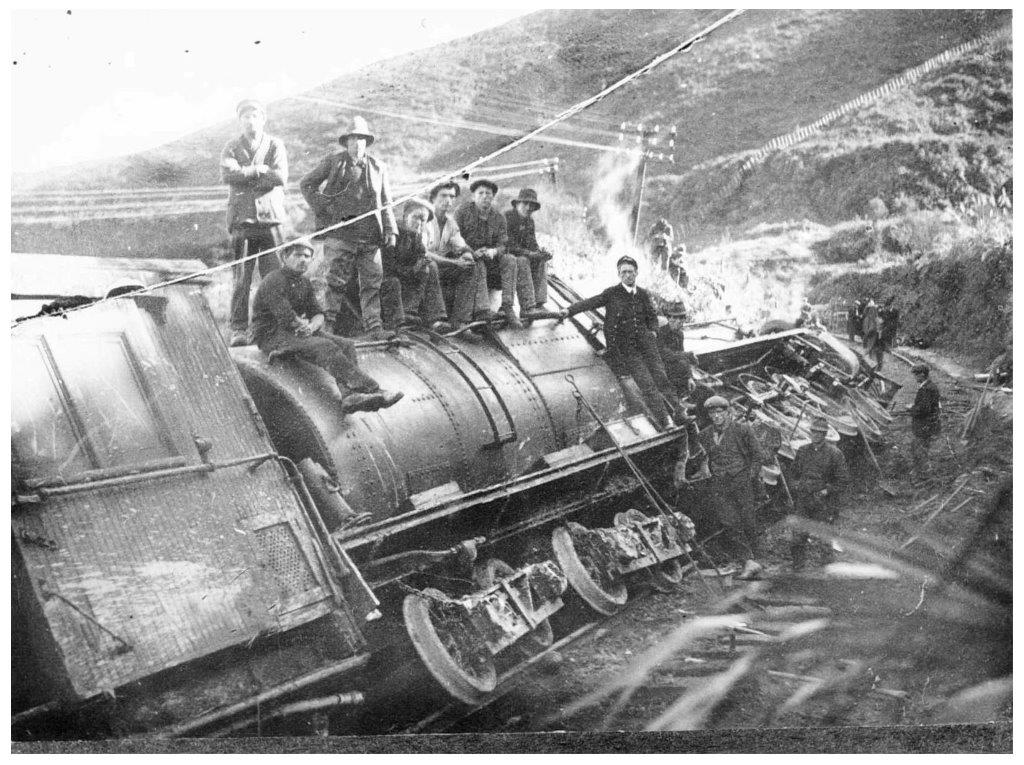
The Ongarue railway disaster

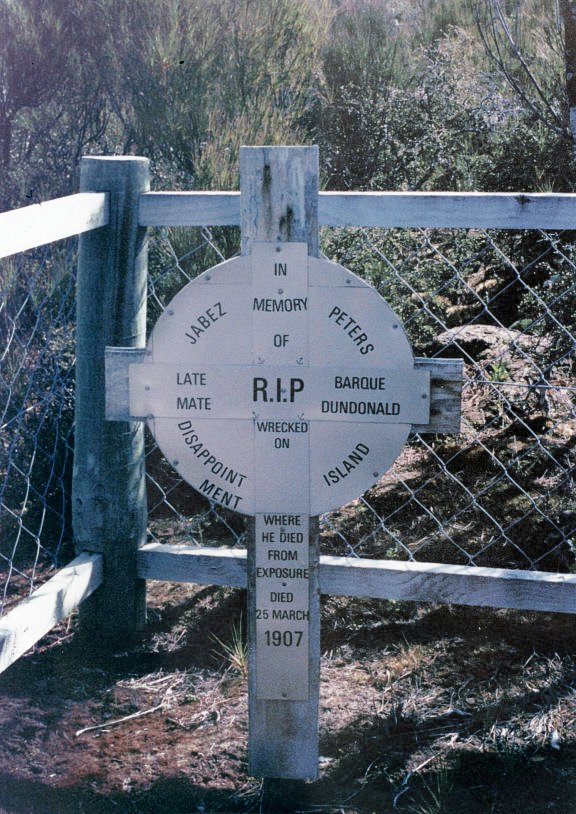
Restored grave of Dundonald's mate, Auckland Islands

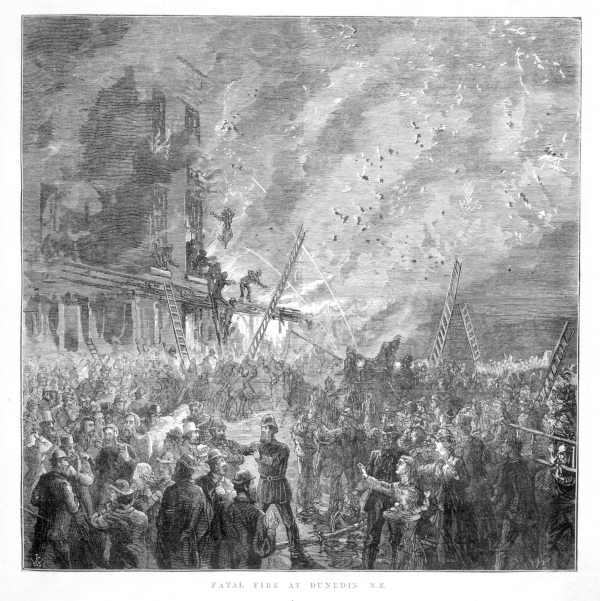
Octagon building fire

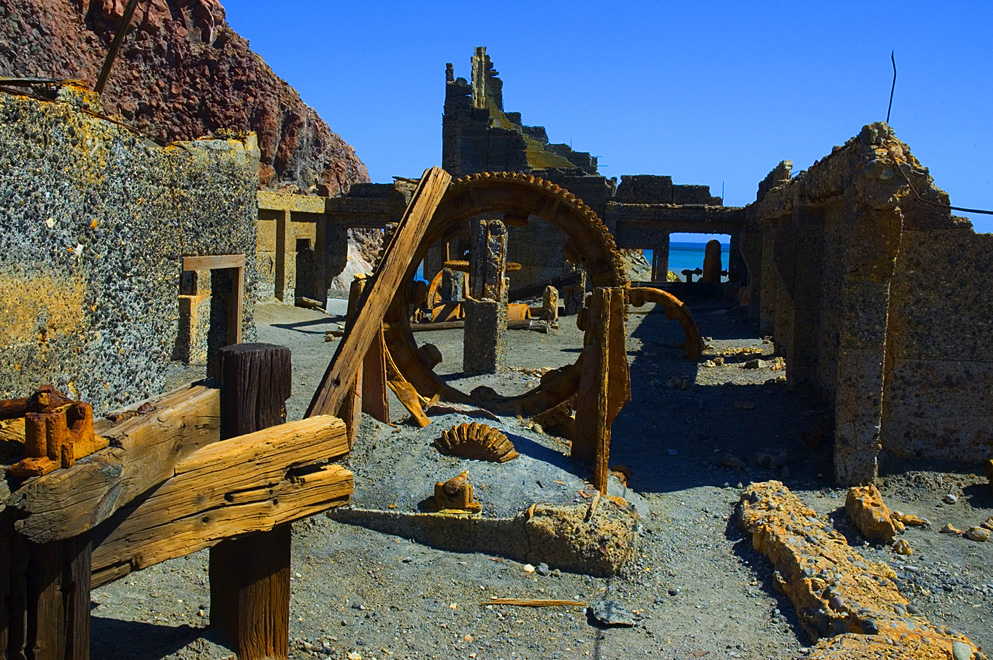
Remains of sulphur mine, White Island

Deaths	Name or description	Type	Date	Location	Notes
49	Featherston Prisoner of war camp riot	Riot	25 February 1943	Featherston	
45	SS Elingamite	Shipwreck	9 November 1902	Off West Island in the Three Kings Islands	
43	Ralph Mine disaster	Mine explosion	12 September 1914	Huntly	Methane and coal dust explosion
41	Ballantynes fire	Fire	18 November 1947	Christchurch	
40+	Great storm of 1868, flash floods and 12 shipwrecks	Storm	3 February 1868	Predominantly eastern areas of New Zealand	Death toll likely understated as impact on many Māori unknown
37	Seacliff Lunatic Asylum	Fire	8 December 1942	Seacliff	
34	Kaitangata Mine disaster	Mine explosion	21 February 1879	Kaitangata	Explosion of fire-damp (methane)
34	SS Taiaroa	Shipwreck	11 April 1886	Waiau Toa / Clarence River mouth	
34	Dunedin	Shipwreck (presumed)	1890	Between Oamaru and London	
30	Marlborough	Shipwreck (presumed)	1890	Between Lyttelton and London	
29	MV Kaitawa	Shipwreck	23 May 1966	Near Pandora Bank, Cape Reinga	
29	Pike River Mine disaster	Mine explosion	19 November 2010	Northwest of Greymouth	Large methane explosion
26	Barque Maria	Shipwreck	1851	Cape Terawhiti	
25+	Storm of 1897	Floods and shipwreck	16 April 1897	North Island	Flooding at Clive, boating accidents, and the wreck of the Zuleika near Cape Palliser. 25 confirmed deaths and 6 unconfirmed
25	MV Joyita	Ghost ship	October 1955	En route from Apia, Samoa to Tokelau	
24	Assaye	Shipwreck (presumed)	1890	Between London and Wellington; wreckage washed up at the Chatham Islands 7 months after the ship left London	
23	New Zealand National Airways Corporation Flight 441	Air accident	3 July 1963	Kaimai Ranges	
22	launch Ranui	Shipwreck	30 December 1950	Off Mount Maunganui, Bay of Plenty	
22	2019 Whakaari/White Island eruption	Volcanic eruption	9 December 2019	Whakaari/White Island	
21	Brigantine Sophia Pate	Shipwreck	August 1841	Kaipara Harbour	
21	Kopuawhara flash flood of 1938	Flood	19 February 1938	Destroyed the Kopuawhara railway workers camp	
21	Hyde railway disaster	Rail accident	4 June 1943	Near Hyde	
20+	Tsunami from 1868 Arica earthquake	Tsunami	13 August 1868	Chatham Islands	
20	Schooner St. Vincent	Shipwreck	14 February 1869	Palliser Bay	
20	RNZAF Douglas C-47 disappearance	Air accident	24 September 1945	En route from Vanuatu	
19	Strongman Mine	Mine explosion	19 January 1967	Near Greymouth	
18	Canoe on Lake Rotorua	Boating accident	16 April 1870	Near Mokoia Island on Lake Rotorua	
18	Clyde	Shipwreck	6 November 1884	Horseshoe Bay, near Akaroa, Banks Peninsula	
18	Canoe on Motu River	Boating accident	4 August 1900	Motu River – 25 miles from Opotiki	There were 16 children and 2 adults in the six person canoe
18	Ketch Enterprise and steamer Tauranga	Shipwreck	23 July 1870	Between Cape Rodney and Sail Rock, Hauraki Gulf	Those lost — fourteen crew and four passengers — all came from the Tauranga. The crew of the Enterprise survived in the ship's longboat.
18	Lastingham	Shipwreck	1 September 1884	Cape Jackson, Cook Strait	
17	Ongarue railway disaster	Rail accident	6 July 1923	Ongarue	
17	1929 Murchison earthquake	Earthquake	17 June 1929	Murchison	
16	1943 Liberator crash at Whenuapai	Air accident	2 August 1943	Whenuapai	Those killed were mainly Japanese civilians who were being repatriated in a prisoner exchange.
16	Capitaine Bougainville	Shipwreck	3 September 1975	Whananaki	
15	Lockheed Lodestar airliner crash	Air accident	18 March 1949	Near Waikanae	
15	MV Holmglen	Shipwreck	24 November 1959	Near Timaru	
15	Brynderwyns bus accident	Road accident	7 February 1963	Brynderwyn Hills	
15	Derry Castle	Shipwreck	20 March 1887	Enderby Island, Auckland Islands	
14	Hutt River flood	Floods	17 January 1858	Hutt Valley	
14	Two Hudson bombers lost off the New Zealand coast	Air accident	21 August 1944	En route from Fiji	No. 4 Squadron RNZAF
14	Aramoana massacre	Spree killing	13 November 1990	Aramoana, near Dunedin	
14	Cave Creek disaster	Structural failure	28 April 1995	Paparoa National Park	
13	Tasmania	Shipwreck	1897	Māhia Peninsula	
13	SS Ventnor	Shipwreck	28 October 1902	Off Omapere, Hokianga	
13	NAC Electra air crash	Air accident	23 October 1948	On Mount Ruapehu	
12	L'Alcmène	Shipwreck	3 June 1851	Baylys Beach, Kaipara	A French navy corvette
12	Ferry Pride of the Yarra and paddle steamer Favourite	Collision	6 July 1863	Otago Harbour	
12	Cafe Chantant fire, The Octagon, Dunedin	Fire	8 September 1879	Dunedin	
12	Barque Lizzie Bell	Shipwreck	24 July 1901	Waimate, Taranaki	
12	Barque Dundonald	Shipwreck	7 March 1907	Disappointment Island, Auckland Islands	
12	Brigantine Rio Loge	Shipwreck (presumed)	January 1909	Last seen in Cook Strait on 14 January, en route from Kaipara to Dunedin	May have caused the wreck of the Penguin a month later.
12	Cyclone of 1936	Storm	1 February 1936	North Island and upper South Island	A tropical cyclone that originated near the Solomon Islands
11	Glen Afton No. 1 mine	Coal mine fire	24 September 1939	Huntly	11 miners, including the mine manager, died from carbon monoxide asphyxia
11	B17 bomber crash	Air accident	12 June 1942	RNZAF Base Auckland at Whenuapai	
11	2012 Carterton hot air balloon crash	Air accident	7 January 2012	Near Carterton	
11	Cyclone Gabrielle	Cyclone	12 February 2023–16 February 2023	North Island and northern South Island	
10	Shamrock sailing boat	Shipwreck	1834	Queen Charlotte Sound	Capsized and sank. Exact location unknown.
10	Brig Australia	Shipwreck	23 May 1873	Off Cape Campbell	
10	White Island sulphur mine	Lahar following volcano crater wall collapse	10 September 1914	Whakaari/White Island	No bodies found.
10	Husky and Argo lost to storm in yacht race	Shipwrecks	21 January 1951	Between Wellington and Christchurch	
10	Aspiring Air Britten-Norman Islander, collided with terrain	Air crash	8 August 1989	Upper Dart Valley	
10	January 2026 New Zealand storms	Weather	15 January 2026–24 January 2026	Upper North Island	Landslides and flooding

NOTE: The exact number of deaths in some early New Zealand shipwrecks is not fully recorded. There may be several shipwrecks not listed here which claimed ten or more lives.

== Significant incidents resulting in fewer than 10 deaths ==
Deaths	Name or description	Type	Date	Location	Notes
9	1855 Wairarapa earthquake	Earthquake	23 January 1855	Lake Wairarapa	
9	2010 Fox Glacier FU-24 crash	Air accident	4 September 2010	Fox Glacier	
7	1941 Kowhitirangi shootings	Spree killing	8 October 1941–9 October 1941	Kowhitirangi, near Hokitika	Four police officers and three civilians killed
7	Cyclone Bola	Cyclone	6 March 1988–12 March 1988	North Island	
7	Mangatepopo Canyon disaster	Flood	15 April 2008	Tongariro National Park	
7	2015 Fox Glacier helicopter crash	Air accident	21 November 2015	Fox Glacier	
6	Raurimu massacre	Spree killing	8 February 1997	Raurimu	
5	Loafers Lodge fire	Fire	16 May 2023	Newtown, Wellington	Determined to be arson
4	Ansett New Zealand Flight 703	Air accident	9 June 1995	Tararua Range, near Palmerston North	
4	2023 Auckland Anniversary Weekend floods	Flood	27 January 2023–2 February 2023	Upper North Island	
3	1968 Inangahua earthquake	Earthquake	24 May 1968	Near Inangahua Junction	
3	2023 Auckland shooting	Shooting	20 July 2023	Auckland CBD	
2	1966 Air New Zealand DC-8 crash	Air accident	4 July 1966	Near Auckland Airport	
2	Air New Zealand Flight 4374	Air accident	17 February 1979	Near Auckland Airport	
2	Airwork Flight 23	Air accident	3 May 2005	Near Stratford	
2	2010 Canterbury earthquake	Earthquake	4 September 2010	Near Darfield	
2	2016 Kaikōura earthquake	Earthquake	14 November 2016	Near Waiau	
1	1987 Edgecumbe earthquake	Earthquake	2 March 1987	Near Edgecumbe	

== Pandemics and health crises ==
Deaths	Description	Date	Location	Notes
8,600	1918 flu pandemic	1918 October–December	Nationwide	
4,624	COVID-19 pandemic	2020 February–ongoing	Nationwide	Total deaths attributed to COVID-19 as at 13 April 2025. (Statistics updated weekly.)
757	HIV/AIDS pandemic	1983–ongoing	Nationwide	As of 2023.
69	2009 swine flu pandemic	2009 April–September	Nationwide	

== Significant incidents of New Zealanders being killed overseas ==
Confirmed Deaths	Name	Type	Date	Location	Notes
470	Cospatrick	Ship lost to fire	17 November 1874	640 km south-west of the Cape of Good Hope, en route to Auckland	Only 3 people survived
100	The Trevelyan (immigrant ship en route from Glasgow)	Storm	3 June 1888	Presumed foundered off the South African coast, en route to Port Chalmers, New Zealand	
89	Knowsley Hall	Shipwreck (presumed)	1879	Between London and Lyttelton	
79	Matoaka	Shipwreck (presumed)	1869	Between Lyttelton and London	
20	Pan Am Flight 816	Air accident	22 July 1973	Papeete, French Polynesia	From list of passengers from Auckland
15	1943 RNZAF Catalina crash	Air accident	5 June 1943	South of Fiji	
14	Pan Am Flight 806	Air accident	30 January 1974	Pago Pago, American Samoa	Only New Zealand deaths listed
12	1945 RNZAF Catalina crash	Air accident	27 January 1945	Off Beqa, Fiji	
10	Bere Ferrers rail accident, train hit NZ troops on tracks by platform	Train accident	24 September 1917	Bere Ferrers, Devon, UK	

== See also ==
- List of earthquakes in New Zealand
- List of massacres in New Zealand
- List of natural disasters in New Zealand
- List of New Zealand-related topics
- List of rail accidents in New Zealand
