= Mariano Vella =

New Zealand seaman, fisherman, and farmer

Mariano Vella (19 January 1855 – 5 September 1929) was a notable New Zealand seaman, fisherman, and farmer. He was born in Macarsca, Dalmatia in 1855. After his first wife died, he returned to Dalmatia in 1894 and married Elizabetta Caterina Tarabochia, later known in New Zealand as Elizabeth. On their journey to New Zealand, they survived the sinking of the SS Wairarapa.
