= Storm of 1897 =

Storm in North Island, New Zealand

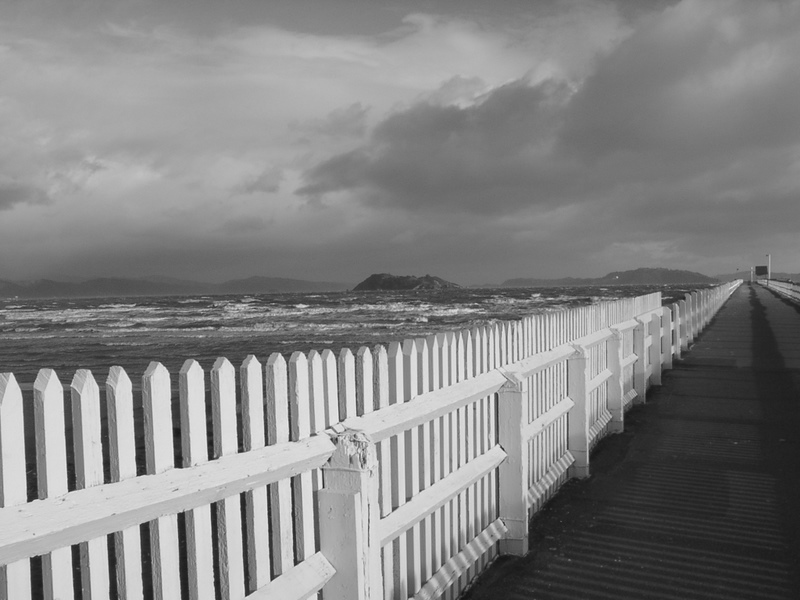
A southerly storm on Wellington Harbour from Petone

The storm of 1897 was a severe storm that struck the lower to central North Island of New Zealand on 16 April 1897. It caused the ship Zuleika to run aground near Cape Palliser, with the loss of 12 lives, and severe flooding. At Clive the flooding caused the loss of a further 12 lives and one person was drowned near Kāpiti. There were six further unconfirmed reports of drowning, bringing the total loss of life directly related to the storm event to between 25 and 31. Based on descriptions of the storm, particularly that of Captain Marten of the Waiapu, it may have been an extratropical cyclone.

== The storm ==
=== Prelude ===
Weather reports on the 14 April indicated an approaching storm with a falling barometer especially in the south and with winds from a generally northerly direction. The barometer at Bluff registered 29.46 inHg (998 hPa). By 15 April, the wind was moving to the south, with barometric pressure being variable. Warnings were issued for southerly gales for the South Island and lower North Island. On 16 April, Wellington was subject to a southerly gale with a number of ships taking shelter.

=== Railway damage ===
The New Plymouth–Wanganui train was hit by a slip about 3/4 mile (1.2 km) from the Goat Valley Tunnel. The slip derailed the mail van and a passenger carriage. No one was injured in the accident. Two spans of the Rangitikei River bridge were also washed away, effectively stopping all rail traffic between Whanganui and Palmerston North. Telegraph lines had also been brought down by the storm making communication difficult. The lines around Napier and Hastings were flooded with bridges washed out.

=== Shipwrecks ===
Conditions at Wellington Harbour heads were so bad that no steamers were able to leave, the wind being too strong. The first to make it out was the Union Steam Ship Company's SS Rotomahana. Those entering the harbour struggled with the lack of visibility, preferring to either take shelter or like the Tulune from Lyttelton under Captain Philips ride out the storm until visibility improved. Numerous yachts moored in the harbour slipped their moorings and were destroyed.

==== Wreck of the Zuleika ====
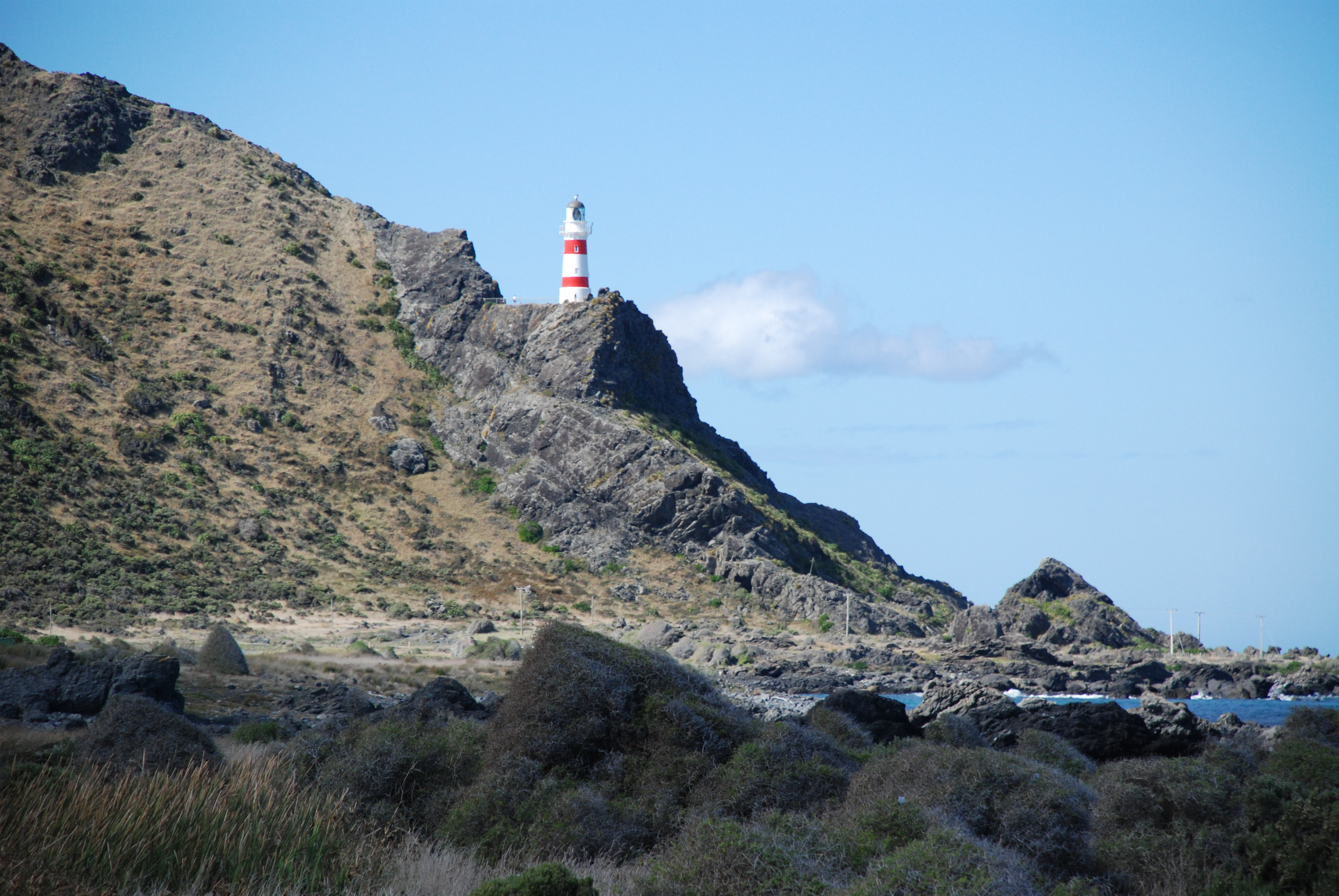
Cape Palliser and lighthouse

The 1000 ton iron ship Zuleika left Dunedin for Wellington on 14 April. She was becalmed outside Taiaroa Head until late the following day when she picked up a breeze. After passing Banks Peninsula she encountered a gale at about midnight on 15 April. On 16 April around 11pm, she sighted land and unsuccessfully attempted to take evasive action. The ship grounded 4 miles (6 km) from Cape Palliser lighthouse and began to break up around 2am, so the crew donned life jackets, abandoned ship, and made for the shore. Of the 21 crew members only 12 survived.

==== Schooner Waiapu ====
The schooner Waiapu was off Castlepoint on the morning of 17 April between 1am and 5am, 150 miles (241 km) to the north of where the Zuleika was driven ashore. The Waiapu's Captain Marten described the sea in the area at that time as tremendous and converging from all directions, with torrential rain, hail, and lightning. During this time there was no wind suggesting to the captain that he was in the eye of a cyclone. Considering his ship in danger from the very rough seas and unable to use his sails because of the lack of wind, the captain used the ships engines to leave the calm area. In four hours the ship ran back into the gale, which continued to rage for two days.

==== Wreck of the Pirate ====
North of Napier, the sloop Pirate had her sails blown out by the gale, an easterly in that area, and was driven onto rocks on Portland Island. The crew managed to reach safety.

=== Flooding ===
Flooding was reported around Bulls with several bridges washed out. The Wellington museum recorded 6.07 inches of rain over 48 hours to 9:30am on the 17th resulting in a number of slips and some surface flooding in the wider Wellington area. There was also damage to the Takapau Railway Bridge on the Palmerston North–Gisborne Line, plus some slips in the Manawatū Gorge. In Hawkes Bay there were large areas of flooding with sections of Hastings and much of the surrounding countryside underwater and damage to a number of bridges. Flooding was also reported as far inland as Waipawa.

==== Clive ====
On 17 April, Clive was described as underwater with reports that some houses had been washed away and several others only their roofs showing above the flood waters. The situation continued to deteriorate with a telegraphed message from the township for Gods sake send us some help. That was the last message received. At Waitangi the railway embankment was washed away making the only means to get to the township by boat. The Napier pilot boat was dispatched to the area and began rescuing people stranded by the flood waters. Two additional boats that had sailed for the area disappeared with trace. The boats each had five men on board.

=== Casualties ===
The first reported casualty of the storm was John Anderson, who drowned when his boat from Kapiti overturned opposite the wreck of the Hydrabad. At Omahu, in Hawkes Bay, two Māori were washed from their horses in the flood water and their fates were unknown. Two rescue boats with five men each disappeared without trace on their way to Clive. Near Clive, the son of a Mr Broadbent, was swept out to sea and drowned. A man named Double was reported missing from Omahu and three men were reported drowned at Ohiti. James Cunningham drowned in a flooded creek on Chesterhope Station. Twelve were drowned at Cape Palliser in the Zuleika wreck. In total, 25 lives were confirmed lost and a further six possibly lost in the storm, making it among the deadliest to strike New Zealand.

== See also ==
- List of disasters in New Zealand by death toll
