= City of Dunedin (ship) =

Side wheel paddle steamer

History
- Name: City of Dunedin
- Owner: John Jones and John Cargill
- Port of registry: (United Kingdom of Great Britain and Ireland)
- Route: Port Chalmers, Dunedin to Hokitika
- Builder: Denny & Co, Dumbarton
- Yard number: 28
- Completed: 16 June 1863
- Fate: Wrecked 20 May 1865

General characteristics
- Type: Clipper
- Tonnage: 327 gross register tons (GRT)
- Length: 167 ft (51 m)
- Beam: 22 ft (6.7 m)
- Depth: 17 ft (5.2 m)
- Installed power: 2 × 50 hp Denny and Co diagonal boilers
- Propulsion: paddle
- Sail plan: schooner rigged
- Speed: 10 knots

The City of Dunedin was a 327-ton side wheel paddle steamer wrecked in Cook Strait near Cape Terawhiti on 20 May 1865 while sailing from Wellington to Hokitika via Nelson with the loss of all on board. Captain James Parker Boyd commanded her.

== Construction ==
The City of Dunedin was an iron paddle steamer built in Glasgow by Archibald Denny of Dumbarton. She was fitted with 100 hp Denny and Co steam engines. Miss Margaret Robson of Glasgow named her.

She had been built specifically for the coastal trade around New Zealand. She was owned by Jones and Co of Otago.

She was described as not being elegant in appearance, but .. handsome proportions, and thorough adaption for the trade in which she is to be employed ... She had a full length spar deck, a new type of windlass to aid mooring and unmooring the vessel. The main deck was 7 feet (2.1 m) below the spar deck. She had fore and aft holds, separated by the engine room. Her dimensions were 167 feet (51 m) long by 23-foot (7.0 m) beam. Her fully laden draught was 6.5 feet (2.0 m) and her depth 15 feet (4.6 m). Her normal speed was 10 knots (19 km/h; 12 mph). There were 56 berths for passengers.

John Jones who owned a 54/64ths share in the boat had not insured his share. The remaining 10/64th owners had insured their shares.

== Maiden voyage ==
Her maiden voyage from Glasgow to Dunedin under Captain McFarlane took 87 days. She left Glasgow on 9 July and arrived in Dunedin in November. The ships engineers for the journey were inexperienced and did not maintain the engines properly. On reaching the Bay of Biscay the ship no longer ran on steam and had to revert to sail. She put into Madeira to repair the engines and to the Cape Verde Islands to obtain coal. On reaching the equator the ship again reverted to sail until it reached the Solanders. The journey was without incident until 600 miles from the Cape of Good Hope where she ran into strong winds. After arriving at Dunedin she was sent over to Melbourne to be docked as there was no dock at Dunedin.

== Coastal trade ==
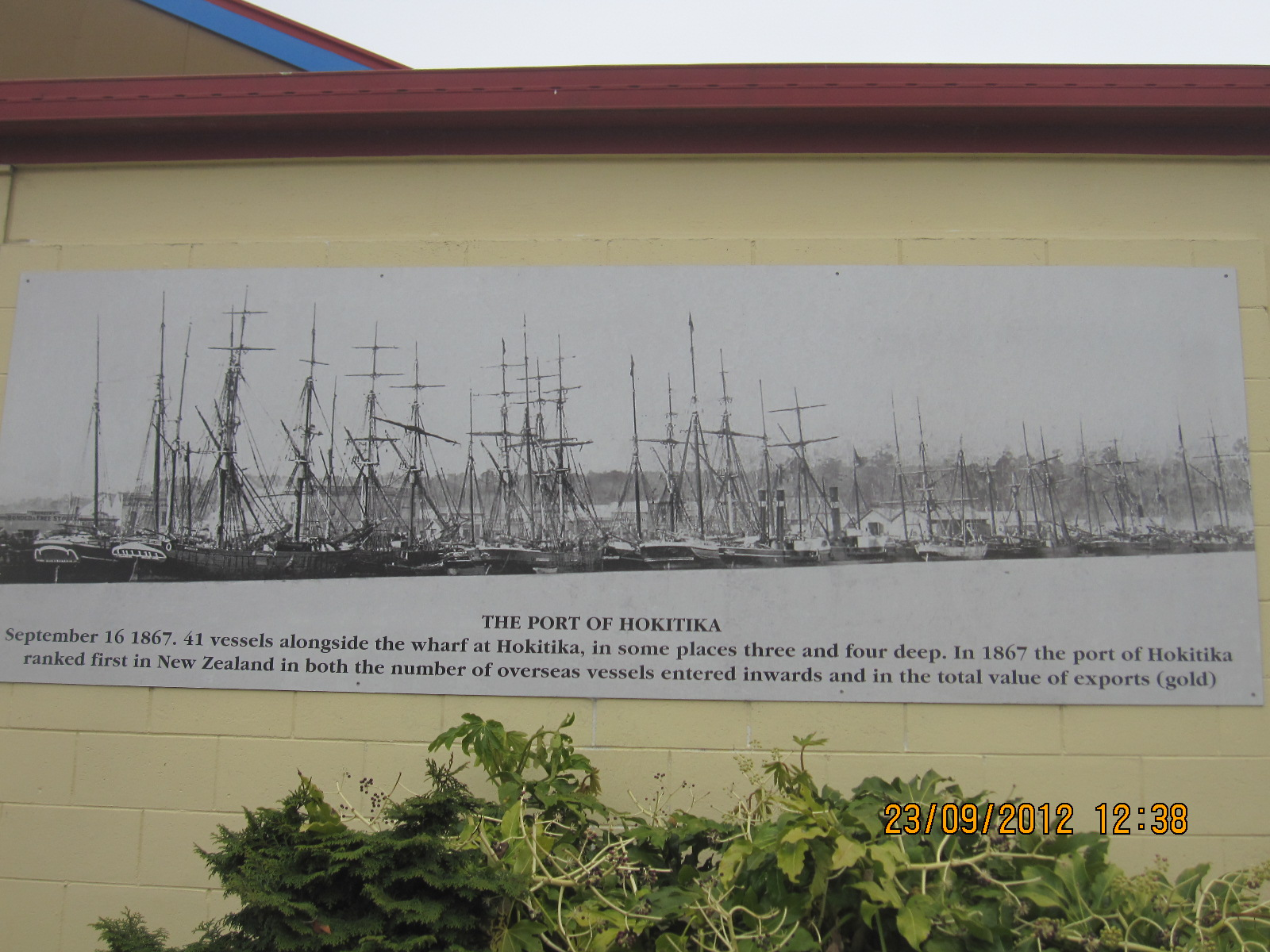
Hokitika in 1868

Her first journey was an excursion for guests of the owners from Port Chalmers to Otago Heads on 5 December 1863. Her first commercial voyage was the following week, sailing from Port Chalmers at 1pm on Wednesday, 9 December. She stopped at Waikouaiti, Moeraki, Oamaru, Timaru, and Akaroa before arriving at Lyttelton on 12 December. She left Lyttelton on 16 December and arrived back at Port Chalmers on the 20th. The proposal was for this to be a prelude to a weekly service between these ports in conjunction with the Geelong.

By May 1864 she had sailed to Wellington and was regularly sailing to Havelock and Picton. In early 1865 she began calling at Wellington and Nelson. With the West Coast gold rush, Hokitika was added to her ports of call by April.

== Disappearance ==
=== Sightings ===
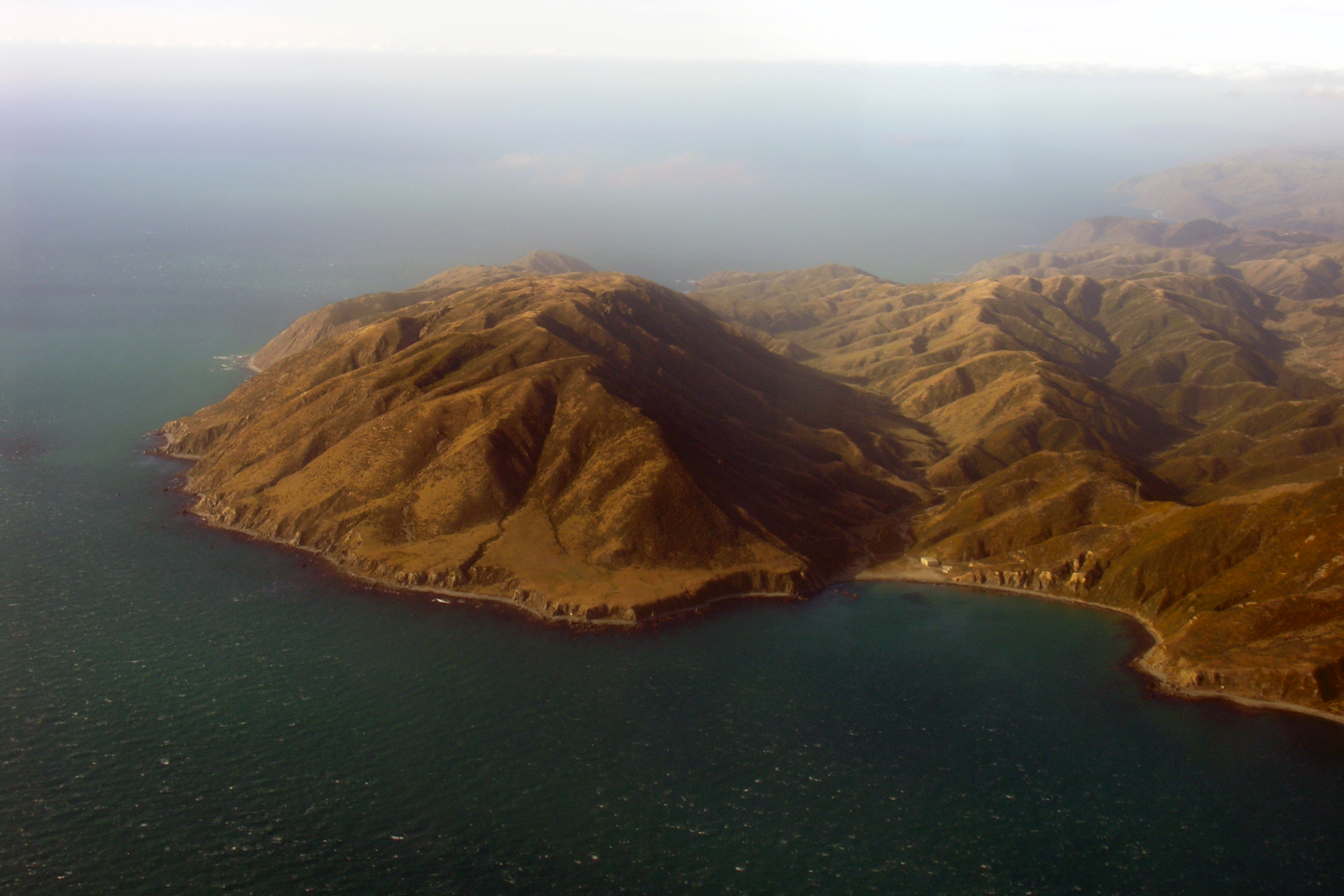
Cape Terawhiti

The City of Dunedin sailed from Wellington at about 4pm on Saturday 20 May 1865. She was sighted later that afternoon by a 15-year-old girl, Miss McMenamen while she was out horse riding at Cape Terawhiti, close in shore among the rocks. She thought the steamer had lost its steering as it was sailing in circles. The crew appeared to be confused, raising and lowering the sails. On returning home she asked her mother to come and look, but as her mother was busy she did not go. The wind on that day was reported as a fresh south-easterly. Later accounts refer to there having been a storm on the 20th and 21st.

=== Search ===
When the City of Dunedin failed to arrive in Nelson she was initially thought to be delayed or to have sailed straight to Hokitika. As time went on and debris was found along the Wellington coast, she was considered to have hit one of the rocks near the Cape and sunk.

The gunboat Sandfly under Captain Fox carried out a search of the shores on both sides of the strait.

A search on foot of the coast from Lyall Bay to Ohariu Bay was carried out by J. W. Rayer to ascertain the ship's fate. Various pieces of the ship and its contents were found strewn along the coast. The majority of the relics of the wreck were found between the Pilot Station and Sinclair Head.

Estimates of the actual number of passengers ranged from 250 to 600 in some papers published 20 to 40 years after the event. She had the capacity to carry similar numbers, as on her initial excursion to Otago Heads in 1863 she had about 500 on board. Newspapers at the time the ship went missing referred to 50 to 60 people on board. Despite searches of the coastline where she was believed to have foundered, no bodies were found.

=== Fund for orphans and widows ===
Fund raising was undertaken at various parts of the country to assist those who had lost family members.
