= Assaye (ship) =

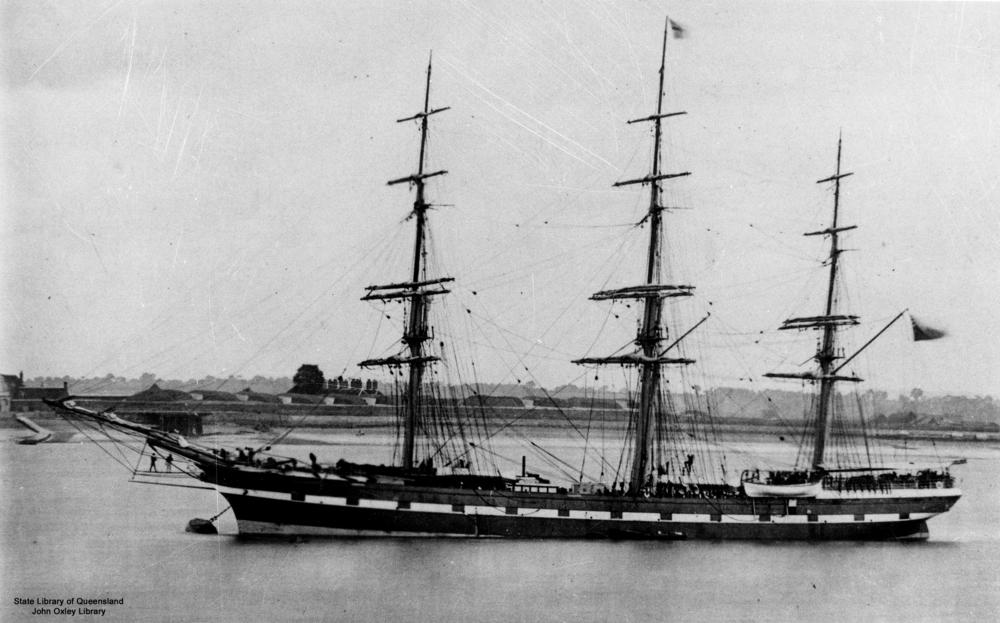
- The barque Assaye

History
- Owner: J and W Stewart
- Builder: Robert Steele and Co.
- Launched: 6 August 1868
- Completed: 1868
- Fate: Lost 1890

General characteristics
- Type: Barque
- Tonnage: 1,351 tons
- Length: 227.4 ft (69.3 m)
- Beam: 35.9 ft (10.9 m)
- Depth: 22 ft (6.7 m)

Assaye was a barque that was lost with all 25 hands on a voyage from London to Wellington, New Zealand in 1890.

== Description ==
Assaye was a 1,351-ton iron, sail-powered barque built in 1868 for J and W Stewart of Greenock by Robert Steele and Co. She was 227.4 feet (69.3 m) long by 35.9 feet (10.9 m) wide. Her hold was 22 feet (6.7 m) deep. She was launched on 6 August and replaced her namesake which was lost in June 1867 between London and Tinadad. She was sister ship to Parsee and was intended for the East India and China trade. George Hughes, previously of Tamerlane was to be her captain. Her official number was 62,060.

== Voyages ==
Her maiden voyage was to Calcutta via Liverpool on 1 September 1868. At Liverpool the captain, much to his annoyance, was fined 20 shillings for bringing gunpowder into port in breach of the port's regulations. In 1869 McRitchie became the captain.

She made one voyage to New Zealand arriving on 26 December 1874 under McRitchie bringing 419 settlers under the Vogel scheme. She had been chartered by the New Zealand Shipping Company. Her voyage had been slow and uneventful because of light winds. She left New Zealand on 27 January 1875.

== Final voyage ==
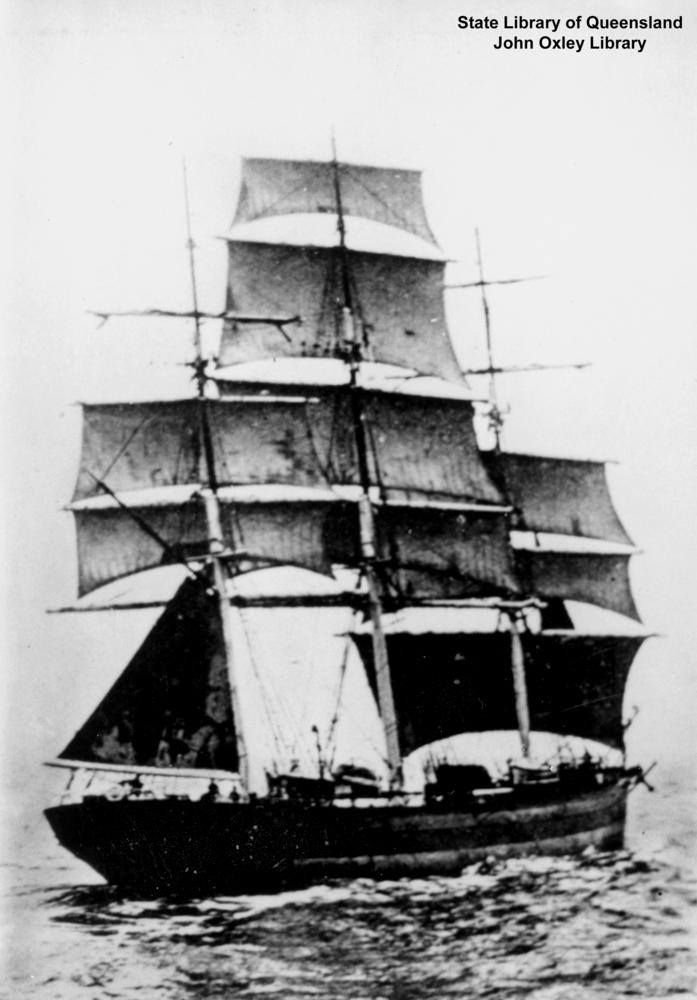
Angerona

Chatham Islands

On 19 February 1890, she sailed from London for Wellington under a Shaw, Saville, and Albion line charter with a crew of 25 Scottish seamen.

On 16 March, she was spoken to near the equator by Angerona and was never heard from again. She was expected in New Zealand by May but never arrived. Concerns about her fate began to be raised in late June, Angerona having arrived about a month earlier. By 11 July a Wellington newspaper was calling for a search of the outlying islands to be mounted. Lloyd's posted her as missing in late August, allowing insurance claims to be made.

In mid-August some wreckage was found on the Chatham Islands of Matorahan and Pitt. None of the articles found appeared to have been in the water any length of time. The Chatham Islanders suggested that the ship may have hit a nearby reef or sunk near the Auckland Islands. Captain McAllister of Kahu, who brought the news of the wreckage thought that the Auckland Island hypothesis was unlikely. A further suggestion was that she may have come to grief on the Snares or Traps as the normal route would have taken her between them and Stewart Island before she turned to run up the eastern coast of the South Island, some 800 miles south of the Chathams. Again, how the wreckage came to be at the Chathams was a mystery. The Government ship Hinemoa was on a scheduled visit to these island groups which included searching for any castaways. More items were found at the Chathams over the following months, in particular around the area of Weston Reef and the Horns. The conclusion was that the ship had met its demise in this vicinity.

Assaye was carrying some 2,000 tons of cargo, which included the library of Sir Walter Buller.

In February 1891 a story surfaced that one of the islanders had seen signal rockets in August. Mr Shand, a resident of the island, investigated the story and concluded it was true. How the Assaye had ended up at the Chathams remained a mystery as they were well off its expected course. In April Captain Fairchild of the Hinemoa carried out a more thorough investigation, including interviewing the islander who had seen the rockets and those with him at the time. From this discussion he found that there was a plausible alternative explanation. Also, as the sea was reasonably calm at the time of the sighting a wreck was unlikely. He also ascertained that the wreckage from the Assaye had been found at numerous locations around the Chathams. Based on this and that at one time timber from Bluff had been carried by the currents to the Chathams he concluded that the more probable location of the Assaye's demise was the Snares.

== Insurance ==
A Lloyd's broker who had obtained insurances with the Lloyd's underwriters absconded with the insurance money, with the claimants seeking redress from Lloyd's.
