= SS Wairarapa =

New Zealand ship

Coordinates: 36.0674°S 175.3519°E

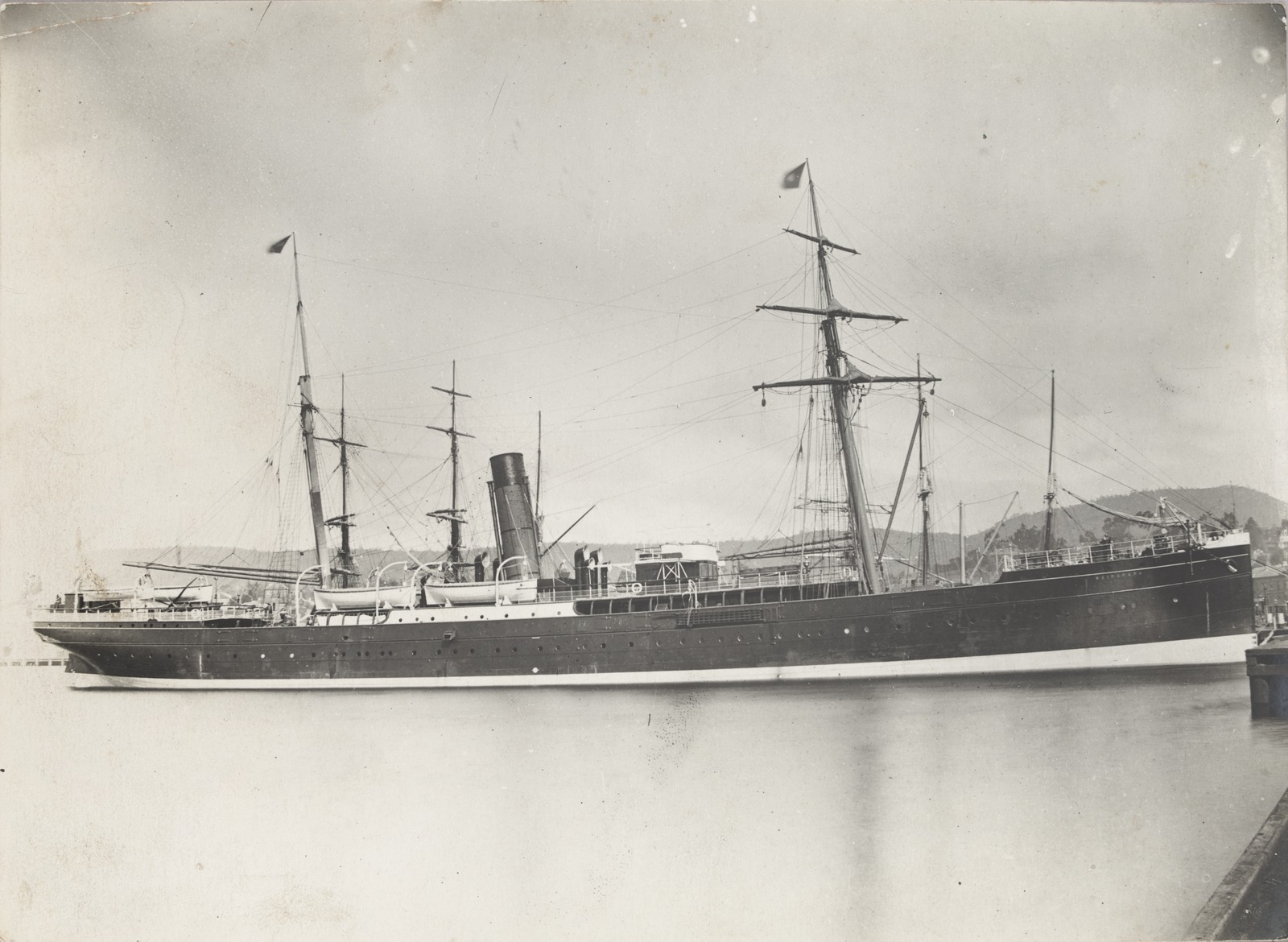
- Wairarapa

History

New Zealand
- Name: Wairarapa
- Namesake: Wairarapa
- Owner: Union Steam Ship Company
- Operator: Union Steam Ship Company
- Port of registry: Dunedin
- Route: Sydney – Auckland
- Builder: Wm Denny & Bros, Dumbarton
- Yard number: 259
- Launched: 19 May 1882
- Completed: 3 July 1882
- Out of service: 29 October 1894
- Identification: UK official number 84478; code letters WLSG
- Fate: Wrecked off Miners Head

General characteristics
- Type: Steel screw steamship
- Tonnage: 1,786 GRT, 1,023 NRT
- Length: 285.2 ft (86.9 m)
- Beam: 36.3 ft (11.1 m)
- Depth: 23.7 ft (7.2 m)
- Installed power: 2-cylinder compound engine
- Propulsion: single screw
- Sail plan: brigantine
- Speed: 14 knots (26 km/h)

SS Wairarapa was a New Zealand ship of the late 19th century plying the route between Auckland, New Zealand and Australia. It was wrecked on a reef at the northern edge of Great Barrier Island, about 100 kilometres (54 nmi) out from Auckland, and sank. The death toll of around 130 people remains one of the largest such losses in the country's history. The ship was named after the Wairarapa region.

== History ==
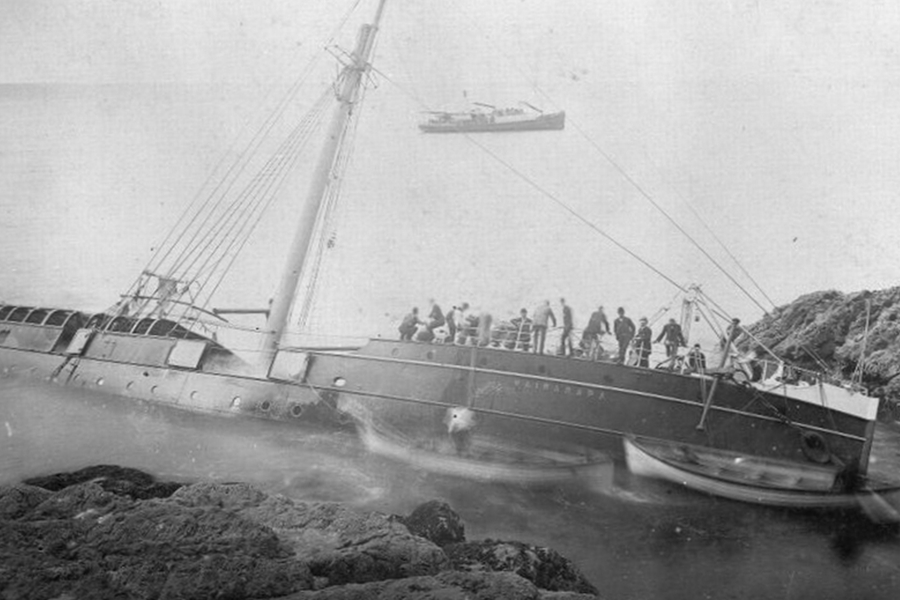
The wreck of Wairarapa some days after the accident.

Wairarapa was built in Dumbarton, Scotland, in 1882, for the Union Steam Ship Company. Soon after launch she sailed to New Zealand, to become one of a small number of luxury steamships plying the route across the Tasman Sea to Australia.

== Loss ==
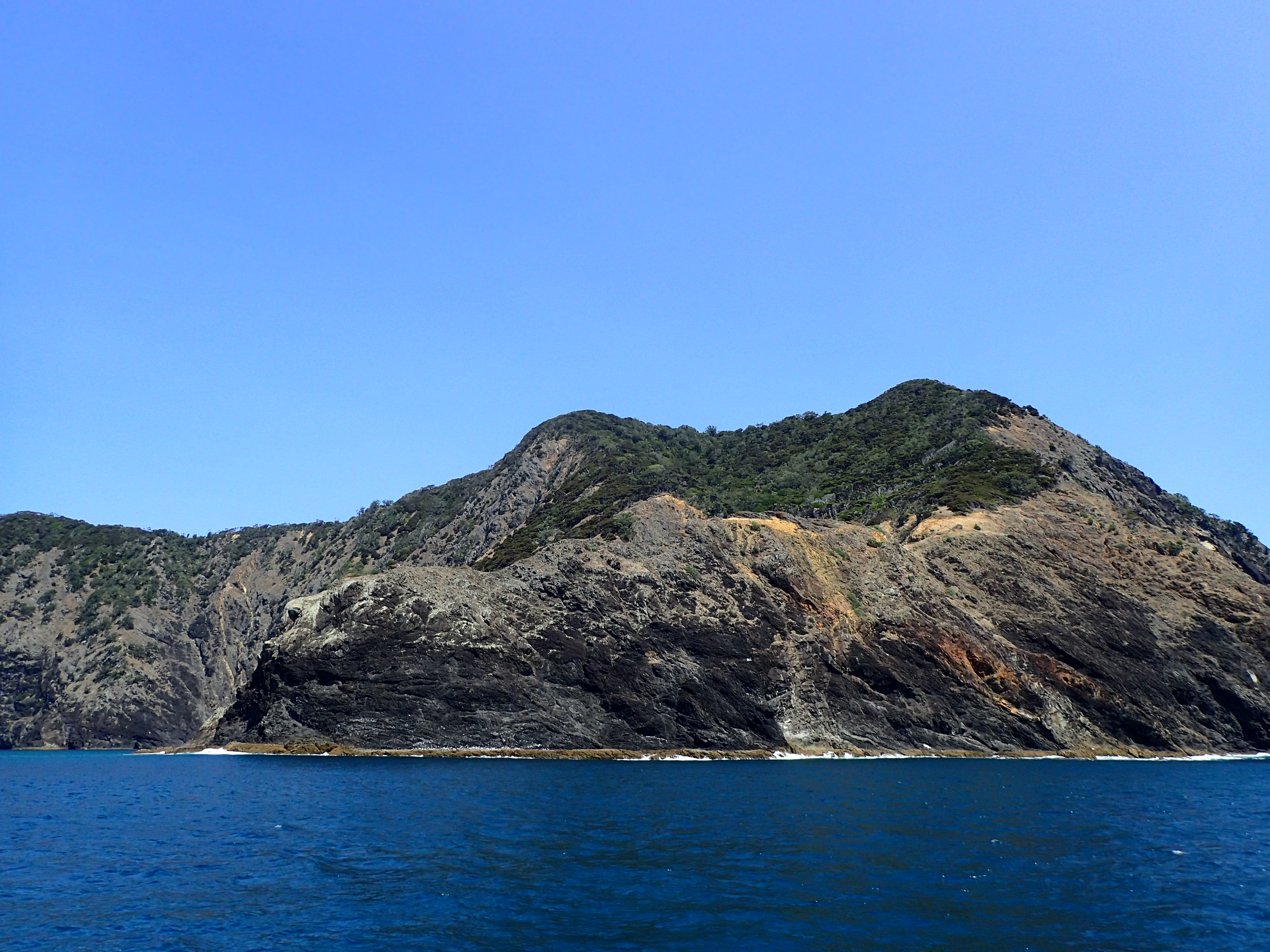
Miners Head Great Barrier Island / Aotea, where Wairarapa sank

Wairarapa sailed from Sydney, Australia, on Wednesday, 24 October 1894. The ship's destination was the rapidly growing New Zealand port city of Auckland, 2,000 miles away. As Wairarapa rounded the top of the North Island of New Zealand four days later, fog and storms set in. However, Captain John S. McIntosh refused to slow the ship from 13 knots, nearly full speed despite the thick fog. Fatally, the ship went off-course, possibly due to a faulty compass bearing. At the subsequent Court of Enquiry into the incident, some even suggested the ship had been steered by dead reckoning rather than using a compass at all. Whatever the cause, the ship skirted to the west of the Poor Knights Islands, not the east. As a consequence she was much closer to the mainland than the ship's crew believed.

At around 8 minutes past midnight on Monday, 29 October 1894, the ship was wrecked on the steep cliffs near Miners Head on the northern tip of Great Barrier Island, off the coast of Auckland.

The hours after the wreck saw great loss of life. Many passengers could not swim and drowned in the rough seas trying to make it to shore. One life raft was seen floating out to sea and was never sighted again. Many men, including a large portion of the crew, took to one of the lifeboats, leaving women and children behind. A number of people took refuge in the ship's rigging. At about 3 am Captain McIntosh jumped into the sea and was presumed drowned. Several other lifeboats which had been safely launched stayed near the stricken ship and picked survivors from the sea where possible.

One lifeboat eventually succeeded in reaching a local community of Ngati Wai Māori based at Katherine Bay, on the western coast of the island. They were able to rescue and provide care for a number of the survivors. Seaman, fisherman and farmer Mariano Vella and his new wife belonged to the survivors of the disaster. Those who lost their lives included Hephezibah Waterhouse, wife of Australian educator John Waterhouse and mother of Australian agricultural scientist Walter Waterhouse, as well as her infant daughter.

Although Wairarapa was expected in Auckland, there was no way of knowing where she may have come to grief. As the only contact with the island at the time was via weekly trips from a steamer, it was three full days until news of the shipwreck reached Auckland.

The Northern Company's steamship Argyle arrived in Port FitzRoy on Wednesday, 31 October, and took the survivors who had reached Port FitzRoy on board. The steamships then went to the site of the shipwreck, and to Katherine Bay, picking up further survivors and sailing back to arrive in Auckland about 3am Thursday 1 November.

A Court of Inquiry was held after Wairarapa disaster, and found Captain McIntosh's actions were the primary cause of the tragedy.

== Protection ==
The wreck of Wairarapa is scheduled for preservation in the Auckland Unitary Plan and is also protected under the archaeological provisions of the Heritage New Zealand Pouhere Taonga Act 2014.
