= New Zealand National Airways Corporation Flight 441 =

1963 aviation accident

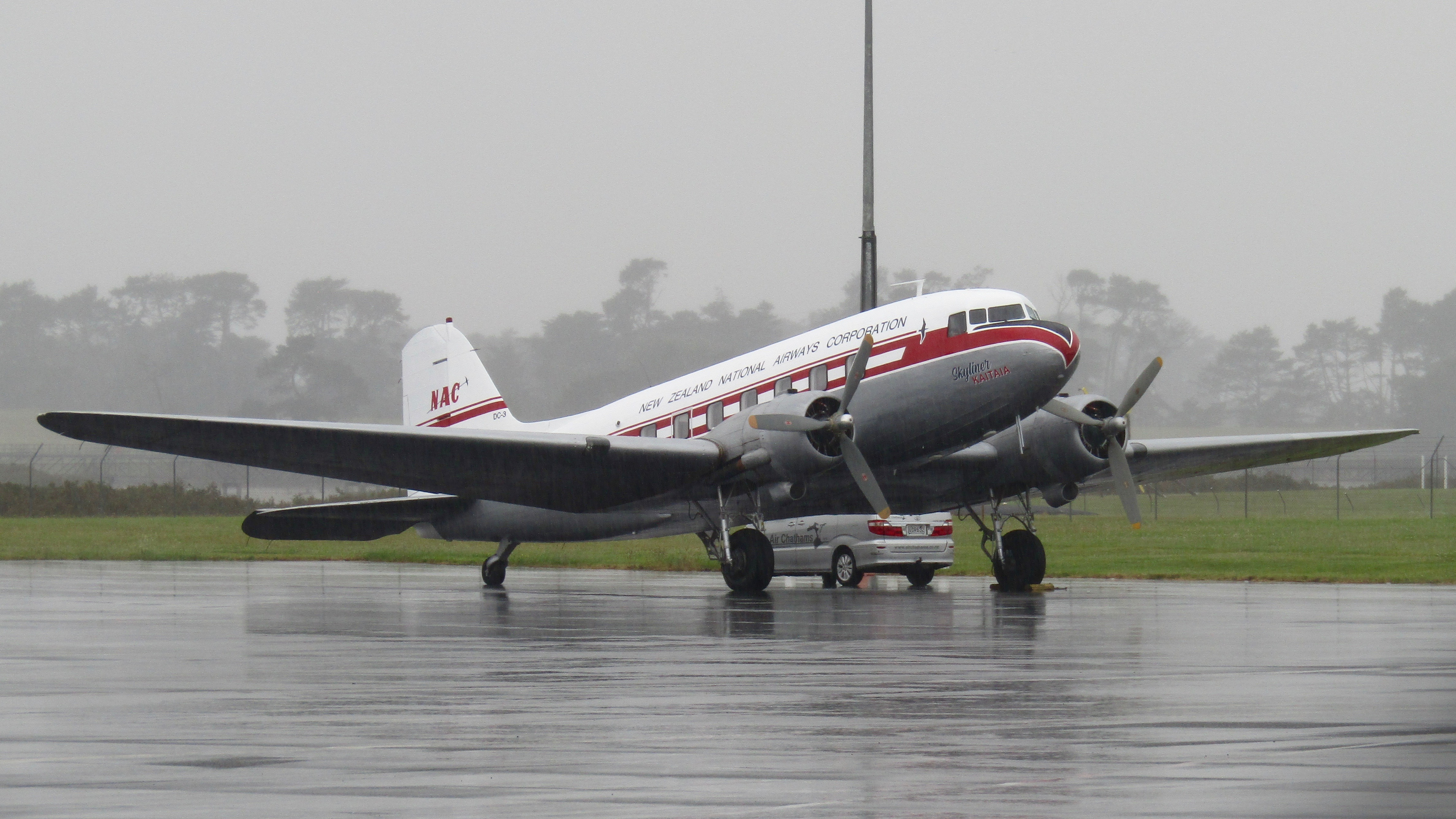
- A DC-3 similar to the accident aircraft

Accident
- Date: 3 July 1963
- Summary: Controlled flight into terrain
- Site: Near Mount Ngatamahinerua, Kaimai Ranges, New Zealand

Aircraft
- Aircraft type: Douglas DC-3C (C-47B-15-DK)
- Aircraft name: Hastings
- Operator: National Airways Corporation
- Registration: ZK-AYZ
- Flight origin: Auckland Whenuapai Airport
- Destination: Tauranga Airport
- Passengers: 20
- Crew: 3
- Fatalities: 23
- Survivors: 0

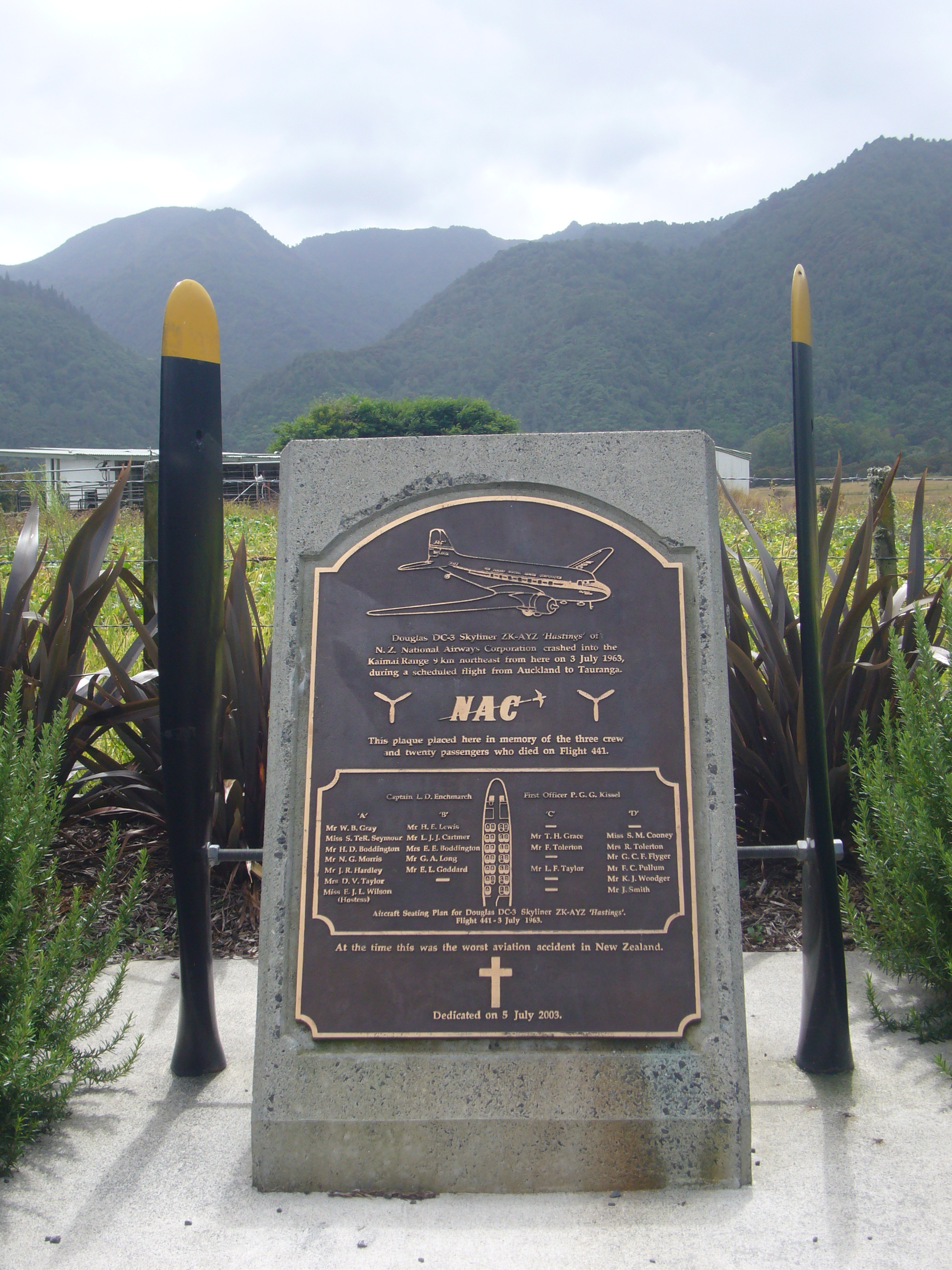
A memorial to those who died in the accident. The Kaimai Ranges are seen behind the memorial

New Zealand National Airways Corporation Flight 441 (NZ441) was a scheduled flight of the New Zealand National Airways Corporation from Whenuapai, Auckland to Tauranga. On 3 July 1963 at approximately 9:09 am NZST, the flight, a Douglas DC-3 Skyliner, flew into a vertical rock face in the Kaimai Ranges near Mount Ngatamahinerua, at an altitude of 2460 feet (750 m). Twenty-three people were on board. Twenty-two were killed instantly; there is evidence that one person survived the impact but died shortly afterward. Three extra passengers were supposed to be on the flight, but changed their plans at the last minute.

== Investigation ==
According to Civil Aviation Authority investigators, a downdraft carried the aircraft below the level of the crests of the range, where under the very poor weather conditions prevailing at the time, the aircraft encountered an area of extreme turbulence from which it was impossible for the crew to recover altitude. On the day of the crash, another plane was caught in strong downdrafts in the Kaimai Ranges but managed to recover. Furthermore, the crew was probably unaware of the true position of the aircraft and initiated a premature descent. However, it must be appreciated that the crew decided to descend only to the level officially designated as the minimum safe altitude in the area of the descent.

== Aftermath ==
Following this accident, the Civil Aviation Authority made the decision to classify the Kaimai Ranges as mountainous terrain, which raised the minimum safe altitude for the area by 1000 feet (305 m).

Due to the remoteness of the crash, the wreckage was not recovered but secured on site by the New Zealand Army in 1964. This is similar to New Zealand's other major air disaster, Air New Zealand Flight 901, which remains on the slopes of Mount Erebus in Antarctica where it crashed. In June 2023, however, one engine and the rear tyre were recovered. In July 2023, the recovered wreckage was included in a display at Classic Flyers Museum near Tauranga Airport, commemorating the 60th anniversary of the crash.
