= Clyde (1874 ship) =

Clyde was a wooden barque of 562 tons net register. It was built in Australia in 1874, and was wrecked near Banks Peninsula, New Zealand, on 6 November 1884.

== Construction ==
Clyde was built in Australia in 1874, and registered in Newcastle, New South Wales. The owner was a Mr J. C. Ellis.

== Final voyage and wreck ==
On 6 November 1884, Clyde sailed from Dunedin en route to Lyttelton with a part cargo of sugar from Mauritius. As the vessel neared the South Akaroa Heads, conditions were foggy and the ship struck a reef at Snuffle Nose, Horseshoe Bay.

Clyde was completely broken up, and sank with the loss of 17 lives (all but one of the crew on board).

The wreck of Clyde lies in 18 to 22 m of water close to the reef, with strong currents and low visibility making it a dangerous dive site.
