= Anchor Shipping and Foundry Company =

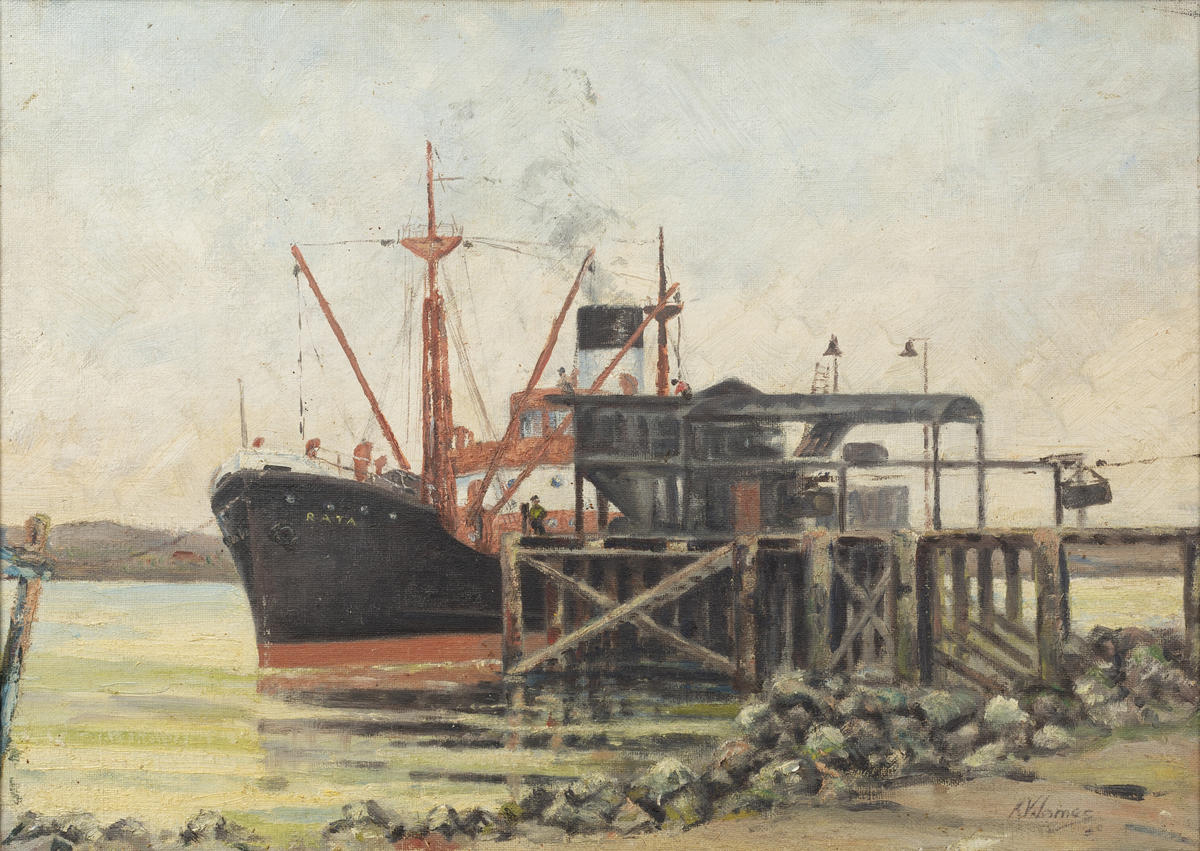
- George Sherriff – Rata Ship on the Whanganui River – Sarjeant Gallery
- Industry: Transport
- Founded: 1870
- Defunct: 1984
- Successor: Union Company
- Headquarters: Nelson
- Products: Sea transport

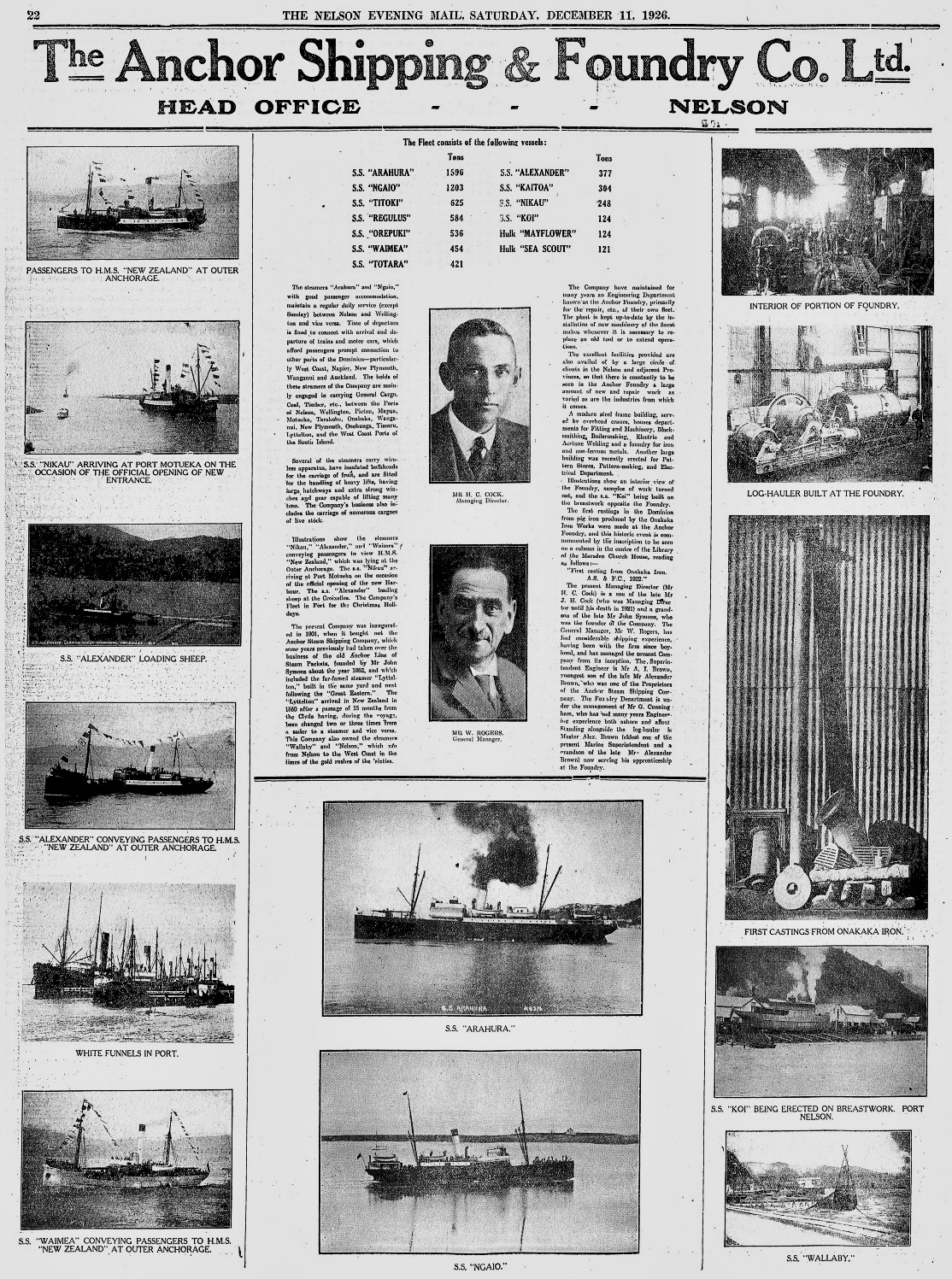
Anchor Shipping and Foundry 1926 advertorial

The Anchor Shipping and Foundry Company linked Nelson with other parts of New Zealand from 1870 to March 1982, when Titoki was sold. The company's former office remains on the quay at Nelson, as do steps of their foundry, which built one of their ships, repaired their fleet and made other machinery.

== Nathaniel Edwards and Company 1862–1870 ==
Anchor had its origins on 5 February 1857, when Nathaniel Edwards and George Bennett formed a partnership as Nathaniel Edwards and Company, to take over the Nelson merchants, Alfred Fell & Co. By 1860 they had become shipping agents. On 3 November 1862 another merchant, John Symons, joined N. Edwards & Co., which had just bought the paddle steamer Lyttelton in October 1862. She replaced the Tasmanian Maid, when on 11 November 1862 she made her first voyage from Nelson to Blenheim, being the first steamship to reach Blenheim town wharf, on the Ōpaoa River. Alexander Brown, her engineer, also joined the company. Lyttelton served Tasman and Golden Bay / Mohua ports, with occasional trips to Wellington. Paddle steamer Charles Edward was bought in 1863. In December 1864, at the start of the West Coast gold rush, Wallabi was bought from Australia, to serve Westport, Greymouth and Hokitika. In 1865 Kennedy also came from Australia, adding occasional trips to Taranaki for cattle. Paddle steamer Nelson was added in 1866. In 1866 Edwards sold his shares to his partners, though he retained the shipping department. A workshop near N. Edwards & Co bulk store at Matangi Awhio/ Auckland Point was created.

== Anchor Line of Steam Packets 1870–1974 ==
By 1870 John Symons had become the sole owner of both the merchant and shipping departments of Nathaniel Edwards & Co and, in August 1870, changed the name of the latter to Anchor Line of Steam Packets, with a new pennant, featuring an anchor, designed by artist, William Cock.

Symons retired in 1878. In December 1880 a partnership was formed under the name Anchor Steam Shipping Company which purchased Anchor's 5 ships, the foundry and Albion Wharf. Forming the partnership were John H Cock & Company (⅓), Sclanders and Company (⅓), P Donald (1/6), and Alexander Brown (1/6). During the 1880s economic depression the foundry remained profitable and Anchor ships continued to serve Nelson, Wellington, New Plymouth, Whanganui, Foxton, Pātea, Onehunga and West Coast ports, with trips to Jackson Bay and the Marlborough Sounds on occasions.

=== Alexander Brown and family ===
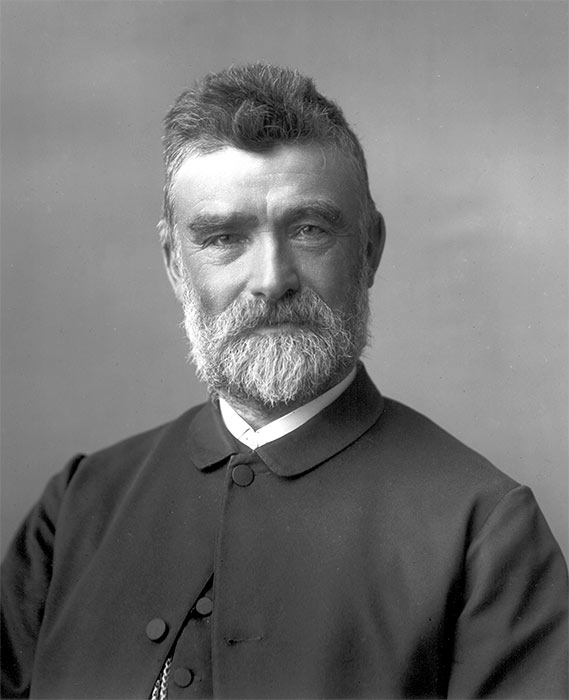
Alexander Brown

Alexander Brown was born at Larkhall, Scotland, probably on 23 February 1830, to Ellen Graham and Thomas Brown, a blacksmith. From 1846 to 1854 he was an apprentice and then engineer at James Gray & Company shipyard. In 1855 he joined Scott Russell's shipyard at Millwall, as an engineer building the Great Eastern. In 1855 he went to the Crimea as 2nd engineer of the transport Pioneer, but returned to Millwall for the launch of the Great Eastern in 1858. He helped build the Lyttelton and steamed with her to New Zealand, leaving England on 18 August 1859; it was intended that he remain in the colony for a year to fit out and then work on her. The wages offered were very attractive: £10 a month for the journey and £20 a month while in New Zealand. On arrival Alexander Brown refitted the Lyttelton as a paddle-steamer, visiting Lyttelton and then Dunedin. During the 1861 goldrush, she took passengers from Dunedin to Taieri. N Edwards & Co purchased the ship in 1862 and used it to trade between Nelson and Blenheim. Brown joined the new owners as chief engineer. In 1866 he accepted a shore appointment in Nelson to supervise repairs and alterations to the company's ships, the start of Anchor Foundry. In 1873 the foundry moved to a new port site. He was also engineer on the Wallabi and Kennedy until 1866. In 1880 Alexander Brown became a major shareholder in the Anchor Steam Shipping Co, which purchased the shipping and foundry assets from the estate of John Symonds. Brown continued as the Anchor Foundry Manager and in 1901 was appointed a Director and Consulting Engineer to the Anchor Shipping & Foundry Company. He visited the foundry daily until a few weeks before his death. His wife, Isabella Brown, died on 9 October 1904. They married in Nelson on 3 August 1868. Although his obituaries, published on 25 January 1913, say he died the day before, following a period of ill health, his death certificate says he died on 22 January. His children were Thomas, John, Irvine, Mrs R. Ward, of Christchurch and Agnes Isabella Ambridge (died 3 July 1943).

His sons and grandsons were apprentices at the Anchor Foundry before qualifying as chief engineers. His eldest son, Thomas, was Foundry Manager from 1901 to 1921 and a company director until he died on 26 May 1943. Thomas Brown, a director of the Anchor Shipping and Foundry Co. Ltd, died at his home in Richardson street on 26 May 1943, aged 72. He was the eldest son of Alexander Brown and served his engineering apprenticeship in the Anchor foundry and then proceeded to England for further experience. For some years he was an engineer in the service of the Union Steam Ship Company, prior to succeeding his father as manager of the Anchor Company's foundry. He retired from that position in 1920 and then acted as consulting engineer to the company. In 1922 and again in 1926, in company with Mrs Brown, he visited England on the company's business. In 1922 he superintended the construction of the steamer Titoki on the Clyde, and when returning to New Zealand in 1926 he was a passenger on Aorangi on its maiden voyage. The late Mr Brown was appointed a director of Anchor when it became a limited liability company in March 1901 and he retained that position until his death. He married Helen McRitchie Simpson, who survives him.

John (Jack) Brown was an apprentice in the foundry and until he went to Glasgow for further training. He was 2nd Engineer on the Union's liner Moana on the Sydney-San Francisco service, until he returned, to Anchor as Chief Engineer for several years, including superintending construction of Alexander in 1902, the first Anchor steamer built in Britain, followed by Waimea, Nikau and Kaitoa in 1909. Mr Brown on this occasion came out as Chief Engineer of the Kaitoa and on arrival here was transferred to the Waimea as Chief Engineer, continuing in that vessel until his retirement from the sea to work in the Foundry. He was a seagoing engineer and Assistant Foundry Manager from 1912 to 1915 when he retired for health reasons. John Wilson Brown, aged 59, died suddenly at 5am on 4 December 1930 at his home, Lark Hall, Richardson Street, Nelson. He was the second son of Alexander Brown and was educated as a marine engineer for Union. For a time he was a manager of Anchor. He was an invalid for several years. He left a widow and 4 daughters—Mrs W. J. Thompson, Mrs L. W. Field, Isabel and Eileen Brown. His sisters Mrs R. B. Ward, of Christchurch, and Mrs Andridge, of Rarotonga survived him.

Alexander Irvine Brown was a seagoing engineer and Superintending Engineer from 1915 until 1944. He remained a Director until his death in 1962. In 1929 their son Alex left Nelson to serve as engineer on various ships. In 1941 their second son, Ivan Graeme, married Joan Mabel Wallace, of Takapuna. In 1937 their daughter, Phyllis Maud, married Harold John Addis, of Auckland.

Thomas Alexander (Alex) Brown, the eldest son of Alexander Brown, like his father and uncles was an engineering apprentice at the Foundry, and was a seagoing engineer until his appointment as Assistant Superintending Engineer in 1938. He remained in this position until his death in 1963.

=== Anchor Shipping & Foundry Company 1900–1972 ===
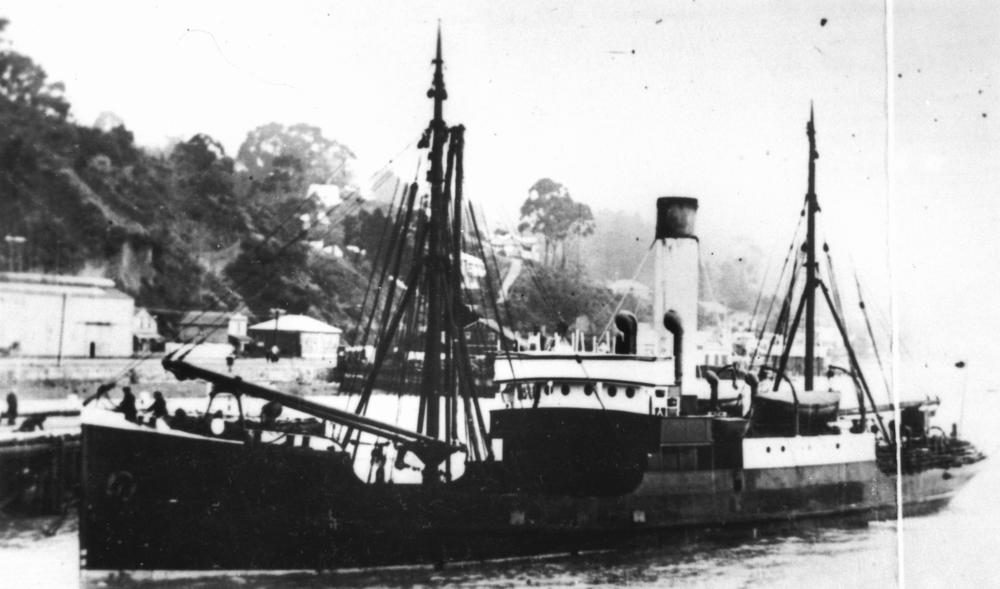
Regulus 1913–1935

In 1900 the partnership was replaced by Anchor Shipping & Foundry Company, the main shareholders being John H Cock's son, Joseph Henry Cock, Alexander Brown and his 3 sons, A H Turnbull, and David Sclanders of London. By 1907 there was demand for a nightly passenger/cargo service between Wellington Nelson-Motueka, and a number of vessels were employed, the first being the Tasman, then Nikau and Kaitoa. Union said that, due to the extension of South Island railways, it was arranged on a friendly basis that Anchor would operate the Wellington-Nelson service and Union the Wellington-Picton service. In 1908 Union bought a 50% share in Anchor, using nominees to avoid publicity. From 1921 on, there was friendly co-operation with Union. In 1916 Anchor ran 6 days a week, serving Nelson, Motueka, and Wellington with the twin-screw steamers, Waverley 157 tons, Koi 136 tons, Nikau and Kaitoa 304 tons. In 1925 the Arahura was purchased from Union for the daily service until she was replaced by an Australian built vessel Mourilyan renamed Matangi in 1929. In the 1930s and 40s Matangi left Wellington Queens Wharf No.16 at 7.30pm on Monday, Wednesday and Friday nights and Arahura on Tuesdays, Thursdays and Saturdays, a service begun in August 1909. Puriri was delivered in 1939, but, as a minesweeper, struck a mine in the Hauraki Gulf in May 1941 and sank. She was replaced after the war with a larger Puriri and shortly afterwards with a sister ship, Mamaku, designed to work shallow draft ports such as Māpua and Motueka and operate the Tasman Bay-Onehunga service.

In 1949 Arahura failed her survey and was withdrawn. The 1929 Hualalai came from Honolulu in late October 1949 and was renamed Ngaio, but alterations were needed and the lighthouse tender Matai ran with Matangi until May 1950, when Ngaio made her first run to Nelson. Matangi was withdrawn in 1952 and Ngaio in 1953, when the Wellington – Nelson ferry ended, following increasing losses from 1947/48, when profit was down to £10,051. A daily cargo run continued with Matipo and Pearl Kasper Company vessels Willomee and later Konanda. Konanda was replaced by Anchor's Towai in 1966, but in 1969 the regular service stopped, due to competition from the Cook Strait rail ferries from 1962, which also affected the Onehunga service, which was taken over by Union in 1972. Puriri was sold in 1974, ending 110 years of Anchor.

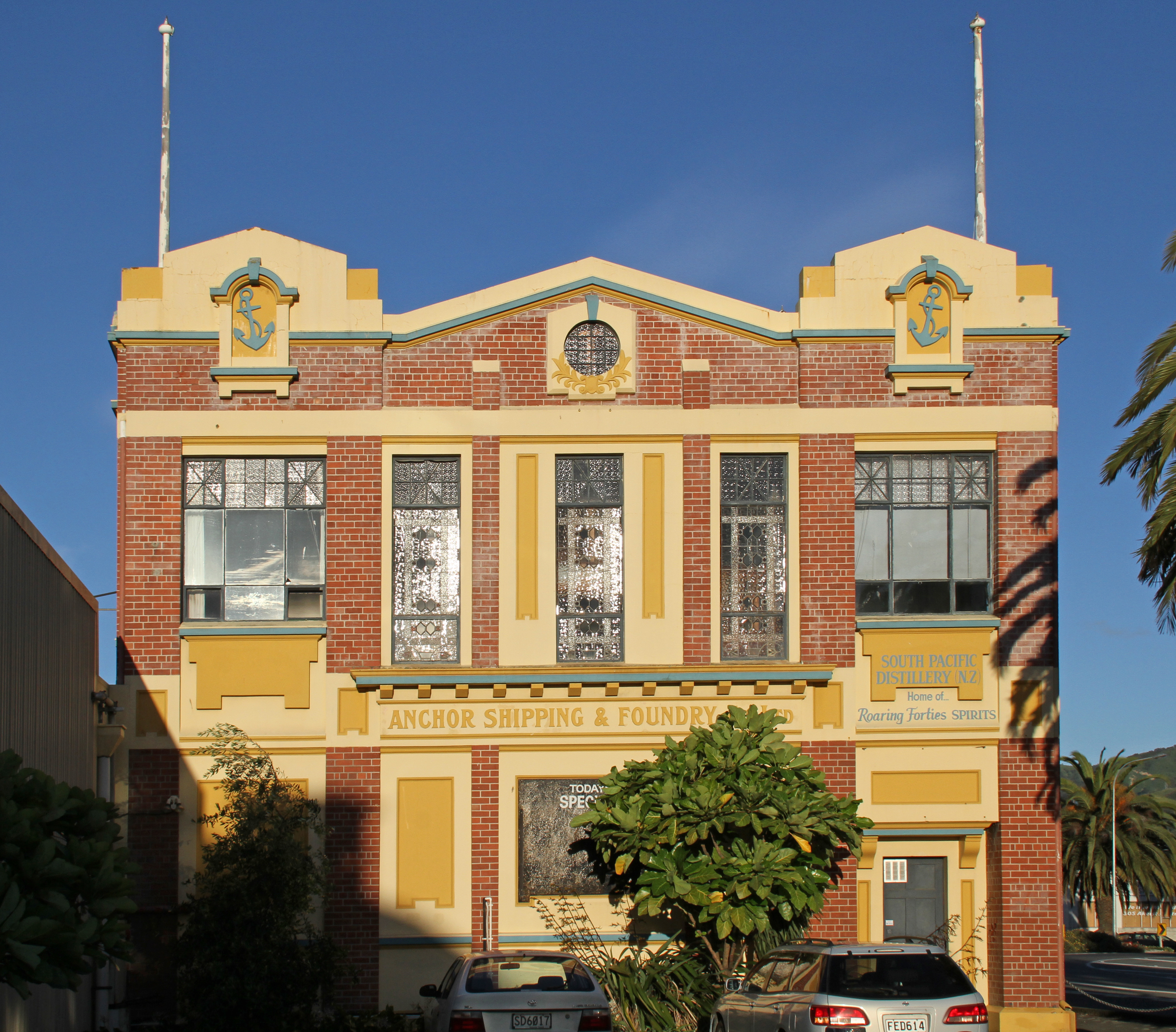
Anchor Shipping & Foundry offices were first used in March 1928

=== The Anchor Shipping and Foundry Company Building on Wakefield Quay ===
The office was built on the site of the Customhouse Hotel. The 2-storey Anchor Shipping & Foundry Co Ltd Building was designed by Arthur R. Griffin in 1927. It had a booking office, offices for managers and clerks, a strong-room, bicycle room, coke-fired central heating and steel-framed windows. The floors were covered in Rublino Tiles, a brand of linoleum. The 32 ft (9.8 m) high flat roof could be used to assess approaching weather or vessels. The Historic Places Trust listed the building as Category 2 on 11 November 1982. After Anchor closed, the offices were used by printers and a distillery, before being bought for $1m by Nelson City Council in September 2013. In 2014 the building was assessed as earthquake-prone, with a rating of 22% of New Building Standard. In 2021 a notice was issued requiring seismic strengthening by 23 April 2027.

=== Decline ===
Anchor gradually succumbed to air, rail and road competition.

A daily freight service was maintained between the two ports in conjunction with Pearl Kasper Shipping Co's Konanda and (from 1955) Anchor's Matipo. Due to the rapid development of air transport after the War, it was decided to acquire only the Ngaio. Matangi was immediately withdrawn for survey. This she failed and she was promptly laid up in Shelley Bay for disposal. Her former consort in the service, Arahura, had failed her survey a year earlier. Coal from the West Coast had always figured large in Anchor's operation and in 1947 placed an order with Henry Robb Ltd. for a twin-screw motor ship which became Puriri (1,248grt). Although fitted with a full outfit of cargo gear including a jumbo derrick capable of lifting 20 tons, she was in effect a small collier. Launched on 22 July 1948, she sailed to New Zealand via Australia and arrived in Wellington on 8 January 1949 with 800 tons of Newcastle coal. Much of her life was spent carrying bulk cargoes around the coast, although she did carry general cargo and timber from time to time. Her final years of service saw her engaged full time on the company's Nelson – Onehunga route carrying general cargo and she was sold out of the fleet in 1974. to the requirements of smaller ports such as Mapua and Motueka especially in regard to length and draught. Launched on 28 July 1949 as Mamaku, she sailed from Leith on 15 October 1949 for Middlesbrough where she loaded a cargo of coke for Auckland, arriving there on 23 December. Mamaku spent most of her life in the general cargo trade between Nelson, Motueka and Onehunga, although she also shipped coal from the West Coast to North Island ports on occasion. After giving good service to the company, she was sold in 1972 for further trading.

From 1972, management of the fleet was in the hands of Union and in December 1973 the company name was changed to Anchor-Dorman Ltd. to incorporate the interests of Dorman Engineering Co. Ltd. of Nelson, which Union had acquired in 1969. In the early 1980s, Union decided that the Nelson-Onehunga trade should be containerised and the original intention was to give the new ship a traditional Anchor name and operate in their colours. This was not to be and the new ship arrived as Union Nelson in March 1982 with full Union Company colours. Titoki was withdrawn and before Union Nelson even entered service, a new crew was aboard preparing for her departure overseas. With her sale, the Anchor name disappeared forever with the shipping side of the business being renamed Union Maritime Services and the engineering interests were sold to a New Plymouth company on 31 March 1984.

Anchor had a total of 37 ships, 16 being the peak in 1930. It ran until absorbed into Union in 1972. Union Nelson ceased regular calls at Nelson in 1985, due in part to railway competition.

== Foundry ==
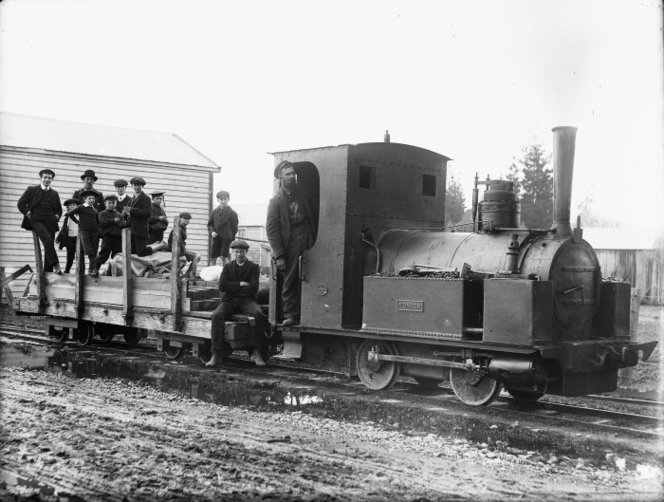
Anchor-built locomotive on the Takaka tramway

The foundry built and repaired a wide range of machinery. It operated from 1866 to 1986 and was established by N. Edwards & Co. In 1866, a workshop opened near N. Edwards & Co bulk store at Matangi Awhio/Auckland Point. A January 1873 report described the newly erected workshops on the Port road, as of corrugated iron, 125 feet long, by 25 feet wide. In the centre was a 70 ft by 25 ft, general workshop, 2 forges, shortly to be added an 8 hp steam engine, to work a 5-cwt. steam hammer, lathes, and fans for the blasts of the various furnaces. A 4 hp engine driving a boring machine and 2 lathes. At the northern end is the foundry, 25 ft x 25 ft, and furnace were being erected.

A large new workshop on Wakefield Quay, named The Anchor Foundry, was in use by 1873. By then the Anchor Foundry repaired Anchor's steamers, as well as taking on outside work, such as building other steamers, making gold sluicing equipment, cast iron stoves and a locomotive for the Takaka Tramway Company. The Foundry also served local industries such as Griffin's biscuits, Samuel Kirkpatrick's jam and canning factory and Baigent Timber, offering fitting and turning, blacksmithing, moulding and casting, boiler making, electric and acetone welding, pattern making, and electrical wiring and installation. In 1883 Anchor Steam Shipping Co. was formed with the Anchor Line ships, foundry, and shipyard. It became Anchor Shipping & Foundry Co. on 31 March 1901. Anchor Foundry at Port Nelson, erected in 1907, was a long narrow building with an exterior cladding of grey corrugated iron. It extended along the waterfront from the power house building to the then Pier Hotel. When the 1907 building was opened, the overhead drive shaft extended the full length of the building, and was reputed to be the longest single overhead drive shaft in the southern hemisphere. After World War II trade declined, partly because of competition from ferries and the declining use of coal. In 1969 Anchor bought T. Dorman Engineering. Late in 1973 Anchor was wound up by Union, when it bought the remaining 12% of Anchor from the Brown families. A new company Anchor Dorman was formed to take over Union's interest in Nelson. In 1984 Anchor Dorman was sold to Perry Dines Corporation of New Plymouth, but within two years was liquidated; even the employees received no redundancy payments. The buildings were sold to Nelson Harbour Board and the plant disposed of. The Anchor Foundry buildings on Wakefield Quay were demolished in 2005 and luxury apartments built. The steps at 15 Richardson Street remain.

== Fleet List ==
| Ship | Years | GRT | Built | Notes |
|---|---|---|---|---|
| Lyttelton | 1861-86 | 78 | Scott Russell Millwall | Lyttelton was a 49grt, 25 hp condensing, iron, ketch-rigged paddle steamer, 75 feet long, 18 feet wide, 4 ft. 6in deep. She left the Thames on 18 August 1859, via Cork, Cape de Verde and Cape Coast Castle, where the captain and many crew went down with fever. At the equator she was becalmed for several weeks, so the paddle-wheels were fitted and everything burnable was used. On reaching port ballast was sold to buy supplies of food and coal. She reached Wellington on 23 November 1860. After refitting, Alexander Brown look her to Lyttelton for the Gabriel's Gully goldrush in 1861, to link Dunedin and Taieri. In 1862 she was bought by Edwards & Co to for Nelson-Blenheim, later becoming part of Anchor. On The Beef Barrels (Kahikatoa), on the approach to French Pass, on 30 September 1886 the ship was wrecked. The captain was found not to be at fault. |
| Charles Edward | 1868-1908 | 89 or 141 | William Denny & Brothers Dumbarton | Charles Edward in Kaduku River (Hollyford River) in 1870 Charles Edward as altered in 1900 Charles Edward was a paddle steamer, launched on 9 December 1863. She was valued at £7,500 when sent from Melbourne to Hokitika by Gipps Land Lakes Steam Navigation Company for the gold rush, but stranded on Greymouth bar in 1868 and reported as wrecked and under-insured to her shareholders. An information board at Shaving Point, Metung, says she was sold in 1876, but Edwards & Co bought her for £1,000 in 1868, when Alexander Brown repaired her in just over a fortnight for about £600. Her passenger accommodation was in cabins on deck and below, she was 125 feet long, 20 feet beam, drew 6 feet, had 60 hp steeple engines, carried 120 tons and was 80 registered tons. On 28 February 1870 she hit a snag in the Hollyford River and was grounded. By 5 April she had been refloated and was able to leave the Kaduku River. In 1876 she was lengthened by 16 ft. or 12, as a schooner rigged paddle steamer. In 1881 she was holed on the rocks at Cape Foulwind and then towed to Westport. She was converted to a twin-screw vessel in 1883, which saved space and fuel and increased her speed. In 1900 she was again lengthened slightly, her hold space was enlarged and her clipper bow and figurehead of Bonnie Prince Charlie, were replaced by a raked stem. She was then registered as 145 tons, with a 48 hp compound engine. She was wrecked at Whanganui on 16 December 1908, after which she and her cargo of coal were sold for £25. Built for the Otago Steam Ship Company, she was swiftly sold to Australian interests before being the first Anchor ship to visit Onehunga on 3 September 1868, arriving with 97 gold-diggers bound for Thames. |
| Wallabi | 1864–68 | 103 | A & J Inglis Pointhouse | S. S. Wallabi aground at Greymouth in 1886 25hp condensing. Often advertised as Wallaby. Iron paddle steamer launched 15 October 1863 for T. McArthur, Sydney Length 119.6 ft Breadth 18.0 ft Draft 6.7 ft, Anchor 1864–68. In 1865 she was in the news when the Superintendent of Nelson, John Perry Robinson, was drowned whilst crossing the bar from the ship at Westport. Isaac Freith, Nelson, 1868–71, Walter Guthrie, Dunedin, 1871–74, Henry & E.P. Houghton, Dunedin, 1874–75, John Houghton, Dunedin, 1875, Geo. Y. Lethbridge & partners, Wellington, 1875–79, Wanganui Graziers S.S. Co., 1879–82, James Leys, Wanganui, 1882–84, James Leys & partners, Wanganui, 1884–86, beached Greymouth 3 July 1886, re-launched October 1886, re-registered 1887 by Thomas W. Hungerford & Andrew McKay, Greymouth, beached Evans Bay May 1891, engines removed on Coffey's slip, Clyde Quay, Te Aro August 1891, broken up June 1892. |
| Kennedy | 1865-1919 | 149 | Australian Steam Navigation Co., Pyrmont, Sydney | She was built of iron in 1864–65 for the Queensland river service, launched in January 1865 from the Patent Slip, rigged as a fore-and-aft 3-masted schooner. She was then 135 feet long, 19 feet wide, 7 feet 3 inches deep, had saloons for 12 men and 6 ladies and a fore-cabin for about 20. Twin screws were driven by two 4-cylinder, inverted, direct-action engines, totalling 43 hp, fed by a single boiler, driving her at 10 kn (19 km/h; 12 mph). With 150 tons of cargo she drew 4 feet. arrived on 7 October 1865 Originally 149 tons, she was refitted to 174 tons in 1875 (then 138.4 x 19.4 x 7.8), 189 tons in 1886, 193 tons in 1895 and 226 tons in 1904. In 1905 she was converted from a single to a two hatch vessel, by removing her passenger accommodation, and then carried coal, cattle and general cargo. Nathaniel Edwards bought her and she arrived at Nelson on 7 October 1865 with space for 31 saloon passengers and 16 steerage. Throughout her long career she retained her sails. Edwards used her on the Nelson-Hokitika route. On 25 October 1867 a Mōkihinui River flood washed her out into a rough sea with insufficient steam to run the engines. On 11 July 1869 she was stuck on Hokitika bar, unable to leave until 29 July. She was sent on an 8-day trip to Sydney for repair and didn't return until October. In 1883 she collided with Tui at Whanganui, in 1898 with Felicity at Motueka, in 1899 with Dingadee, in 1900 with Taieri at Buller and in 1918 was on Westport Bar, after her coal feed pipe was swept away and the boilers were short on fuel. She got across the bar, but was swept out to sea, until port was made, with an engine room half full of water and injuries to the mate, second engineer and a sailor. Kennedy at Wairau Bar in 2012 In 1919 she was sold to Manawatu Shipping Co. Ltd, after Levin and Company's Queen of the South was wrecked early in 1919, near Cape Campbell, en route from Wellington to Lyttelton. To replace her they bought Kennedy from Anchor. In 1921 Levins tried her on a weekly Foxton-Wellington-Lyttelton service, but by the end of 1923 patronage was poor and Levin's withdrew it. Kennedy continued to run between Foxton and Wellington, until, on 18 November 1928, she ran aground at Foxton and buckled her hull. She was then the oldest registered ship in the country. Following that she was dismantled at Wellington and, in December 1929, towed to Wairau River mouth to form a breakwater. Her partly buried remains can still be seen. |
| Nelson | 1866–68 | 124 | Backhouse & Dixon, Middlesbrough | Paddle steamer built in 1863 to order of Trustees of Nelson Trust Fund and leased to Nelson & Marlborough Coast Steam Navigation Company Limited 1864–65. April 1865, stranded Hokitika Bar. Reconditioned and leased to a partnership of 6 men. 27 September 1865, stranded North Spit, Greymouth. Sold to Kilgour Bros, Greymouth, who refloated her. Sold to N Edwards & Co. in 1866. Wrecked West Wanganui 12 October 1868. Designed by Richardson, Duck and Co., Stockton-on-Tees. Length, 125 fret; breadth, 17 feet 6 inches: depth, 8 feet. She lay for a time at Middlesbrough as her speed trials were unsatisfactory; but on a trial trip on 12 December 1863 reached 13 kn (24 km/h; 15 mph). However, on her first speed trial at Nelson she only just exceeded 9 mph. |
| Murray | 1871–95 | 81 | Thomas B Seath & Co, Rutherglen | Murray at Greymouth in 1890s Single-screw steamer, built in 1859 as the Marquis of Conyngham's yacht, Cromwell, for J Winsop, Glasgow, with engines by Campbell & Sons and a speed of about 10 knots (19 km/h; 12 mph). She was first registered on 28 February 1861, and then had a deckhouse added and was altered to a 59nrt cargo ship renamed Murray with a 30 hp (22 kW) engine. She left Rothesay for Adelaide on 28 March 1861, arriving on 29 July. During the trip her compasses malfunctioned. In August 1862 George Johnson sold her to Byrnes & Co. to carry mail from Rockhampton to Port Denison. J Broomfield, Sydney, bought her in 1863 and she was converted to sail in 1864. In 1866 she was bought by Joseph Paul, Nelson. In 1867 she was 78nrt and re-engined to 18 hp (13 kW), by 1875. Joseph Kilgour (Anchor) had bought her in 1871 to carry mails from Nelson to Westport, Greymouth and Hokitika. She was lengthened in 1873. In 1876 she was registered as 114grt 117 x 16.4 x 7.8 ft and owned by John Symons since 1873. In 1887 was re-engined by Anchor, with an 1884 C2cyl 12"24"x15", 25 hp (19 kW) engine to 144grt 90nrt 122.5 x 16.3 x 9.4 ft. In September 1895 she returned to Sydney for William Pollock, Moruya, 1904 to P C Ashbury, about 1905 to Alexander Kethel, about 1913 to Evan Jones, about 1916 to Ernest A Wells, to Waugh & Johnson, Sydney, 1917. Converted to hulk 1917 and sank at moorings. |
| Wallace | 1872–85 | 89 | Wilson & Sparrow, Otago Foundry, Dunedin | Wallace at Albion Wharf being converted to a screw steamer by the Anchor Foundry (background) Wallace with 13 ft paddle-wheels, was launched on 12 November 1867 for the Harbour Steam Co at a cost of £5,000. She was 130 ft long, 15 ft 2in broad, 8 ft 2in deep, with oscillating engines from Gundagai (see above), 20in diameter, 2 ft. 6in stroke cylinders, 181psi boiler, which could drive her at about 12 kn (22 km/h; 14 mph). The engines were built by Robert Napier & Sons of Glasgow.Wallace was then the largest iron steamer built in New Zealand. Designed by Mill. Darling, of the Harbour Steamer Company, she was built in a yard on the reclaimed land near the site of M'Leod's soap works. She was bought by N Edwards & Co in June 1872, at about the same time as Murray. In 1884, following success with the Charles Edward the previous year, she was converted at the foundry, to a single screw, driven by a compound engine. She was laid up in December 1883 was being converted in June and returned to service on 3 November, when she was reported to be faster and her coal consumption reduced from 10 to 4 tons a day. Wrecked at Greymouth on 14 October 1885, where she was holed and became a total wreck, on a wall beside the railway. |
| Ocean Bird | 1873 | | | Ketch. |
| Waverley | 1887-16 | 125 | Bailey & Seager Freemans Bay, Auckland | Waverley was a schooner rigged, twin-screw, steamer, built in 1883 for Patea Steam Shipping Company for £5,700 to carry cargo and 42 passengers. She was 93 feet, 7 inches x 18 feet, 2 inches x 8 feet, 4 inches, with twin 25 h.p. engines. The saloon and smoking room were panelled in oak and maple, with crimson velvet upholstery. She arrived at Pātea on 23 May 1883. On 9 July 1886 Anchor bought her for £3,300 to replace Wallace, serving Wellington, Nelson, Westport, Greymouth, Picton, Foxton, Wanganui and Pātea, where she was stranded on 8 December 1887 (refloated 13 January) and 26 August 1896. 1897 lengthened by 18 feet, 5 inches and refitted to 157 tons. 1901 used on the overnight Nelson-Wellington service. April 1916 sold to Patea Farmers' Co-operative Freezing Company. She had insulated holds. She was again stranded at Pātea in November 1917, February 1919, April and October 1921 and April 1925. After dismantling at Wellington, she was towed by Wairau on 14 June 1928 to the Wairua River, where she was to form a breakwater, but was swept up the channel in a flood to the Wairau Lagoons (2 km south of Kennedy) and remains, despite being used for target practice by the army, as a feature on a walkway. |
| Aorere | 1889–96 | 73 | David Gilbertson, Nelson | Built 1886. Length on keel, 76 ft; overall, 88 ft; beam, 14 ft 6in: depth of hold, 6 ft. The frames were birch, the bottom planking, rimu, top, sides and deck, kauri. Hutson & Corbett, Kelvinhaugh, compound surface condensing of 16-horsepower nominal, with 10in. and 20in cylinders, piston stroke 12in. 6 ft. 6in. x 6 ft. 3in. round multi-tubular boiler, 2 ft. 9in. x 4 ft. mild steel furnace, carrying capacity 60 tons on a draught of 6 ft. 30 cwt steam winch. 14 ft. x 14 ft. saloon on deck amidships, under the bridge; the ladies' cabin. She was used for negotiating small river ports and towing large sailing ships at Nelson. She was sold to Anchor in June 1889 to serve Pātea and Whanganui. She was stranded on Pātea bar in 1892, 1897 and 1912. Aorere was sold in 1896, but continued working for Anchor. After being laid up for 2 years, she was sold to Eastbourne Borough Council as a ferry in 1918. Her final sale was to Spiral & Lock Bar Steel Pipe Company, Wanganui in 1919. Aorere was wrecked on a beach 5 mi (8.0 km) south of the Rangitīkei River on 23 May 1920, due to leaking in a rough sea. |
| Alexander | 1903–50 | 377 | Mackie & Thompson, Govan | Alexander arrived at Nelson on 10 December 1903. She was named after Alexander Brown and remained in service for 46 years. 143 feet overall length, 24 feet beam, and 10 feet 6 inches depth of hold. Her engines were of 290ihp, which gave a speed of about 10 kn (19 km/h; 12 mph). She carried about 30 passengers and 350 tons, being designed to work the shallow draught ports visited by Anchor steamers, with a strengthened hull to allow her to lie aground fully loaded. The steel-hull, twin-screw ship had 4 watertight bulkheads, 2 hatches, was lit by electricity, straight stemmed, with 2 pole masts, with fore and aft canvas. She ran aground in French Pass in April 1930, but was refloated after 3 days, with only 3 rivets damaged. She was converted to diesel engine in 1931. Alexander was laid up in February 1949, and replaced by Mamaku. She was sold 1950, She was wrecked on Aitutaki on 13 August 1951, whilst sailing from Suva. |
| Lily | 1905–06 | 29 | Sims & Brown, Auckland | Lily at Nelson about 1905 Lily had twin screws driven by a 7 hp, or 14 hp (10 kW), Fraser & Tinne engine, was 68 ft (21 m) x 15.5 ft (4.7 m) and was launched on 20 November 1872 for Captain Jeremiah Casey, Auckland. She was similar to his steamer Gemini. In February 1873 she took 5 days from Auckland to Helensville, including 2 days coaling and sheltering at Kawakawa. From 24 February she served Kaipara on a government contract. Minnie Casey replaced her in 1876 and she returned to serving Riverhead. She was sold to William H Colbeck, Kaipara Steamship Co in 1878. They sold their fleet in 1882, 1885 to Kamo Colliery Company Limited, Auckland, 1887 to W F Potter Snr & Jnr, in 1889 she was serving Shortland, Pūkorokoro / Miranda and Tapu. In 1891 she went to Nelson. 1891 to Jas. Wigg, then Thomas Harley & James Fowler, Nelson, then John Couper, Hawkes Bay, 1893 to Frederick C Batchelor, Nelson, then Anchor for the Motueka – Nelson service, until replaced by Koi, She was refitted in 1903, including a larger screw. 1906 to J C White, Wellington, 1914 to F C Pulley to be scrapped on Petone Beach. |
| Koi | 1906–30 | 124 or 136 tons. | Anchor Foundry, Nelson with parts from John Shearer, Scotstoun | Koi after lengthening in 1910 Koi was launched on 24 July 1906 to replace Lily on the Nelson-Motueka route. Her length was 93 ft 6in; breadth, 16 feet; depth 6 ft 4in and her speed was 11.5 kn (21.3 km/h; 13.2 mph). Waves capsized her as she entered Nelson harbour on 30 March 1910. She was raised on 31 May and returned to service in November, after being lengthened by about 17 ft. In 1927 and 1928 she served Collingwood, until replaced by Te Aroha. In 1930 she was sold for use as a coal hulk at Picton. She sank at her moorings on 10 March 1940, but in May was towed to about 30m off the headland, east of Double Cove, where she was partly broken up in 1941. She has become an artificial reef and is a, "diving experience, particularly for the beginner", as the water is only about 12m deep. (see Picton article) |
| Tasman | 1907–08 | 179 | Robert Logan Snr., Auckland | SS Tasman 1903–1921 Tasman was a wooden, twin-screw ship, with electric lighting, built in 1903 for James Cross Burford, to run between Motueka, Nelson and Wellington as the Whangarona, but renamed Tasman before being commissioned. Due to ill health she was sold to Anchor on 28 January 1907. She was 112 ft long, 21 ft broad, 7 ft. deep, built with 3 diagonal layers of kauri and iron. Compound engines were George Fraser & Sons' 160 lb per square inch, 8½" high-pressure cylinders, 22½" low-pressure, with a 12" stroke at 260rpm, producing 280 indicated horsepower. The boiler was 9.6 ft in diameter and length, with 2 Fox corrugated furnaces. She was sold to Northern Steamship (NSSC) in July 1908. On 12 May 1921 she was wrecked on Rurima Reef. The captain and chief officer were found negligent in checking the ship's position, but they did not lose their certificates. |
| Waimea | 1909–28 | 454 | Mackie & Thompson, Govan | Waimea was a 150.6 ft x 26.0 ft x 9.9 ft steel steamer, launched on 25 January 1909, with a 2-screw, 2xT3Cyl (11, 17 & 28 – 21)in. 100RHP engine by Ross & Duncan, Glasgow. She was built for Anchor, but chartered to Union in 1927 and transferred in 1928, Anchor in 1936 and Union in 1939 to recover her boiler. Speed 9 kn (17 km/h; 10 mph) 9 September 1927: Lost a propeller off Portland Island. 22 February 1932: Involved in a collision with the Maui Pomare at Auckland. 25 January 1939: Stranded at Golden Bay. 31 May 1939: Left Nelson in tow of the Kaitoa for Wellington. 8 August 1939: Her boiler was removed and fitted into Wingatui. Her hull was later scuttled off Turakirae Head, Cook Strait. |
| Nikau | 1909–54 | 248 | Mackie & Thompson, Govan | StateLibQld 1 147795 Steamship Nikau with a full load of passengers Twin-screw Length, 120 feet; breadth, 22 feet; depth, 8 feet. electric light, saloons for 16 men and 8 ladies, 2 hatchways with a Clarke-Chapman steam winch at each. 2 compound engines by Ross and Duncan, Glasgow, the high pressure, cylinder diameter 10 inches, low pressure 22 inches, stroke 16 inches. boiler 11 feet diameter, 10 feet long. 2 furnaces, working pressure 130 lbs. Oval funnel of extra length. Nikau left Greenock on 4 May 1909, Port Said 23–25 May, Colombo 12–13 June, Fremantle 3–6 July. Greenock to Nelson 12,881 miles in 72d 3h 18m at an average 7.4 kn (13.7 km/h; 8.5 mph). In 1954 she ran for NSS for a short time, before being sold for work in the Pacific, where she was wrecked on South Tanna Is, Vanuatu 1964. 120.2 x 22.1 x 7.3 |
| Kaitoa | 1909–50 | 304 | Mackie & Thompson, Govan | Withdrawn 1949. |
| Regulus | 1913–35 | 584 | Swan, Hunter & Wigham Richardson Ltd, Wallsend | Steel cargo ship, launched on 16 February 1907 for Westport Coal Co Ltd, Dunedin, 170 ft (52 m) x 29.9 ft (9.1 m) x 9.7 ft (3.0 m), with 2 x 2-cylinder (17 & 24 x 21ins) 36nhp, or 150 nhp compound engines by A G Mumford Ltd, Colchester, driving 2 screws at up to 11 knots (20 km/h; 13 mph), sold to Anchor in March 1913, 8 February 1916 grounded in Queen Charlotte Sound / Tōtaranui, 12 December 1927 minor collision with Thistle, a lighter at Whanganui, 1936 scrapped at Nelson by F E Jackson & Co Ltd. |
| Ngaio | 1921–35 | 1203 | William Denny Dumbarton | Maporika leaving Nelson about 1910. The Anchor foundry is at the foot of the hill on the right In 1921 Union's Mapourika was sold to Anchor and renamed Ngaio, but continued on the Wellington Nelson run until April 1953, when the ferry service ended. Ngaio ran on her own after Matangi was sold in 1952, but, as the largest of Anchor's ships (67.05 m (220.0 ft) long, 10.10 m (33.1 ft) wide and 4.31 m (14.1 ft) deep), was very expensive to run. She was sold in May 1953 to Pakistan. She had a 130 nhp triple-expansion steam engine, single screw and reached 11.95 kn (22.13 km/h; 13.75 mph) on trials). She carried 146 first class, 34 second class, 1,116 cubic metres (39,415 cubic feet) of cargo As Mapourika she was launched on 7 May 1898, handed over on 27 June 1898 and cost Union £34,553 for their Wellington/Nelson/Westport/Greymouth service. On 1 October 1898 she went ashore at Greymouth breakwater. Nearly 100 men spent 4 months to re-launch her on 10 March 1899. In December 1899 she was transferred to the Wellington/Lyttelton service. Other incidents were being aground off Picton on 23 August 1900, damaged off Pencarrow on 28 April 1901, stranded at French Pass on 2 January 1902 and being grounded at Nelson on 17 January and 3 December 1904, 11 August 1906 and at Shag Port Otago on 6 November 1905. On 19 June 1908 she collided with Ingrid at Westport and on 11 March 1911 with Pateena at Nelson. On 30 August 1916 she sprang a leak in Blind Bay and on 1 August 1930 hit Wellington quay. In 1918 she was transferred to the Wellington/Picton/Nelson service and in 1921 sold to Anchor and renamed Ngaio. Her service ended in 1935 and she was broken up at Nelson by Jackson & Co in 1936. |
| Titoki | 1922–58 | 625 | Scotland | Titoki was replaced by another Titoki in 1958 (see below). |
| Mayflower | 1922–29 | 124 | Tomakin | Former Union coal hulk at Wellington moved to Nelson. She was broken up in 1929. |
| Sea Scout | 1925–32 | 128 | Huon River | Bought training ship for a coal hulk at Nelson. Sold for firewood. |
| Orepuki | 1925–36 | 536 | Goole Shipbuilding & Repairing Co Ltd | SS Orepuki in 1923 2 May 1908: Launched. July 1908: Completed as Tay I for Edward P Hutchinson, Hull by Goole Shipbuilding & Repairing Co Ltd. Gross tonnage 536 grt, Net tonnage 224 nrt, length 50.29 m (165.0 ft), Breadth 7.92 m (26.0 ft), Depth 3.84 m (12.6 ft). Engines 450 ihp Triple expansion steam engine, drove her at about 10 kn (19 km/h; 12 mph). In 1913 she was sold to Herbert V Parbury, London, then to B M Corrigan & Co, Sydney, in March 1916 to Daniel & Tom Wilson Reese, Christchurch (when she was renamed Orepuki) and in February 1925 to Anchor, along with the Opua. She was scrapped in 1936 by F E Jackson & Co at Nelson. |
| Opua | 1925–26 | 575 | A & J Inglis Pointhouse | Opua was a twin-screw steel steamer 184.2 ft. length, 28 ft. beam, and 9.6 ft. depth built in 1902 as the ss Ramornie for the North Coast Steam Navigation Co (NCSN). In 1919 she was sold to McCorkill, Perth, 1921 to the Reese brothers and renamed Opua, 1925 to Anchor (after opening of Otira Tunnel reduced demand for colliers) and in 1926 she was wrecked in fog at Tora and remained visible in 2012, just south of the Awhea River. |
| Arahura | 1925–50 | 1596 | William Denny Dumbarton | Arahura at Greymouth Union brought Arahura to New Zealand late in 1905, running between Nelson, Wellington, Picton and West Coast ports, then between Napier, Gisborne and Auckland and later between Wellington and Picton. Anchor bought her in December 1925 and she was then on the Nelson-Wellington service. She had a crew of 42, including 6 firemen. |
| Totara | 1926–55 | 421 | Hull | Totara (left) and Titoki (right) at Wellington. Built 1921. Laid up 1952, but refurbished to replace Ngaio in 1953, until laid up again in June 1955 and sent to Pelorus and Japan with Matangi. She was photographed at the Whakatahurie breakers yard in 1956. Another Totara joined the fleet in 1957 (see below). |
| Te Aroha | 1928–33 | 105 | Auckland | A scow, which replaced Koi on Collingwood route in March 1928. |
| Rata | 1929–58 | 974 | Bow, McLachlan Paisley | Used as a minesweeper. Built 1929 by Bow, McLachlan & Company Limited, Paisley. 1958 sold to Lanena Shipping Company, Hong Kong. Towed from Nelson to Hong Kong by tug Cabrilla and broken up 1959. |
| Motu | −49 | | | Hulk. Withdrawn 1949. |
| Matangi | 1929–52 | 1,366 | Alexander Stephen & Sons, Linthouse | StateLibQld 1 149671 Matangai (ship) Launched on 16 June 1908 as Mourilyan for Howard Smith & Co. Ltd, Melbourne, she was sold in 1913 to Australian Steam Ships Pty. Ltd., Melbourne, used by the navy in WW1 as H.M.S. Mourilyan, then sold to NSSC and renamed Matangi, arriving at Auckland on 26 June 1923. She could take 150 passengers and served Tauranga and Whangarei, until railway openings reduced traffic on those routes and she was replaced by the smaller Ngapuhi. Matangi was initially chartered from 8 June 1929 to cover for winter overhauls of Ngaio and Arahura, then sold to Anchor to run with Arahura on Wellington-Nelson run. She was 67.29 m (220.8 ft) long, 11.03 m (36.2 ft) wide, 11 ft deep, had, 2 triple expansion engines producing 1,900 ihp to drive twin-screws up to 11.5 kn (21.3 km/h; 13.2 mph). On 3 August 1925 her rudder was damaged in the Hauraki Gulf, which happened again on 13 September 1939 off Jackson's Head. On 26 November 1930 she struck a submerged object in the Cook Strait. On 23 February 1944 she got stranded at Nelson. In September 1945 she was repainted in black and white. In 1952 she was replaced by Ngaio and on 18 April 1952 she was towed to F A & N J Wells, Wakatahuri, Pelorus Sound for dismantling. In 1956 Totara and Matangi were sold to Japan for scrap and were also loaded with rails from Wellington's trams. In 1957 her hull was towed to Hong Kong by the tug Bustler and she was broken up. |
| Taupata | 1930–49 | 268 | George Niccol Auckland | Taupata was built of kauri, sheathed with totara and had a keel protected by ironbark. She was launched on 28 October 1930, had two masts, two diesel engines of 140 h.p. each, which could drive her at over 10 kn (19 km/h; 12 mph), and a hold of about 350 tons capacity, with two hatches. Anchor used her to carry fruit from Motueka, Mapua and Nelson to Wellington, as she had only an 8 ft (2.4 m) draught. She was 130 ft. long and 26 ft. 6in wide. |
| Himatangi | 1930–36 | 479 | Ardrossan Dry Dock & Shipbuilding Company | Coolebar beached in 1917 Coolebar, or Himatangi 1929-37 Himatangi was launched on 21 October 1911 as Coolebar, 1 of 14 NCSN ships delivered between 1904 and 1913 with names ending in 'bar'. She was 45.82 m (150.4 ft) long, 9.15 m (30.1 ft) wide, 2.65 m (8.7 ft) deep and had 2 compound steam engines of 500 ihp, driving twin screws. She ran aground at the entrance to the Bellinger River in 1912. After Levin and Co ended their Foxton service, with the damage to Kennedy, Holm & Co backed a Wellington syndicate, Himatangi Shipping Co, to buy Coolebar, renamed Himatangi (an 1899-1918 Foxton ship, owned by Levin & Co, had the similar name, Himitangi). Holm & Co managed Himatangi and Captain Mariner Holm collected her at Sydney in 1929. There was a 7-month gap between the loss of Kennedy and the arrival of Himatangi in June 1929. Canterbury Steam Shipping Co built a motor ship, Foxton, for the service, also in 1929. She proved more popular and Himatangi was sold to Anchor on 29 November 1930. However, in September 1931 Himatangi was laid up at Wellington, until towed to Sydney by the trawler Elsie Cam and sold in 1936 to North Wallarah Colliery, then to Cam & Sons, Sydney and renamed Coolebar in 1937, to NCSN in 1938, used as a minesweeper during World War II, sold to China in 1947 and renamed East River. She was then arrested for debt at Newcastle and her name again reverted to Coolebar, but she was laid up and sank at her mooring on 25 September 1949. In 1958 she was raised in sections and melted down by Broken Hill Pty. |
| Puriri | 1938–41 | 927 | Henry Robb, Leith | The twin-screw, Robb coaster type, 188.2 ft long, beam 35.2 ft. depth 12.05 ft motor ship was driven by an airless injection, 2-cycle Atlas Diesel at 10 kn (19 km/h; 12 mph). She was built under A. Irvine Brown's supervision, launched at Leith on 24 October 1938 by Mrs Brown and sailed via Panama in November to reach Auckland in January 1939. She had hatches of 42 ft 6in x 16 ft, and 25 ft 8in x 16 ft, 3 winches and a hold of about 50,000 ft^{3}. She was built of mild steel with a raked stem, flat plate keel, and cruiser stern. She struck a mine and sank on 14 May 1941, whilst working as a minesweeper off Bream Head. A memorial was erected in 2016, just to the north, at Ocean Beach. |
| Hokitika | 1941–42 | 205 | John McGregor Dunedin | Built in 1916 for NSS and named Waipu, she was converted to a motor ship and renamed Hokitika in 1936, when bought by Eclipse Shipping Co, a KDV Box Company subsidiary, to bring timber from Bruce Bay to Foxton, and continued until sold to Anchor on 16 October 1941. Hokitika was the last ship to serve Foxton. She was taken a year later for use in the Pacific with the US Navy. In 1945 she was sold to Aspden Shipping Co. Ltd, Auckland as a cement carrier, in 1954 to E. Savoie of Noumea and renamed Colorado Del Mar, then sold to Établissements Ballande, Santu, New Hebrides and renamed Havannah. In 1959 she went to Wide Bay Syndicate, Maryborough, in 1960 to Blue Pacific Charter, Brisbane (renamed Blue Pacific) and in 1965 to H.C. Williams of Rarotonga and again named Havannah. |
| Puriri | 1948–74 | 1248 | Henry Robb, Leith | Length: 212' 6" Breadth: 40' 10" Draught: 12' 7". Launched on 22 July 1948, she arrived at Wellington on 8 January 1949 and on 12 February 1959 took her first load of cement from NZ Cement Company at Cape Foulwind to Gisborne and Napier. In April 1974 she was laid up at Nelson, then sold to Maldives Shipping Corporation, Malé and renamed Maldive Pilot. Next year she was sold to Power Shipping (Pte) Ltd., Singapore and renamed Yellow River and scrapped by Ya Chou Steel Manufacturing, Kaohsiung after 16 December 1979. |
| Mamaku | 1949–72 | 927 | Henry Robb, Leith | Mamaku replaced Alexander. Length: 186' 6" Breadth: 37' 10" Draught: 12' 3" She was launched on 28 July 1949 and reached Auckland on 23 December 1949. In 1972 she was sold to Pacific Islands Transport Ltd., Port Vila, in 1973 to J.C. Jean-Louis, Port Vila and renamed Mamatu, then Mamani by Hiap Seng Shipping & Trading, Singapore, Thani by Kean Leelathan, Bangkok in 1979, Kai by Hai Soon in 1982 and Union 2, then Haydai in 1986, before being broken up that year. |
| Ngaio | 1950–55 | 3566 | USA | Inter-Island Steam, of Honolulu, sold their 1929 Hualalai to Anchor in 1949. She arrived in Wellington on 29 October 1949, when it was realised that she required substantial alteration and would not be ready for Christmas. She was renamed Ngaio and made her first Wellington to Nelson trip on 22 May 1950. |
| Matipo | 1954–68 | 398 | Holland | Further replacements were needed, so Zephyr II was chartered for a year, until the 1953 Dutch built coaster, Birgitte Basse, reached Wellington on 8 January 1955 and was renamed Matipo. She ran between Nelson and Wellington, until rail ferry competition reduced it to a one ship trade on 29 January 1968, when she was sold. |
| Towai | 1954–69 | 565 | Ships built at James Pollock & Sons, Faversham | Matipo was closely followed by the Purple Emperor, which reached Wellington on 16 January 1955. By March she was refitted, renamed Towai and her first cargo was fruit from Māpua and Motueka for Wellington. In December 1966 she took over the Nelson – Wellington service from Konanda until it ended in March 1969, when she was sold. Length: 180' 0" Breadth: 30' 1" Draught: 10' 9" Originally laid down as Sea Hurricane, in 1945 for the Royal Navy, but cancelled in 1946, sold to E.J.& W. Goldsmith Ltd., London in 1948 and completed in April 1949 as Golden Hind. In 1952 she was sold to Coastal Tankers Ltd., London and renamed Purple Emperor. In September 1954 Anchor bought her. In April 1969 she was sold to Coastal Tug & Barge Pty Ltd., Port Moresby and renamed Akana, then to Sea Freight Pty Ltd., Port Moresby in 1974, Ali Ahamed, Malé in 1977 and renamed Mina Maaree. and to D. Ibrahim Kaleyfaanui, Malé and renamed Maafahi in 1979. In late 1983 she was scuttled off Malé. |
| Totara | 1957–78 | 855 | E.J. Smit & Zoon, Westerbroek | Totara was a collier, carrying about 850 tons. She loaded sodium sulphate at Rotterdam, left Dover on 8 April 1957 and arrived at Auckland on 25 May. In June 1975 she took over the Nelson-Onehunga cargo route, replacing Pukeko. Length: 218' 0" Breadth: 34' 5" Draught: 12' 6". After Anchor lost a contract to ship dolomite to Mount Maunganui, she was sold in April 1978 to Pacific Navigation, Singapore and renamed Pacific Bold, in 1987 to Island Enterprises Pte Ltd., Malé and renamed Antares, in 1990 to Island Trade & Travel Pte Ltd., Malé and renamed Sygnus and in 1991 to Maahal Enterprise Ltd., Maldives and renamed Riviheli. In April 2000: she was sold to shipbreakers in Mumbai. |
| Titoki | 1958–82 | 855 | E.J. Smit & Zoon, Westerbroek | As Totara was being completed, Anchor ordered their last ship, a sister ship,Titoki, launched on 30 November 1957 and handed over on 28 March 1958. Length: 218' 0" Breadth: 34' 5" Draught: 12' 6". She loaded 400 tons of steel at Genoa for Lyttelton and arrived at Nelson on 31 May. Her usual cargo was coal from the West Coast and dolomite from Tarakohe to North Island ports. On 12 June 1975, when Pukeko was sold, she was moved from Greymouth-Wellington to Nelson-Onehunga, though on 31 August 1975 she grounded at the north entrance to the Grey River. She was refloated later that day with 3 bulldozers and her engines and repaired at Nelson for $70,000. She was replaced by Union Nelson, marking the end of Anchor, when she was sold on 21 March 1982 to Tropic Island Shipping Co. Pte Ltd., and renamed Wild Rover. In 1985 Trans American International, Singapore renamed her Varuna and later that year, Golden Pearl Shipping Co. Ltd., Valletta renamed her Golden Pearl. In 1986 Intercity Shipping Co. bought her and renamed her Intercity. On 2 October 1987 she arrived at Mangalore for scrapping. |

Ships were painted salmon pink to the water line, with a black hull, the super-structure finished in white and the funnel white, topped in black.
