= WTE =

WTE or Wte may refer to:

- Waste-to-energy (WtE), the process of generating energy in the form of electricity and/or heat
- Whole time equivalent, a unit of measurement
- World Taekwondo Europe, the official governing body for all Taekwondo matters in Europe
- Westerbroek railway stop, the station code WTE
- Whitlocks End railway station, West Midlands, England, National Rail station code WTE
- Wave to Earth, a South Korean indie rock band
