= HMAS Coolebar =

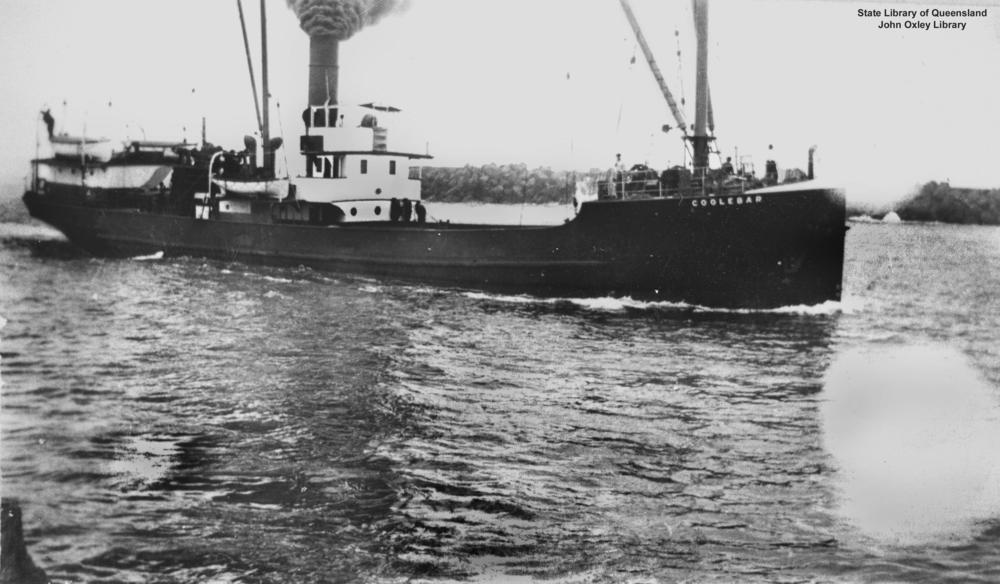
- Coolebar in civilian service

History
- Name: (Australia) Coolebar; (New Zealand) Himatangi; (Australia) HMAS Coolebar; (Australia) East River
- Owner: North Coast Steam Navigation Company (1911-1929, 1936-1945); Himatangi Shipping Co Ltd (Holm & Co) (1930); Anchor Shipping and Foundry Company (1931-1936); Royal Australian Navy (1945-1946); A.J. Ellerker and Company (1946–47); Fu Chan (1948-1949)
- Builder: Ardrossan Dry Dock and Shipbuilding Co Ltd, Ardrossan, Scotland
- Launched: 21 October 1911
- In service: 1911
- Out of service: September 1949
- Fate: Sank in 1949

History

Australia
- Name: HMAS Coolebar
- Commissioned: 18 December 1939
- Decommissioned: 18 February 1943
- Recommissioned: 1 July 1943
- Decommissioned: 1 June 1945
- Reclassified: Stores carrier (1943)
- Honours and awards: Battle honours: Darwin 1942-43
- Fate: Returned to civilian service

General characteristics
- Type: Steamer/Auxiliary minesweeper
- Displacement: 479 tons
- Length: 150 ft 3 in (45.80 m) o/a
- Beam: 30 ft (9.14 m)
- Draught: 8 ft 4 in (2.54 m)
- Speed: 8 knots (15 km/h; 9.2 mph)
- Complement: 4 officers and 17 ratings
- Armament: 1 x 12-pdr QF gun; 2 x Oerlikon 20mm AA guns; 1 x Vickers machine gun

HMAS Coolebar (J25), was a merchant steamer launched in 1911, that was requisitioned and commissioned as an auxiliary minesweeper and stores carrier during World War II by the Royal Australian Navy.

== Construction and pre-war service ==
Coolebar was built in 1911 in Ardrossan, Scotland by the Ardrossan Dry Dock and Shipbuilding company for the Australian North Coast Steam Navigation Company. Initially working as a steamer in Australian waters, the ship was sold to the Himatangi Shipping Company in Wellington, New Zealand in 1930, where she was renamed Himitangi, before being on-sold to the Anchor Shipping and Foundry Company in Napier, where she continued to serve until 1936.

Returning to Australian waters and ownership with the North Coast Navigation Company, she was renamed Coolebar and continued in civilian usage until the outbreak of World War 2, when she was requisitioned by the Royal Australian Navy on 20 October 1939.

== War service ==
With the outbreak of World War 2, a need for minesweepers by the Royal Australian Navy, led to the requisition of over 30 civilian vessels, with Coolebar commissioned as HMAS Coolebar on 18 December 1939, under the command of Lieutenant Commander Peter M MacIntosh, RANR(S). Based out of Sydney, she largely served with Minesweeping Group 50, until she was paid-off on 18 February 1943.

The January 1943 loss of HMAS Patricia Cam in the Wessel Islands, led to a need for Coolebar to be recommissioned, and on 1 July 1943 she was brought back to naval service. Reclassified as a stores carrier under the command of Lieutenant Kenneth O Shatwell, RANVR, she sailed for Darwin, arriving in August.

While in Darwin, she served as a tender vessel to the shore base HMAS Melville, and assisted HMAML 814 during preparations for the ill-fated Operation Bulldozer. A clandestine attempt to land Services Reconnaissance Department and Z Special Unit forces into Japanese occupied Timor. Her service in Darwin saw her awarded the Battle Honour "Darwin 1942-43" following a review of Australian Battle Honours in 2010.

During 1944 and 1945 she ferried supplies between Darwin and Sydney, until being paid-off at war's end on 1 June 1945.

== Post war service ==
After being decommissioned, she was sold to a local firm, before being sold to a Chinese company in 1948 who renamed her East River. The following year while at her moorings in Newcastle awaiting scrapping, she sank before being eventually raised and removed in 1958.
