= TSS Arahura =

Coordinates: 41.6°S 175.1°E

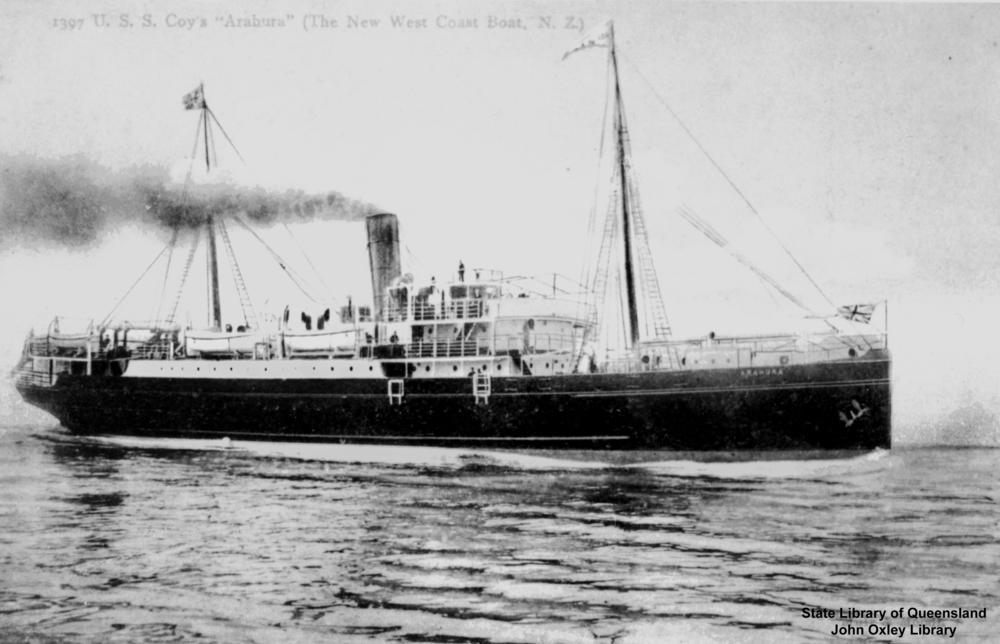
- TSS Arahura

History

New Zealand
- Name: Arahura
- Namesake: Arahura River
- Owner: Union Steam Ship Company 1905–26 Anchor Shipping Company 1926–50 B T Daniel 1950–52
- Port of registry: Port of Dunedin 1905–1926 Port of Nelson 1926–1950
- Route: New Zealand coastal waters
- Ordered: 1905
- Builder: William Denny and Brothers, Dumbarton, Scotland
- Cost: £52,000
- Yard number: 755
- Laid down: January 1905
- Launched: 25 March 1905
- Completed: 19 July 1905
- Maiden voyage: 19 July 1905
- Out of service: 1950
- Fate: Sunk by rockets fired by RNZAF Mosquito bombers in Operation Scuttle Two

General characteristics
- Type: Twin-screw steamer
- Tonnage: 1607 tons
- Length: 240.6 feet (73.3 m) p/p; 320 feet (98 m) o/a
- Beam: 36.6 feet (11.2 m)
- Draught: 27 feet 2 inches (8.3 m)
- Depth: 230.5 feet (70.3 m)
- Installed power: 1,514 NHP
- Propulsion: two triple-expansion engines
- Speed: 12.5 knots (23.2 km/h) (attained 15 knots (28 km/h) in sea trials)

TSS Arahura was a twin screw steam passenger/cargo ship (also schooner rigged) built for the Union Steam Ship Company. It was launched on the Clyde on 25 March 1905 and built by William Denny and Brothers Dumbarton at a cost of £52,000. It had a gross weight of 1,607 tons. The ship had accommodation for 201 passengers.

== Design and naming ==
In January 1905 Union Steam Ship Company designed and entered into a contract with D.J. Dunlop and Co of Port Glasgow to build a new steamship. It was to be similar to the Navua which had been specially built for the tropical passenger and cargo service. The Navua had been particularly successful for the company.

The new steamer was slightly larger than the Navua, but her passenger accommodation and cargo arrangements were similar. The company expected the steamer to be in service by the end of 1905. It was planned to use it on the Wellington – West Coast route. Because of this the company asked the Premier Richard Seddon to suggest a name or names for the vessel. Of the several names he put forward, Arahura was chosen. Arahura is a small river on the West Coast.

The papers of the day described the new ship as 320 ft long, 44 ft broad, and 28 ft 8.5 in deep. On deck there was accommodation for 90 saloon and 40 second saloon passengers. This was later reported as 150 saloon and 46 second saloon passengers. She was to have a speed of 12.5 knots at sea on a draught of 12 ft. The total capacity on a draught of 21 ft will be 3500 tons, including bunker coal. She was built of steel of the highest class of the British Corporation Registry and under their special survey. The propulsion was two triple-expansion engines. The vessel was built under the supervision of Captain Cameron, Marine Superintendent of the company. At her sea trials near Skelmorlie on the Firth of Clyde she attained 15 knots.

== Service ==
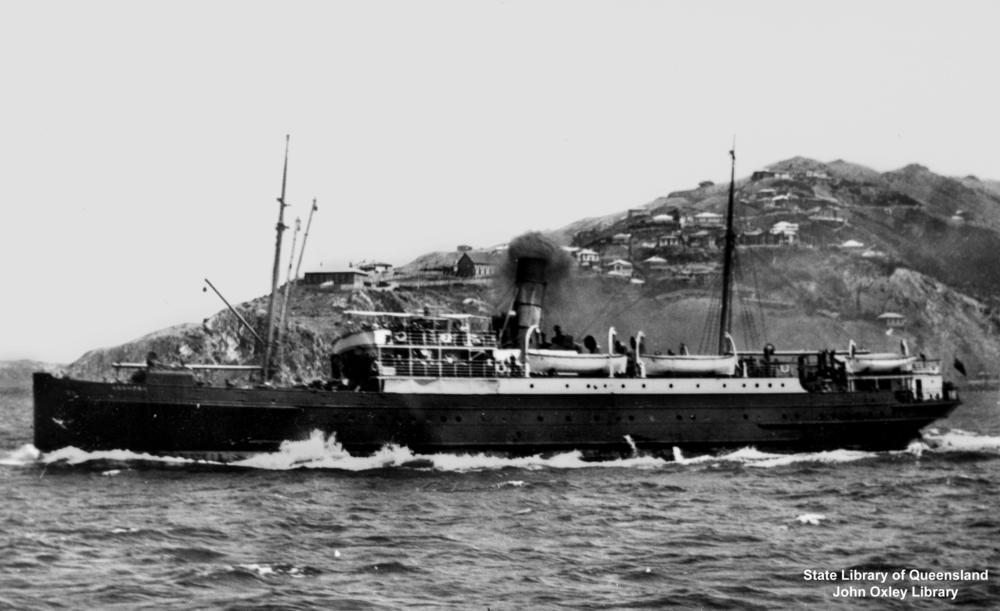
Arahura under way

=== Maiden voyage ===
The Arahura sailed from Greenock to London on 13 July 1905. She left London for New Zealand via Hobart on 19 July 1905 arriving in Dunedin on 10 September 1905.

Her Chief Officer, Mr. Dooely, recorded the passage. She left Greenock on 13 July, and had fine weather down channel. They landed the pilot at Waterford, and continued the voyage the next day experiencing light winds, with fine weather across the Bay of Biscay. The ship at St Vincent in the Cape de Verde group on 23 July where it took in a supply of coal. Leaving on 24 July her passage across the north-east trade belt was marked by fine weather. They crossed the equator on 29 July in longitude 11.30 W. From there they had moderate south easterly winds. On 3 August they crossed the Greenwich Meridian and rounded the Cape of Good Hope on 10 August. Crossing the Southern Ocean they had very boisterous weather, particularly in the vicinity of the Kerguelen Islands. From there they had more mode-rate weather, and arrived at Albany, Western Australia on 28 August, took in a supply of coal, and left again on 29 August. They had moderate weather until passing the island of Tasmania. They then encountered heavy gales followed by strong easterly winds until she made Foveaux Strait. From there until Dunedin they encountered fresh north easterly winds with thick weather.

The ship's officers on the maiden voyage were Captain Lambert, Chief Officer Mr Dooely formerly of the Antarctic discovery ship Morning, second officer Mr Thomson, third officer Mr Borlase, Chief Engineer Mr Scott, second engineer Mr Beveridge, third engineer Mr McAndrew, fourth engineer Mr Low, and Chief Steward Mr Levy.

=== New Zealand service ===
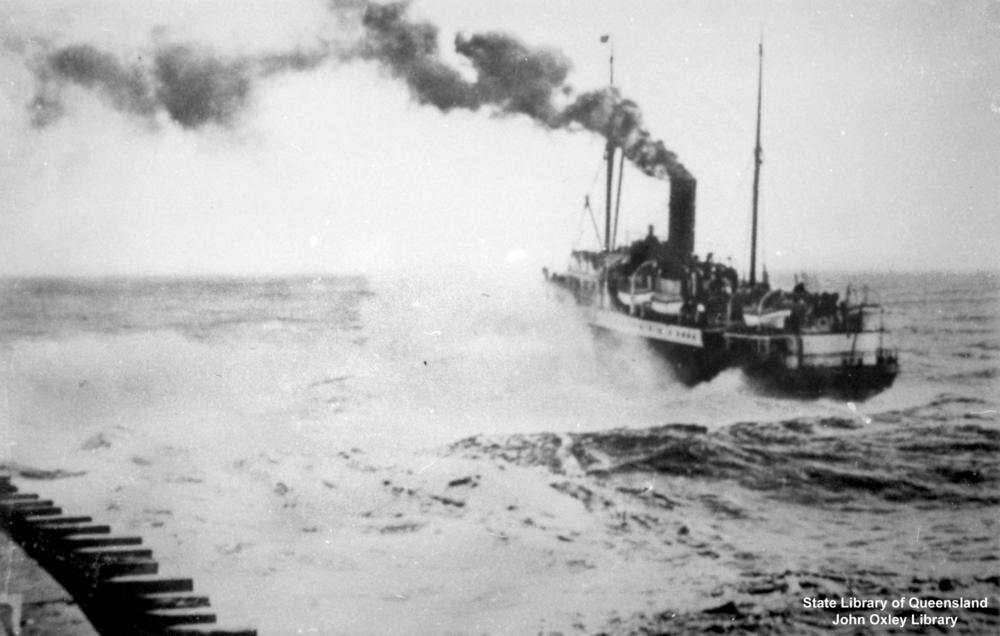
Crossing the Greymouth Bar

As a Union vessel she provided a passenger and cargo service between Wellington, Nelson, and the West Coast. She was initially used on the Wellington Nelson route before being used on the Wellington, West Coast run. In 1916 she was moved to the Wellington, Napier, Gisborne, Auckland run. She returned to the Wellington Nelson Picton run in October/November 1920, but later returned to the Napier Gisborne Auckland run.

On 14 November 1925 Arahura was transferred to the Anchor Shipping Company. She operated on the company's Wellington to Nelson service until 1949.

=== Demise and sinking ===
In May 1949 the ship underwent her regular survey. This found that she needed extensive repairs to reach the Lloyds A1 level. As this was uneconomic she was towed to Shelley Bay and laid up. In 1950 B.T. Daniel Ltd of Wellington bought the vessel and partly dismantled her.

The hull was towed into Cook Strait where it was used for target practice in Operation "Scuttle Two" by 75 Squadron RNZAF Mosquito bombers on 24 January 1952 and sunk. This was the second ship sunk as part of training by the squadron's Mosquitos, the first being the barque Lutterworth on 26 June 1950.

Seven Mosquitos under the command of Squadron Leader E C Gartrell, OBE used three-inch solid-headed rockets to sink the ship, while an eighth filmed the event for the National Film Unit. The attack lasted 35 minutes and the ship sank at 3:43 pm in 450 fathoms of water 15 miles south east of Baring Head after taking ten direct hits.

== Captains ==
=== Union Company ===
- 1905 – March 1914: Captain George Lambert and Chief Engineer T Scott were sent to Scotland to bring the ship back to Dunedin, New Zealand. Lambert remained its master until his retirement in March 1914. Lambert had been a sailor since he was 19 and had joined the Union Company in 1885 as captain of the SS Manawatu.
- April 1914 – August 1915: Captain Ritchie was appointed to replace Lambert. Ritchie had been Captain of the Mapourika.
- August 1915 – September 1915: Captain Cameron replaced Captain Ritchie but a month later was transferred to the Mararoa,
- September 1915: Captain Holmes took over from Captain Cameron in September 1915. Holmes was also appointed Harbour Master at Picton.
- October 1915 – 20 December 1915: Lambert was called out of retirement and temporarily appointed until a replacement for Holmes was found. Lambert was transferred to the Mapourika on 21 December 1915.
- 21 December 1915 – 10 January 1916: Ritchie was reappointed to Captain the Arahura until he was transferred to the Tarawera on 10 January 1916.
- 11 January 1916 – 18 February 1916: Captain Reid took over from Ritchie until the ship was relocated to the Napier Gisborne Auckland run.
- 19 February 1916 – 31 October 1923: Captain Huntley Dryden.
- 1 November 1923 – July 1924: Captain A Reed
- July 1924 – August 1924: Captain A B Sizer
- August 1924 – no later than February 1925: Reed was reappointed captain.
- At least February 1925 – 14 November 1925: Captain A H Prosser was the last captain of the ship under Union Company ownership. Both he and the Chief Engineer E A Griffiths were presented by the ships officers with a bronze smoker's pedestal to commemorate the occasion.

=== Anchor company ===
- 1925 – at least 11 June 1932: Captain William Arthur Wildman, former Captain of the Kaitoa and Ngaio. Wildman was born at Motueka in 1853. He joined the Anchor Company on the Charles Edward in 1875. Wildman died on 6 April 1937 aged 84.
- About December 1932 – 1947: Captain Robert "Bob" Hay. Hay was from Shetland but settled in New Zealand. He spent many years working for the Anchor Shipping Company of Nelson, and made nearly 9,000 crossings of the Cook Strait over the years. On his final voyage in 1947 he was piped on to the Arahura by the Wellington Watersider Pipe Band and piped off the boat at Nelson by the Nelson Band. He died on 3 September 1964.

== Incidents and accidents ==
=== Injured labourer ===
On 21 August 1906 Joseph Hunter, a Greymouth wharf labourer, was badly injured working No. 2 hold. A heavy chain sling was thrown down, striking him on the head and knocking him senseless. He sustained nasty cuts on the head and face.

=== Attempted arson ===
Arson was attempted on 31 January 1913 while the ship was berthed at Wellington. At about 7:40 pm smoke was seen coming from a lady's cabin of the second saloon aft. The door was locked and on being opened it was found that the bedding was smouldering. The bedding was thrown out on deck and the fire stamped out just as the Fire Brigade arrived. An examination of bedding found that it had been sprinkled with kerosene.

=== Wireless ===
In June 1914 the Government required all larger coastal passenger vessels to be equipped with radio transmitters, including the Arahura.

=== Grounding of the Komata ===
The Arahura assisted with the salvage of the Komata, a collier, that ran aground at Pencarrow Head in fog on 30 January 1915.

=== Storm damage ===
On 13 May 1916, the Arahura left Auckland for Gisborne and Napier at 2:10 pm carrying 400 tons of general cargo, mostly sugar for Gisborne. After leaving Auckland the Arahura immediately ran into bad weather, which became steadily worse. In the Bay of Plenty a strong gale and mountainous seas were encountered. The vessel laboured badly on Saturday night and by Sunday morning had sprung a leak. Nine feet of water was reported in the forward holds. Captain Dryden decided to make for shelter and fetched up off Whangaparae, Cape Runaway at 12 pm. Her pumps were started and were easily able to cope with the leak.

The vessel rode out the storm and left to come on to Gisborne at 4 am Monday morning arriving in the bay at 2:45 pm. Apart from the leak and damaged cargo the Arahua was unaffected. Some of the mail, especially that for Napier was damaged along with the sugar and a large quantity of the balance of the cargo. Because of the leak all passengers and cargo were offloaded at Gisborne and the ship sailed back to Auckland for repair on the Tuesday.

=== Collision ===
On 1 March 1917, at Gisborne, she was hit amidships by Waimate, beached, patched and returned to Auckland for repairs. Shortly after returning to service, 4 crew were injured, when benzine fumes in a hold exploded.

=== Tragedy of the Progress ===
In May 1931 the steamer Progress was blown on to rocks after losing power. The Arahura had offered assistance prior to this occurring, but was declined as the Captain of the Progress considered that there was no imminent danger and a tug was due from Wellington to assist.

=== Hon William Snodgrass mystery ===
In March 1939, the Hon William Snodgrass was returning from Wellington to Nelson on the overnight sailing. He retired to bed while the ship was sailing through Cook Strait, but in the morning he was missing. No trace was found of him.

== See also ==
- List of ships built by William Denny and Brothers
