= Battle honours of the Royal Australian Navy =

Australian naval award

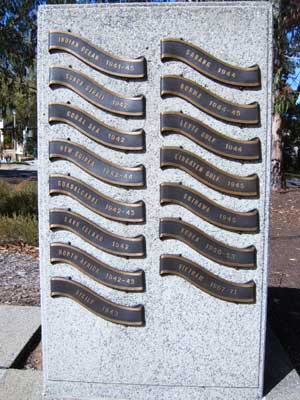
Battle honours displayed on the Royal Australian Navy Memorial in Canberra, Australian Capital Territory

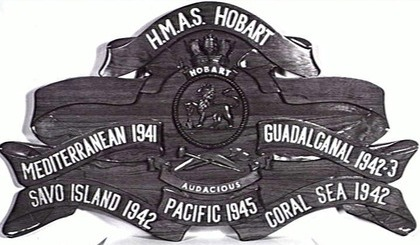
The battle honour board for HMAS Hobart

Ships and units of the Royal Australian Navy have received numerous battle honours throughout the navy's history.

Before 1947, battle honours awarded to RAN ships and units were administered solely by the British Admiralty. On 9 June 1947, an Australian "Badges, Names and Honours Committee" was established to administer and make recommendations to the Admiralty (and after the 1964 merger, the Naval department of the British Ministry of Defence) on battle honours, naval heraldry, and ship names. The RAN used the same honours list as the Royal Navy until the 1980s, with the exception of adding a battle honour for service in the Vietnam War. A large scale overhaul of the RAN battle honours system was completed in 2010, which included recognition of post-Vietnam operations, along with previous battles and campaigns not included in the British honours list.

Battle honours awarded to a ship are inherited by subsequent ships of the name. In addition, until 1989, Australian warships would inherit honours from British warships of the same name: for example, the Daring-class destroyer HMAS Vampire inherited honours from both the RAN V-class destroyer of the same name and the Royal Navy submarine HMS Vampire. One factor behind the change was so that Australia's HMAS Newcastle, the first ship to be named after Newcastle, New South Wales, would not inherit the battle honours of the eight British ships named after Newcastle on Tyne on entering service: most of the awards predated Australia's existence as a nation.

In addition to honours for large-scale battles, naval battle honours also include actions where the opposing side consisted of a single ship. Only three 'action' honours were awarded during the 20th century, with RAN warships receiving all three.

Note: The year ranges given are for the entire scope of the battle honour, particularly for campaigns. Individual ships that did not participate for the full duration were recognised with the battle honour, but with a reduced year range reflecting their participation.

== Pre-Federation conflicts ==
Note: Battle honours in this category were awarded to ships and units of the various colonial navies, and have been inherited by the RAN.

Battle honour	Criteria
New Zealand 1860–61	Involvement in the First Taranaki War.
China 1900–01	Involvement in the response to the Boxer Rebellion.

== World War I ==
Battle honour	Criteria
Rabaul 1914	The capture of German New Guinea and other German colonies in the Pacific by the Australian Naval and Military Expeditionary Force. The honour is named after the capture of German New Guinea's capital, Rabaul.
Emden 1914	The Battle of Cocos, a single-ship action between HMAS Sydney and SMS Emden.
Dardanelles 1915	Operations in and around the Dardanelles during the Gallipoli Campaign.
German East Africa 1915–1916	Blockade of German East Africa during the East African Campaign.
North Sea 1915–18	Operations with the British Grand Fleet in the North Sea.
Indian Ocean 1917	Patrols and searches for the German raider SMS Wolf.
Adriatic 1917–18	Involvement in the Adriatic Campaign.

== World War II ==
Battle honour	Criteria
Atlantic 1939–43	Convoy escort and combat operations in the North Atlantic.
Calabria 1940	The Battle of Calabria.
Spada 1940	The Battle of Cape Spada.
Libya 1940–41	Provision of inshore support to ground forces along the coast of Libya during the Western Desert Campaign.
East Indies 1940–44	Attacks on enemy shipping and shore establishments, or defence of convoys, in the Indian Ocean, Red Sea, Bay of Bengal, and the Arabian Sea.
Mediterranean 1940–43	Involvement in operations in the Mediterranean, excluding any operations with their own battle honours.
Bismarck 1941	Pursuit and destruction of the German battleship Bismarck.
Crete 1941	Involvement in the Battle of Crete.
Greece 1941	Involvement in the Battle of Greece.
Kormoran 1941	Battle between HMAS Sydney and German auxiliary cruiser Kormoran.
Matapan 1941	Involvement in the Battle of Cape Matapan.
Malta Convoys 1941–42	Operations in support of supply convoys to Malta.
Indian Ocean 1941–45	Anti-submarine patrols and convoy escort work in the Indian Ocean.
Pacific Ocean 1941–45	Operations in the South West Pacific, including convoy escort and anti-submarine patrols, and support of ground forces in Timor, the Solomon Islands, or Borneo. Does not include operations under the New Guinea campaign, which received their own battle honour.
Coral Sea 1942	Involvement in the Battle of the Coral Sea.
English Channel 1942	Convoy escort duties in the English Channel and nearby coastal areas.
Guadalcanal 1942	Involvement in the Guadalcanal Campaign.
Savo Island 1942	Involvement in the Battle of Savo Island.
Sunda Strait 1942	Involvement in the Battle of Sunda Strait.
Darwin 1942–43	Involvement in defending against Japanese air raids on Darwin.
New Guinea 1942–44	Involvement in the New Guinea campaign.
Sicily 1943	Involvement in the Allied invasion of Sicily.
Leyte Gulf 1944	Involvement in the Battle of Leyte Gulf and the amphibious landings at the start of the Battle of Leyte.
Sabang 1944	Involvement in the shore bombardment of Sabang, Indonesia on 25 July 1944.
Burma 1944–45	Involvement in the Allied reoccupation of Burma.
Borneo 1945	Involvement in the Borneo campaign.
Japan 1945	Involvement in the campaign against the Japanese Home Islands.
Lingayen Gulf	Involvement in the Invasion of Lingayen Gulf.
Okinawa 1945	Involvement in the Battle of Okinawa.

== 1946 to present ==
Battle honour	Criteria
Korea 1950–53	Involvement in the Korean War.
Malaya 1955–60	Involvement in the Malayan Emergency.
Malaysia 1964–66	Deployed in support of Malaysia during the Indonesia–Malaysia confrontation.
Vietnam 1965–72	Involvement in the Vietnam War. Originally limited to units that saw combat, but later expanded to include transport and logistic support ships and their escorts.
Kuwait 1991	Deployed to the Middle East during the Gulf War.
East Timor 1999–2000	Involvement in INTERFET peacekeeping operations in East Timor.
Persian Gulf 2001–03	Deployed to the Middle East during the war on terror.
Iraq 2003	Involvement in the 2003 invasion of Iraq.
