= Transport in Mangaluru =

Mangaluru's location in the Indian state of Karnataka makes it accessible by all forms of transport: road, rail, air and sea. It is the largest city in the Coastal Karnataka region, and is the only city in Karnataka and one among the six cities in India to have an International Airport, a Major Seaport, railway & road connectivities. It is the second prominent city of Karnataka after the state capital Bengaluru in all aspects. It is one of the fastest developing cities in India.

== Local public transport ==
Private buses leaving from State Bank Bus Stand

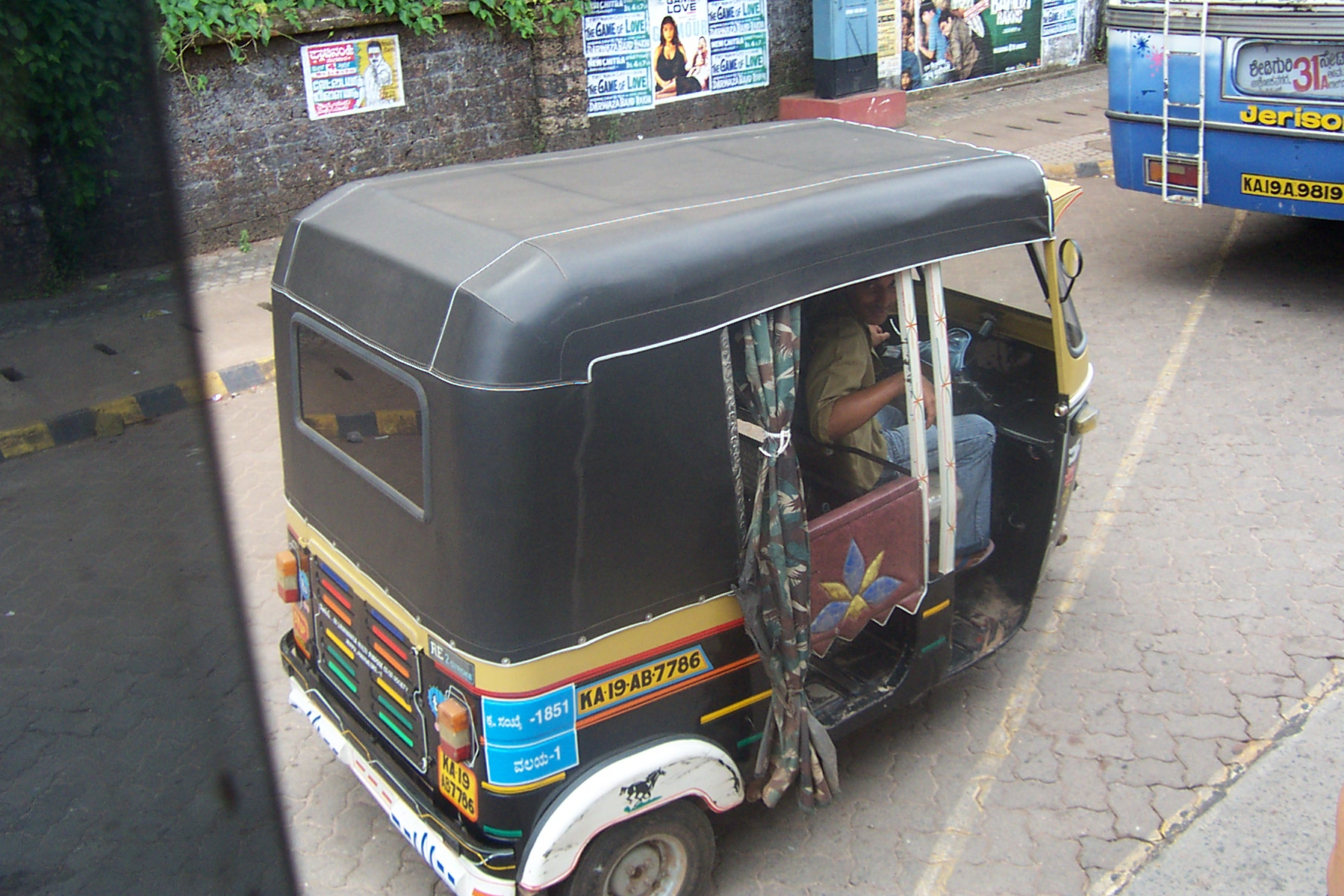
A typical Mangaluru Autorickshaw

Even though Mangaluru's city bus service is dominated by private operators such as DKBOA, with routes covering the full extent of the city and beyond, in recent days Karnataka State Road Transport Corporation is plying buses in multiple routes. There are two distinct sets of routes for the buses, with the city routes being covered by city buses, and the intercity routes being covered by service and express buses. KSRTC also operates green coloured JnNurm city buses from State Bank bus stand. These buses travel to different parts of the city and its suburbs. Service buses essentially touch some towns and villages on the intercity route. Service are run to various location like Udupi, Karkala and Kateel. However the frequency of service buses are extremely low. Express buses reach their destination with very limited stops in between. A list of bus routes inside Mangaluru can be found here.

Another mode for local transportation is the autorickshaw. The minimum cost charged by an autorickshaw up to 1.5 km is Rs 35. Meters are used in all autorickshaws plying inside the city and the suburbs, but most of the autorickshaw drivers do not charge according to meter. However charges are 1.5 times the displayed reading between 10 pm and 5 am. Taxi services in Mangaluru are provided by Ola Cabs and Uber, whose services extend to the Mangaluru International Airport. Motorcycle rental providers have also begun offering transport services in the city.

== Long distance bus routes ==
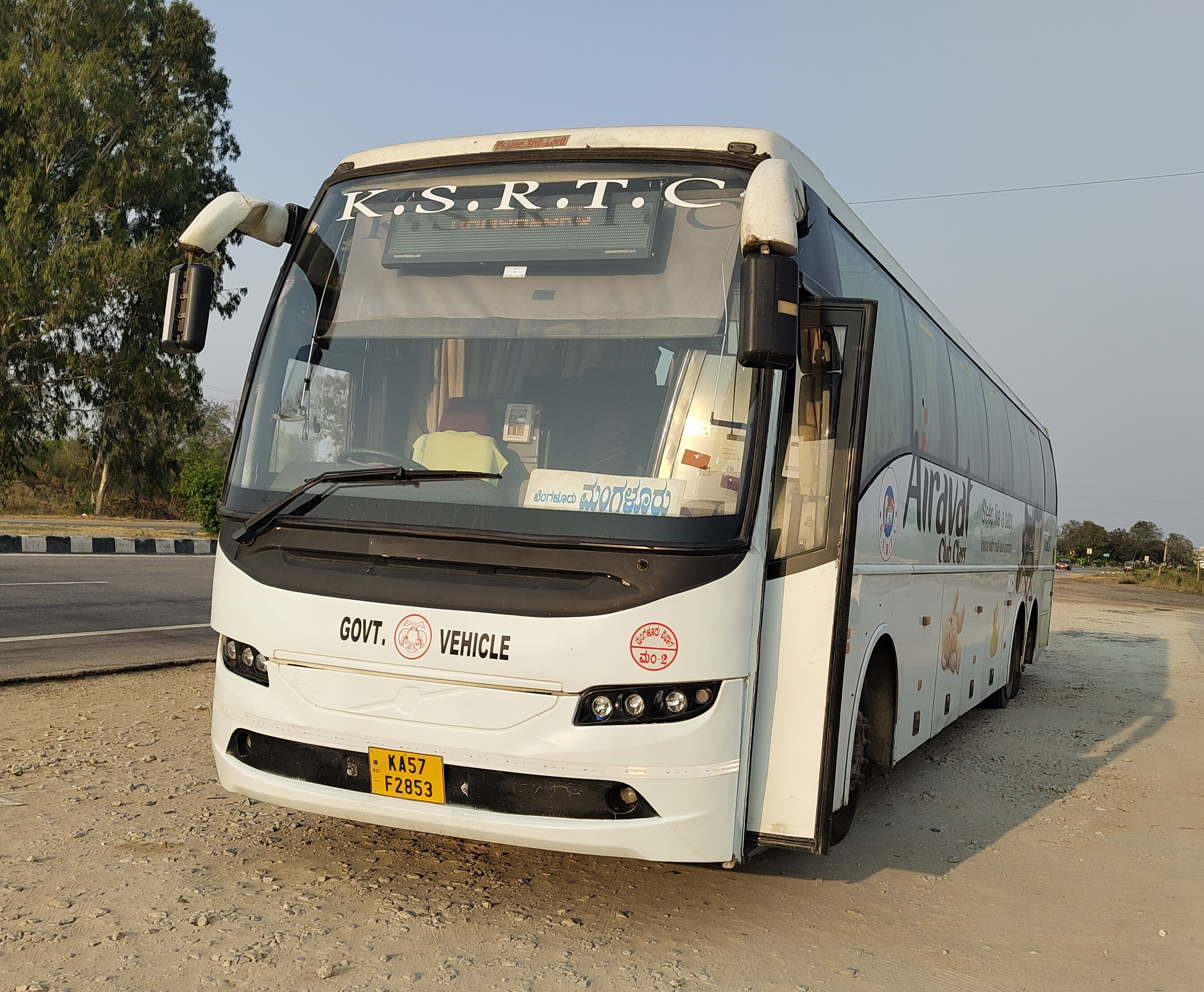
A Volvo B11R Airavat Club Class bus operated by Karnataka State Road Transport Corporation between Bengaluru and Mangaluru.

Karnataka State Road Transport Corporation (KSRTC) runs the long distance bus services from Mangalore(from Bejai bus stand) to other parts of the state. The Mangaluru-Bengaluru route is the most lucrative route and is equally served by public & private players.

The longest bus route served is the Mangaluru - Ankola- Hubli- Belgaum- Pune- Mumbai bus route run by a number of private players and KSRTC. The journey is about 22 hours by normal buses & 16 hours by Volvo Buses.

Many private companies based out of Mangaluru, Udupi, Bengaluru also ply multiple buses between Mangaluru and other cities on daily basis. Ganesh Travels, SRS Travels, Ideal Travels, Sugama Tourists, Durgamba Motors, VRL, and Aero Bus being the popular operators. These operators provide services in different categories such as A/C Volvo Bus, Sleeper, Seater etc. There will be a huge hike in number of passengers during the festive seasons such as Mangaluru Dasara, Diwali, Ganesh Chaturthi, Christmas which will also result in hike in bus fares unlike the KSRTC buses.

== Roads and Highways ==
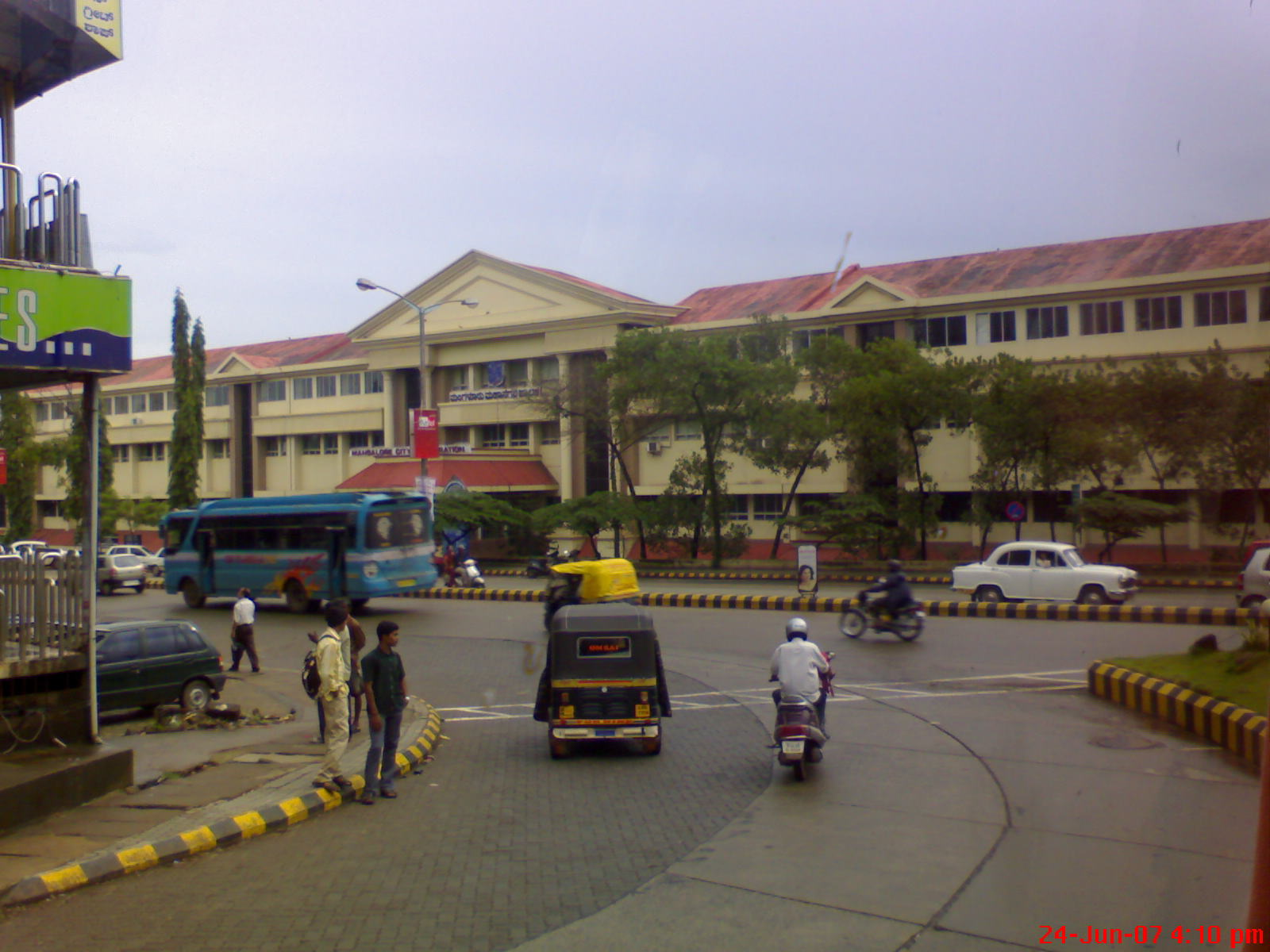
MG Road - Bejai Road junction in Mangaluru

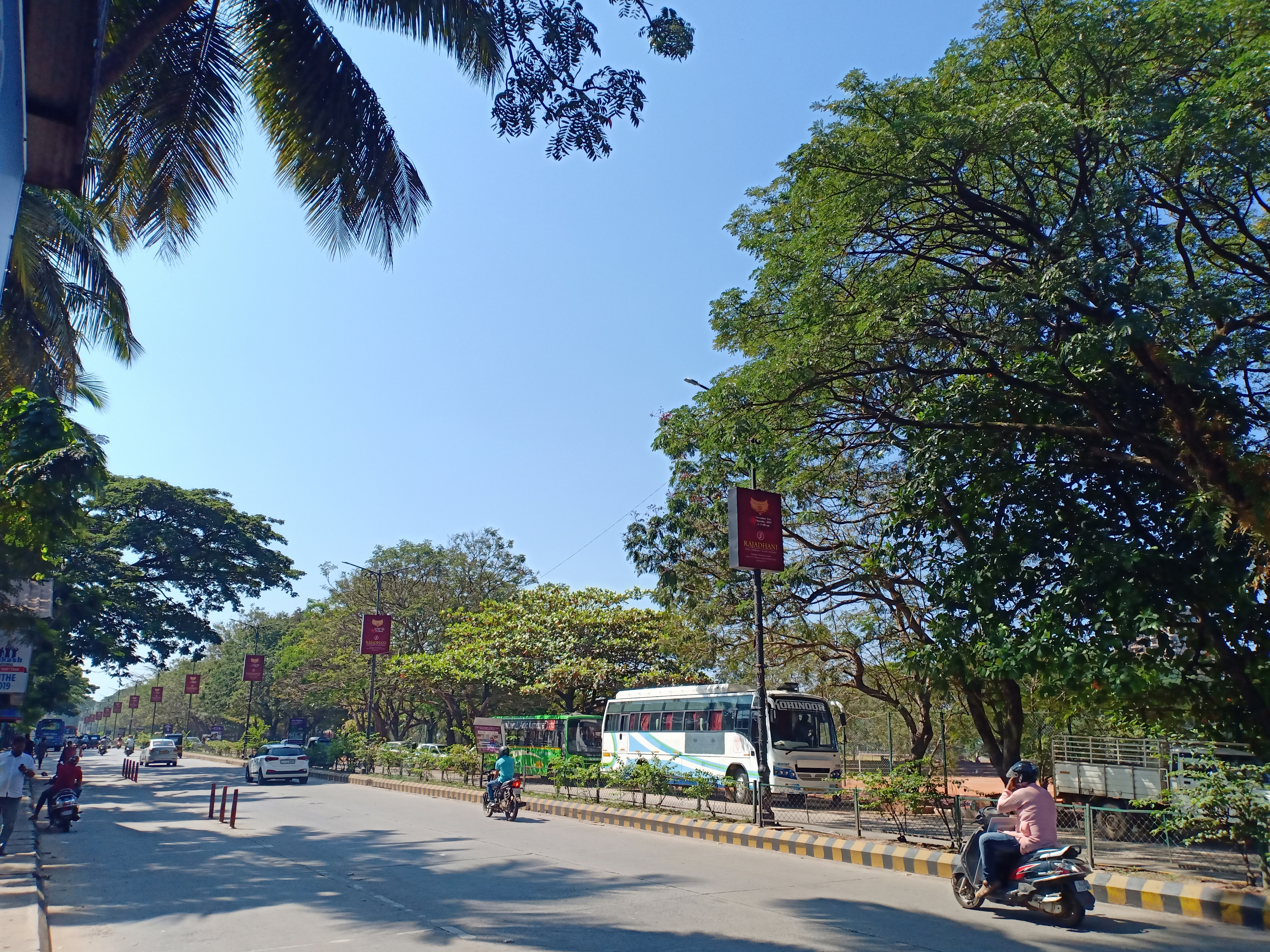
Clock Tower to Nehru Maidan Road

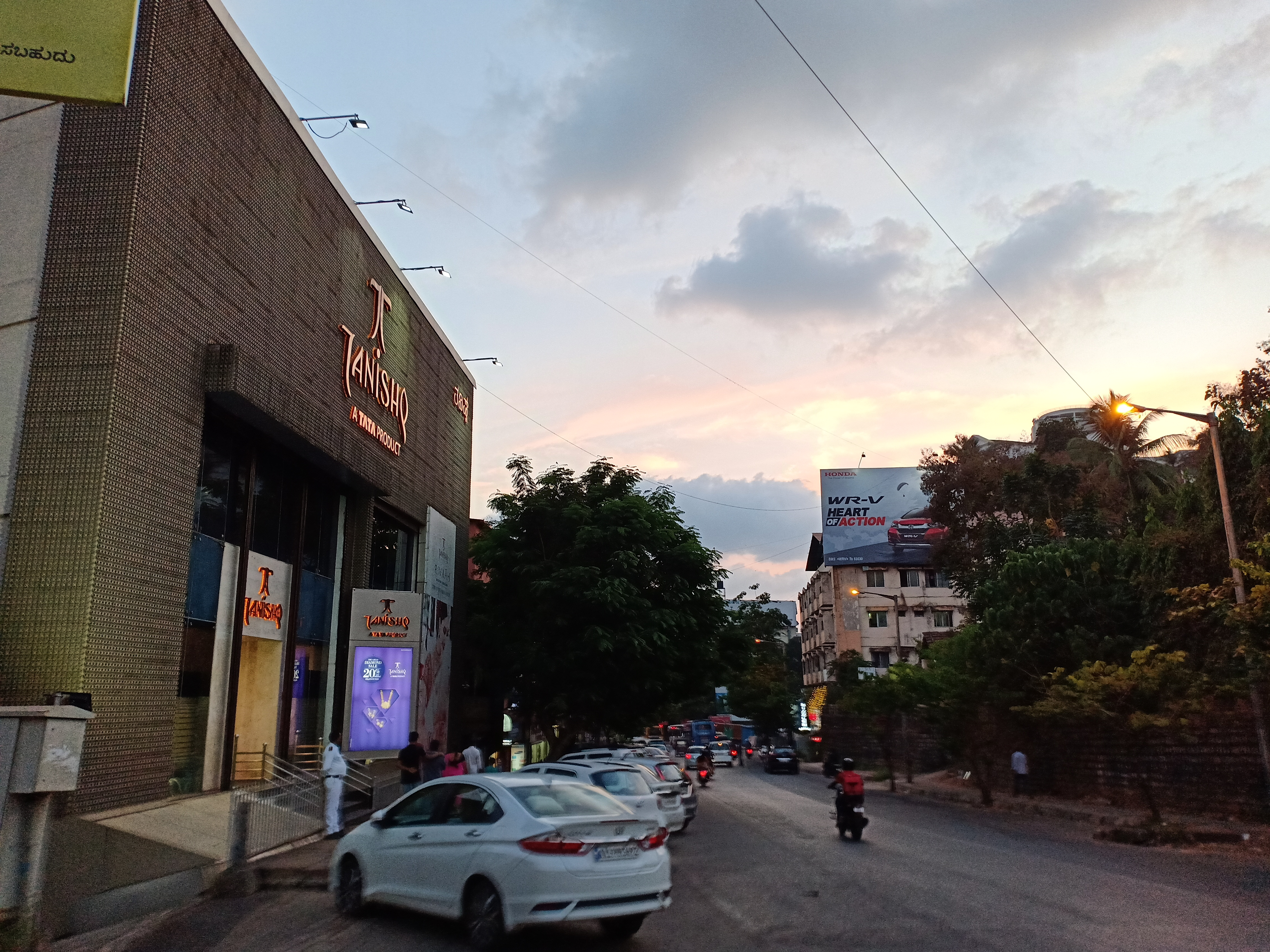
Balmatta Road in Mangalore

Five national highways connect Mangalore with various parts of Karnataka and India.

- NH-17 (now NH-66) connects Mangaluru with Udupi, Bhatkal, Karwar, Mumbai, Goa, Kochi, Trivandrum and Kozhikode.
- NH-13 (now NH-169) connects with Shimoga.
- NH-48 (now NH-75) connects with Vellore, Bangalore, Kunigal, Hassan and Sakleshpura.
- NH-73 connects to Tumkur via Charmadi, Mudigere and Belur.
- NH-275 also connects with Bengaluru via Mysuru. It starts at Bantwal near Mangaluru and passes through Madikeri, Mysore and Mandya. It ends at Bengaluru spanning a total length of 378 kilometres (235 mi).

== Railways ==
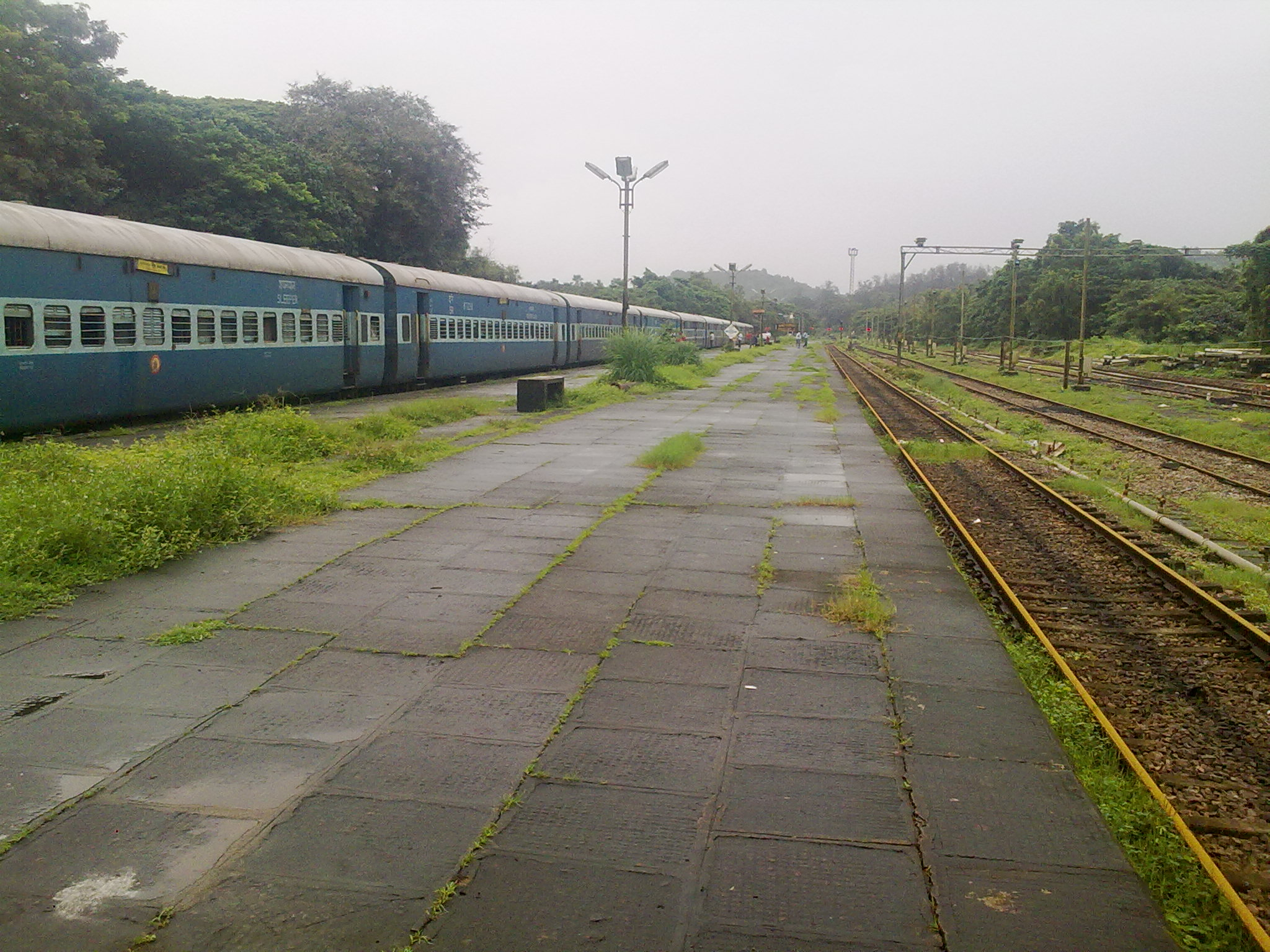
Mangalore Junction railway station

Mangalore has 3 railway stations - Mangalore Central, Mangalore Junction & Surathkal railway station.

A metre gauge railway track was built through the Western Ghats in the east, connecting Mangalore with Hassan. The broad gauge track connecting Mangalore to Bangalore via Hassan is open for freight traffic since May 2006. While the movement of passenger traffic was supposed to start after December 2006, the inaugural train was eventually flagged off from Mangalore Central railway station for Bengaluru only on 8 December 2007 by Union Minister for Railways Laloo Prasad Yadav.

When India gained independence, Mangaluru was not connected to Mumbai by rail. The railway network established before independence terminated at Mangalore. Since then there had been a strong need to connect Mangaluru to Mumbai and hence the Konkan Railway came into being. The project was completed in 1998 and since then the travel time to the north of the country has come down considerably and provides a convenient alternative for passengers.

Mangaluru has direct trains to Mumbai, Chennai, Thiruvananthapuram, Kochi, Kollam(Quilon), Coimbatore, Hyderabad, Puducherry, Nagercoil through the Southern Railway and to Mumbai, Bhatkal, Karwar,Thane and Goa via the Konkan Railway. Navyug Express train connects Mangalore with Katra in Jammu and Kashmir. Thiruvananthapuram Rajdhani Express connects Mangalore with the national capital New Delhi.

== Sea ==
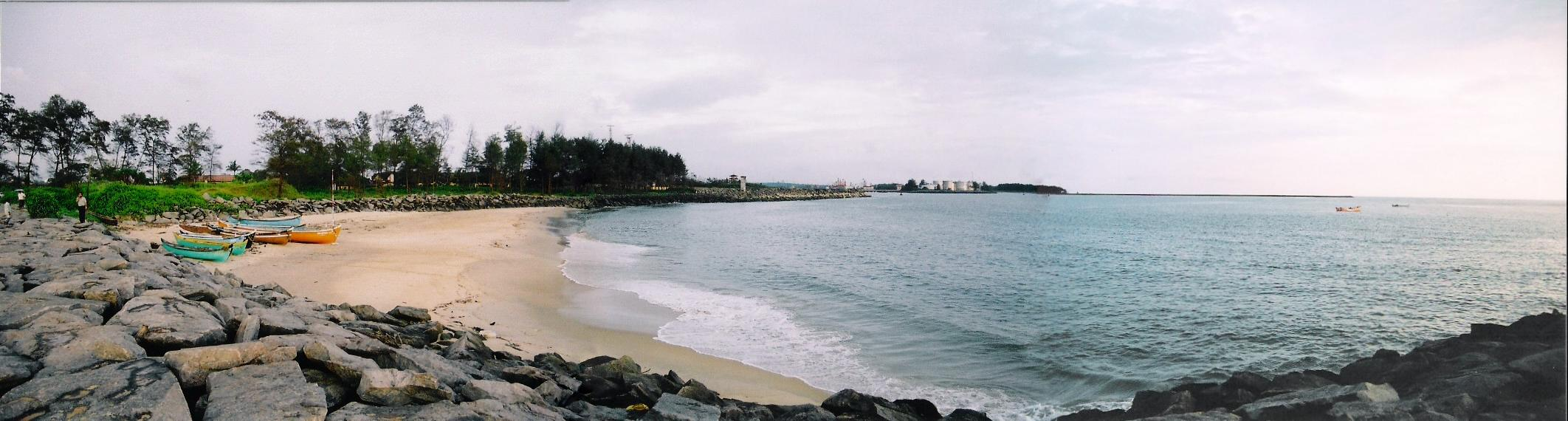
Sea entrance to New Mangalore Port

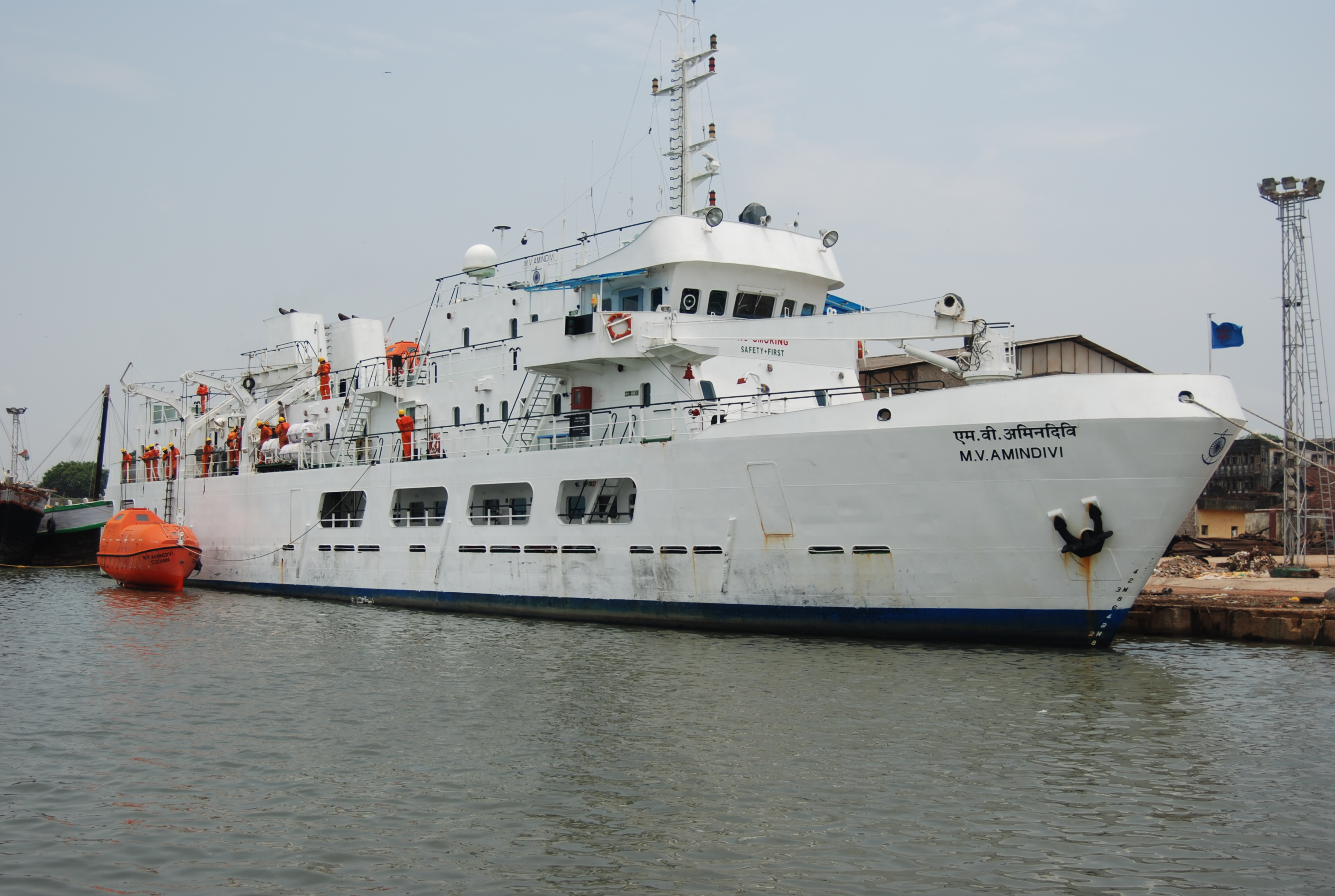
M.V. Amindivi, a passenger ship of the Lakshadweep Islands administration docked at the Old Mangalore Port.

The Mangaluru Harbour provides a connection by sea to the rest of the world. Currently dry, bulk and fluid cargos are handled by the New Mangalore Port, providing an important gateway to the state of Karnataka. It is also the station for the Coast Guard and has a unit of CISF. This modern artificial harbour 10 km north of the Central Business District (CBD), is now India's eight largest cargo handling port.

Various cruise ships such as Regent Seven Seas, Norwegian Star, Oceania, Celebrity, Costa, AIDA, Nautica and Royal Caribbean International have visited the New Mangalore Port. Foreigners can enter Mangalore through the New Mangalore Port with the help of Electronic visa (e-visa). Cruise ships from Europe, North America and UAE arrive at New Mangalore Port to visit the tourist places around Mangalore.

== Air ==
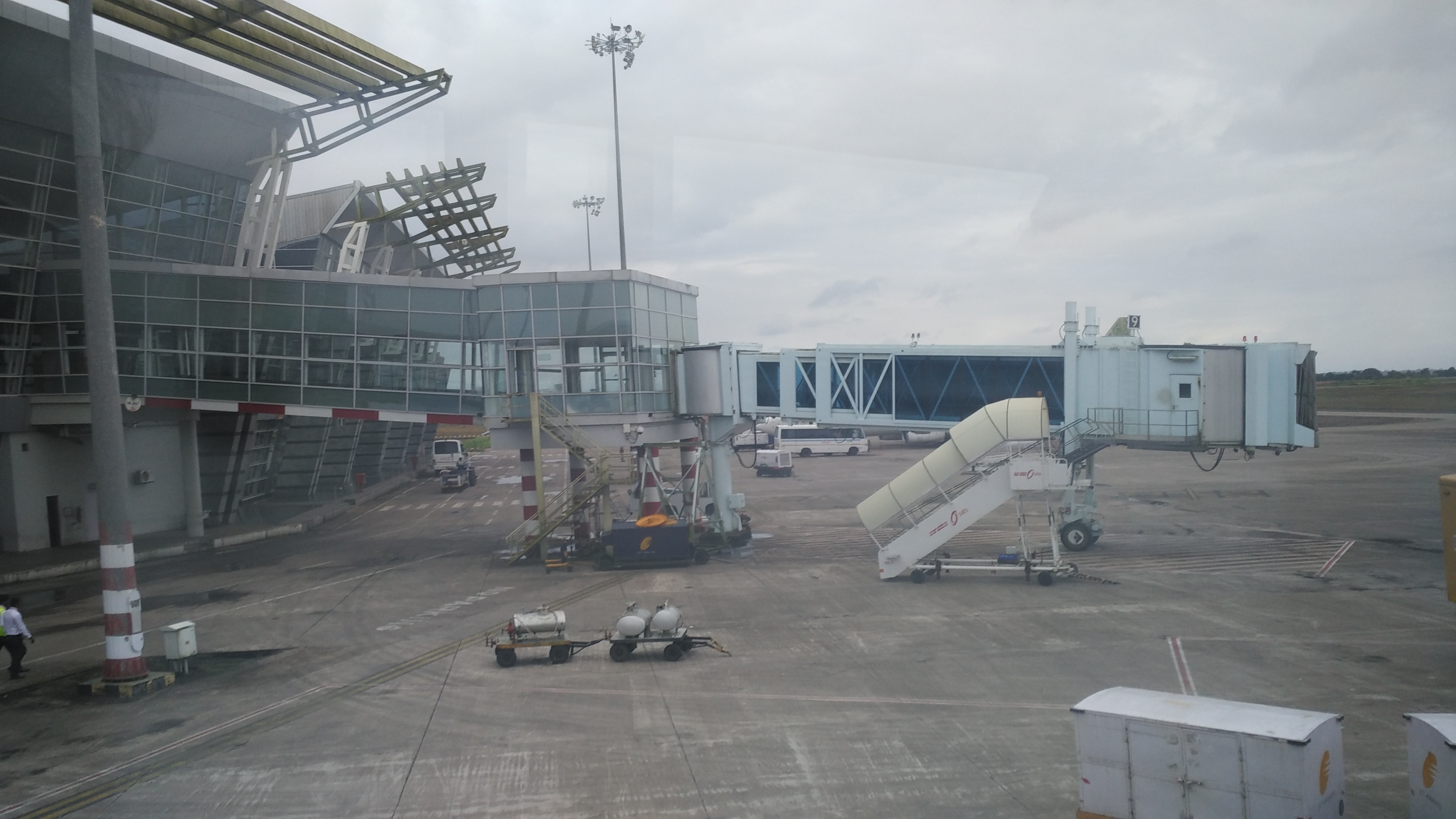
Mangalore International Airport jet bridge

Mangalore International Airport (IATA: IXE) is located near Bajpe, around 14 km north-east of the city. It is the second-largest and second-busiest airport in Karnataka. New terminals and runways at the airport accommodate both cargo and passenger requirements. State-government-run buses connect the city with the airport. The new terminal which had commenced operations in mid-2009 is 8 km from the city. The Airport connects Mangalore with Indian cities such as Mumbai, Bangalore, Chennai, Delhi, Hyderabad, Pune and Visakhapatnam. The Airport also connects Mangalore with countries such as UAE, Bahrain, Qatar, Oman, Saudi Arabia and Kuwait.

Airport has seen double digit growth in passenger traffic after introducing international flights. As of 2014, the airport had a growth of 21.51 per cent in passenger handling during 2013–14, with 54 per cent growth in international traffic. It has handled 1,255,000 passengers in 2013–14 against 1,032,000 in 2012–13. The airport is expected to handle 900,000 passengers in 2025.
