= Westerbroek railway stop =

Railway station in the Netherlands

Westerbroek

General information
- Location: Westerbroek; Netherlands
- Coordinates: 53°10′38″N 6°40′11″E
- Line: Harlingen–Nieuweschans railway
- Train operators: Staatsspoorwegen

Other information
- Station code: Wte

History
- Opened: 1 January 1905
- Closed: 22 May 1932
Location
- Location within Netherlands

Westerbroek (Dutch pronunciation: [ˈʋɛstərˌbruk]; abbreviation: Wte) was a railway stop (Dutch: stopplaats) in the village of Westerbroek in the Netherlands. It was situated on the Harlingen–Nieuweschans railway between the railway stations of Groningen and Kropswolde. Train services started on 1 January 1905 and were operated by the Maatschappij tot Exploitatie van Staatsspoorwegen (Company for Exploitation of State Railways). The railway stop was closed on 22 May 1932.
