= Rangatira (disambiguation) =

A rangatira is a chief among the Māori of New Zealand.

Rangatira may also refer to:

- Rangatira (Cook Islands), a minor chief among the Cook Islanders.
- Rangatira Island, in the Chatham Archipelago, New Zealand.
- Rangatira Moetara (died 1880), Māori chief born as Rangatira

== Ships ==
- TEV Rangatira (1930), a New Zealand ferry in service 1931–1965.
- TEV Rangatira (1971), the world's last TEV ferry, in service in New Zealand 1972-76, later an accommodation/barracks ship Scotland and Falklands, finally a Mediterranean ferry.

== See also ==
- Tino rangatiratanga, literally "chieftainship", in Māori affairs
- Te Heke-rangatira-ki-Nukutaurua Boyd (1886–1959), a Māori tribal leader
