= Lyttelton (steam tug) =

Historic Tug Boat

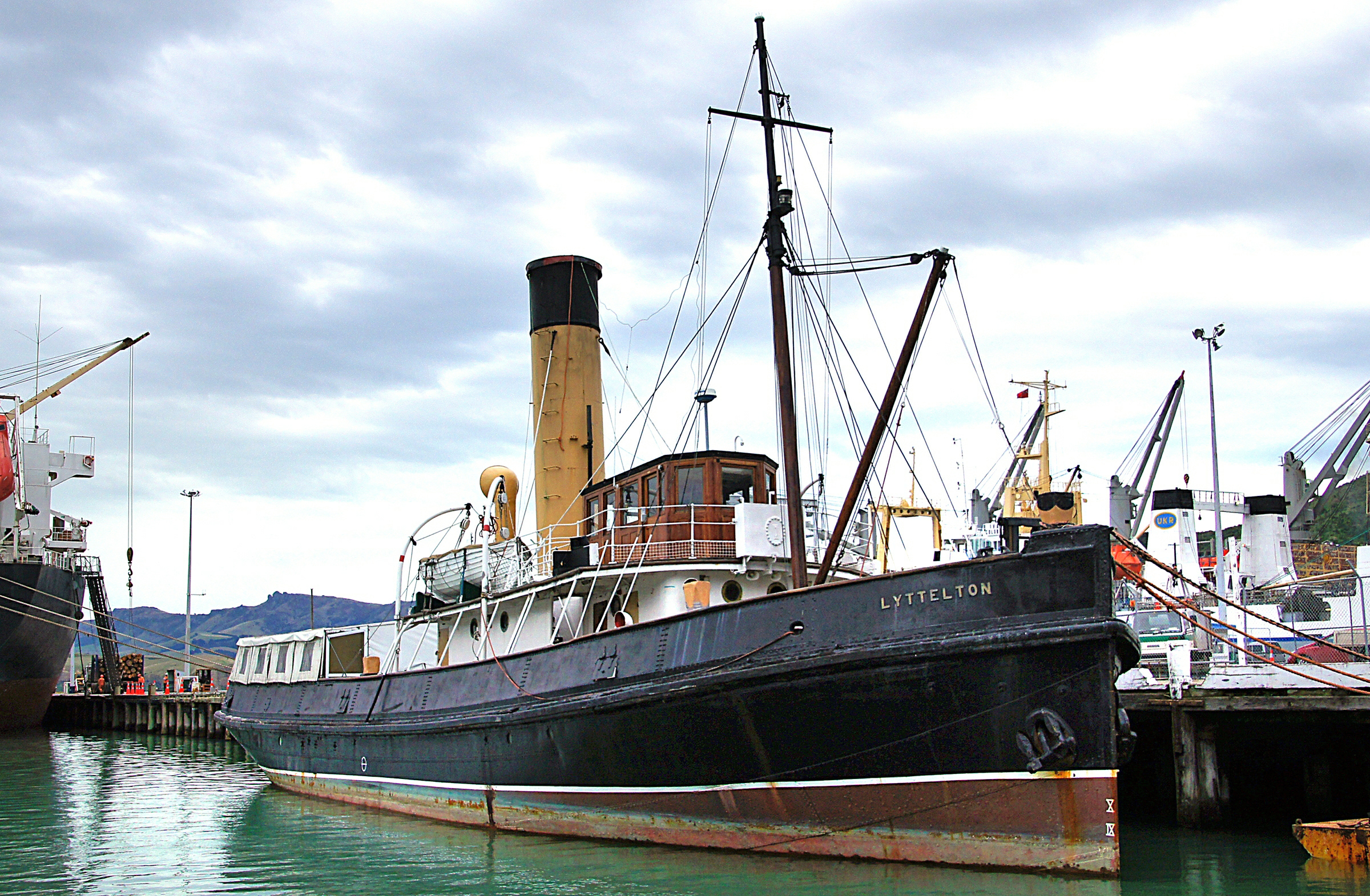
- Lyttelton anchored in port

History
- Name: Lyttelton (1911–1942, 1944–present); HMNZS Lyttelton (1942–1944); Canterbury (1907–1911)
- Owner: Tug Lyttelton Preservation Society (1989–present); Lyttelton Harbour Board (1907–1989)
- Port of registry: Lyttelton, New Zealand
- Ordered: 1906
- Builder: Ferguson Brothers, Glasgow
- Cost: £14,126 (1907)
- Yard number: 174
- In service: 1907–1971; 1973–present
- Identification: 76079
- Fate: In service

General characteristics
- Type: Steam tug
- Tonnage: 292 GRT (as built)
- Length: 38 m (124 ft 8 in)
- Installed power: steam engine 800 hp (600 kW)
- Propulsion: twin screw
- Speed: 12.4 knots (23.0 km/h; 14.3 mph)
- Capacity: 130 crew and passengers
- Crew: 9–19

Lyttelton, built in 1907 as Canterbury is a historic steam tug in Lyttelton, New Zealand. She was ordered by the Lyttelton Harbour Board in 1906 as a replacement for the earlier iron paddle tug Lyttelton, built in 1878.

== History ==
Built by the Ferguson Brothers firm in Port Glasgow, Scotland, she was able to reach a maximum speed of 12.414 knots (22.991 km/h; 14.286 mph) during her sea trials. She left Port Glasgow on 2 July 1907 with a crew of 15 for a 69-day voyage through the Suez Canal to reach New Zealand, arriving on 10 September. After a brief period of painting and preparation for service, on 18 September she was handed over to the harbour board, serving not just as the harbour's tug but also as its pilot boat and as a fireboat. She was berthed at No.2 wharf, where she has been based most of her life. In August 1911, with the soon to be arrival of the suction dredge Canterbury, the Lyttelton Harbour Board approved for the change of the vessel's name to her current Lyttelton, with the change being formalized in October 1911.

In 1913, she drew crowds bringing in the battlecruiser HMS New Zealand into harbour; and in 1920 assisting the battlecruiser HMS Renown, carrying Edward, Prince of Wales, into the harbour.

In 1939, the tug was relegated to secondary roles following the arrival of the larger tug Lyttelton II. On 29 December 1940 the ferry Rangatira ran aground at in dense fog. Shortly after her grounding, Lyttelton and the Union Company cargo vessel Waimarino, neither of which had radar, located Rangatira aground in Pigeon Bay. After Waimarino unloaded the 750 passengers of Rangatira, Lyttelton along with the assistance of another Union Company vessel, Karitane, helped the ferry float free at high tide.

Following the beginning of World War II, in 1942 the tug was requisitioned for service by the Royal New Zealand Navy, being armed with Bren guns and depth charges, and given the prefix HMNZS Lyttelton of a commissioned warship. By 1944, she returned to port service as Lyttelton.

In 1971, following the introduction of the new tug Canterbury, it was decided to retire Lyttelton. Following this, she was leased for the sum of $2 a year to the "Tug Lyttelton Preservation Society", being preserved as a museum ship. In 1989 the tug was gifted to the society by the Lyttelton Harbour Board. She is still in operation, being maintained and operated by the society.

Lyttelton is one of the few remaining steam-powered ships still in operation in New Zealand, alongside the tug William C Daldy in Auckland, PS Waimarie on the Whanganui River, TSS Earnslaw on Lake Wakatipu, and the floating crane Hikitia in Wellington.
