= SS Puke =

New Zealand steamship

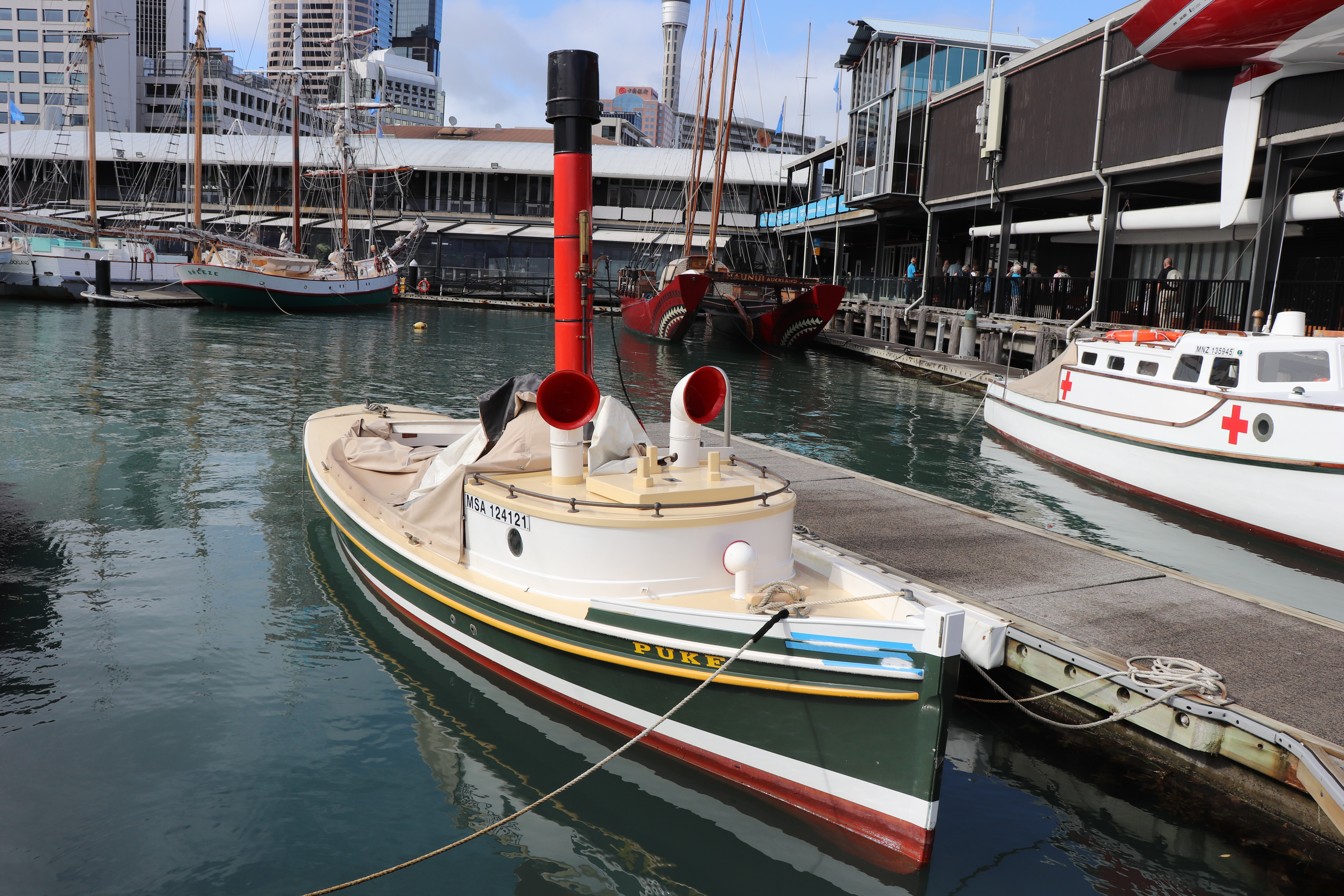
- Steamship Puke berthed at the New Zealand Maritime Museum

History

New Zealand
- Name: Puke
- Owner: 1870s–1977: Unknown; 1977–1989: Alan Brimblecombe; 1989–present: New Zealand Maritime Museum
- Port of registry: Auckland, New Zealand
- Builder: E. Thompson and Son

General characteristics
- Type: Steam launch
- Tonnage: 2.4 tonnes
- Length: 26 ft (7.9 m)
- Beam: 6 ft (1.8 m)
- Draught: 0.75 m (2.5 ft)
- Speed: Approx. 7 knots (13 km/h; 8.1 mph)
- Crew: 2

SS Puke is a steamship used for local transport. Initially named Wai Awa, it is known as New Zealand's oldest working steamboat. It now part of the working fleet in the New Zealand Maritime Museum Hui Te Ananui a Tangaroa and berthed in Auckland. The name Puke is shortened from the te reo Māori word kaipuke, meaning ship. It can also mean to swell up or rise.

== History ==
Not much is known about the first 100 years of Puke's history. Puke was built in the late 19th century, possibly by boat builders Erik Thompson and son Charlie Thompson sometime between 1870 and 1875. It is constructed out of kauri, has a beam of 6 feet (1.8 m) and is 26 feet (7.9 m) long. The Thompsons had built hundreds of boats of similar nature, along with whaling boats, sailboats, and other commercial and recreational launches. They had also built the whalers the Ernest Shackleton used on his expedition to the Antarctic.

The vessel was built at Aratapu on the Wairoa River, a timber milling town. During this time, it was known as Wai Awa. It was used in the kauri trade to tow logs. It is described as being "[...] typical of the small craft used for local transport on the Kaipara and other Northland harbours and rivers."

It was salvaged by steamboat enthusiast Alan Brimblecombe in 1977, who then restored it. Brimblecombe also restored similar late 19th-century kauri steamer Settler and another kauri steamer Zeltic built in 1903. After it was salvaged the ship worked on the Waikato, Ohinemuri, and Waihou rivers. Puke spent six years at the Historical Maritime Park in Paeroa, where Brimblecombe was curator. In 1988, Puke spent six months at the World Expo 88 in Brisbane, Australia, where it carried passengers on the Brisbane River. Notable guests include the Māori queen Te Arikinui Dame Te Atairangikaahu, Queen Elizabeth II and Sir Edmund Hillary.

Brimblecombe had also exhibited Puke at the Historic Boat Show for ten days as part of Auckland's Fiesta festival were a number of boats were on display at Princes Wharf in Auckland.

The year following the World Expo, Puke was gifted to the New Zealand Maritime Museum by the Union Steam Ship Company. It underwent some changes, such as new paint in the green and red to reflect the company colours. Puke was part of the Maritime Museum's opening ceremony, which also included other steamships such as William C Daldy and Rapaki. Bearings, the Maritime Museum's former serial, writes that "The Union Company chose this vessel as a way to mark the concurrence of the New Zealand and Auckland sesquicentennial and World Maritime Heritage Year."

Puke had also appeared in commercials and auditioned for a role in a New Zealand television series. It was also featured in Steam Torque, the Auckland Steam Engine Society Incorporated serial across multiple issues.

== Specifications ==
Puke has a maximum capacity of five passengers and two crew, one master and one engineer. Its engine is from A&G Price. When initially purchased for the Maritime Museum, it has a petrol powered steam engines. It was replaced with an internal combustion engine.

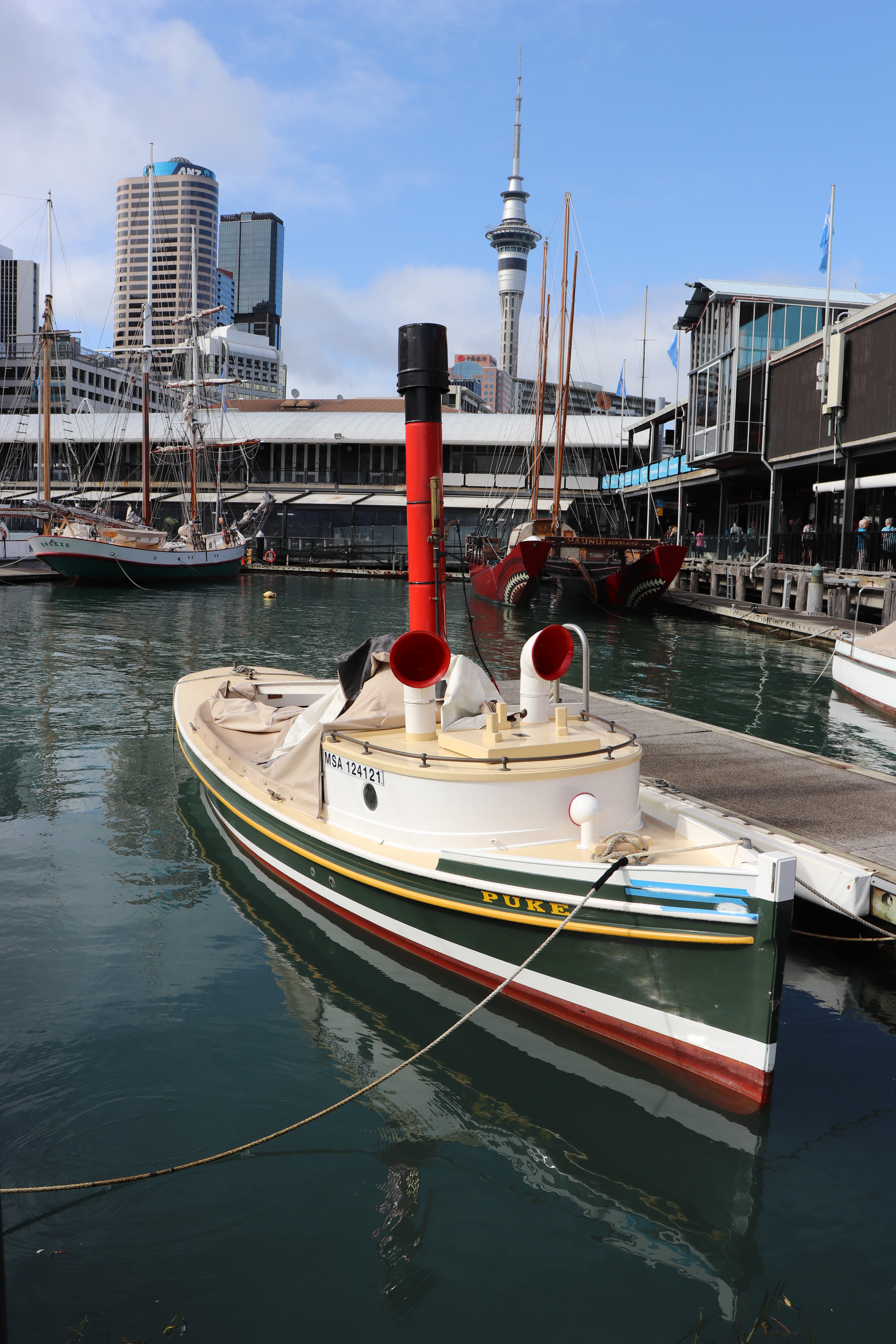
SS Puke berthed at the New Zealand Maritime Museum

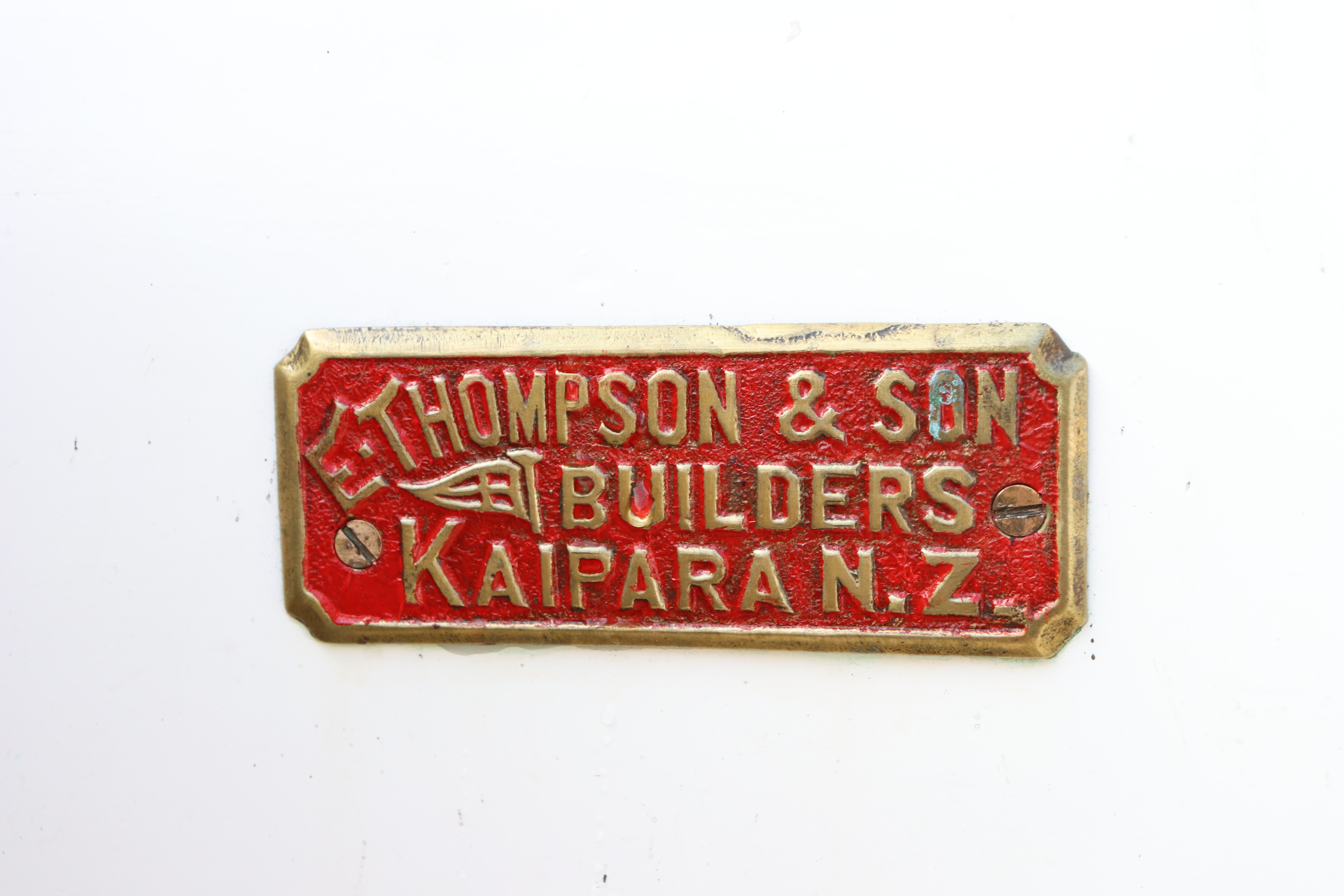
Maker plate on SS Puke. Text "E. Thompson & Son Builders Kaipara N.Z."

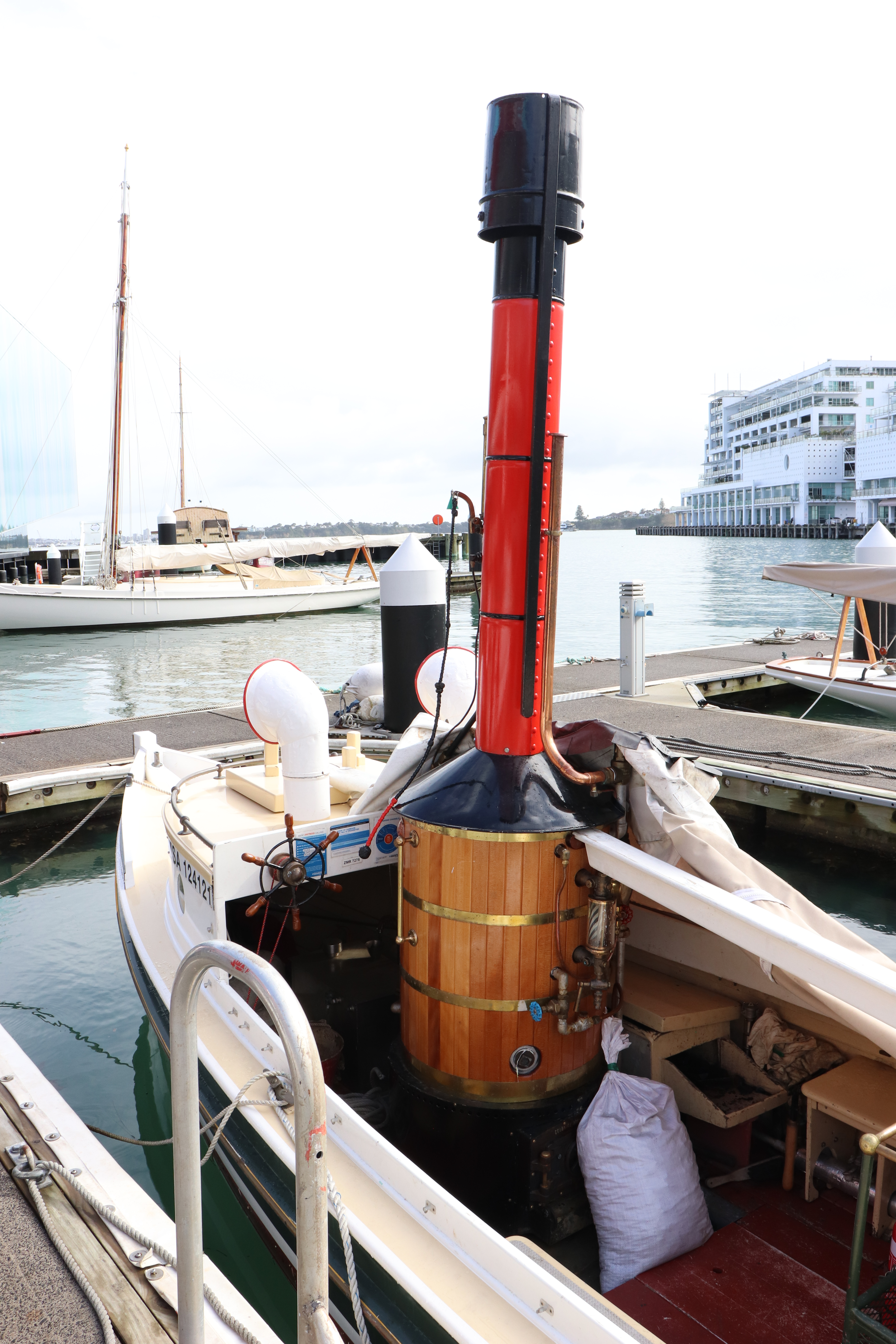
Boiler on SS Puke

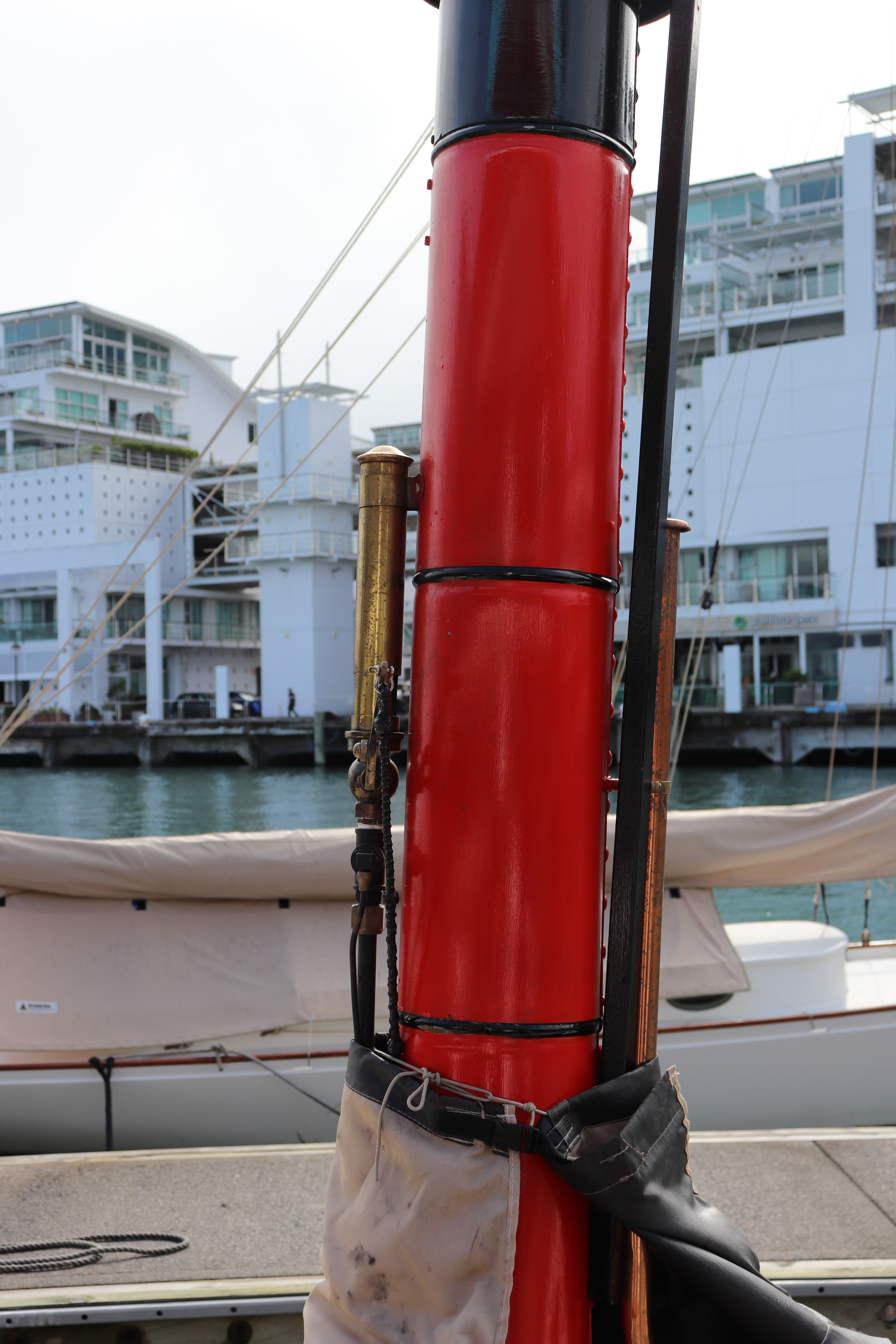
Close up of whistle on SS Puke

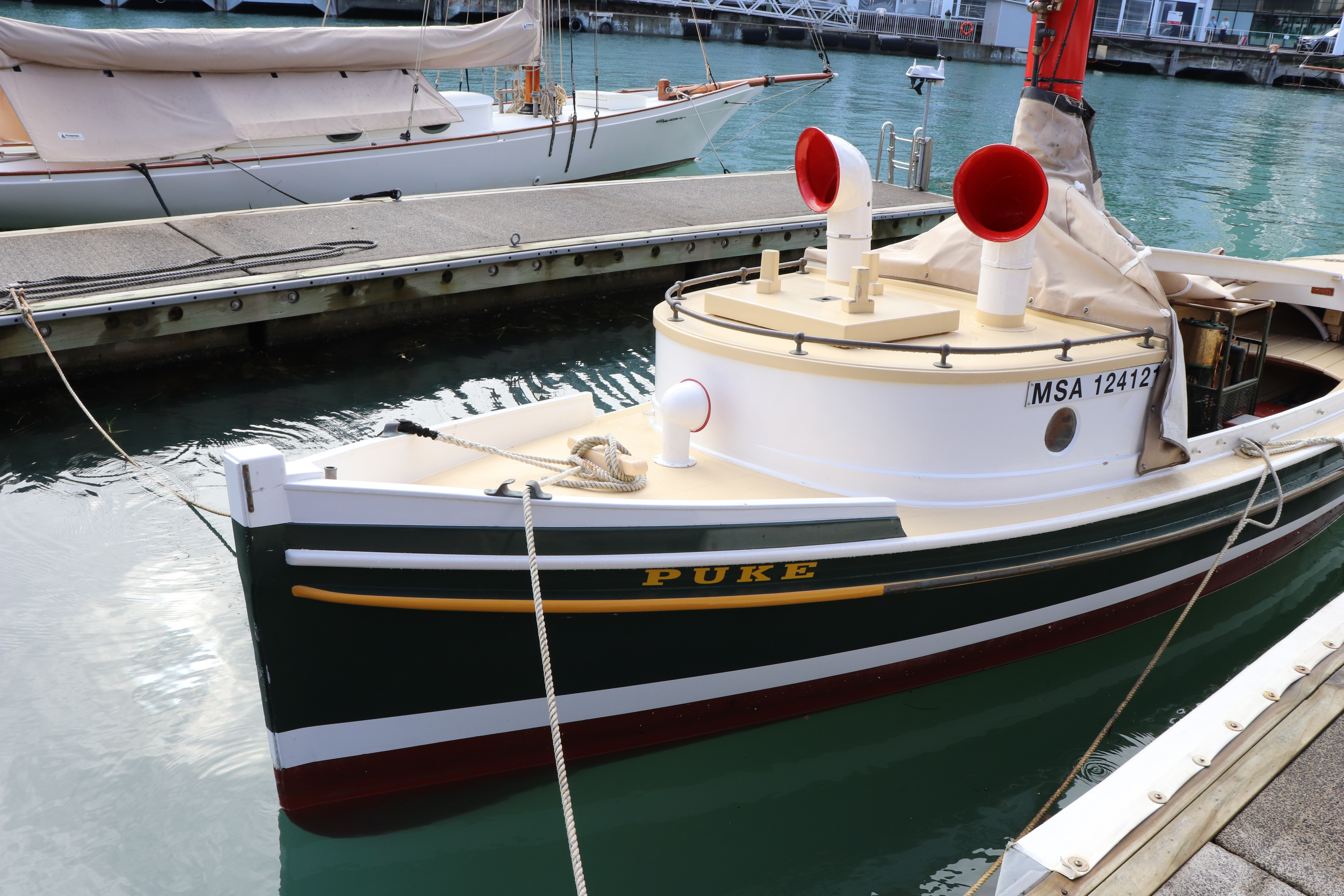
SS Puke
