= Compagnie Tunisienne de Navigation =

Tunisian shipping line

Tunisian Navigation Company الشركة التونسية للملاحة (CTN)
- Industry: Shipping
- Founded: 1959
- Headquarters: Tunis, Tunisia
- Area served: Mediterranean Sea
- Services: Passenger transportation Freight transportation
- Website: www.ctn.com.tn

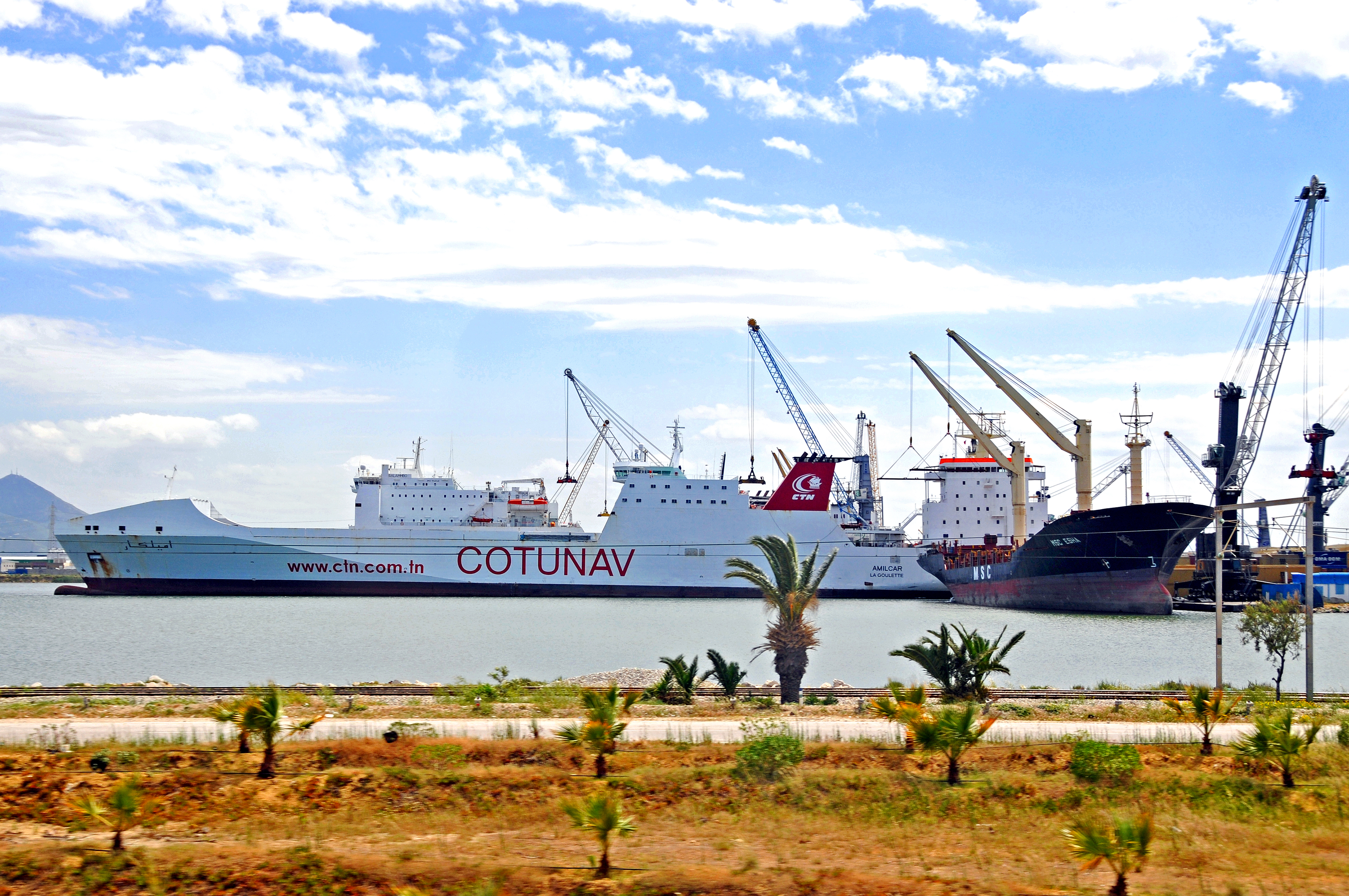
A COTUNAV cargo ship Amilcar in Tunis harbor, 2012

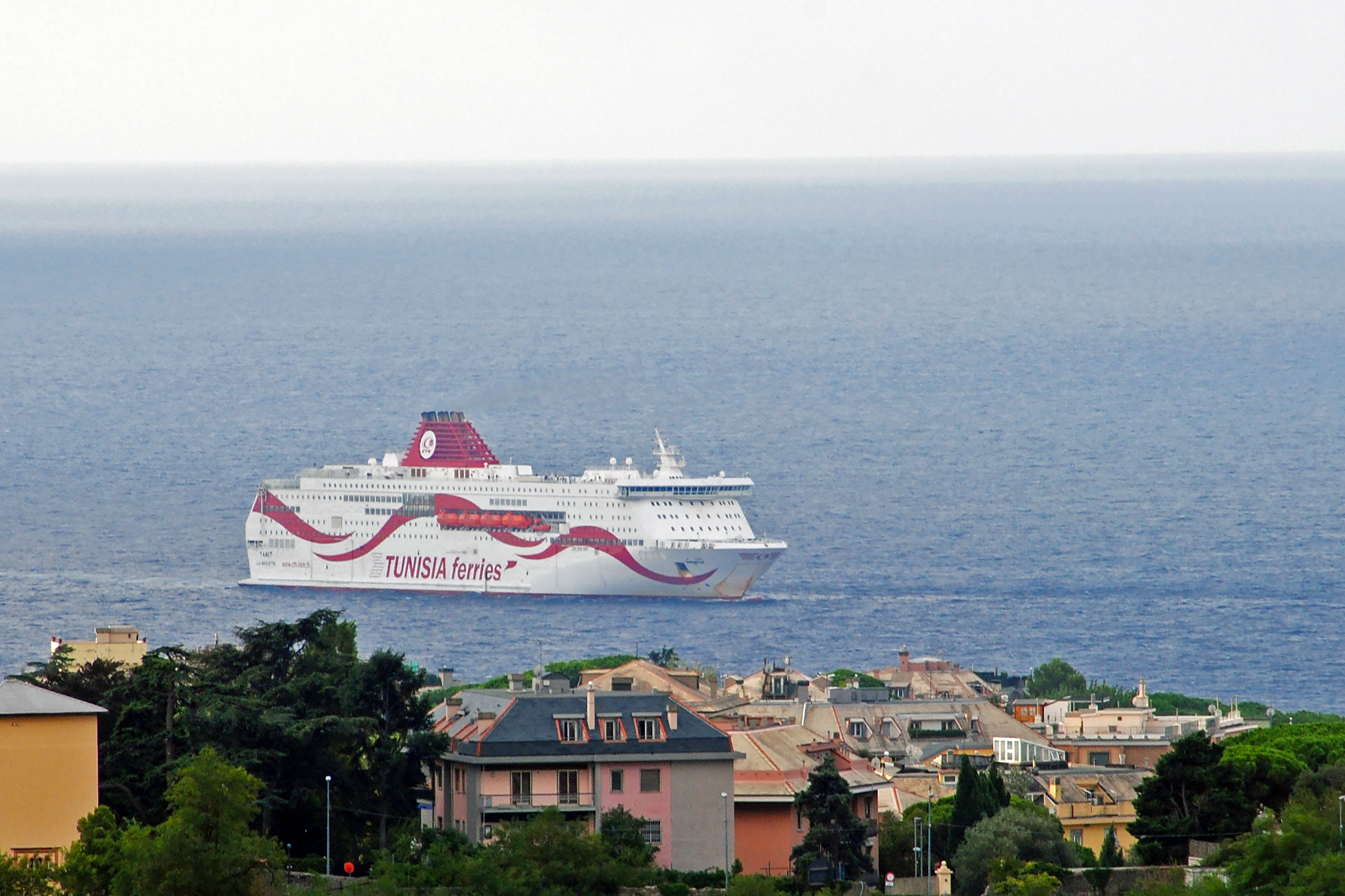
The Tanit ferry sailing towards the port of Genoa.

The Compagnie Tunisienne de Navigation (CTN or COTUNAV) is a Tunisian shipping line, providing regular passenger ferry connections between Tunisia and the ports of Marseille and Genoa, as well as freight transport to Barcelona and Livorno. It is fully owned by the Tunisian state and under the supervision of the Ministry of Transport.

Founded on 7 March 1959, it initially concentrated on the development of regular shipping links between Tunisia and its principal trading partners, essentially serving only Marseille and Rouen. However, with the drive to diversify Tunisian overseas trade, it rapidly expanded its route network to encompass ports in Italy, Spain, Germany and the Benelux countries.

In the 1970s CTN expanded its presence in the transport of crude oil, petroleum products and foodstuffs. With the commissioning in 1978 of the ferry Habib, providing service between Tunis, Marseille and Genoa, it also increased its involvement in passenger transport. CTN expanded its fleet by buying the bulk carriers Moularès and S’hib in 1976–77 and El-Kef in 1982.

Moving to roll-on/roll-off service, CTN turned to the renewal of its fleet, taking delivery of El-Jem and Tozeur in 1977, and of Bizerte and Kairouan in 1979. For the summers of 1990, 1991 and 1992 CTN also chartered the turbo-electric ship Carlo R from the Sicilian company Alimar.

Forced to re-evaluate its activities in the light of recent changes in the maritime world, CTN has gradually sold its older ships in order to refocus attention on its core businesses. It is gradually renewing its fleet with the commissioning of two large ro-ro ships of 18,000 tons: Ulysse and Salammbô 7. In June 1999, the line’s new Norwegian-built ferry Carthage came into service. Capable of accommodating 2,208 passengers and 666 cars, and with a speed of 23.5 knots (43.5 km/h), it makes weekly crossings between Tunis and Marseille and Tunis and Genoa.

In 2012, CTN received the new ferry Tanit built by DSME. Capable of accommodating 3,200 passengers and 1,060 Vehicles, with a speed of 27.5 knots (50.9 km/h). As a consequence of this addition, the Habib and El-Kef were decommissioned in 2013.

== Fleet ==
CTN operates a fleet of six vessels consisting of four RORO and two ROPAX ferries. In addition to its fleet, CTN currently charters two RORO vessels.

=== Current fleet ===
Name	Built	Enterered service	Tonnage	Information
Amilcar	2000	2010	22,900 GT	
Carthage	1999	1999	32,298 GT	
Elyssa	2000	2010	22,900 GT	
Tanit	2012	2012	52 645 GT	
Salammbo 7	1997	1997	17,907 GT	
Ulysse	1997	1997	17,907 GT	
Leevsten	2019	2020	32,887 GT	Chartered since 2020.
Stena Shipper	2012	2022	29,429 GT	Chartered since 2022.
Kraftca	2006	2025	28,289 GT	Chartered since 2025.
