= TEV Rangatira =

History
- Name: Rangatira (1972–1986); Queen M (1986–1990); Carlo R (1990–2001); Alexander the Great (2001–2005)
- Namesake: (1972–1986): Māori for; "chief, wellborn, noble"; (2001–2005) Alexander the Great
- Owner: Union Steam Ship Company (U.K.) Ltd, London(1972–1986); Searoyal Ferries (1986–1990); Rodriquez Group/Alimar (1990–2001); Oberon Cruise Line (2001–2005)
- Operator: Union Steam Ship Co of NZ (1972–1976); Marlines Ferries (1986–1990); COTUNAV (1990–92); Alimar (1993); Horizon Sea Lines (1994)
- Port of registry: (United Kingdom) London (1972–1986); (Cyprus) Limassol (1986–1988); (Panama) (1988–1989); (Malta) Valletta (1989–2005)
- Route: Wellington – Lyttelton (1972–1976); Tunis – Genoa/Marseille (1990–1993); Ancona – Çeşme (1994)
- Ordered: 15 May 1969
- Builder: Swan Hunter, Wallsend, England
- Yard number: 33
- Laid down: 2 April 1970
- Launched: 23 June 1971
- Completed: 1971
- Maiden voyage: 28 March 1972
- In service: 28 March 1972
- Out of service: 16 August 1995
- Home port: Wellington (1972–1976)
- Identification: IMO number: 7111731
- Fate: Scrapped in 2005.

General characteristics
- Type: Roll-on/roll-off ferry; (1972–76; 1986–95); accommodation ship (1977–82); barracks ship (1982–83)
- Tonnage: 9,387.26 GRT; 4,030.69 NRT
- Length: 500 ft 4 in (152.50 m) or 500.8 ft (152.63 m)
- Beam: 72.4 ft (22.08 m)
- Draught: 17.34 ft (5.284 m)
- Decks: six
- Ramps: stern only
- Propulsion: turbo-electric transmission; twin screw; bow thrusters
- Speed: 18.26 knots (33.82 km/h) average; 22.25 knots (41.21 km/h) maximum
- Capacity: as built: 768 passengers (later reduced to 733); 200 vehicles
- Troops: about 1,200 (1982–83)
- Crew: 123
- Armament: (1982–83): 4 × Oerlikon 20 mm cannon
- Aviation facilities: (1982–83): heavy-duty helicopter deck on A-deck
- Notes: twin rudders; fin stabilisers

TEV Rangatira was a roll-on/roll-off vehicle and passenger ferry launched in 1971 for the Union Steam Ship Company of New Zealand. She was the world's last surviving passenger ship with steam-powered turbo-electric transmission. (Modern turbo-electric ships, including RMS Queen Mary 2 and Millennium-class cruise ships such as Celebrity Millennium, have gas turbines.)

Rangatira had a varied existence, including serving as an accommodation ship and barracks ship between 1977 and 1983. The Union Company sold her in 1986 and she returned to being a ferry. From 1986 onwards, she passed through a succession of owners who renamed her three times and registered her under three different flags of convenience: as Queen M in 1986, Carlo R in 1990 and Alexander the Great in 2001.

After a failed attempt to convert the vessel into a cruise ship she was scrapped in 2005.

== Name ==
Rangatira is Māori for "chief (male or female), wellborn, noble". The 1971 ship is at least the sixth to carry the name. The first Rangatira was in service between Great Britain and New Zealand by 1857. The second was an iron-hulled steamship built in 1863 and wrecked in 1880. The third was a Shaw Savill Line steamship built in 1890 and sold and renamed in 1909. The fourth was a Shaw Savill Line steamship built in 1909 and wrecked in 1916. The fifth was the Union Company ferry TEV Rangatira (1931), a turbo-electric ship that was in service from 1931 to 1967.

== Building and delivery ==
The Union Company ordered the new Rangatira from Swan Hunter of Wallsend, England on 15 May 1969. She was launched on 23 June 1971 by June Blundell and undertook initial sea trials on 20 September or 20 December. Her completion was delayed by an industrial dispute at Swan Hunter so she was fitted out at Southampton, England. She was delivered to Union Steam Ship Company (UK) Ltd in January 1972 and sailed from England on 16 February carrying a cargo of motor cars. On 18 March she reached Wellington, New Zealand and discharged her cargo.

The new Rangatira had turbo-electric transmission, with twin turbo generators and electric propulsion motors built by AEI of Manchester. In addition she had bow thrusters for easier berthing. Compared with the more common reduction gearing between steam turbines and propeller shafts, turbo-electric transmission has lower energy conversion efficiency and an inferior power-to-weight ratio. But it gives quicker manoeuvrability, being able to change propeller speed more quickly and also give full power astern if needed.

Rangatira was built with capacity for 768 passengers (159 fewer than her predecessor TEV Wahine) and 200 vehicles. Rangatira's overnight cabins included one 6-berth, one 10-berth and one 12-berth dormitories.

== New Zealand ferry ==
The new Rangatira was to work the 200-nautical-mile (370 km) "Steamer Express" route between Wellington on the North Island and Lyttelton on the South Island, replacing the TEV Wahine that had been wrecked in Cyclone Giselle in 1968. On 28 March 1972 she made her first voyage from Wellington across Cook Strait and along the South Island east coast to Lyttelton. On this first trip she carried a full complement of 768 passengers.

As soon as the new Rangatira was in service, the TEV Maori was withdrawn and work began to strip her of equipment. However, on 18 September Rangatira developed a serious fault with her port turbine, reached Wellington at reduced speed two and a half hours late and had to be taken out of service for repairs. The Maori was quickly re-equipped and on 20 September was returned to service until Rangatira's repairs were complete and she able to resume duty on 16 October.

On 19 June 1973 Rangatira damaged her port rudder and propeller while berthing at Lyttelton. She was taken out of service for repairs, drydocked at Wellington on 20 June and returned to service on 2 July.

On 30 October 1973 Rangatira was en route from Lyttelton to Wellington when her starboard turbine suffered damage to a thrust bearing and a rotor. She reached Wellington over two hours late but was repaired and returned to service on 2 November.

=== Financial losses, subsidy and withdrawal ===
For almost a decade the Steamer Express route had lost traffic between the North and South islands to its competitors. In 1962 New Zealand Railways had introduced its Cook Strait rail ferries on the 55-nautical-mile (102 km) route between Wellington and Picton, offering a much shorter sea crossing for freight and cars. Domestic aviation between the two islands was also expanding and becoming more affordable, especially after the New Zealand National Airways Corporation introduced Boeing 737-200 aircraft in 1968.

Before the loss of the Wahine in 1968, the Maori and the Wahine were used to provide a regular two-ship overnight service between Wellington and Lyttelton with one ship departing from each port every night and arriving early the next day at the other port. Following the loss of the Wahine, the Maori, and after 1972 the Rangatira, provided a single ship service with a night crossing in one direction followed by a day crossing in the opposite direction. The day crossings proved to be very unpopular with passengers and the less frequent and irregular service was unpopular with both passengers and freight shippers. The perception created by the loss of the Wahine that the Lyttelton to Wellington ferry service was a less safe option hastened the decline of passenger numbers.

Rangatira's long route and the high fuel consumption of her turbo-electric propulsion made her uncompetitive from the start. Running her on the Steamer Express resulted in substantial losses, which by 1974 were at a rate of NZ$4 million a year. On 1 July 1974 the NZ Ministry of Transport chartered Rangatira for six months in order to keep the service running, and on 16 February 1975 the ministry renewed her charter for 12 months. In the 12 months to 31 January 1976 Rangatira earned NZ$6.3 million but had cost NZ$10 million to operate. on 3 March 1976 Ministry of Transport renewed the charter "for a short period" until a more affordable replacement ship could be brought into service.

Rangatira worked the Steamer Express for four and a half years. In that time she made 2,096 crossings and carried a total of 832,260 passengers and 139,656 vehicles. However, that meant that her average loading per crossing was only 397 passengers (just over half capacity) and 67 vehicles (about one-third capacity).

On 14 September 1976 Rangatira left Lyttelton on her last inter-island crossing, reaching Wellington the next day. She was not replaced on the route: her withdrawal was the end of the Steamer Express service.

== Oil industry accommodation ship ==
The Union Company hoped to sell Rangatira and thought it more likely to find a buyer for her in Europe than in New Zealand. Therefore, on 17 September 1976 she left Wellington to return to Britain to be laid up. She sailed via Papeete on Tahiti and through the Panama Canal, reaching Falmouth, Cornwall, England on 17 October.

=== Loch Kishorn ===
In 1977 a Norwegian company, Sea Truck Trading of Stavanger, chartered Rangatira to be an accommodation ship in for workers building an oil platform at the Kishorn Yard in Loch Kishorn, Scotland. Rangatira was not an ideal accommodation ship, as her cabins were designed for overnight use rather than long-term residence. However, modifications for her new function were limited to alteration of her cafeteria. Then she left Falmouth on 12 March, reaching Loch Kishorn on 14 March.

Rangatira was in use in Loch Kishorn until May 1978. She visited Glasgow to be surveyed in October–November 1977 and again on 25 May 1978, when her charter to Sea Truck came to an end. On 18 March 1978 in Loch Kishorn the coastal tanker BP Springer collided with her, causing minor damage.

=== Sullom Voe ===
Rangatira was then repaired and altered for a four-year charter as an accommodation ship for the building of the Sullom Voe Terminal in the Shetland Islands. For this charter she was more thoroughly adapted. All her cabins were converted to single berths, a gymnasium and indoor games facilities for snooker and table tennis were installed and television lounges were built on her upper car deck. Rangatira reached Sullom Voe on 2 October.

On 9 May 1981, Queen Elizabeth II officially opened Sullom Voe terminal, and afterwards dined aboard Rangatira. The ship then returned to Falmouth to be laid up again, arriving on 5 July.

The Union Company again sought a client to charter Rangatira. Negotiations for her to be an accommodation ship for Pemex, Mexico's state-owned oil company, fell through. Then Blue Star Line entered negotiations for Rangatira to become a cruise ship off the coast of Africa, under the management of the Curnow Shipping Company which at the time ran RMS St Helena that served Saint Helena and Ascension Island. This would have involved replacing her steam turbines with diesel engines and a complete refit of her accommodation.

== Falkland Islands barracks ship ==
On 2 April 1982 Argentina invaded the Falkland Islands, and between 7 April and 12 May elements of a UK Task Force left Britain for a counter-invasion of the islands. Rangatira underwent sea trials for the UK Ministry of Defence, which on 15 May 1982 chartered her for possible service as a hospital ship. This was later changed to service as a barracks ship.

Rangatira went to HM Naval Base Devonport, England where she was modified for war service. This included fitting underway replenishment equipment for bunkering at sea, adding a helicopter deck to her A-deck strong enough for a Boeing CH-47 Chinook, and arming with four Oerlikon 20 mm cannon on her upper decks. Her accommodation was increased to about 1,200 people, with each two-berth cabin being increased to six berths. Her upper car deck was again remodelled, this time with three mess decks, a sergeants' mess and a lecture theatre. Her lower car deck was equipped with 14 freezer containers, holding enough food to feed 1,200 people for six months.

P&O arranged Rangatira's crew, appointing Blue Star Management to manage her. Her senior officers were drawn from the Union Company and the remainder were from Blue Star Line. A Naval Party was also embarked under the nomenclature NP2070, consisting of Radio Operators, airmen, gunners and engineers. She sailed from Southampton, England on 19 June and reached Port Stanley in the Falklands on 11 July, where she spent the next 14 months as a barracks.

On 26 September 1983 Rangatira left Port Stanley and on 18 October she arrived back at HMNB Devonport, where her Ministry of Defence equipment was removed. She then went to Harland & Wolff in Belfast, Northern Ireland who refitted her. On 29 March 1984 she left Belfast and on 30 March she arrived back in Falmouth, where she was laid up again.

== Mediterranean ferry ==
In 1986 Rangatira was sold to Searoyal Ferries, which was founded by Panayotis J Marangopoulos of Greece. She was overhauled and then on 3 November 1986 the platform supply vessel Vigen Supplier towed her out of Falmouth. Searoyal renamed her Queen M and registered her in Limassol under the Cypriot flag of convenience. She was operated by a Searoyal subsidiary, Marlines Ferries. However, after only a few months Marlines laid her up at Piraeus in Greece from 8 September 1987. On 9 March 1988 while still laid up she suffered slight damage when the cement carrier Victory V collided with her.

Queen M's route was across the Adriatic Sea between Ancona in Italy and Patras on the Peloponnese via Igoumenitsa in Epirus. She worked this route for the three years 1987–89, apparently only in the busy tourist months of each year. In 1988 Searoyal re-registered Queen M in Panama, another flag of convenience. In 1990 the company announced that it would extend her route to Turkey, but instead it sold her.

The ship was bought by the Rodriquez Group of Messina in Sicily. She was renamed Carlo R and registered in Valletta under the Maltese flag of convenience. Rodriquez Group's ferry-operating subsidiary Alimar chartered her to the Tunisian state-owned Compagnie Tunisienne de Navigation (CTN or COTUNAV) for the summers of 1990, 1991 and 1992, with whom she worked the Tunis – Genoa and Tunis – Marseille ferry routes. COTUNAV did not renew her charter for the 1993 season, so Alimar ran her between Tunis and Italy. In 1994 Alimar chartered Queen M to Horizon Sea Lines of Greece who ran her between Ancona and Çeşme on the Aegean coast of Turkey.

In 1995 Egnatia Line planned to charter Carlo R for a route across the Tyrrhenian Sea linking Trapani in Sicily with Livorno and Naples. However, Rodriquez Group was now in financial difficulties so Egnatia Line did not proceed with the charter. Instead from June 1995 she made a few Adriatic crossings between Bari and Patras or Igoumenitsa. On 16 August 1995 arrived in Naples for repairs, after which she remained there laid up.

By 2000 Rodriquez Group was bankrupt and a Neapolitan court had seized the ship for the company's debts. The court had her surveyed, and the marine surveyor valued her at about NZ$2.5 million. In August 2001 she was still laid up at Naples but in October she was sold by auction.

== Fate ==
The buyer was Oberon Cruise Line, which renamed her Alexander the Great and planned to have her converted into a cruise ship. She was towed to Bijela, Montenegro, where she arrived on 23 December 2001 to be converted at the Bijela Adriatic Shipyard. In January 2004 she was still in the shipyard, the planned conversion never materialised and by this time the ship was in very poor condition.

On 12 January 2005 the Greek tug Hellas towed her out of Bijela, arriving on 20 January at Aliağa in Turkey. She was to have been sold to an Indian ship breaking company to be broken up at Alang in Gujarat, but the deal fell through. Instead by 29 January she had been beached at Aliaga and was broken up.
