= List of classic vessels =

This is a list of classic vessels around the world. These are veteran vessels being maintained or restored with the aim of keeping them in operation. Many are in use for regular sailings, cruises or on a charter basis. They can be owned privately, by public bodies or by preservation groups. This list does not include museum ships, and the vessels listed are not necessarily on static display – for these, see list of museum ships.

Name	Built	Power	Function	Location	Notes
SF Ammonia	1929	screw steamer	railway ferry	Lake Tinn, Norway	the world's last remaining steam-powered railway ferry.
SS Badger	1952	screw steamer	passenger & auto ferry	Manitowoc, Wisconsin and Ludington, Michigan	Lake Michigan Carferry Service, regular sailings
Balatik	2014	sail	tourist excursion ship	Palawan, Philippines	Tao Philippines
MV Balmoral	1949	screw diesel	passenger ferry and excursion ship	Bristol, United Kingdom	PSPS/Waverley Excursions Ltd., regular sailings and charter excursions
Bernisse	1954	screw diesel	Minesweeper	Hellevoetsluis, Belgium	
USS Buncombe County (LST-510)	1943	screw diesel	LST	Orient Point, New York, United States	Ride an operational D-Day ship Cross Sound Ferry Services Inc, regular sailings.
Daniel Adamson	1903	screw steamer	canal tug	Cheshire	Daniel Adamson Preservation Society, regular sailings and charter cruises.
Hikitia	1926	steam twin-screw	floating steam crane	Wellington, New Zealand	Sister ship of scrapped museum ship Rapaki.
PS Kingswear Castle	1924	paddle steamer	excursion steamer	Kingswear, England	The Paddle Steamer Kingswear Castle Trust, regular sailings and charter cruises
MV Liemba	1913	screw diesel	cargo-passenger ferry	Lake Tanganyika	former German warship. Marine Services Company Limited, makes scheduled crossings once a week.
Lyttelton	1906	steam	steam tug	Lyttelton, New Zealand	Volunteers run excursions
PS Maid of the Loch	1953	paddle steamer	excursion steamer	Loch Lomond, Scotland	being restored, open to visitors, restaurant for functions.
RMS Segwun	1887	screw steamer	excursion steamer	Gravenhurst, Ontario	regular excursions, charter cruises.
SS Shieldhall	1954	screw steamer	cargo ship (sludge boat)	Southampton	The Solent Steam Packet Company Ltd., open daily, charter, occasional excursions.
SS Sir Walter Scott	1899	screw steamer	excursion steamer	Loch Katrine, Scotland	Scottish Water Co., regular sailings, charter cruises
MF Storegut	1956	screw diesel	railway ferry	Lake Tinn, Norway	
VIC 32	1943	screw steamer	Clyde Puffer	Scotland	regular excursions, charter cruises.
PS Waverley	1946	paddle steamer	excursion steamer	Glasgow	PSPS/Waverley Excursions Ltd., regular sailings

== See also ==
- Barcelona Charter
- List of former museum ships
