= Sir William Arrol & Co. =

Civil engineering company in Glasgow, Scotland

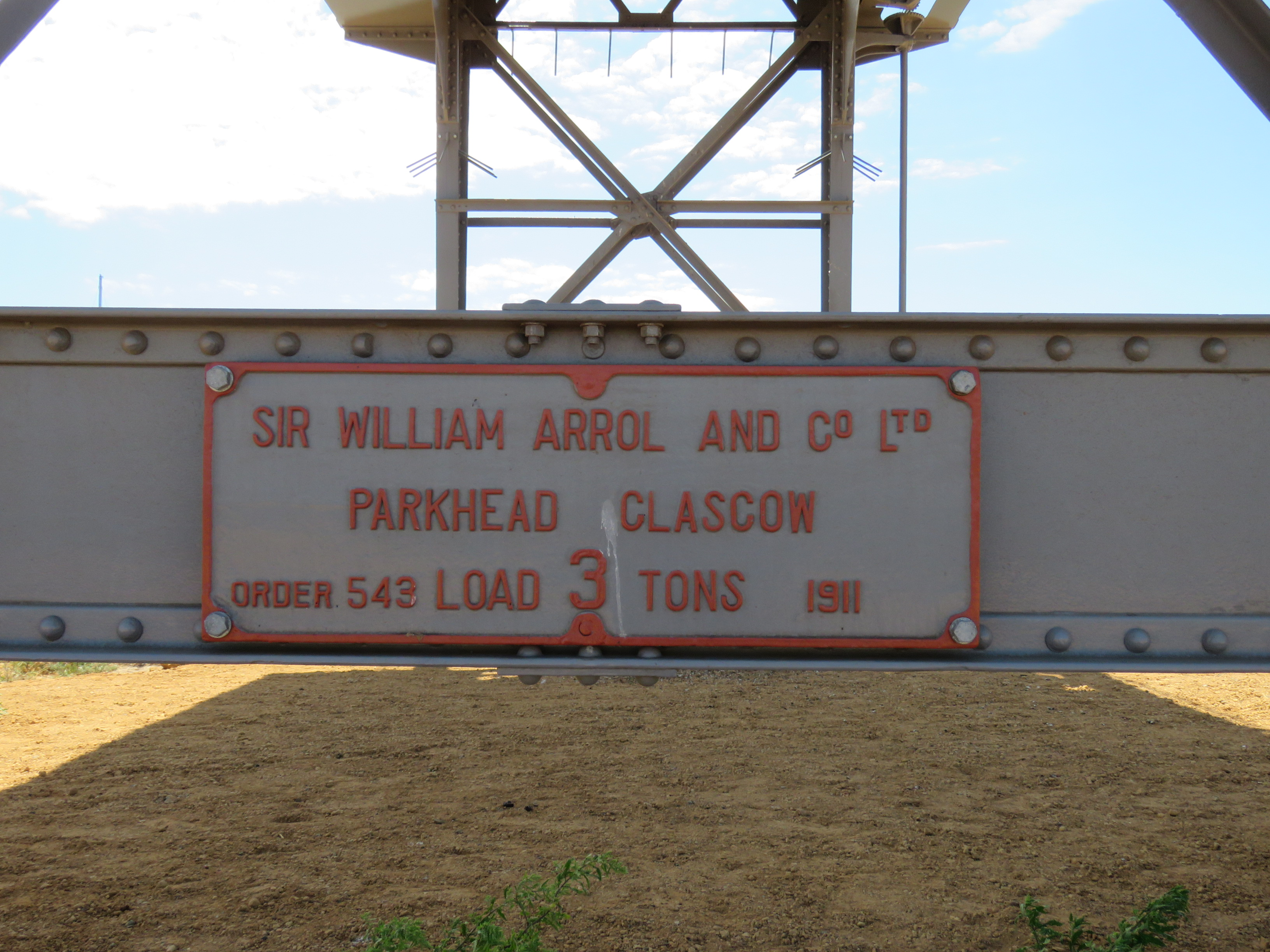
- Name plate on the 1911 Arrol & Co.-built Jetty Crane in Bunbury, Western Australia
- Company type: Public
- Industry: Civil engineering
- Founded: 1873
- Defunct: 1969
- Fate: Acquired
- Successor: Clarke Chapman
- Headquarters: Glasgow, Scotland
- Key people: Sir William Arrol (Chairman)

Sir William Arrol & Co. was a Scottish civil engineering and construction business founded by William Arrol and based in Glasgow. It built some of the most famous bridges in the United Kingdom including the second Tay Bridge, the Forth Bridge and Tower Bridge in London.

== Early history ==
The Company was founded by William Arrol, born in Houston, Renfrewshire in 1839, the fourth child of Thomas Arrol, a cotton spinner. He started work at the age of nine in a cotton mill, having passed himself off as thirteen. In 1850, the family moved to Paisley and William found work at Coats’s Cotton Thread Manufacturing making bobbins. At the age of fourteen he was apprenticed to a blacksmith at Paisley, supplementing his practical education with night school classes and the purchase of books on engineering.

At end of his apprenticeship William Arrol worked as a journeyman blacksmith with mixed success. Work was not easy to find and in 1858, now aged nineteen, he took a job at Ker’s factory at Paisley. Eventually he was engaged as a foreman at Laidlaw’s Engineering Works in Glasgow. Here he was entrusted with his first bridges: the Greenock and Ayrshire Railway at Greenock in 1865 and the West Pier at Brighton 1866. After two years, Arrol had saved enough money to set up with a friend as boiler and girder makers. However, they incurred heavy losses through non-payment by customers and the partnership was dissolved. On his own again with his small works in Glasgow, in 1871 he was given the construction of railway bridges on the Balerno line in Edinburgh.

In 1872, now in his early thirties, Arrol left his old works and moved to Dalmarnock in south Glasgow. His first important contract was for a bridge over the Clyde at Bothwell for the North British Railway. This bridge, which was 120 feet above the water, was notable for Arrol’s introduction of the idea of building the girders on land and rolling them out pier to pier. In 1875 he built the first of the two great bridges for the Caledonian Railway over the Clyde. Faced by a strike by the riveters he invented a hydraulic riveting machine, later to enjoy widespread use in the shipbuilding industry.

== The Great Bridges ==
December 1879 saw the great Tay Bridge disaster where the railway bridge collapsed under the lateral pressure of high winds, barely a year after it had opened. William Arrol was awarded the contract for the new bridge. Construction of the new Tay Bridge was started in 1882 and it opened in 1887. Almost simultaneously, William Arrol was also working on the Forth Bridge. Construction began in 1882 and when it was opened in 1890 it had the longest single cantilever bridge span in the world. William Arrol’s commitment to these two bridges was rewarded with a knighthood: Sir William Arrol & Company Ltd was incorporated in June 1893. The completion of the two Scottish bridges gave Sir William Arrol an international reputation and in the succeeding years bridges were built around Great Britain, Europe and as far as Australia. Perhaps the best known was London’s Tower Bridge opened in 1894, where Sir William Arrol erected all the steel work.

== Diversification ==
The development of Dalmarnock Works to cope with Arrol’s increased business involved the construction of new buildings with large spans and roofs of steel and glass which let in light throughout the building. Their size allowed the installation of large overhead cranes with up to 100 tons lifting capacity. This became an activity in its own right as similar buildings were constructed for other companies. Also arising out of Dalmarnock Works and bridgebuilding were cranes. particularly for shipbuilding; they had a loading capacity ranging from five to 150 tons. The most famous crane. the largest of its time, is the Titan Crane completed in 1907; a gigantic cantilever crane of 150-ton capacity. for John Brown & Company. With this increased range of activity, the Dalmarnock Works occupied 17 acres and employed 2000 men plus thousands more working on outside contracts. Sir William died in 1913 but the Company continued as an independent entity until 1969.

== Notable projects ==
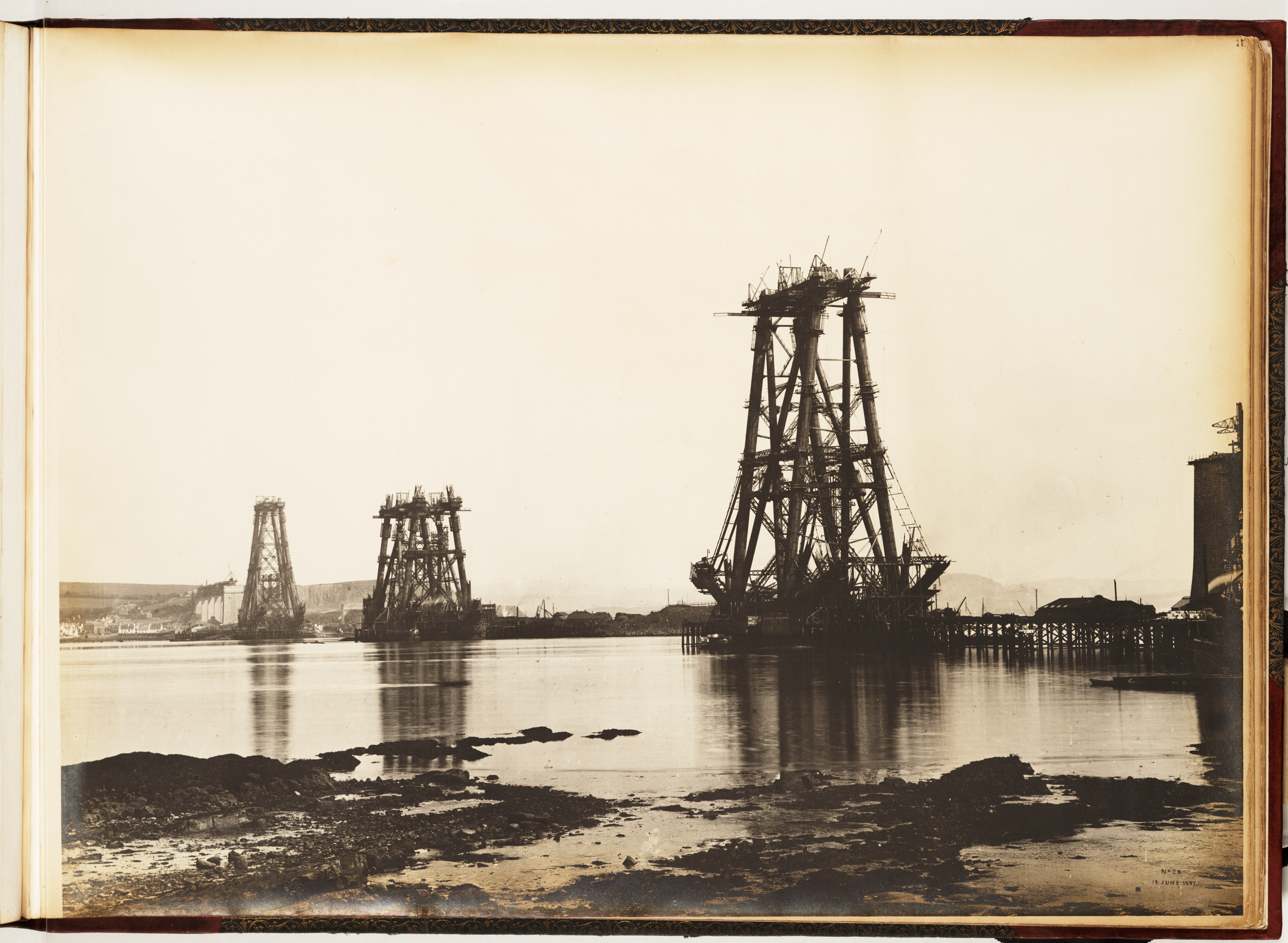
View of the cantilever construction of the Forth Bridge

The Forth Bridge built by Sir William Arrol & Co.

=== Bridges ===
Bridges built by the company include:

- Caledonian Railway Bridge across the River Clyde completed in 1878
- Tay Rail Bridge completed in 1887
- Forth Bridge completed in 1890
- Tower Bridge in London completed in 1894
- North Bridge in Edinburgh completed in 1897
- Redheugh Bridge in Newcastle upon Tyne completed in 1901
- Connel Bridge completed in 1903
- Abbas Bridge (now Giza Bridge) in Cairo completed in 1908
- Tees Transporter Bridge completed in 1911
- Warrington Transporter Bridge completed in 1916
- Keadby Bridge completed in 1916
- Southwark Bridge in London completed in 1921
- White Cart Bridge completed in 1923
- Jubilee Bridge (Walney) completed in 1908
- Jubilee Bridge (Queensferry) completed in 1927
- Corporation Bridge in Grimsby completed in 1928
- Wearmouth Bridge completed in 1929

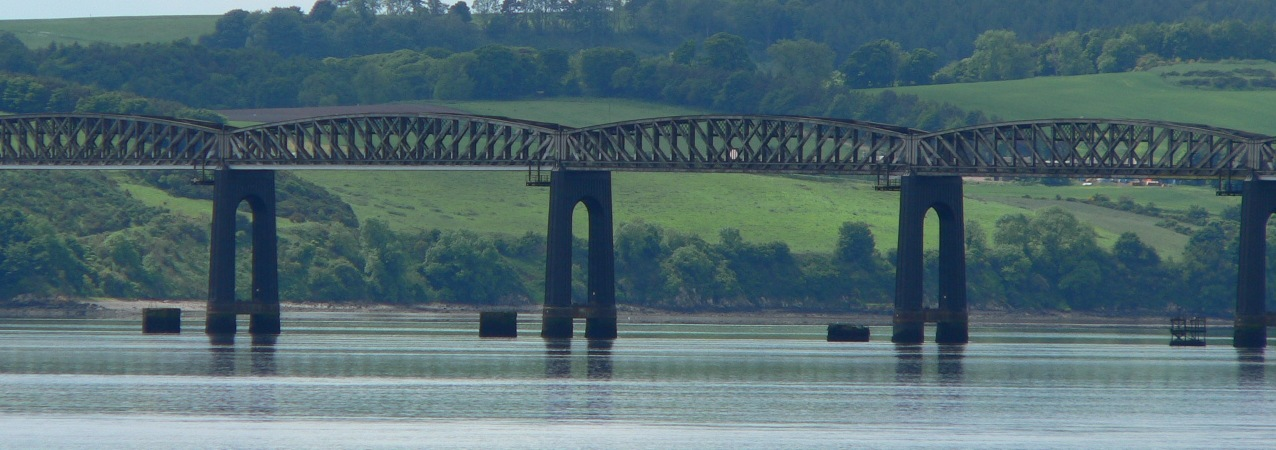
A closeup of the central section of the second Tay Bridge

- Tsoelike Suspension Bridge in Lesotho completed in 1930
- Forth Road Bridge completed in 1964
- Deptford Railroad Bridge completed in 1964
- Severn Bridge completed in 1966
- Lifting span of Maurice O'Neill bridge Valentia Island Co. Kerry completed in 1970
- The second Craigellachie Bridge completed in 1970
- The Humber Bridge completed in 1981

=== Cranes ===
- Titan Clydebank, completed in 1907
- Titan Crane, Fairfield, completed in 1911
- 250-ton crane, HMNB Portsmouth, dated 1912, demolished 1984
- Titan Crane, James Watt Dock Crane, completed in 1917
- Titan Crane, Barclay Curle, completed in 1920
- Blocksetter Travelling Titan (South African Harbours and Railways); for use at Durban, completed prior to 1932
- Blocksetter Travelling Hercules (South African Harbours and Railways); for use at Table Bay, completed prior to 1932
- Blocksetter Travelling Hercules; for use at Ceuta, completed prior to 1932
- Gantry crane, Turbine Hall, Bankside Power Station, dated 1940s. Still visible in static display within the Tate Modern.
- Gantry crane, Turbine Hall, Battersea Power Station Still visible in static display within the refurbished building.

=== Titanic ===
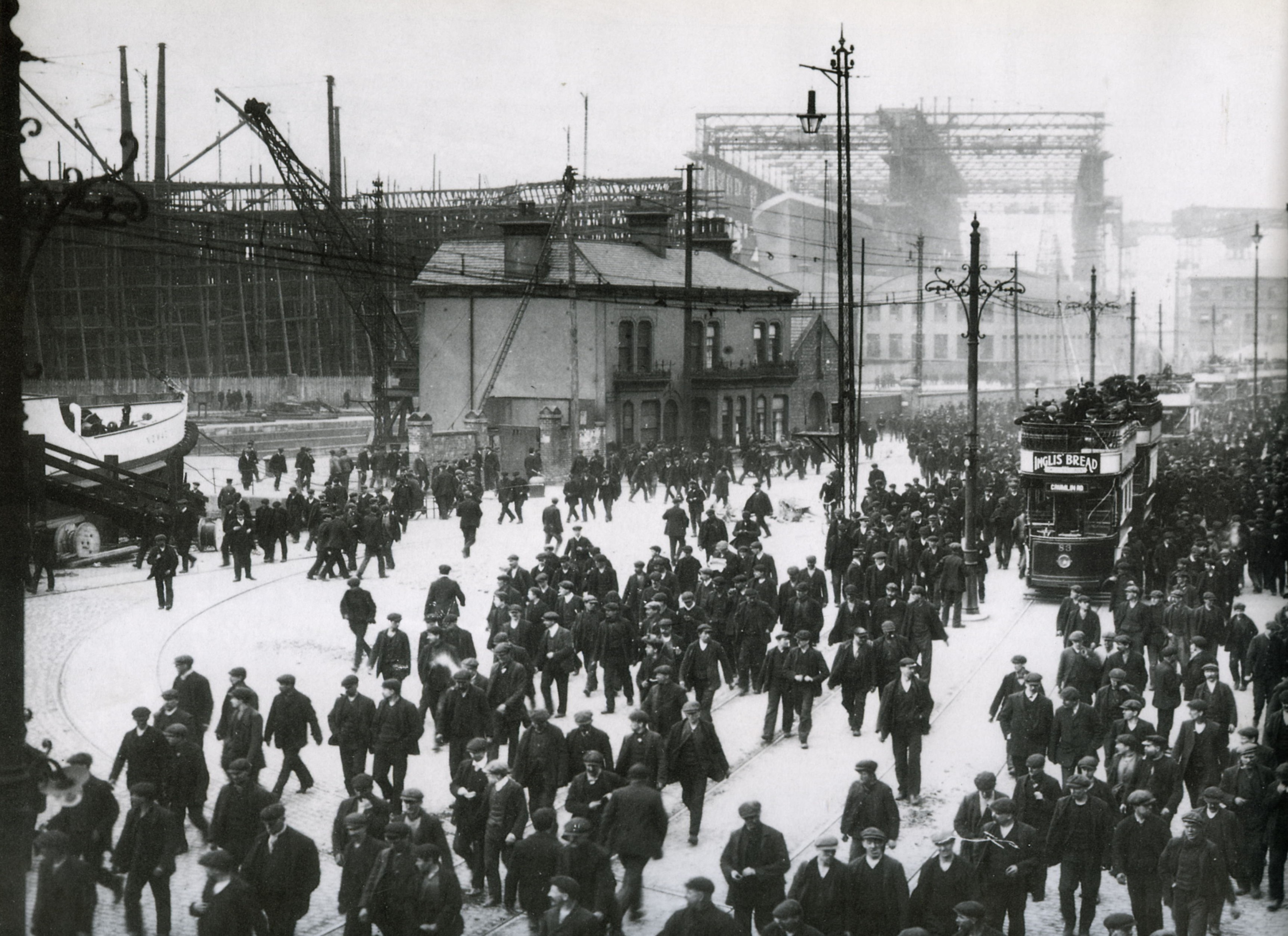
Workers leaving the Harland & Wolff shipyard in early 1911. The RMS Titanic can be seen in the background, underneath the Arrol Gantry.

The company was contracted by Harland and Wolff Shipyard, Belfast, to construct a large gantry (known as the Arrol Gantry) for the construction of the three planned Olympic-class ocean liners. Like the ships themselves, the gantry crane was one of the largest built at the time, comparing with transporter bridges in length, height and capability.

=== Hikitia ===
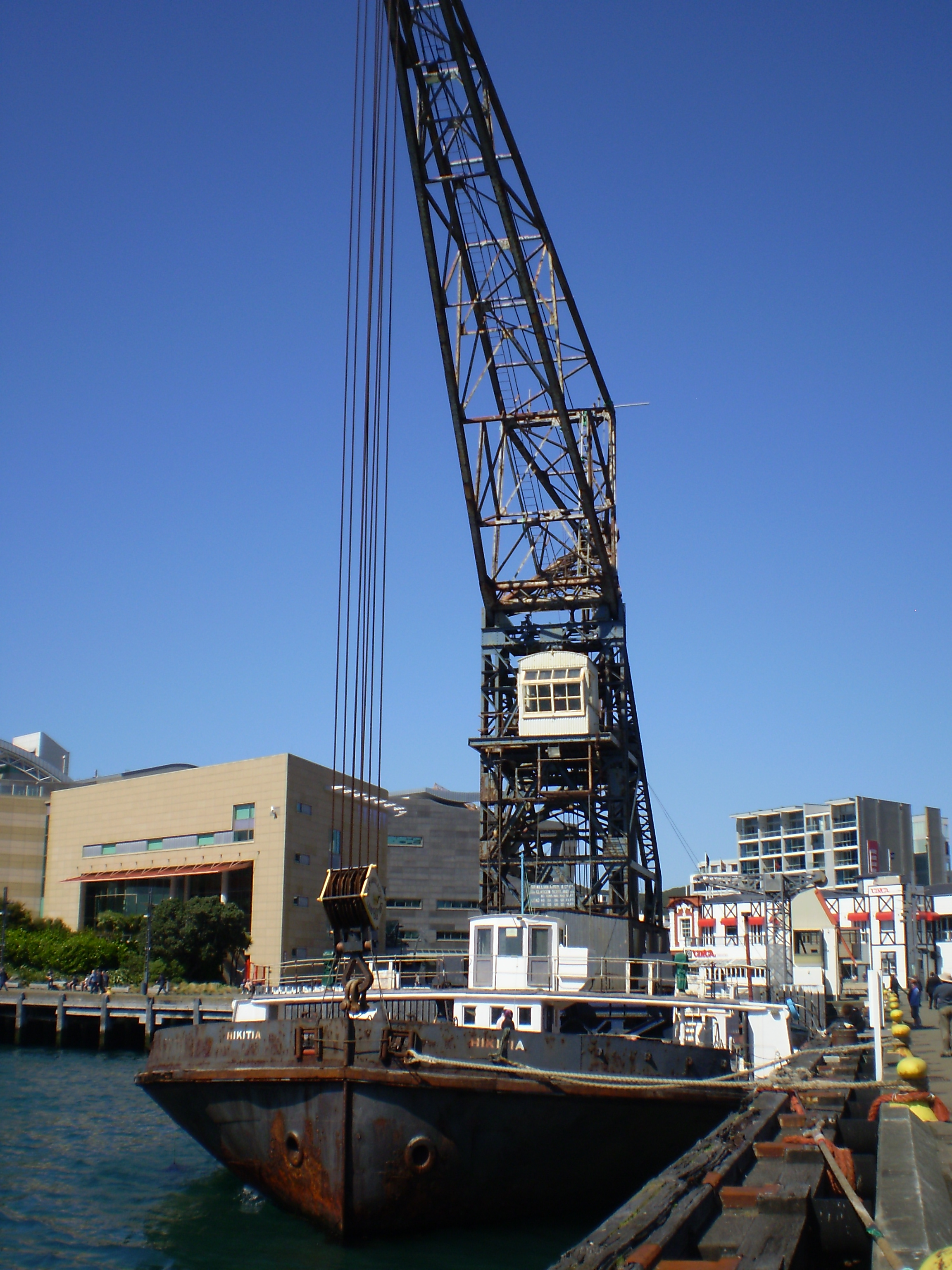
Hikitia at the Taranaki St wharf in Wellington

The company also built the crane for the Hikitia in 1926, which is thought to be the last fully operational self-propelled steam crane in the world.

== Demise of the business ==
The company was acquired by Clarke Chapman in 1969 and the Dalmarnock Works were closed in 1986.
