= Te Heke-rangatira-ki-Nukutaurua Boyd =

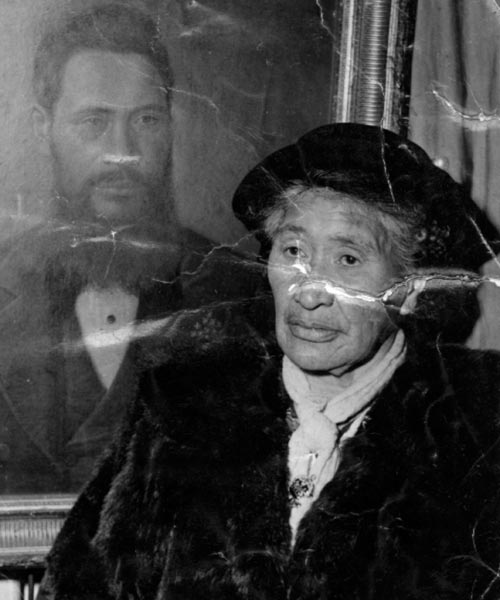
- Te Heke-rangatira-ki-Nukutaurua Boyd in front of a painting of her grandfather, Hoani Te Rangitakaiwaho, by Gottfried Lindauer
- Born: c. 1886
- Died: 29 May 1959

Te Heke-rangatira-ki-Nukutaurua Boyd (c. 1886 – 29 May 1959) was a New Zealand tribal leader and interpreter. Of Māori descent, she identified with the Ngāti Moe iwi.

== Biography ==
She was born in Greytown, Wairarapa in c.1886.
