= Rapaki (steam crane) =

Historic ship in New Zealand

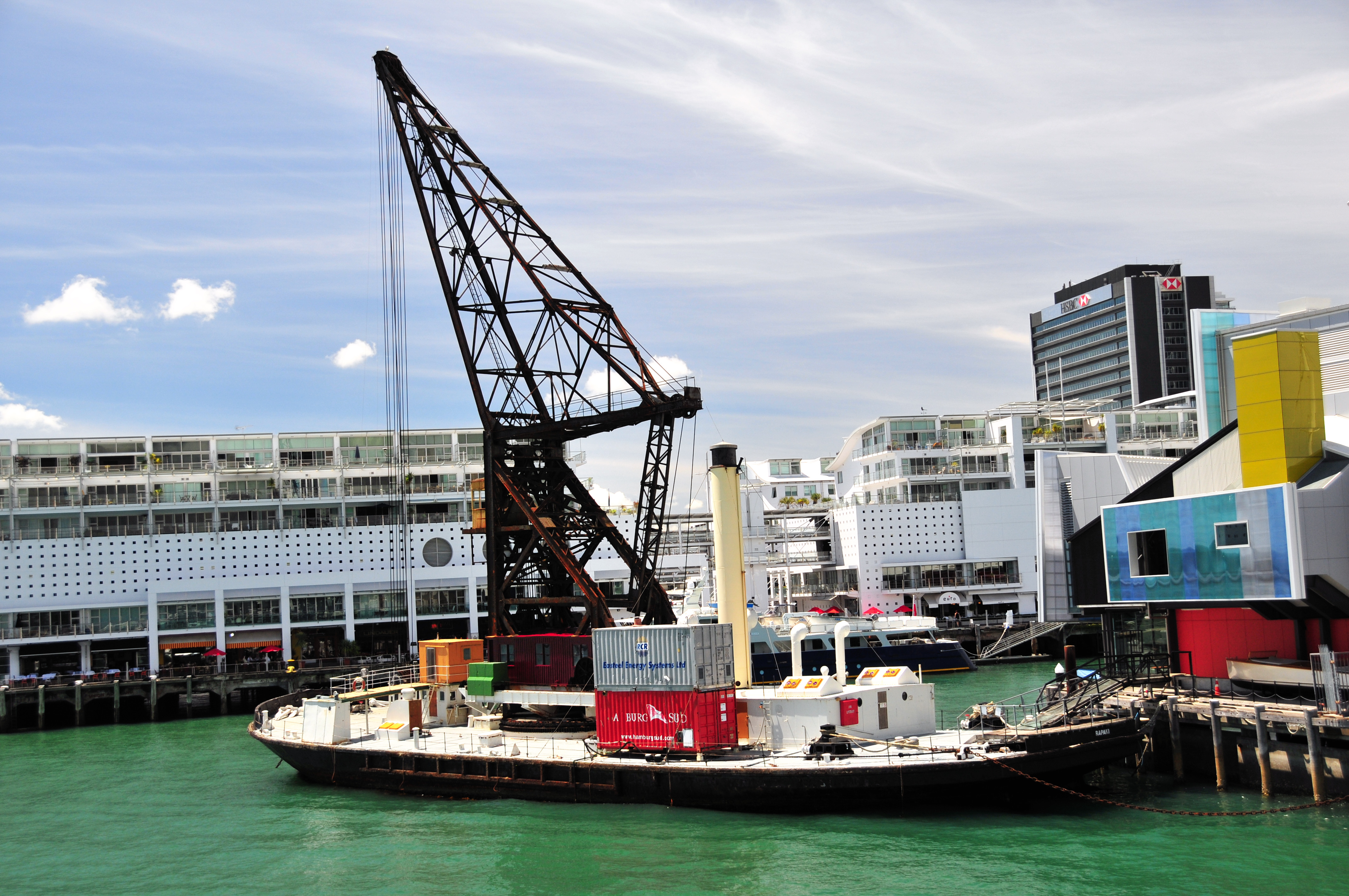
- Rapaki in Auckland Harbour

History

New Zealand
- Name: Rapaki
- Owner: Lyttleton Harbour Board
- Port of registry: Auckland
- Builder: Fleming & Ferguson, Paisley, Scotland
- Yard number: 485
- Launched: 19 November 1925
- Identification: IMO number: 5290325; Callsign: ZMGK
- Fate: Towed for scrapping in December 2018

General characteristics
- Type: Steam crane
- Tonnage: 762 GRT
- Length: 160.4 ft (48.9 m)
- Beam: 52.3 ft (15.9 m)
- Installed power: Steam engines
- Propulsion: Twin screw

The steam crane Rapaki was a historic ship in New Zealand.

== Service history ==
On 24 December 1925 the Lyttelton Harbour Board ordered an 80-ton self-propelled floating crane, called Rapaki. She was named after the settlement close to Lyttelton of the same name. She was built at a cost of £42,000. Her two compound engines were built by Fleming & Ferguson in Paisley, Scotland, and her crane by Sir William Arrol & Co in Glasgow. The crane was fitted to the hull at John Brown's yard at Clydebank. Rapaki was one of two steam cranes in New Zealand waters, the other being the Hikitia which as of 2024 can still be visited on the Wellington Waterfront. Rapaki operated in Lyttelton for 60 years.

The Rapaki took 109 days to sail from Greenock, Scotland, to Lyttelton, leaving on 9 April 1926 and arriving on 28 July 1926. She was fitted with voyage keels by D. & W. Henderson at Meadowside and temporary accommodations in preparation for her journey to New Zealand. Her jib was dismounted and bolted to the deck, and crane secured. The crew encountered stormy weather going into the Atlantic and was driven into the English Channel. After being pushed 400 miles off course, Rapaki faced a coal shortage and ended up in Barbados. She also travelled across the Pacific, docking in Papeete, Tahiti before finally heading to Lyttelton. After more bad weather in mid-July, Captain H. L. Mack made the decision to travel towards Gisborne instead of Auckland. They were rapidly running out of fuel and drifted to conserve their stores. On July 16, they anchored in Waipiro Bay and went ashore to purchase coal. They reached Gisborne after consuming another 95 tonnes of coal.

Lyttelton was anxious since they had no news of Rapaki's delay and was expecting her much earlier. Contingencies were discussed and two naval sloops from Auckland and two salvage tugs from Lyttelton were planning to go and find Rapaki. Eventually she was spotted off Adderly Head and the tug Lyttelton went out to tug her into the harbour. In September 1926 she was brough to Lyttelton Graving Dock for her crane jib to be put up. By October 14, 1926, she was put to work in the Lyttelton Harbour.

During World War II Rapaki was requisitioned for war work in the Pacific. It had been intended that she go to the Middle East, but after Japan joined the war this plan was cancelled. In July 1941 the British Ministry of War Transport requested Rapaki for overseas service, initially planned to go to Massawea, the Red Sea Port of Eritrea to help raise and strip sunken ships. She left Lyttelton on December 20, 1941, but a storm in Cook Strait resulted in her being tugged to Auckland. In December 1942, the New Zealand War Cabinet let Rapaki go to Nouméa, New Caledonia on a monthly rental following a shortage of cargo-handling facilities. She worked there for three years, manned by eighteen New Zealanders and six U.S. Army crane drivers. She left Nouméa on October 29, 1945, for Auckland and Lyttelton, towed by a US army tug.

New technology made Rapaki redundant. Rapaki retired from service in 1988. At the end of her working life, Rapaki was transported to Auckland, and acquired by the New Zealand Maritime Museum Hui Te Ananui a Tangaroa in 1993 to become an exhibit on Auckland's waterfront. It was brought to Auckland by Navy tug Arataki. She protected the rest of the Maritime Museum's fleet by acting as a breakwater.

In December 2018, the Rapaki was towed to Wynyard Wharf to be broken up. Some of its parts were given to the Hikitia. This was mostly because of high maintenance costs, which was around $10 million and would require frequent care. Her decommissioning also coincided with the 2018 America's Cup construction, and a breakwater was built where Rapaki previously resided. The Maritime Museum worked with the Heritage Trust of Wellington, the Steam Engine Society, and Toroa Preservation Society to identify and keep items of interest. The boiler was given to Toroa Preservation Society, the crane engines to the Auckland Steam Engine Society, and her rudder and other parts to sister ship Hikitia and the Maritime Heritage Trust in Wellington. The Maritime Museum kept the maker's plate, and some engine room auxiliaries including the condenser, pumps and dynamo, propellers, and casting patterns used for making replacement parts. Before being scrapped a photometric scan was made so one day a 3D rendition of Rapaki may be created.

== Specifications ==
Rapaki's crane had a 50-foot radius and could handle up to 80 tonnes. The top of her jib reached 124 feet above water. For operation of the crane, an engineer had to hoist and ballast racking engines from 32 feet above deck, with another engineer operating from the machinery house on deck.

She had a pair of Fleming and Ferguson vertical reciprocating steam engines which were connected to twin screws and a steel return tube boiler. In January 1979, Lyttelton Harbour Board replaced her boiler with a new one from Andersons Ltd. in Christchurch.

== See also ==
- List of classic vessels
- List of museum ships
