= TEV Rangatira (1931) =

Passenger ferry

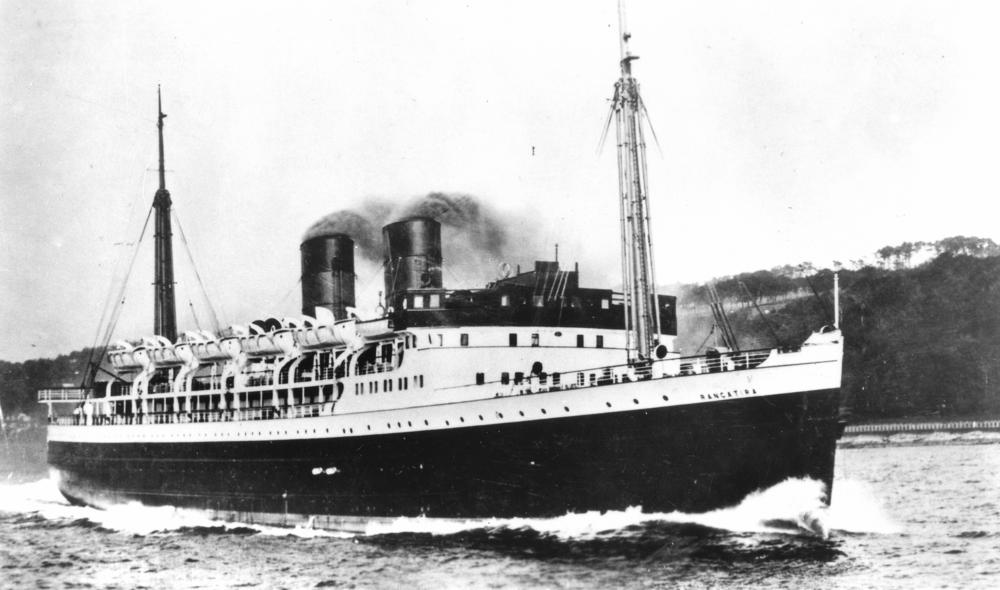
- Rangatira sailing at full speed.

History
- Name: Rangatira
- Owner: Union Company
- Ordered: 1930
- Builder: Vickers-Armstrongs, Barrow-in-Furness
- Cost: £500,000 (1930)
- Launched: 16 April 1931
- In service: 1931–1965
- Fate: Scrapped 1968

General characteristics
- Type: Passenger ferry
- Tonnage: 6,152 GRT; 2,531 NRT
- Length: 419 ft (127.71 m)
- Beam: 58 ft (17.68 m)
- Draught: 29 ft (8.84 m); 17 ft (5.18 m) (loaded)
- Installed power: 13,800 hp (10,300 kW)
- Propulsion: 6 boilers, turbo-electric, twin screw
- Speed: in excess of 22 knots (41 km/h; 25 mph)
- Capacity: 720 first class, 236 second class; later 794; up to 2,300 for day cruises
- Crew: 112

TEV Rangatira was a passenger ferry that sailed the Wellington to Lyttelton route between 1931 and 1963. She was the first turbo-electric vessel (TEV) to arrive in Australia or New Zealand waters. During the Christmas season she would also run trips between Wellington and Picton.

== Design ==
Ordered in 1930, TEV Rangatira was designed with accommodation for up to 720 first class and 236 second class passengers. Her power plant consisted of six water-tube boilers generating energy for two synchronous electric motors making 13,800 shaft horsepower (10,300 kW); these directly powering twin screws. She had a length of 419 feet (128 m) and a width of 58 feet (18 m). Each cabin was provided with a hand basin containing hot and cold running water, and every berth had a reading lamp. For increased maneuverability, the ship was designed with a bow rudder to complement her main rudder.

== Service history ==
Launched in England on 16 April 1931, Rangatira arrived in Port Chalmers on 16 October 1931.

On Boxing Day, 26 December 1934 she set a personal record, carrying 2,300 passengers (the maximum possible under her license) from Wellington to Picton.

On 5 September 1933 while maneuvering into berth in Picton, Rangatira collided with the crane boat Rapaki, pushing Rapaki into the pilot launch Ruahine, crushing the launch against the pier piles. Rapaki received only £200 of damage, while Ruahine purportedly received £500 of damage. Rangatira suffered some damage of her stern plates but the damage was light enough for her to travel to Wellington for repairs.

On 14 April 1938, while attempting to depart from Wellington in 70 mph (110 km/h) winds and carrying around 1,000 passengers, Rangatira's anchor fouled with the docked cruiser HMS Achilles. The cruiser was ripped from her moorings, dragging anchor and damaging her propellers on the concrete pier piles, before coming to rest on a soft mud bank before being freed four hours later by two harbor tugs. After getting free, Rangatira continued on her voyage. During the incident, the bow of HMS Achilles collided with Rangatira, resulting in minor damage.

She served as a troop ship during World War II.

On 29 December 1940 while sailing in thick fog near Lyttelton around 5:30 am, Rangatira ran aground. She was located by the tug Lyttelton and the Union Company vessel Waimarino on a reef on the western head of Pigeon Bay, Banks Peninsula, 20 miles (32 km) from Lyttelton. Following the arrival of the ships, all 750 passengers from Rangatira were offloaded onto Waimarino via both vessel's lifeboats, with Waimarino transporting the passengers the final stretch to Lyttelton. It was noted the only injury was a woman tearing a fingernail. After ten hours aground, Rangatira, with the assistance of Lyttelton and the newly arrived Karitane, a fellow Union Company vessel, freed herself from the reef during high tide. She arrived at Lyttelton at 3.40 pm, before sailing onwards to Port Chalmers for repairs. She returned to service three months later.

At 2:00 am on Christmas Day 25 December 1959 Rangatira went aground on the Wheke Rocks inside the entrance to the Tory Channel. She was freed undamaged at 4:25 am on Boxing Day 26 December by the Union Company tugs Tapuhi and Taioma.

== Fate ==
She was retired on 16 December 1965 after 37 years of service, being laid up in Wellington while sale was negotiated. Over her lifetime, she transported a total of over 4 million passengers. She was scrapped in 1967.
