= Hikitia =

Crane ship in Wellington, New Zealand

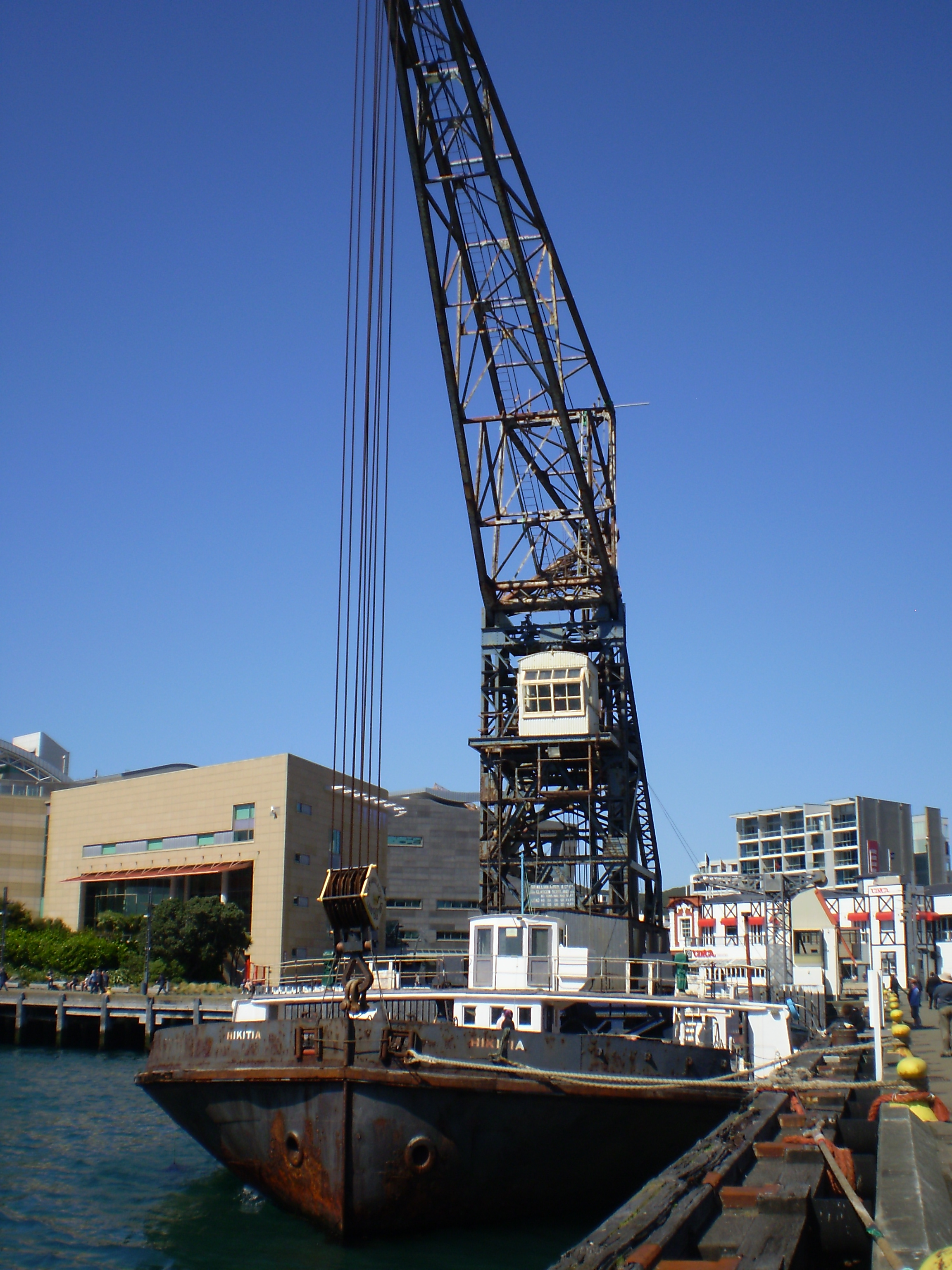
- Hikitia at the Taranaki Street wharf

History

New Zealand
- Name: Hikitia
- Owner: Maritime Heritage Trust of Wellington
- Port of registry: Wellington
- Builder: Fleming & Ferguson, Paisley, Scotland
- Yard number: 486
- Launched: 15 April 1926
- Maiden voyage: 29 September 1926
- Identification: IMO number: 5150393
- Status: Operational

General characteristics
- Tonnage: 746 GRT
- Displacement: 926 tonnes
- Length: 160.1 ft (48.8 m)
- Beam: 52.3 ft (15.9 m)
- Draught: 7 ft (2.1 m)
- Installed power: steam engines originally fed by coal-fired Scotch boilers, later replaced in 1963 by oil-fired boilers and then by small modern package boilers.
- Propulsion: twin screw
- Speed: about 9 kn (16.7 km/h)

Hikitia (Māori: = "to lift") is a self-propelled floating steam crane in Wellington Harbour, New Zealand. She is thought to be the only working steam crane of her type in the world.

She is also the sister ship to the Rapaki, formerly of the Port of Lyttelton, which was put on display at the New Zealand Maritime Museum after being taken out of service, and then scrapped in January 2019. Some parts from Rapaki were given to Hikitia.

== History ==
Wellington Harbour Board commissioned construction of the Hikitia in 1925. The hull of the vessel was built by Fleming & Ferguson of Paisley, Scotland, and the crane was built by Sir William Arrol & Co. of Glasgow. Below the deck, the vessel had a room used as crew quarters and messroom, officers' quarters with two small cabins for the captain and first officer, an engine room, boiler room with compartments for coal, and a hold used for storage of cables and other equipment.

After completing trials, the vessel left Greenock on 29 September 1926 with a crew of 15. The delivery voyage took 82 days, travelling via the Panama Canal and Tahiti to reach New Zealand. The vessel travelled with the crane fully erected, and arrived in Wellington Harbour on 21 December 1926. Contemporary accounts called the voyage "unique", and it is generally considered that Hikitia's maiden voyage represents a record distance sailed by a vessel of this type with its jib up. Hikitia's sister ship Rapaki had sailed the same route from Scotland to New Zealand four months earlier, but had travelled with her jib lowered and lashed to the deck.

During its long service in Wellington, Hikitia undertook many tasks including lifting heavy items on and off ships, transporting and helping to install a concrete lighthouse at Point Jerningham, and salvaging ships including the Wahine, a passenger ferry which ran aground in 1968. During World War 2, Hikitia was very busy moving heavy equipment and vehicles including tanks for Allied Forces based in Wellington. Hikitia was used during installation of the Carter Fountain at Oriental Bay in 1973.

Wellington Harbour Board was disestablished in 1989 and Hikitia was put up for sale. The New Zealand Underwater Association wanted to sink Hikitia to create an artificial reef and use her as a training ground for those interested in diving on wrecks, but others wanted to preserve the vessel as a piece of history. In 1990 Hikitia was bought by two couples who formed a company they named Hikitia Heavy Lift. With the help of volunteers, they refurbished Hikitia and she continued to work as a crane, including lifting over 80 large yachts in three separate fleets of BT Challenge yachts.

In March 2006, ownership of Hikitia was transferred to the Maritime Heritage Trust, which as of 2026 still manages and maintains the vessel.

Hikitia travelled to Lyttelton in June 2009 for hull, tail shaft and various other underwater repairs. While in Lyttelton, she moved an ice plant between wharves to repay part of her refurbishment at the port's dry dock. The venture south was the ship's first time out of Wellington since 1926.

== Engines ==
Twin screws are driven by surface-condensing direct-drive compound engines which were supplied with steam by a coal-fired Scotch boiler with two furnaces. A similar but oil-fired boiler replaced the original boiler in 1963. In 1980 this was also removed and the present two locally-made small modern package boilers were installed. These new boilers produce less steam than the original ones.

== Crane ==
The crane alone weighs 310 tonnes, and was built to lift 80 tonnes. However, while dismantling the wreck of TEV Wahine it is thought that she lifted 140 tonnes. In 2004, she lifted 100 tonnes to maintain her lifting licence of 80 tonnes. In 2009, Hikitia lifted a 22 tonne ice plant in Lyttelton.

== Project 27 ==
In 2026, the centenary of Hikitia's construction, the Maritime Heritage Trust announced 'Project 27', a $3.4 million plan to restore the crane. The Hikitia is protected because of its age, and cannot be cheaply scrapped. Rather than decommissioning the crane and losing some of Wellington's maritime history, the trust hopes that Hikitia can become a key attraction for Wellington. Nigel Fyfe, a Hikitia volunteer, notes that a similar ship in Trieste, Italy "is cherished as a city mascot".

The plan entails towing the crane to Lyttleton so that major repair work on the hull can be done in a dry dock. It is expected that it will take 36 hours to tow the Hikitia to Lyttleton. A deposit for a berth in Lyttleton in June 2027 has been waived. After the hull is refurbished, repairs to the crane will be made, and internal reconfiguration of the vessel will be undertaken to create a walkway through the ship so that visitors can see the captain’s quarters and crew quarters and look over the boiler room and engine room. Smith’s, a crane business in Christchurch, has offered to repair and reinstall the jib for nothing. The trust aims to have the crane fully working for visitors, who will be able to board the vessel to see it in action. A small visitor centre may be built on the wharf for ticket sales and souvenirs.

== Incidents ==
There have been two deaths resulting from people climbing the crane and jumping into Wellington Harbour: one in 2015, and another in 2024. The owners of the Hikitia said they had reviewed safety along with the Wellington City Council after the 2015 fatality. Video cameras and warning signs had been placed on the vessel.

Features of the Hikitia

Superstructure

Crane jib

Crane hook

The crane rotates on a large ring.

Counterweights can be moved along a rail to balance the vessel during lifts

Boiler room

The hold

== See also ==
- List of classic vessels
- List of museum ships
